= Aleppo offensive =

Aleppo offensive may refer to:

- Operation Northern Storm, a government offensive in early June 2013
- West Aleppo Offensive, a rebel offensive in late June 2013
- Aleppo offensive (October–December 2013), a government offensive in 2013
- Aleppo offensive (July 2015)
- Aleppo offensive (October–December 2015)
- Aleppo offensive (June–July 2016)
- Aleppo offensive (July–August 2016)
- Aleppo offensive (August–September 2016)
- Aleppo offensive (September–October 2016)
- Aleppo offensive (October–November 2016)
- Aleppo offensive (November–December 2016)
- Northwestern Aleppo Offensive (2024)
