= Aleppo offensive (September–October 2016) =

Military operation

- Part of the Battle of Aleppo and the Syrian Civil War
- Map of frontline changes from 22 September to 15 October 2016. Syrian Armed Forces Syrian Democratic Forces Rebel forces Front line before the offensive
Date	22 September 2016 – 16 October 2016 (3 weeks and 3 days)
Location	Aleppo, Syria
Result	Syrian Army and allies advances; Rebel counter-offensive
Territorial changes	Pro-government forces capture 15–20% of the rebel-held part of Aleppo

Belligerents
(Syria) Syrian Arab Republic; Ba'ath Brigades; Russia; Iran; Hezbollah; Harakat Hezbollah al-Nujaba; Asa'ib Ahl al-Haq	Fatah Halab; Jabhat Fateh al-Sham (Al-Nusra Front)

Commanders and leaders
Maj. Gen. Zaid Saleh (Head of Aleppo security committee); Maj. Gen. Adib Salameh (Head of Aleppo Air Force Intelligence Directorate branch, replaced); Gen. Iyad Mindo (Head of Aleppo Air Force Intelligence Directorate branch, replacement); Maj. Gen. Qasem Soleimani (Quds Force chief commander); Col. Mohammad-Reza Zarealvani † (Saberin Unit commander); Hatem Hamadeh † (Radwan Forces deputy commander); Mahmoud Ahmed Muzannar † (Hezbollah senior commander, alleged); Akram al-Kaabi (leader of Harakat Hezbollah al-Nujaba); Mohammad-Bagher Soleimani † (Asa'ib Ahl al-Haq commander)	Omar al-Sheikh † (Harakat Nour al-Din al-Zenki commander); Zakaria Malhifji (Fastaqim Kama Umirt official); 1st Lt. Adham Al-Awad † (Levant Front top commander); Mohammad Idlibi † (Levant Front top commander)

Units involved
Syrian Arab Armed Forces; Syrian Arab Army; 1st Armoured Division; 4th Mechanized Division; Republican Guard; 102nd Brigade; 106th Brigade; 800th Regiment; Tiger Forces; Liwa al-Quds; National Defense Forces; Military Intelligence Directorate; Air Force Intelligence Directorate; Syrian Arab Air Force; Russian Armed Forces; Russian Air Force; Naval Infantry advisors; IRGC; Saberin Unit; Quds Force; Basij; Hezbollah units; Radwan Forces	Fatah Halab; Ahrar al-Sham; Nour al-Din al-Zenki Movement; Free Syrian Army; Fastaqim Kama Umirt; Jaysh al-Nasr; Army of Mujahideen; Levant Revolutionaries Battalions; 101st Infantry Division; Central Division; Al-Fauj al-Awwal; Free Idlib Army; Mountain Hawks Brigade; 13th Division; Northern Division; Sham Legion; Authenticity and Development Front; Levant Front

Strength
10,000+ pro-government fighters: 3,250 soldiers; 5,000 al-Nujaba fighters; (Russia) 120+ Naval Infantry advisors	c. 8,000 fighters

Casualties and losses
98–141+ killed	56–96+ killed
- 573 civilians killed (per the SOHR; since 19 Sep.); 497 civilians killed (per the UN)

The Aleppo offensive of September–October 2016 was the military operation launched in Aleppo in late September 2016 by the Syrian Army and its allies aiming to capture all of the remaining rebel-held parts of the city of Aleppo. Rebel forces controlling East Aleppo at that time were primarily fighters of Fatah Halab (which includes FSA units), although a significant number of Jabhat Fateh al-Sham and Ahrar al-Sham fighters were also present.

== Offensive ==
=== Airstrikes and initial fighting ===
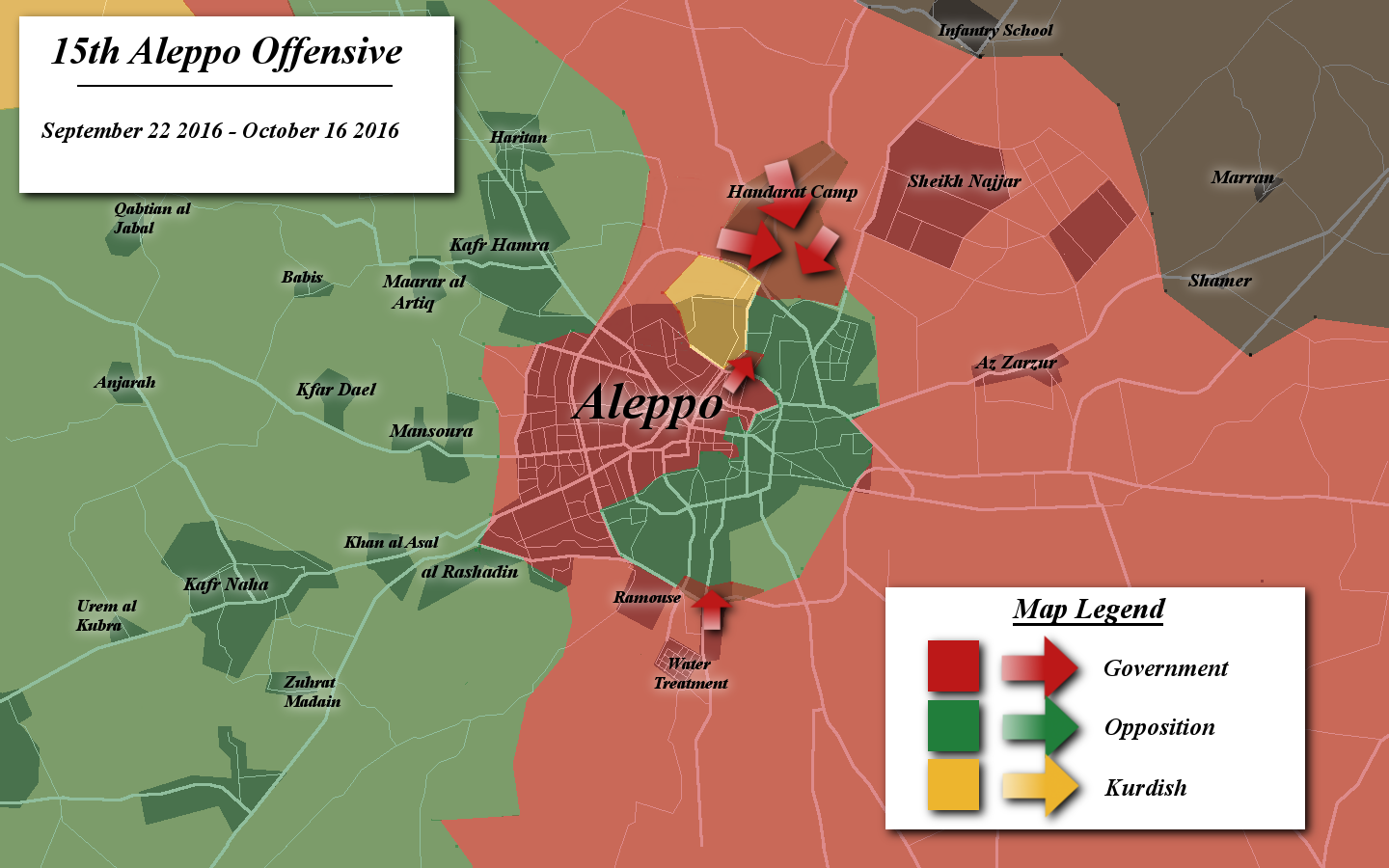
Map of the offensive

Early on 22 September 2016, the Syrian and Russian Air Forces started preparatory air-strikes for the upcoming offensive. Over 40 air-strikes were conducted against five districts throughout the day. Mobilization of ground units had also started and by the evening of that day, the ground assault against the rebel-held eastern part of Aleppo city was about to begin. At this time, the military officially announced the start of the offensive.

The strikes continued for a second day into 23 September, and the explosions were described as "the fiercest the city had faced". Buildings were demolished, a main water station was damaged and neighborhoods were engulfed in flames. Since the start of the bombing campaign, 50 Russian air-strikes had been conducted on the city and 30 in the surrounding areas, in addition to dozens carried out by the Syrian Air Force. During the day, the first Army ground advances took place in the southern outskirts of Aleppo, as the military secured the Ramousah-'Amiriyah highway and its intersection after gains around the Al-Badawi mosque. The government advances forced civilians from the area to migrate to other parts of eastern Aleppo. Later, pro-government Palestinian militias also captured parts of the Handarat Camp area of northeastern Aleppo, namely the Shaher district. The Handarat Camp had been previously a Palestinian refugee camp. By the end of the day, the Syrian Air Force had conducted more than 150 air-strikes against 30 neighbourhoods in Aleppo. Army artillery bombardment was also conducted.

Early on 24 September, military preparations were being made for the Syrian Army to assault the southern Sheikh Sa'id district. The attack started that morning, and within hours government troops had taken control of several building blocks. Concurrently, pro-government militias continued to advance in the Handarat Camp area, seizing the eastern entrance to the Camp and leaving only half of it still rebel-held. Shortly after, the Palestinian militias captured the whole Handarat Camp. In addition, government troops made advances on a third axis, taking control of two dozen building blocks near the historic Aleppo citadel in the city center. Meanwhile, a new wave of air-strikes were conducted throughout Aleppo, and a military official stated the strikes had been targeting an array of rebel fortifications, including tunnels, bunkers and command centers. Following the capture of the Handarat Camp district, the Army shifted its focus to the nearby Kindi Cancer Hospital, which had been converted into a military base by the rebels. Intense clashes took place at the hospital, as the Army also imposed fire control over the nearby Shuqeif Industrial Area. Later that evening, an initial rebel counter-attack against the Handarat Camp was repelled. However, pro-government militias withdrew from the district, while still maintaining control of the nearby Shaher sector and the Handarat Industrial District, east of the refugee camp.

On 25 September, after securing the Shaher district, the Palestinian militias launched a new assault on the Handarat Camp. The camp was heavily hit by air-strikes. The bombing burned many rebel vehicles. Fighting also continued in the southern Sheikh Sa'id district,

=== Syrian Army advances in northern and central Aleppo ===
On 27 September, the Army advanced in the Farafira district of Old Aleppo and captured it. At the same time, the two largest hospitals in the rebel-held part of the city were hit by an air-strike and artillery fire. The next day, the military slightly advanced in the al-Suweiqa area of Old Aleppo, although some saw the assault on Old Aleppo as a diversionary attack so the Army could take control of the Handarat Camp where fighting continued.

On 29 September, pro-government forces broke through the last rebel defense line in the Handarat Camp and once again took complete control of the district. In order to secure Handarat Camp, government troops continued with their assault and attacked the nearby Shaqayf district, as well as the Kindi Hospital. The next morning, after heavy clashes, pro-government forces captured the Kindi Hospital, thus fortifying their positions at the Handarat Camp and coming within two kilometers of the Jandoul roundabout. Soon after, the military started an operation against the rebel-held central district of Suleiman Al-Halabi and advanced, seizing much of its western sector. However, after advancing, government troops withdrew and the rebels recaptured their lost positions. During the fighting in Suleiman Al-Halabi, which was described as "back and forth", a water station was bombed, with both sides trading blame. The Army was trying to reach the rebel-held station since it was the main water source for the government-held part of Aleppo. Later in the day, the rebels reentered the Kindi hospital, reigniting fighting for the building, while the Army reportedly captured the northwestern part of the Bustan Al-Basha district. The rebels eventually managed to recapture the hospital.

On 1 October, the Syrian Army continued to advance in the Bustan Al-Basha district, while elsewhere government forces captured Tal Shuqayf hill and 16 nearby buildings, establishing fire control over the Aleppo Armament Base and the Shuqayf Industrial Area. The next day, the Army seized the Shuqayf Industrial area, the Jandoul beltway and the Kindi Hospital. During the Army's gains at Shuqayf, the Kurdish YPG militia also advanced against the rebels at the Jandoul roundabout. Meanwhile, Army advances in Bustan Al-Basha continued, with government forces reaching the outskirts of the al-Heluk district, while a new Army attack on the Suleiman Al-Halabi water station was again repelled. Elsewhere, the largest hospital in the rebel part of the city, known as M10, was once again bombed. At this point, the Army called on the rebels to withdraw from Aleppo, offering them safe passage and aid supplies.

=== Syrian Army push on three fronts ===
On 3 October, Syrian government forces attacked the Owaija district and reportedly seized a quarter of the area before sundown, while the Army established fire control over the Jandoul roundabout. The same day, the M10 hospital was bombed for the third time and completely destroyed. On 4 October, the rebels claimed that an Army assault on the southern Sheikh Sa'id district had been repelled, while a government source stated they had reached a bridge in the northwestern part of the district. Meanwhile, the military advanced in the city center, capturing several high-rise buildings, as well as in the factories area of the northern Owaija district. For the first time in four years, Syrian Army tanks crossed the frontline in Aleppo.

On 5 October, Syrian Army advances continued in the northern district of Owaija and the southern district of Al-Amiriyah. As of 6 October, government forces were in control of 50–80% of the Bustan Al-Basha district and the northern Bakarah Quarries that overlook the Kindi Hospital. With the new advances in Bustan Al-Basha, the Army was closing in on the Suleiman Al-Halabi water station from two sides and by dusk they had secured the Suleiman Al-Halabi district. Later that night, the Army made advances in the Salah al-Din district and the Bureij area, while they had also reportedly taken control of half of the Sheikh Sa'id district.

Early on 7 October, Syrian government forces continued to assault Sheikh Sa'id, seizing Tal Sheikh Sa'eed hill. Still, the rebels managed to recapture other territory in the district they had lost. The next day, the rebels were able to reclaim large parts of Sheikh Sa'id and several points around the water station in Suleiman Al-Halabi, leaving them in control of 20% of that district. Still, despite this, government forces took complete control of the Owaija district and the Jandoul roundabout. Subsequently, the Army took control of over 50% of the nearby Manashar Al-Breij district. Army advances also continued in Bustan Al-Basha.

On 9 October, back-and-forth fighting raged in Sheikh Sa'id and Bustan Al-Basha. By this point, government forces had seized 15–20% of the rebel-held part of Aleppo, with the rebels struggling to maintain a stable frontline due to a lack of sufficient resources, which had also been impacted by the heavy air campaign against their positions and ammo depots, to counter Army advances.

=== Syrian Army secures northern outskirts; Fourth line of attack started ===
Early on 10 October, Syrian government troops seized Tal Sifan hill, near Owaija, and the following day consolidated their control of the Jandoul roundabout. Two days later, the Army seized four hills in the northeast of Aleppo, including one that overlooks the Hanano Youth Housing Complex. Advances in the northeast of Aleppo continued into 14 October, with the Syrian Army making its first push towards the Youth Housing Complex. The military also made an effort to open a route between the north of Aleppo and the airport in the south, managing to take control of most of the Al-Aradh Al-Hamra district in the southeast of Aleppo. Meanwhile, the M10 hospital was once again hit with a bunker-buster bomb.

On 15 October, Syrian government forces advanced near the Ba'idayn roundabout, in the north of Aleppo, amid heavy fighting; advanced on the Nayrab Bridge-al-Miysar district; and seized parts of the nearby Karm al-Trab neighborhood. They also advanced on the Nayrab Bridge-al-Miysar district axis from the direction of the airport, fully securing the Al-Aradh Al-Hamra district, and seized parts of the nearby Karm al-Trab neighborhood. In the evening, government troops penetrated rebel defense lines at the Ba'idayn roundabout, capturing the surrounding factories.

== Aftermath – Halt to air-strikes; Rebel counter-offensive ==
On 17 October, Russia announced that it would temporarily halt airstrikes on eastern Aleppo for eight hours on 20 October, in order to allow some civilians and rebels to evacuate. The strikes had been halted two days earlier than intended, on the morning of 18 October, and the suspension continued into the next day when it was announced the truce scheduled to take place on 20 October, would be extended to three days until 22 October. Rebel officials completely rejected the proposal on evacuating.

Fighting reportedly resumed on 22 October. However, Russia declared the ceasefire would continue.

On 28 October, rebel forces outside Aleppo began a counter-offensive to break the siege.

== Reactions and analysis ==
Syria's president Bashar al-Assad said that the conflict had become a proxy war between the Russian and US superpowers, who were still embroiled in a Cold War. According to him, the offensive was a necessary step towards pushing terrorists out of Syria and into Turkey.

Reuters and the Los Angeles Times described the offensive as a possible turning point in the war.

At the United Nations, the U.S. Ambassador to the UN, Samantha Power, accused Russia of "barbarism" because of its air-strikes during the offensive, while the United Kingdom and France accused Russia was involved in war crimes. According to the Los Angeles Times and unnamed "longtime observers" of the Syrian conflict, the Syrian and Russian bombardments in the week of 22–28 September were "marked by unparalleled savagery and suffering".

== See also ==
- Northern Aleppo offensive (February 2016)
- 2016 Southern Aleppo campaign
- 2016 Aleppo campaign
  - Aleppo offensive (June–July 2016)
  - Aleppo offensive (July–August 2016)
  - Aleppo offensive (August–September 2016)
  - Aleppo offensive (October–November 2016)
  - Aleppo offensive (November–December 2016)
