= Aleppo bombings (April–July 2016) =

Battle of Aleppo (2012–2016)

- Part of the Battle of Aleppo (2012–2016)
- Location of Aleppo within Syria
- Location: 36°13′N 37°10′E; Aleppo, Syria
- Date: 22 April – 18 July 2016 (2 months, 3 weeks and 5 days)
- Target: Military and civilians
- Attack type: Airstrikes and bombardments
- Weapons: Aerial bombs, rockets, artillery and chemical weapons
- Deaths: 525 civilians killed by government and Russian bombardment (SOHR); 416 killed by rebel bombardment (SOHR)
- Perpetrators: Syrian Air Force; Russian Air Force; Fatah Halab; Al Nusra Front

The Aleppo bombings (April–July 2016) were intense bombardments on both rebel and government-held areas in the city of Aleppo, Syria starting in late April 2016. Rebel shelling also targeted a Kurdish-held part of the city. The bombings decreased in intensity after 55 days when a temporary truce was established on 16 June 2016. However, the bombings continued through July.

== Notable attacks ==
=== Al-Quds Hospital ===
On 27 April 2016, four consecutive airstrikes in the opposition-held Sukkari district of Aleppo hit and destroyed al-Quds hospital and nearby homes. Witnesses said a missile from a low-flying fighter jet hit the hospital directly. The Syrian Observatory for Human Rights said at least 27 people were killed. Médecins Sans Frontières (MSF) helped to support the hospital and initially said 14 patients and medical staff were killed. On 4 May 2016, MSF released a statement saying the death toll had risen to 55 after more bodies were found. According to MSF, the pediatric unit of the hospital was almost completely destroyed and the emergency room and laboratory were both entirely destroyed. MSF said the hospital would not be able to reopen for at least two weeks.

NPR reported that Russia and the Syrian government were the only two groups with aircraft in the area. According to a US State Department official, there were indications the Syrian government solely conducted the bombing of the hospital. The Guardian reported that the attack was "part of a broader pattern of systematic targeting of hospitals by the government of Bashar al-Assad". No one claimed responsibility for the airstrike.

=== Malla Khan mosque ===
On 29 April, the Malla Khan mosque and lodge in the government-controlled Bab al-Faraj neighborhood was hit by rockets, killing at least 15 worshippers and injuring more. The Syrian government reported that Syrian rebels were behind the attack.

=== Al-Dabit hospital ===
On 3 May, the Syrian rebels fired more rockets at government territory and killed 19 people. The rockets hit a hospital and killed 3 and wounded 17.

=== Alleged chemical attacks ===
On 2 August, Russia accused the Nour al-Din al-Zenki Movement of using chemical weapons on government soldiers and civilians in Aleppo, killing at least seven and injuring more.

== Reactions ==
- United Nations - The UN Syria envoy Staffan de Mistura condemned the attack on the al-Quds Hospital and believes that it was a deliberate war crime. The UN High Commissioner for Human Rights also condemned the "monstrous disregard for civilian lives by all parties to the conflict."
- France - The French government "utterly condemn the bombing targeted against Al Quds Hospital in Aleppo" and called for a meeting of the International Syria Support Group.
- Qatar - The Qatari envoy to the Arab League has called for a league meeting to discuss the "dangerous escalation seen in Aleppo were civilians are subjected to massacres at the hands of the forces of the Syrian regime, which led to the deaths and injuries of hundreds."
- United States - The US State Department was "outraged by yesterday's airstrikes in Aleppo on the al-Quds hospital supported by both Doctors Without Borders and the International Committee of the Red Cross, which killed dozens of people, including children, patients, and medical personnel."
