= Liwa al-Quds =

Palestinian brigade of the Syrian military during Ba'athist rule

- لواء القدس
- Active: September 2013 – December 2024
- Country: Ba'athist Syria
- Allegiance: Syrian Armed Forces
- Branch: Syrian Army
- Type: Paramilitary; Commando
- Role: Shock troops Close-quarters combat Counter-insurgency; Counter-terrorism
- Size: c. 5,000-7,000 (2022)
- Part of: 5th Assault Corps
- Garrison/HQ: Aleppo, Daraa
- Nickname: "Fedayeen Assad"
- Engagements: Syrian Civil War; Battle of Aleppo (2012–2016); Operation Canopus Star; Operation Rainbow; Aleppo offensive (July 2015); Ithriyah-Raqqa offensive (February 2016–present); Aleppo offensive (October–December 2015); 2016 Southern Aleppo campaign; Northern Aleppo offensive (2016); Aleppo offensive (June–July 2016); Aleppo offensive (July–August 2016); Aleppo offensive (August–September 2016); Aleppo offensive (September–October 2016); Aleppo offensive (October–November 2016); Aleppo offensive (November–December 2016); Syrian Desert campaign (May–July 2017); Southern Raqqa offensive (June 2017); Central Syria campaign (2017); Rif Dimashq offensive (February-April 2018); 2019 Northwestern Syria Offensive; Syrian Desert campaign (December 2017–December 2024); 2024 Syrian opposition offensives

Commanders
- Current Commander: Col. Muhammad al-Sa'eed (a.k.a. "The Engineer")
- Notable commanders: Col. Mohammad Rafi †

Insignia
- Flag

Liwa al-Quds (Arabic: لواء القدس; meaning the Jerusalem Brigade) was a paramilitary group and Syrian Army brigade that operated as a part of pro-Syrian government forces in the Syrian Civil War. The group was composed mostly of Sunni Palestinians from Neirab camp, an area that was subjected to prolonged sieges imposed by the armed opposition.

In 2019, it became a part of the Syrian Army's 5th Assault Corps. It was formed in 2013 by the engineer Muhammad al-Sa'eed. The fighters who called themselves the "Syrian Arab Army Fedayeen" were active in Aleppo and Daraa. The paramilitary was also composed of refugees from Ein Al-Tal camp as well as reconciled rebels.

== Command structure ==
Al-Quds Brigade (2021)

- Lions of al-Quds Battalion
- Defenders of Aleppo Battalion
- Deterrence Battalion
- Lions of al-Shahba Battalion

== Combat history ==
Liwa al-Quds was founded in 2013 as a pro-government militia, reportedly with the support of the Air Force Intelligence Directorate. Syrian opposition supporters regarded them as Shabiha.

By the beginning of 2015, the group had suffered 200 killed and over 400 wounded since its establishment. The group supported the Syrian Army in its effort to reopen the main supply line to Aleppo in late 2015.

By mid-2016, it had become one of the most important pro-government paramilitary groups in Aleppo Governorate. On 20 June 2016, the group took part in a prisoner exchange with three rebel factions, namely the Sultan Murad Division, the Muntasir Billah Brigade, and the Nour al-Din al-Zenki Movement, in coordination with Ahrar al-Sham.

In June 2017, Liwa al-Quds launched a recruitment campaign in Homs Governorate, where it aimed at enlisting young Palestinian refugees.

In May 2018 Liwa al-Quds was fighting against the ISIL pocket in the desert of Deir ez-Zor Governorate as a part of joint operation with the NDF and SAA forces. Liwa al-Quds captured the village of Faydat Umm Muwaynah.

In July 2018, Samer Rafe, a prominent commander of the militia, was arrested in Latakia after a firefight with government forces. He had previously been arrested on charges of robbery in Aleppo, confessed to the charges, and served a prison term of one year before being released.

In the first half of 2019, Liwa al-Quds suffered heavy casualties on multiple fronts, most notably during Operation Dawn of Idlib. As of 2019, the Liwa al-Quds had more than 1,100 fighters killed during the Syrian civil war. In March 2024, IS fighters ambushed a Liwa al-Quds vehicle carrying ammunition and guns in eastern Homs countryside, killing the three guards and capturing the cargo.

Liwa al-Quds was among the loyalist units which unsuccessfully tried to halt the 2024 Syrian opposition offensives. As rebels advanced into Aleppo, Liwa al-Quds retreated from its local base in the Neirab camp without organizing resistance on 30 November. After the fall of the Assad regime in December 2024, the Syrian transitional government demanded that all Palestinian armed groups in Syria disarm themselves, dissolve their military formations, and instead focus on political and charitable work.

== Composition ==
The brigade had both Syrian Palestinian as well as native Syrian members. The brigade had close connections to both Iran and Russia, and was supplied as well as trained by the Russian Armed Forces. Its fighters referred to themselves as "Syrian Arab Army Fedayeen", showcasing their loyalty to the Syrian military. Before the government victory in the Battle of Aleppo, the brigade consisted of three main battalions, which are: Lions of al-Quds Battalion, which operated in al-Nayrab camp and its surrounding as well as in southern and eastern countryside of Aleppo; the Deterrence Battalion, which operated in the north Aleppo countryside south of the villages of Nubl and Al-Zahraa; and the Lions of al-Shahba' Battalion, which operated inside Aleppo city.

By 2018, the group had started recruiting former Syrian rebels that agreed to join pro-government military units as part of reconciliation deals with the Syrian government. More than 150 former Free Syrian Army fighters had joined Liwa al-Quds by 2019. They received military training and supervision from Russian officers during the first quarter of 2019. In fall 2019, Liwa al-Quds became part of the Syrian Army's 5th Assault Corps as autonomous brigade.

== See also ==
- List of armed groups in the Syrian Civil War
- Palestinians in Syria
