= Army of Conquest =

Joint command centre of Islamist rebel factions in the Syrian Civil War

- جيش الفتح
- Dates active: 24 March 2015 – 27 January 2017
- Groups: Al-Nusra Front; Ahrar al-Sham; Sham Legion; Jaysh al-Sunna; Liwa al-Haqq; Ajnad al-Sham; Turkistan Islamic Party (joined in May 2016); Suqour al-Sham Brigades (Joined September 2016); Nour al-Din al-Zenki Movement (joined October 2016); Jund al-Aqsa (left October 2015); Ajnad al-Kavkaz (joined around June 2015, left by May 2016); Imam Bukhari Jamaat (joined around June 2015, left by May 2016)
- Headquarters: Idlib, Syria
- Active regions: Syria
- Ideology: Sunni Islamism
- Size: 50,000+
- Wars: the Syrian Civil War

The Army of Conquest (Arabic: جيش الفتح) or Jaish al-Fatah, abbreviated JaF, was a joint command center of Sunni Islamist Syrian rebel factions participating in the Syrian Civil War.

The alliance was formed in March 2015 under the supervision and coordination of Saudi cleric Abdullah al-Muhaysini. It consisted of Islamist rebel factions mainly active in the Idlib Governorate, with some factions active in the Hama and Latakia Governorates. In the course of the following months, it seized most of Idlib Governorate.

The Institute for the Study of War described the Army of Conquest as an "anti-regime" and "anti-Hezbollah" powerbroker operating in the Idlib, Hama, Daraa and Quneitra Governorates. The Army of Conquest was described by the Tony Blair Institute for Global Change as an "al-Qaeda led coalition" which was working towards the ultimate goal of creating an "Islamic state."

== Participants ==
At its founding, the Army of Conquest contained six members, two of whom (al-Nusra and Jund al-Aqsa) were directly connected to al-Qaeda. With Ahrar al-Sham being the largest group, al-Nusra and Ahrar al-Sham together were reported to represent 90 percent of the troops. Another prominent Islamist faction in the operations room was Sham Legion (Faylaq Al-Sham). The remaining three founding members were Jaish al-Sunna; Liwa al-Haqq, and Ajnad al-Sham. The Army of Conquest collaborated with more moderate Free Syrian Army factions such as Knights of Justice Brigade.

The coalition's initial success was attributed to its strong coherence, with the name of individual factions being forbidden when the group conducts joint operations.

Since the inter-rebel conflicts across Idlib, which led to Ahrar al-Sham clashing with Jabhat Fateh al-Sham, and the defections and mergers which started on 21 January 2017, the Army of Conquest has become defunct.

== History ==
=== Formation ===
The Army of Conquest declared its formation on 24 March 2015. On the same day, a pro-opposition source claimed that about fifty Syrian government soldiers defected to the new group. As columnist David Ignatius reported, Qatar, Turkey, and Saudi Arabia were the primary sponsors of the new coalition that was led by al-Nusra. Since the very beginning, the three states allegedly provided conspicuous material support to the group, mostly consisting of weapons and military equipment. In 2016, shortly after al-Nusra changed its name in Jabhat Fatah al-Sham, Financial Times reporter Erica Solomon quoted rebels and activists claiming that Qatar and Saudi Arabia were consistently ferrying in cash and supplies to support a military offensive in Aleppo directed by Jabhat Fatah al-Sham.

The Army of Conquest captured Idlib City on 28 March 2015. In the following months, they spearheaded an offensive that drove out government forces from almost all of Idlib Governorate. Following this success, additional branches of the Army of Conquest were established in other parts of Syria.

The Army of Conquest coalition was partially modelled upon the success of the Southern Front of the Free Syrian Army, and in turn newer coalitions, like the Battle of Victory, were modelled on the Army of Conquest.

Saudi cleric Abdullah al-Muhaysini played a key role in the early history of the Army of Conquest. In fact, Muhayisini coordinated and supervised the establishment of the group, for which he also served as a religious judge and leader. He was targeted by U.S. Treasury Sanctions on 10 November 2016, for his role as mediator and recruiter on behalf of the al-Nusra Front. Notably, Muhaysini also collected material and financial support for al-Nusra from the Gulf, especially, Qatar, and was known for his public endorsement of Qatar-based "Madid Ahl al-Sham", a most effective fundraising campaign which al-Nusra itself acknowledged as "one of the preferred conduits for donations".

=== Expansion to other parts of Syria ===
In early May 2015, the Army of Conquest formed a new branch in Western Qalamoun, called Army of Conquest – al-Qalamoun. On 1 October 2015, after defeats by pro-Assad forces, Army of Conquest in Qalamoun was replaced by an independent faction called Saraya Ahl al-Sham, which aims to unite all rebel factions in Western Qalamoun. However, the al-Nusra Front was not included in Saraya Ahl al-Sham, although the two groups continued to cooperate.

The following month, the al-Nusra Front issued a statement calling on the opposition in the Eastern Ghouta area of Damascus to form a similar coalition, but this call was rejected by the Unified Military Command of Eastern Ghouta, a grouping which included the most prominent factions in the area.

In October 2015 Army of Conquest members al-Nusra Front and Ahrar ash-Sham (also a member of the Unified Military Command of Eastern Ghouta), along with other groups formed Jund al-Malahm, an operations room in the Eastern Ghouta area of Damascus, in direct competition with the Unified Military Command of Eastern Ghouta operations room.

On 20 June, the Army of Conquest in the southern region was established and immediately took part in the campaign in Quneitra. The coalition includes Ahrar al-Sham, al-Nusra Front, the Fatah al-Sham Coalition, Ihyaa al-Jihad Brigade, Mujahideen of Nawa Gathering, Lions of Unity Brigade, Ansar al-Haq Brigade, and the Islamic Brigade of al- Omarein.

In July 2016, the al-Nusra Front renamed itself as Jabhat Fatah al-Sham, restructured the group further, and began to create propaganda to support their offensives across the Aleppo Governorate.

=== Restructuring ===
On 23 October 2015, Jund al-Aqsa announced a split from Jaysh al-Fatah, reportedly due to disagreements with Ahrar al-Sham over the application of Islamic law in areas under their control. Following this development, there were unconfirmed reports that al-Nusra Front, in an act of solidarity with Jund al-Aqsa, left the coalition, or that Jund al-Aqsa would be rejoining Jaysh al-Fateh. In January 2016, the Sham Legion announced it was leaving the group, ostensibly to redeploy its forces to Aleppo, but also due to tensions with Jund al-Aqsa.

In May 2016, the Army of Conquest announced it was restructuring, ending ties with Jund al-Aqsa while readmitting the Sham Legion. It was also joined by the Turkistan Islamic Party, a jihadist group composed of Uyghurs from Xinjiang.

On 24 September 2016, Nour al-Din al-Zenki Movement joined the group. Several days later, the Suqour al-Sham Brigade also joined the group.

On 9 October, Jund al-Aqsa rejoined Al-Nusra Front, thus rejoining the Army of Conquest, though on 23 January 2017 they were kicked out of Al-Nusra and by extension the Army of Conquest.

On 23 January 2017, the al-Nusra Front attacked Jabhat Ahl al-Sham bases in Atarib and other towns in western Aleppo. All of their bases were captured and by 24 January, the group was defeated and joined Ahrar al-Sham.

=== Battles ===
Date	Battle	Place	Against	Result
24–28 March 2015	Second Battle of Idlib	Idlib	Ba'athist Syria	Victory
22 April – 14 June 2015	Northwestern Syria offensive (April–June 2015)	Idlib and Hama Governorates	Ba'athist Syria	Victory
4 May – 21 June 2015	Qalamoun offensive	Qalamun	Hezbollah; Ba'athist Syria	Defeat
28 July–28 August 2015	Al-Ghab Offensive	Idlib Governorate	Ba'athist Syria	Victory
28 March 2015 – 19 July 2018	Siege of Al-Fu'ah and Kafarya	Idlib Governorate	Ba'athist Syria	Victory
March – 9 September 2015	Siege of Abu al-Duhur Airbase	Idlib Governorate	Ba'athist Syria	Victory
7 October – 10 November 2015	Northwestern Syria offensive (October–November 2015)	Hama Governorate	Ba'athist Syria	Indecisive
1 April – 18 June 2016	2016 Southern Aleppo campaign	Aleppo Governorate	Ba'athist Syria	Victory
27 June – 12 August 2016	2016 Latakia offensive	Latakia Governorate	Ba'athist Syria	Defeat
31 July – 6 August 2016	Aleppo offensive (July–August 2016)	Aleppo Governorate	Ba'athist Syria	Victory
11 August – 11 September 2016	Aleppo offensive (August–September 2016)	Aleppo Governorate	Ba'athist Syria	Defeat
22 September – 16 October 2016	Aleppo offensive (September–October 2016)	Aleppo Governorate	Ba'athist Syria; Russia; Iran	Defeat
28 October – 12 November 2016	Aleppo offensive (October–November 2016)	Aleppo Governorate	Ba'athist Syria; Russia; Iran	Defeat
15 November – 22 December 2016	Aleppo offensive (November–December 2016)	Aleppo Governorate	Ba'athist Syria; Russia; Iran	Defeat

== War crimes ==
On 11 June 2015, the al-Nusra Front killed at least 20 Druze villagers in Qalb Lawzeh in Idlib province.

== See also ==
- List of armed groups in the Syrian Civil War
