= Aleppo offensive (June–July 2016) =

Offensive in Syrian civil war

- Part of the 2016 Aleppo summer campaign, Battle of Aleppo and the Syrian Civil War
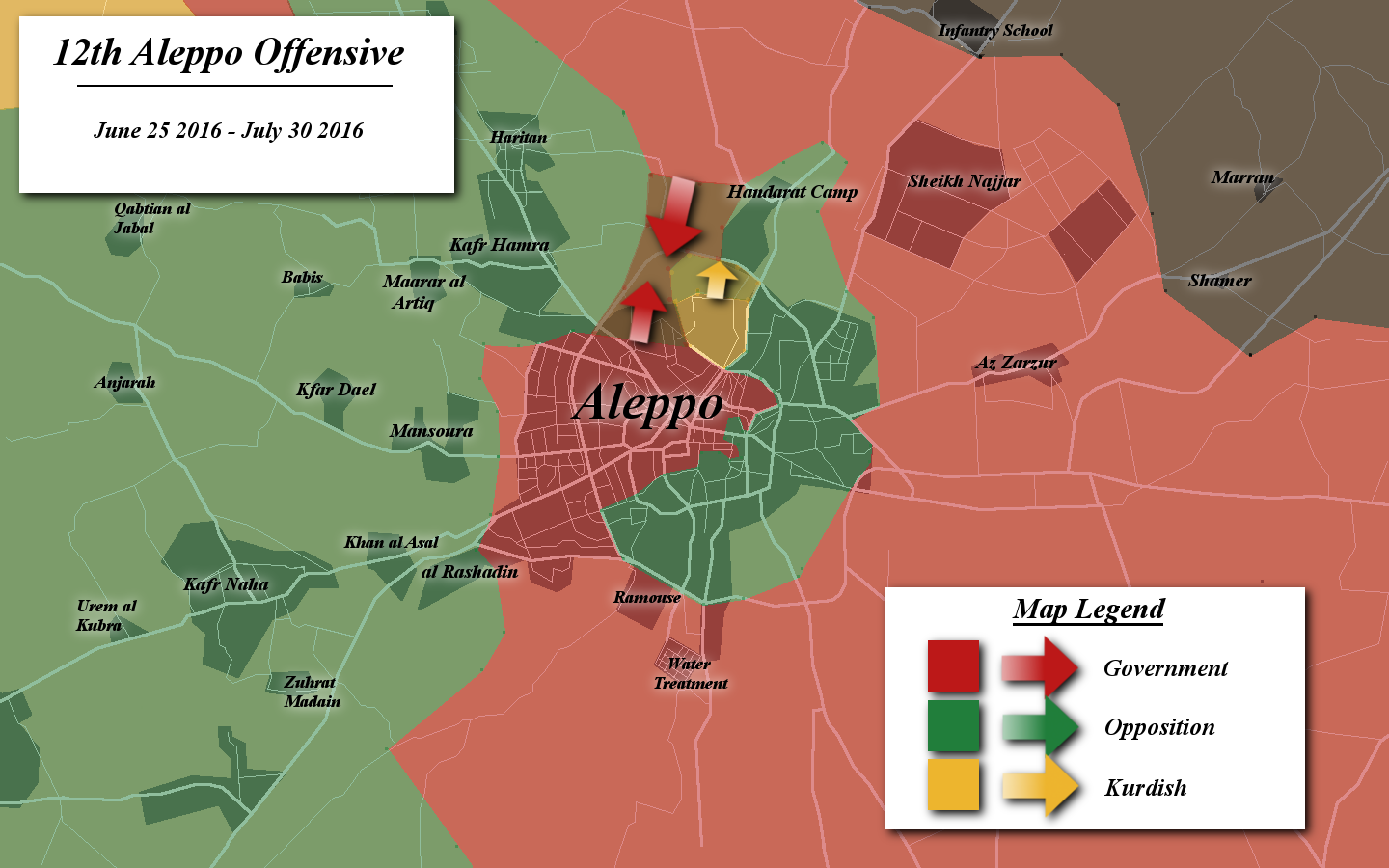
- Battle map of Aleppo during July 2016
Date	25 June – 30 July 2016 (1 month and 5 days)
Location	Northern Aleppo, Syria
Result	Syrian Army advances; Rebel counter-offensive: Army captures Castello road, besieging rebel-held areas of Aleppo; Army captures the al-Layramoun, Bani Zeid and Ashrafiyah districts; Army advances in the al-Khalidiyah district; Five rebel counter-attacks on Castello Road and in Aleppo repelled

Belligerents
(Syria) Syrian Arab Republic: Syrian Armed Forces; National Defence Forces; Liwa al-Quds; Ba'ath Brigades; Hezbollah; Airstrikes: Russia: Aerospace Forces; Syrian Democratic Forces (since 27 July): YPG; YPJ	Fatah Halab; Al-Nusra Front; Ahrar al-Sham Leon Sedov Brigade

Commanders and leaders
Maj. Gen. Suhayl al-Hasan (Tiger Forces chief commander); Haj Sameer Ali Awada † (Hezbollah top commander, alleged); Ali Muhammad Mustafa Khalil † (Imam al Hujja Regiment commander) Unknown YPG commander †	Ammar Shaaban † (Nour al-Din al-Zenki Movement top commander); Abu 'Abdo Saroukh † (Nour al-Din al-Zenki Movement commander); Col. Mohammad Bakkar † (Sham Legion top commander); Zuheir Harba † (Sham Legion field commander); Feisal Balkash † (Sham Legion commander); Abdel-Rahman Mansour † (Islamic Safwah Movement commander); Khattab Abou Ahmad † (Abu Amara Battalion chief commander); Hammoud al-Barm † (Army of Mujahideen commander); Yassin Najjar † (Abu Amara Battalion commander)

Units involved
Syrian Army: 4th Mechanized Division; Republican Guard; Tiger Forces; Hezbollah units: Syrian Hezbollah groups; Imam Mahdi Brigade; National Ideological Resistance; Imam al Hujja Regiment	Fatah Halab: Nour al-Din al-Zenki Movement; Sham Legion; Jaysh al-Islam; Abu Amara Battalion; Free Syrian Army; Fastaqim Kama Umirt; Army of Victory; Army of Mujahideen; 16th Division; Ahrar al-Sham

Casualties and losses
87+ killed (SOHR claim)	88+ killed (SOHR claim) 300+ killed (pro-government claim)

The Aleppo offensive (June–July 2016) refers to a military operation launched on the northern outskirts of Aleppo in late June 2016, by the Syrian Army. The aim of the offensive was to cut the last rebel supply line into Aleppo city.

== The offensive ==
=== Northern Army advances and capture of the Mallah Farms ===
The offensive on 25 June, was preceded by heavy Russian air-strikes. Heavy ground bombardment was also involved before the ground offensive was launched. The pro-government al-Watan newspaper said the amount of firepower used was "unprecedented," with local sources describing the fighting in the area as "World War III". Overall, heavy mortars, rocket launchers, airstrikes and tank fire were used. The Army attempted to advance in the northwestern part of the city, as well as in the Mallah farmlands to the north, near the Castello Road, the rebels' last supply route into Aleppo. Initially, the Army managed to capture several positions in the northwestern al-Zahra and al-Khalidiyah districts of Aleppo. By the next morning, over a 5-hour period, the Russian Air Force had conducted over 60 air-strikes against rebel positions.

On 26 June, the military made advances into the Mallah Farms, and by 28 June, they had captured half of the farmlands, including the Al-Asamat and Arab Salum areas. The advances brought the Castello Road within firing range of the military's artillery. Concurrently with the government's advances, the Russian Air Forces continued conducting heavy air-strikes, with just 30 strikes on the morning of 27 June, above the Handarat Mountains and Anadan Plains. Still, despite the advances, the Army was unable to advance by nightfall into the western and southern farms of Malaah, despite repeated attempts over the previous day. On 28 June, the military advanced in al-Khalidiyah towards the industrial zone of al-Layramoun and Bani Zeid.

On 29 June, an initial rebel counter-attack at Mallah was repelled. Still, later in the day, the rebels used two suicide car bombers, forcing the military to withdraw from all areas they had captured at Mallah. It was initially reported government forces had retreated to regroup for a new assault. However, subsequently it was stated it was a tactical retreat so to lure rebel forces into a trap and inflict maximum casualties. Following this, on 30 June, government forces managed to retake all positions they had lost the previous day.

Between 2 and 3 July, the Army advanced in the southern farms of Mallah, coming within two kilometers of cutting the Castelo Road. On 3 July, a Russian cruise missile reportedly destroyed a rebel TOW storage base in western Aleppo. The same day, the military captured the Shbeib factory and several nearby blocks in the al-Layramoun district of Aleppo. The following day, a rebel counter-attack, which included a suicide bomber, was repelled. At the same time, the Army captured more positions in the southern part of Mallah, bringing 65–75 percent of the farms area under its control. A new rebel counter-attack in Mallah was also repelled.

After midnight on 7 July, amid heavy airstrikes, pro-government forces captured the southern part of Mallah and came within one kilometer of the Castello Road. They captured a mosque complex and a hill which overlook the Castello Road, thus enabling them to bring the road under artillery fire-control. This effectively cut off the only supply route to the rebel-held part of Aleppo. The rebels sent in reinforcements in an attempt to retake the area; however, an assault against the hill was repelled.

On 8 July, the Kurdish YPG launched an assault of their own from the Kurdish-held northern part of Aleppo city against the rebel-held Youth Housing Complex, located alongside the Castello Road. Meanwhile, the military made more advances in the Mallah area, coming within 250 meters of the Castello Road. Elsewhere in Aleppo city, rebel shelling of government-held areas killed 23–34 civilians and wounded 140–200.

=== Rebel counter-attacks repelled, southern Army advances ===
On 9 July, the rebels launched a counter-attack against government positions near the Castello Road, which was led by two suicide car-bombers. Initially, the rebels recaptured some areas near the Castello Road, but subsequently lost them again, as the military managed to repel the attack. During the assault, the rebels were also confronted with mines placed by the military. Meanwhile, the Army advanced in the al-Layramoun and al-Khalidiyah districts. Later that night, heavy Russian air-strikes hit rebel forces along the road to the Mallah Farms, as the rebels were regrouping for a second attempt to reopen the Castello Road. A third suicide car-bomb was also used. By the following day, the rebel counter-attack at Mallah had been halted. Overall, 29–75 rebels were killed in the failed counter-attack, reportedly also including seven commanders.

Early on 10 July, government forces reportedly advanced in Bani Zeid. Furthermore, rebels claimed to have killed Haj Sameer Ali Awada, one of the most prominent Hezbollah commanders in Syria, during clashes in the northern Aleppo countryside. Hezbollah denied this, maintaining that he had died of illness in a Lebanese hospital.

Following the failed attempt to reopen the Castello Road, there were reports of a crisis between the Army of Conquest and Fatah Halab due to disagreements over Aleppo. Jaysh al-Fateh reportedly wanted to stop the fighting at Mallah altogether and were trying to organize Fatah Halab, but few if any in Aleppo wanted to take commands from Idlib, and therefore Jaysh al-Fateh's was losing patience as Aleppo commanders were preferring to lose men, ammunition and materials for what they saw as a lost battle. Jaysh al-Fateh wanted to begin an offensive south of Aleppo rather than at Mallah with a serious strategy, but Fatah Halab reportedly would not agree to this.

On 11 July, the rebels made an attempt to relieve pressure on the Mallah front by attacking Aleppo's city center. The assault started with the detonation of a tunnel bomb that killed 19 soldiers. After the tunnel blast, a group of 7 rebel fighters emerged behind Army lines from another tunnel on a suicide mission to inflict maximum casualties. Initially, the rebels managed to capture 10 buildings before they were pushed back and the attack was ultimately repelled. Meanwhile, government troops made more advances towards the al-Layramoun roundabout, as they captured the Sadkop Gas Factory. Pro-government Palestinian militiamen were also reported to have captured several areas at the Handarat Camp.

On 12 July, the rebels made a diversionary attack on the Al-Breij front, in the northeast of Aleppo, and then conducted their main assault against Mallah again. Initially, they made some gains, including capturing a strategic hill. However, they were once again pushed back by heavy artillery fire and air-strikes by the next day. Meanwhile, the military made more progress in the Bani Zeid district.

Following the second failed rebel counter-attack against the Castello Road, the Ahrar al-Sham rebel group, which had not participated in the offensive, criticized rebel forces who were attempting to retake the Mallah Farms by stating it was "military suicide. It only yields defeat and collapsed morale". Ahrar al-Sham was itself criticized by other rebel groups for not participating in the fighting.

By the evening of 13 July, the military secured the whole al-Khalidiyah district and most of the al-Layramoun industrial area, after capturing the last several rebel-held buildings in al-Khalidiyah, as well as al-Layramoun's gas factory, market and glass factory. Three days later, the Army made a new advance, supported by Russian air-strikes, in the al-Layramoun district, while the rebels retook some positions in Bani Zeid.

=== Army cuts Castello Road and captures al-Layramoun and Bani Zeid ===
On 17 July, the Army and Hezbollah reached the Castello Road, capturing parts of it and completely cutting it after taking control of Castello Hill. With this advance, the rebel-held part of Aleppo city was fully besieged and the al-Layramoun roundabout came under artillery fire-control. Government forces then proceeded to set up sandbag barriers on the road. Meanwhile, the military made more advances in the Bani Zeid and al-Layramoun areas, capturing most of the factories. Later in the day, a rebel counter-attack managed to retake some territory in the area of the Castello Road, but the road still remained cut. A rebel commander stated they do not have any tunnel or strategic stockpile to feed 300,000 people in the besieged areas. By 18 July, the rebel counter-attack on the Castello highway was repelled.

On 19 July, a government push against the Handarat Camp was underway, with fighting taking place around it, and the Army managed to advance in the area. The same day, al-Zenki Movement fighters recorded themselves beheading a Palestinian child named Abdallah Issa who was aged between 10 and 13. They claimed he had been fighting for the Syrian government in Aleppo with Liwa al-Quds. Liwa al-Quds denied this and claimed the child was a Palestinian refugee. The murder took place north of Aleppo in Handarat, in an unofficial Palestinian refugee camp named Ein El Tal. Following the beheading, the U.S State Department declared that if the video was genuine, they would stop sending Harakat Nour al-Din al-Zenki any military aid.

On 20 July, a new rebel counter-attack against the Castello Road was repelled. Three days later, the Army expanded its control in the al-Layramoun industrial area by capturing the Textile Factory and several nearby buildings. The same day, a tunnel bomb killed 38 pro-government fighters in a building used by government forces. The Levant Revolutionaries Battalions claimed responsibility.

On 25 July, government forces made major advances in the al-Layramoun district, as they were about to break through Fatah Halab's main line of defense in the area. During the day, they took control of 12 industrial buildings and two malls. In course of the clashes, Khattab Abou Ahmad, leader of the rebel Abu Amara Battalion, was killed. Meanwhile, the 16th Division's leadership resigned after the rebel group had suffered heavy casualties during the fighting at al-Layramoun; al-Masdar News considered this as a sign that the 16th Division was collapsing. Later that evening, as the Syrian Army advanced in al-Layramoun, the Tiger Forces captured two sites in and near the Castillo Complex, threatening to cut off the rebels remaining at Bani Zeid and al-Layramoun.

On 26 July, government forces captured all of the al-Layramoun District after heavy fighting for the last rebel stronghold there, the Bus Station. After also seizing the Al-Castillo Amusement Park and imposing fire control over Bani Zeid, the remaining rebel forces in Aleppo City were left almost completely besieged. At the same time, the Tiger Forces began clearing the last farms under Fatah Halab's control near Haritan in northwest Aleppo. The fighting was accompanied by extremely intense airstrikes on the opposition forces, which resulted in the death of Yassin Najjar, commander of the rebel Abu Amara Brigades.

On 27 July, rebel forces attacked the Kurdish-held areas of Aleppo, although their attack was repelled. The Kurds then proceeded to advance into the nearby rebel-held Bani Zeid Youth Housing neighborhood and captured the whole complex. Later that day, the Army officially declared it had cut off all rebel supply routes into Aleppo.

On 28 July, the military captured the Bani Zeid district, as well as the rebel-held parts of the Ashrafiyah district. The rebels withdrew from Bani Zeid before the main Army assault so to avoid heavy losses. The Army then continued to push its assault towards the Dahret Abdrubbah area. The following night, the Syrian Army and Liwa al-Quds attacked the Shaher District in the eastern sector of Handarat Refugee Camp, capturing a number of buildings and killing a large number of al-Zenki fighters, including a commander. Liwa al-Quds claimed that the attack served as revenge for Abdallah Issa, the child who had been beheaded by the rebel group.

At this point, Syrian President Bashar Assad offered a general amnesty to militants who surrender to the government authorities in the next three months. Meanwhile, Russian Defense Minister, Sergei Shoigu, said that President Putin ordered a large-scale humanitarian operation outside Aleppo ”to help civilians who were taken hostage by terrorists as well as fighters who wanted to lay down the arms". Shoigu also mentioned that three humanitarian corridors as well as food and first aid points will be offered outside the city. The rebels prevented residents from fleeing through humanitarian corridors, with only a few residents being able to leave encircled opposition-held districts.

On 30 July, the Kurdish YPG captured the Shuqayyif Youth Housing area, next to the Castello Road. Meanwhile, several rebels from the 16th Division surrendered to the Syrian Army near the districts of Bani Zeid and Old Aleppo.

== See also ==
- Northern Aleppo offensive (February 2016)
- 2016 Southern Aleppo campaign
- Aleppo offensive (July–August 2016)
