= Neirab camp =

Refugee camp in Syria

Coordinates: 36.1733093°N 37.2204351°E

Neirab camp or Al-Nayrab camp is a Palestinian refugee camp that was set up near the village of Al-Neirab, 13 km from Aleppo, Syria. It was created in 1948–1950 following the Nakba.

It is the largest Palestinian refugee camp in Syria, with a reported number of 23,469 people as of 2024. It is also considered one of the poorest.

== History ==
The camp was created in 1948 to accommodate for Palestinian refugees that fled during the Nakba. Originally, the camp consisted of barracks used by allied troops during World War II, but it quickly grew outside of those, due to the number of refugees.

There were plans by the UNRWA to remove the camp in the early 1960s, but those plans didn't come to fruition. In 1988, it was already the largest Palestinian refugee camp in Syria. In 2010s, the barracks were still seen by some refugees as a symbol of their origins and their struggles, even though most, if not all, of the barracks were destroyed since. The camp was described, around this period, as having "the most abysmal living conditions of all the Palestine refugees camps in Syria", by the UNRWA. The Syrian Air Force engaged in raids inside the camp to target militants there in the early 2010s.

A paramilitary group called Liwa al-Quds was formed with people from the camp during the Syrian civil war and was supportive of Bashar al-Assad. In 2016, the camp was cut from water supply for 80 days. The camp has suffered huge emigration, and most of the Palestinian refugees that manage to cross into Turkey from Syria come from Neirab and the nearby Ein Al-Tal camp.

On 28 September 2025, protests took place in the Neirab camp following the shooting of a Palestinian resident of the camp by members of the General Security Service. During these demonstrations, protestors chanted against the Syrian revolution and the Free Syrian Army.

== Population ==
The population inside and on the surroundings of the camp grew quickly, and was at 13,032 people inside and 11,676 outside in 1988. As of 2019, it had a reported population of around 19,000 people, this number grew to a reported number of 23,469 people as of 2024. The population is mostly Sunni Palestinian. They hail mostly from the upper Galilee areas of the cities of Safdouka, Haifa and Tiberias, and from the villages of al-Tira, Lubya, Tarshiha, Hattin, Kweikat, al-Nahr, Safsaf, al-Tajr, Jish, Ain Ghazal, and others. It is considered to be one of the poorer Palestinian refugee camps in Syria, alongside Ein Al-Tal, which is an offroot of Neirab.

== Notable people ==
Neirab camp is the birthplace of the following people:

- Rima Hassan (born 1992), Palestinian–French jurist and member of the European Parliament
