= Aleppo offensive (October–November 2016) =

Syrian military operation

- Part of the Battle of Aleppo (Syrian Civil War)
- Map showing rebel offensive (green arrows, blue dotted captured area) and government counteroffensive (red arrows, blue and red dotted captured areas) Syrian Army control Opposition control (including al-Nusra Front) SDF control Islamic State control Confrontation or unclear situation
Date	28 October – 12 November 2016 (2 weeks and 1 day)
Location	Aleppo, Syria
Result	Syrian Army and allies victory: Rebels captured the Minyan Industrial district, most of the Dahiyat Al-Assad district and half of the Minyan residential district; Army recaptures all areas lost during the offensive, as well as during the summer campaign

Belligerents
(Syria) Syrian Arab Republic; Russia; Iran; Liwa al-Quds; Hezbollah; Harakat Hezbollah al-Nujaba; Ba'ath Brigades; Liwa Fatemiyoun; Liwa Zainebiyoun	Army of Conquest; Fatah Halab; Jabhat Fateh al-Sham; Ansar al-Islam; Jabhat Ansar al-Din

Commanders and leaders
Maj. Gen. Zaid Saleh (Head of Aleppo security committee); Gen. Iyad Mindo (Head of Aleppo Air Force Intelligence Directorate branch); Maj. Gen. Suhayl al-Hasan (Tiger Forces chief commander); Col. Mohammad Jaber (Desert Hawks Brigade commander) (Iran) Hadi Zahid † (Quds Force operations leader in Aleppo) (Iran) Brig. Gen. Mohammad Hosseini Rafei (Imam Sajjad Brigade commander); Akram al-Kaabi (leader of Harakat Hezbollah al-Nujaba)	Mohammed Khair Hassan Shuaib (JFS senior commander); Abu Omar al-Turkistani (TIP senior commander); Abdullah al-Muhaysini (JFS senior cleric); Sheikh Tawfiq Shahab al-Din (leader of Harakat Nour al-Din al-Zenki); Ammar Bouqai (leader of Jaysh al-Sunna) (Syrian opposition) Saqr Abu Quteiba (leader of Fastaqim Union) (Syrian opposition) Ammar Sakkar (Fastaqim Union spokesman) (Syrian opposition) Abu Amr (Levant Front leader); Abu al-Baraa † (Levant Front and Leon Sedov Brigade commander)

Units involved
Syrian Armed Forces; Syrian Army; 1st Armoured Division; 4th Mechanized Division; Republican Guard; Tiger Forces; Desert Hawks Brigade; National Defence Forces; Local Defence Forces; Baqir Brigade; Military Intelligence Directorate; Air Force Intelligence Directorate; Syrian Arab Air Force; Russian Armed Forces; Russian Air Force; Naval Infantry advisors; Special operations forces advisors; IRGC; IRGC Ground Forces; Imam Sajjad Takavar Brigade of Kazerun; 25th Karbala Division; Quds Force; Basij; Hezbollah; Lebanese Hezbollah units; Syrian Hezbollah units; National Ideological Resistance	Army of Conquest; Jabhat Fateh al-Sham; Inghimasi units; Ansar Jihad; Ahrar al-Sham; Ajnad al-Sham; Turkistan Islamic Party in Syria (TIP); Harakat Nour al-Din al-Zenki; Jaysh al-Sunna; Ajnad al-Kavkaz; Fatah Halab; (Syrian opposition) Free Syrian Army; Fastaqim Union (Note: The Fastaqim Union was effectively destroyed in the course of rebel infighting in early November 2016, and mostly merged with Ahrar al-Sham, though remnants of the group remained active.); Levant Front; Leon Sedov Brigade; Army of Mujahideen; Sham Legion; Jaysh al-Nasr; Free Idlib Army; 13th Division; Northern Division; Central Division; Jaish al-Tahrir; Sultan Murad Division; Authenticity and Development Front; 1st Regiment; Jaysh al-Islam; Al-Tawhid Brigade remnants

Strength
1,000+ regular soldiers 1,200–6,500 Liwa Al-Quds fighters	2,000–6,500 fighters 22 main battle tanks 15 infantry fighting vehicles

Casualties and losses
165 killed, 200–300+ wounded (per the Inside Source) 152 killed (per the SOHR)	297 killed, 350–400+ wounded (per the Inside Source); 260 killed (per the SOHR)
- 96–127 civilians killed

The Aleppo offensive of October–November 2016, named the "Battle of the Hero Martyr Abu Omar Saraqib" by the Army of Conquest, refers to a military operation launched on the western outskirts of Aleppo at the end of October 2016 by rebel forces in Syria, against the Syrian government forces and its allies. The aim of the offensive was to establish a new supply line into Aleppo city after an Army-initiated summer campaign had cut off all rebel access to Aleppo.

The rebels called the operation "the mother of all battles", or "the grand battle of Aleppo", and described it as possibly deciding the outcome of the war.

After making early advances, the rebel offensive soon slowed and stalled. By mid-November, government troops regained control of all areas lost at the start of the rebel offensive, as well as areas lost in the earlier rebel offensive during the summer campaign.

== The offensive ==
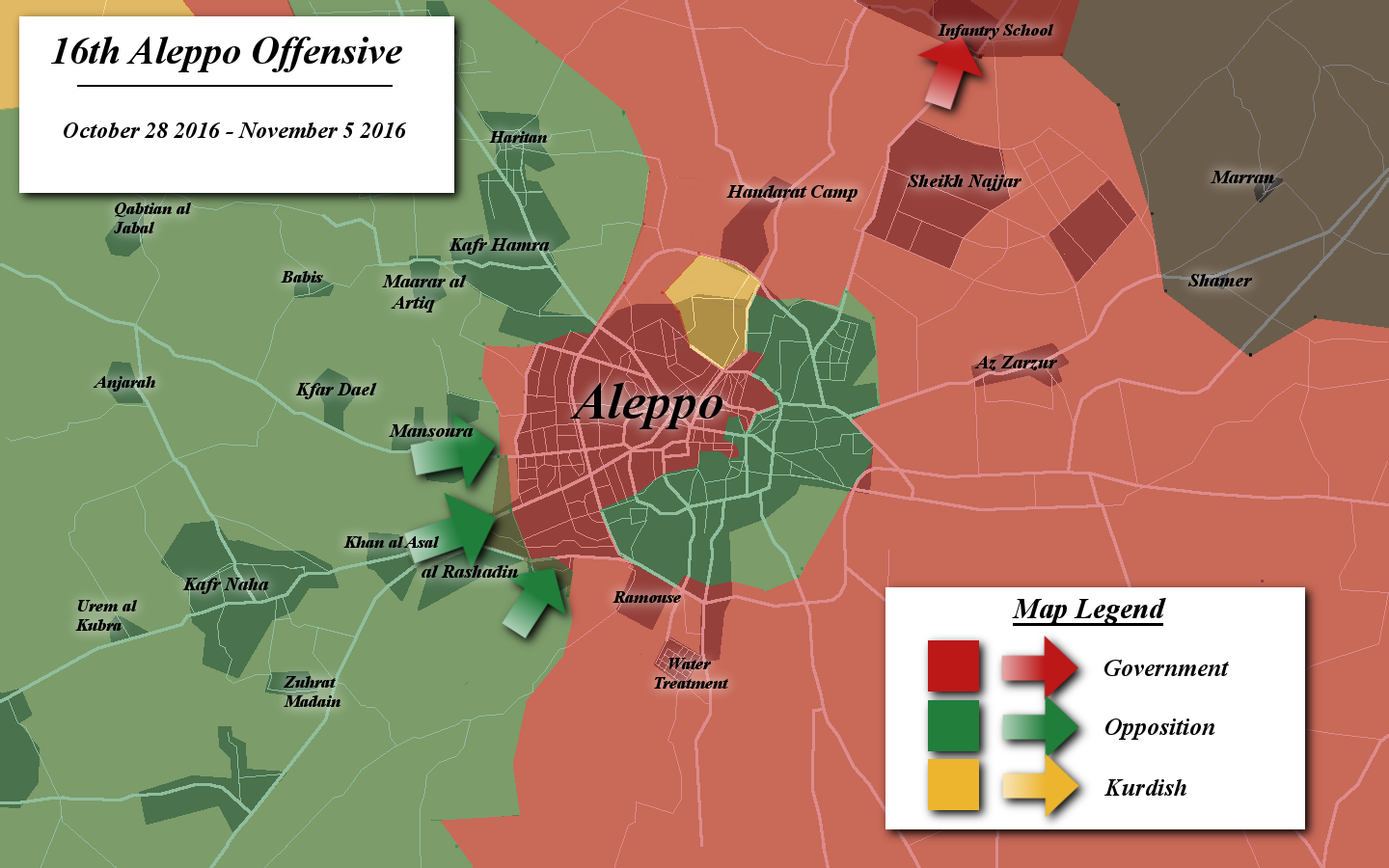
Map of the rebel offensive

On 28 October, rebel forces outside Aleppo fired more than 150 shells, mainly BM-21 Grad rockets, at western Aleppo and the Aleppo International Airport, killing more than 15 civilians and wounding at least 100. Rebel groups then announced that they had begun an offensive against the city after detonating three suicide car bombs, one of which was a tank driven by a French Jabhat Fateh al-Sham suicide bomber. The Army also reportedly destroyed two or four other car bombs.

Rebels in tanks, armored vehicles, bulldozers, makeshift mine sweepers, pick-up trucks and on motorcycles approached the city. The offensive took place along a 15-kilometer stretch of the frontline. Following the attack by the suicide-bombers on the western outskirts of the city, the rebels seized the Minyan Sawmills, Al-Surah Checkpoint, the Cardboard Factory and most of the Dahiyat Al-Assad suburb, while government troops withdrew to the eastern side of the district so they would not be overrun.

Concurrently, a rebel attack from the southwest in the area of the 1070 Housing Project was repelled, with one rebel tank destroyed and the Army retaining its presence in the northeast section of the Housing Project. Rebel attacks on the nearby 3000 Housing Project and the northwestern Zahra district were also repelled.

In all, up to eight car bombs, some remotely controlled, were detonated or destroyed at the start of the offensive. In the evening, the Army launched several surface-to-surface missiles on rebel positions in the west of the city.

The next day, government forces launched a counter-attack against Minyan Industrial and Dahiyat Al-Assad districts. Fighting also took place at the 1070 Housing Project. Later, the rebels started shelling the Hamdaniyah district, in preparation for a new assault, and soon after a suicide car bomb exploded near the Zahra district. The assault against Zahra was eventually repelled, while government troops managed to retake several positions in Dahiyat Al-Assad, where a second suicide car bombing of the day took place. However, by the evening, the rebels managed to take control of the Minyan residential district.

Over the next two days, back and forth fighting took place at the Minyan district, and as of 31 October, control of the district was divided in half.

During this time, the Army had also conducted a new counter-attack against Dahiyat Al-Assad. The rebels also launched their own assault on the New Aleppo district and the 1070 and 3000 Housing Projects, where two suicide car bombers blew themselves up. A rebel tank and a technical were destroyed in the fighting at the 3000 Housing Project. During the clashes, the rebels reportedly shelled a residential area of the Hamdaniyah district with chlorine gas, leaving one civilian dead and 15 people injured. The rebels denied this and claimed government forces had themselves used poison gas at one point of the frontline. Ultimately, the rebel attack on the 3000 Housing Project as well as the nearby military complex was repelled.

By 31 October, the rebel offensive had slowed due to heavy government resistance and pro-government forces had taken the initiative. Three days into the offensive, the rebels were in control of the Minyan Industrial district, most of the Dahiyat Al-Assad district and half of the Minyan residential district. The frontline had stabilized and settled into a stalemate. Since the start of the offensive, the rebels had used 12 suicide car bombers in their attacks.

On 3 November, the rebels launched the second phase of their offensive, with a triple suicide-bombing against Army positions in the western part of the New Aleppo district and at the Minyan district, in an attempt to revitalize the operation since it had made little progress after the first day. They managed to advance and capture several positions. The rebels also assaulted the 3000 Housing Project and the Al-Assad Military Academy. During the clashes, another rebel tank was destroyed, as well as two Army anti-tank positions. Still, the rebels were not able to break into New Aleppo and their assault was repelled.

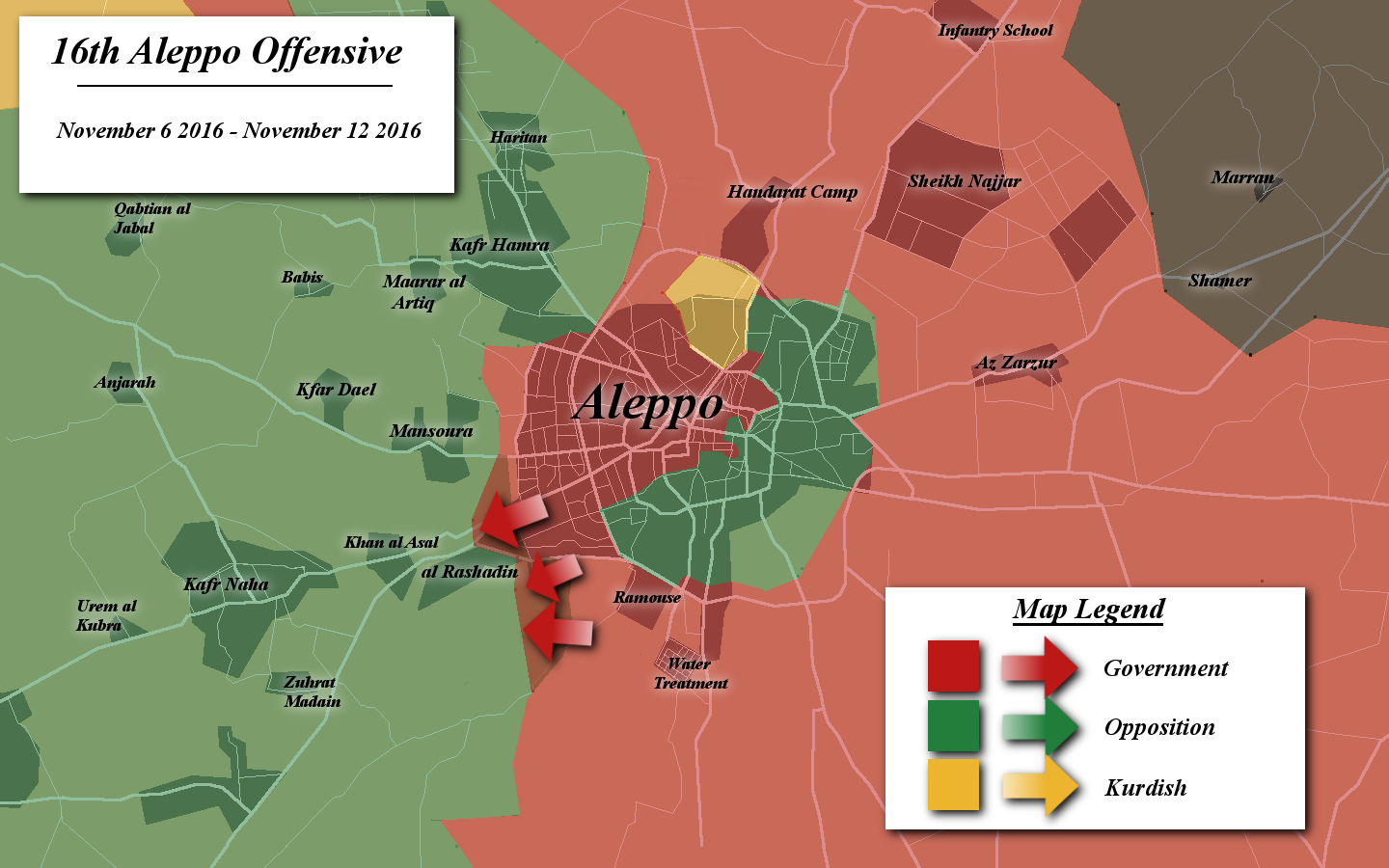
Map of the government counteroffensive

On 6 November, Army special forces and Hezbollah militiamen launched a counter-attack on the southwestern edge of Aleppo, advancing in the area of Al-Mutha hill and the 1070 Housing Project. The next day, government forces broke through the rebel's first line of defense on Tal Rakhem hill, making advances, while also seizing six buildings in the 1070 Housing Project. Later that day, government forces further advanced in the area and managed to impose fire control over the nearby al-Hikmah school.

On 8 November, government troops fully captured the 1070 Housing Project, as well as three nearby hills. The rebels additionally withdrew from al-Hikmah school, so to regroup at the Rashiddeen 5 Suburb, but the Army had not yet reached the school due to heavy rebel shelling. Later, government troops launched a large assault inside the Dahiyat Al-Assad and Minyan districts, recapturing Minyan and reportedly advancing inside Dahiyat Al-Assad. That night, the rebels managed to recapture the western half of Minyan. The next day, government troops seized the strategic Hikmah school and secured the Hikmah area, while they made their first push towards the Rashiddeen 5 and Aqrab districts in southwest Aleppo. Later, government troops made their first assault against the Rashiddeen 5 and Aqrab districts in southwest Aleppo.

On 10 November, government troops recaptured half of the Dahiyat Al-Assad district, including the Science Academy and nearby church. Violent clashes continued between government troops and the rebels in the western part of the district, around the Sourah and Shair checkpoints. The next day, the rebels recaptured all areas lost in Dahiyat Al-Assad, but a new Army attack on the district was soon under way and they once again regained several areas. In an attempt to stop the Army's counter-attack, the rebels sent reinforcements. Concurrently, government forces recaptured the entire Minyan residential district after breaking the rebel's last line of defense. The Army then continued with its assault, attacking the nearby Minyan Sawmills and Carton Factory, and seized the factory. Fighting continued at the sawmills and the Tires Barracks. Later that evening, the Army retook control of Dahiyat Al-Assad district.

On 12 November, the Army attacked and captured the Sourah checkpoint, west of Dahiyat Al-Assad, turning their attention then to the northern perimeter of the Souq Al-Jabas area. They also fully secured the Minyan industrial district after recapturing the Minyan Sawmills. By this point, government forces had regained control of all areas lost at the start of the rebel offensive, as well as areas lost in the earlier rebel offensive during the summer campaign.

== Aftermath ==
Following the successful campaign by pro-government forces, the rebels in eastern-Aleppo were given 24 hours to surrender before the Army started an offensive to completely recapture the rebel-held districts in the east.

After the offensive, food and medicine were reportedly smuggled from the YPG-held Sheikh Maqsood into rebel-held eastern Aleppo.

== International reactions ==
Amnesty International stated that the "armed opposition groups have displayed a shocking disregard for civilian lives", deploying weapons "whose use in the vicinity of densely populated civilian areas flagrantly violates international humanitarian law". The organization called the rebel groups to "end all attacks that fail to distinguish between military targets and civilians".

The United Nations special envoy for Syria, Staffan de Mistura, expressed that he was "appalled and shocked" by the attacks targeting civilians in Aleppo. He later stated that some rebel groups had been preventing civilians leaving eastern Aleppo.
