= Aleppo offensive (August–September 2016) =

Syrian Army counter-offensive

- Part of the 2016 Aleppo summer campaign, Battle of Aleppo and the Syrian Civil War
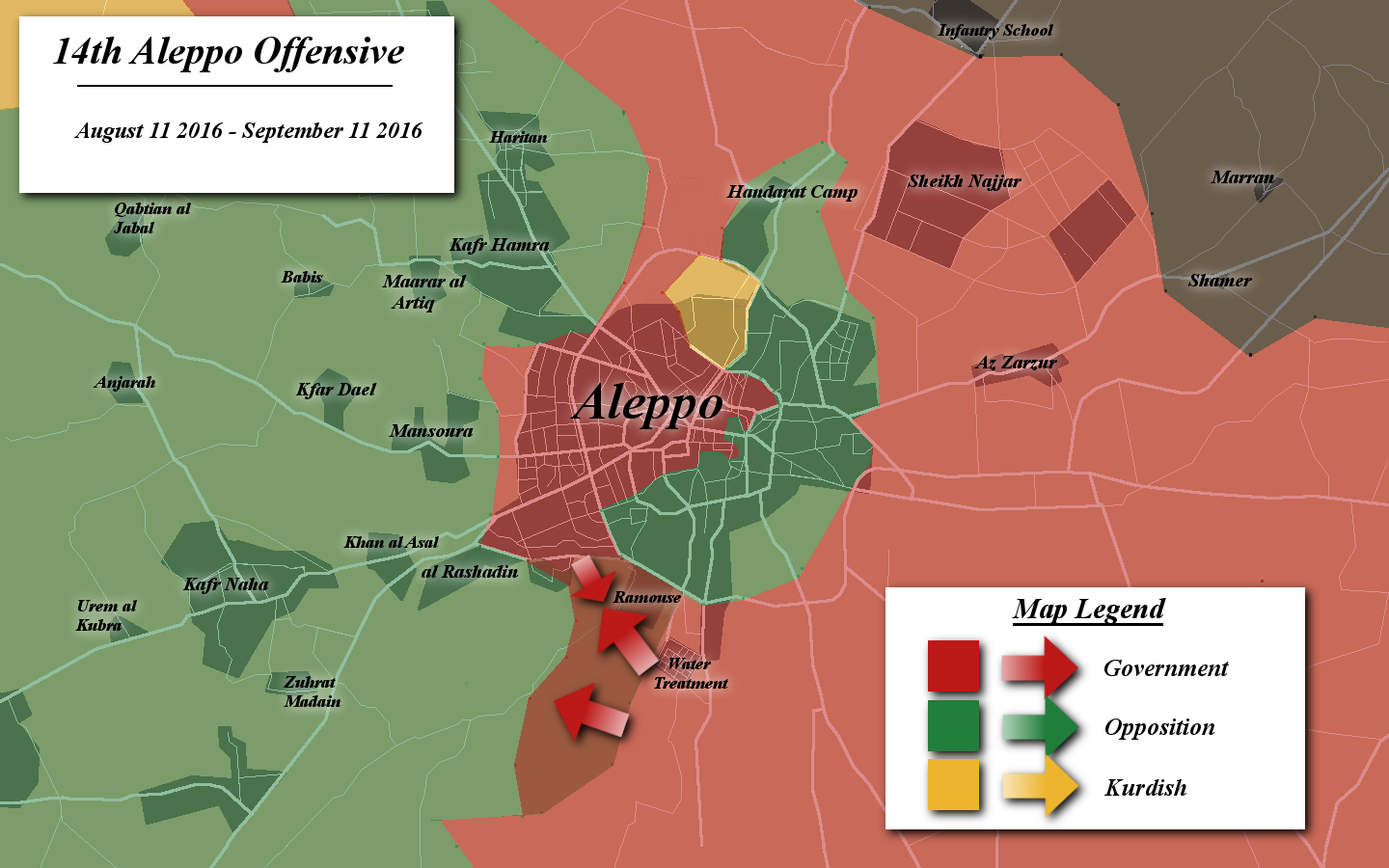
- Map of the offensive
Date	11 August – 11 September 2016 (1 month)
Location	Aleppo, Syria
Result	Syrian Army and allies victory: Army recaptures the Ramouseh Military Base, parts of the Ramouseh district and several hills and villages, once again besieging rebel-held eastern Aleppo

Belligerents
(Syria) Syrian Arab Republic: Syrian Armed Forces; National Defense Force; Liwa al-Quds; Ba'ath Brigades; Hezbollah; Airstrikes: Russia: Aerospace Forces	Fatah Halab; Jabhat Fatah al-Sham; Ahrar al-Sham

The Aleppo offensive (August–September 2016) was a Syrian Army counter-offensive launched on the southern outskirts of Aleppo in mid-September 2016. The aim of the offensive was to recapture territory lost due to a rebel offensive earlier in August and besiege the rebel-held part of Aleppo once again.

== The offensive ==
=== Fighting at the 1070 Housing Project ===
Between 11 and 17 August, the Army launched several counter-attacks, primarily against the 1070 Housing Project. During the fighting on 11 August, 29 government and up to 20 rebel fighters were killed. By 17 August, government forces recaptured about 70 percent of the district.

Early on 14 August, a large rebel attack was launched against the Army-held cement plant, in an attempt to enlarge the four kilometer wide rebel supply line. The assault was repelled after heavy fighting for more than a day, with 35 rebels and 17 soldiers being killed. On the evening of 15 August, the Army and Hezbollah launched a new counterattack at the 1070 Al-Hamdaniyah Housing Project, and by the next morning finally broke through the first rebel defense line, reportedly securing around 80% of the district.

=== Battle for the Military Academy ===
On 17 August, after capturing most of the 1070 Al-Hamdaniyah Housing Project, government forces also stormed the Air Force Technical Base of the Al-Assad Military Academy. The former government commander of the base Brig. Gen. Deeb Bazi was killed as he led the assault. Unable to fortify their position in the Air Force Base, the government forces eventually retreated as the rebels launched a counter-attack. The next day, government forces captured the villages of Al-Qarassi, Tal Sanourabat and Al-‘Amariyah in the southern Aleppo countryside. Later that day, however, the rebel forces managed to regain all three villages.

On 19 August, Republican Guard reinforcements from Damascus arrived in Aleppo for a new assault against the Aleppo Artillery Academy, which began later that day. Meanwhile, government forces, supported by the IRGC and Shia militias, also launched another attack to capture Al-Qarassi, which was considered as the gateway to the strategically significant town of Khan Tuman. In the following night, government forces seized Tal Al-Aqra and thereby cut the Aleppo Artillery Academy's rebel defenders off from their main force. On 20 August, pro-government fighters stormed Al-Qarassi once again.

On 21 August, government forces captured Umm Qara hill that overlooks the Khan Touman-Ramouseh Road near Al-Qarassi, as well as SyriaTel hill. Between 21 and 24 August, the rebels launched four counterattacks in an attempt to recapture Umm Qara hill, with all attacks eventually being repelled. Both sides suffered heavy casualties during the fighting, but the rebel's losses were far greater.

On 22 August, the pro-government forces continued their offensive, taking control of the Al-Ramouseh Roundabout and Bridge, and later on storming the Aleppo Artillery Academy, resulting in a fierce battle with the rebel defenders. Eventually, government troops were pushed back from the Academy. Between 23 and 27 August, the pro-government forces launched several attacks on both the Aleppo Technical College and the 1070 Housing Project; no progress was made at the latter, though government forces managed to gain a foothold inside the college. As the pro-government forces failed to make further advances at the Technical College, they instead concentrated on the nearby, strategically important hill of Tal Sanourbat. The Syrian Army and Hezbollah consequently captured the hill on 30 August, while a Tiger Forces-led attack succeeded in capturing the hilltops of Tal Qarassi, Tal ‘Amarah, Barandeh and Qarassi village. Furthermore, over 120 Russian Naval Infantry soldiers arrived on that day with BMPs in Aleppo, coming as military advisors for the government forces from Latakia.

On 1 September, pro-government forces stormed the Armament School, resulting in an extremely fierce battle that resulted in heavy casualties for both rebel defenders as well as the government attackers. After three days of fighting, the Tiger Forces, Liwa al-Quds, Hezbollah attacked the Armament School from the north, while Syrian Army units launched simultaneous assault from the south, finally overwhelming the defenders and capturing the whole complex. Thus, government troops reestablished the siege of rebel-held areas of Aleppo.

=== Rebel lines collapse ===
On 5 September, rebel frontlines in southern Aleppo collapsed, with pro-government forces overrunning three villages, three hills, two factories, two storage facilities, an Air Defense Base and a quarry. The rebels had also reportedly retreated from the 1070 projects and the Al-Hikma school. However, later, it was reported fighting continued at the 1070 projects, where there were contradictory reports who held most of the district.

On 6 September, pro-government forces attacked the Ramouseh district, reportedly capturing the Ramouseh Oven and Al-Dabaghat Plant. They also conducted an assault near the town of Khan Touman, capturing the Khan Touman Ammunition depots and some points in outskirts of the town. Over the next two days, the Syrian Army captured the whole Ramouseh district, reopening the Ramouseh Road to supply government-held western Aleppo by 9 September. Meanwhile, an air strike was conducted on a high-level meeting of Army of Conquest top commanders near Aleppo, killing several Jabhat Fateh al-Sham leaders, most prominently Abu Hajer Al-Homsi, chief military commander of the group. The rebels initially accused the United States of conducting the strike, but this was denied by the Pentagon and subsequently Russia took responsibility.

On 10–11 September, the Syrian Army and its allies continued to advance in the 1070 Al-Hamdaniyah Housing Project and the Al-‘Amariyah District. They also continued to target the Hikmah School.

On 11 September, airstrikes interrupted Eid al-Adha celebrations in rebel-held areas of Aleppo and Idlib. US and Russian officials negotiated ceasefire hours prior, which was to go into effect later the following day at sundown.

== See also ==
- Northern Aleppo offensive (February 2016)
- 2016 Southern Aleppo campaign
- Aleppo offensive (June–July 2016)
- Aleppo offensive (July–August 2016)
- Aleppo offensive (September–October 2016)
