= Aleppo offensive (July–August 2016) =

Part of the Syrian Civil War

- Part of 2016 Aleppo summer campaign, the Battle of Aleppo and the Syrian Civil War
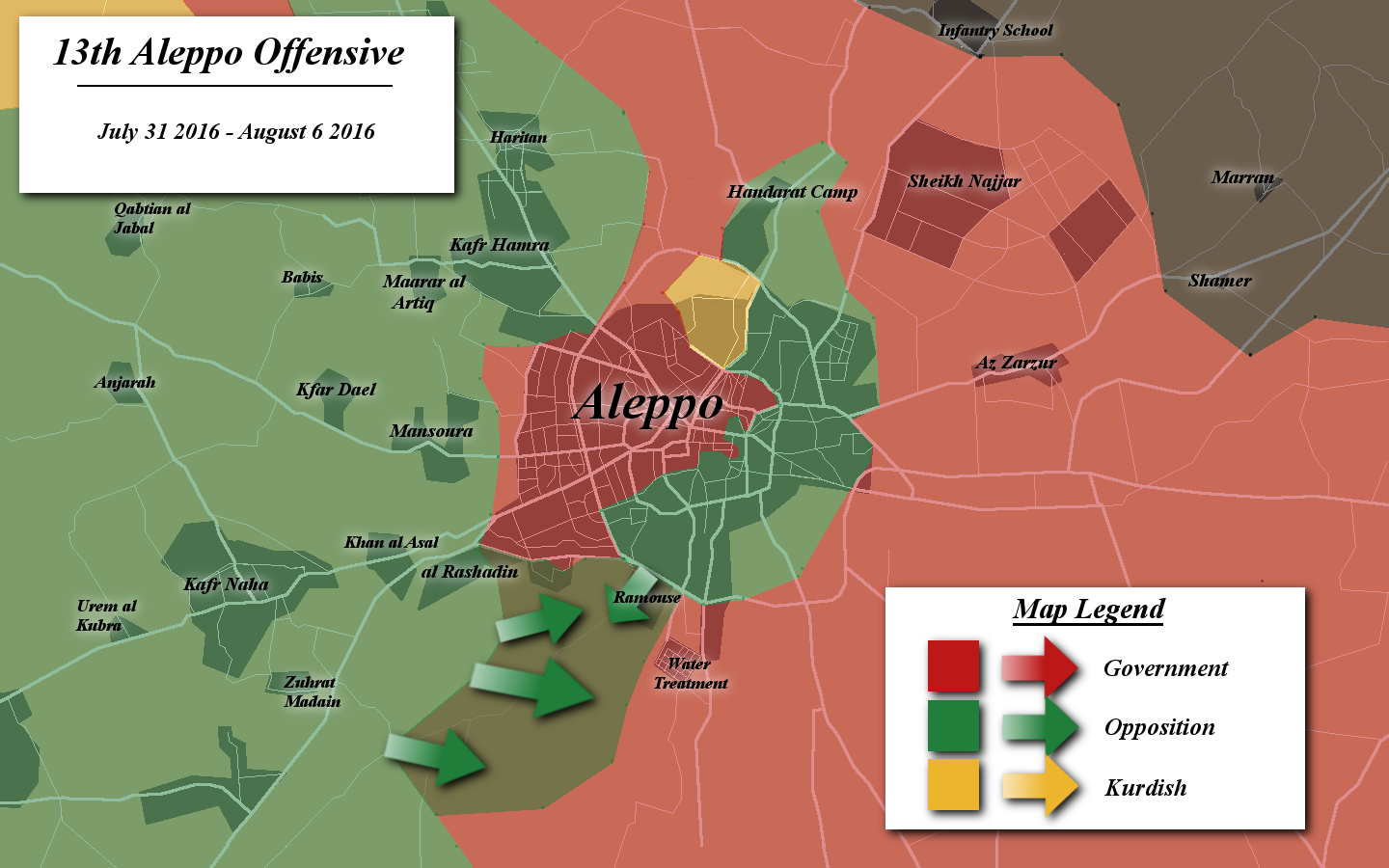
- Battle map of Aleppo during August 2016
Date	31 July – 6 August 2016 (6 days)
Location	Aleppo, Syria
Result	Major rebel victory; Government counter-offensive: Rebels capture the Artillery Academy and Ramouseh district; Rebels open a new unsecured corridor via the Ramouseh district; Army uses the Castello Road as an alternative route to supply its troops in west Aleppo city

Belligerents
Fatah Halab; Army of Conquest: Al-Nusra Front; Ahrar al-Sham; Turkistan Islamic Party in Syria; Jaysh al-Sunna; Ajnad al-Sham; Ansar al-Islam Malhama Tactical Supported by: Turkey	Syrian Arab Republic: Syrian Arab Armed Forces; Iran; Allied militias: Liwa al-Quds; Ba'ath Brigades; Hezbollah; Liwa Fatemiyoun; Harakat Hezbollah al-Nujaba; Syrian Resistance; Airstrikes: Russia: Aerospace Forces

Commanders and leaders
Maj. Yasser Abd al-Rahim (official leader of Fatah Halab); Ahmad Al-Hayek † (Jaysh al-Islam commander); Kamal Ahmad † (8th Brigade commander); Hammoud Al-Barm † (Army of Mujahideen commander); Abdullah al-Muhaysini (Jabhat Fateh cleric and leader); Abu Al-Muthanna † ("Inghimassiyeen" commander); Mohammad Al-Haj Abboud † (Jabhat Fateh field commander); Abdel Qader Na’asani † (Jabhat Fateh commander); Mohammad Hassan Al-Khatib † (Jabhat Fateh commander); Haytham Al-Darwish † (Jabhat Fateh commander); Abu Mohammad Al-Sari † (Ahrar al-Sham top commander); Hossam Abu Bakr (Ahrar al-Sham commander); Abu Hamza Al-Shami † (5th Brigade commander); Ali Hamam † (Ajnad al-Sham top commander); Wa’el Diyab (WIA) (Ajnad al-Sham commander) Mustafa Abu Jumaa † (Levant Front and Leon Sedov Brigade commander)	Fahd Jassem al-Freij (Minister of Defense); Maj. Gen. Adib Mohammed (Head of Aleppo security committee, replaced); Maj. Gen. Zaid Saleh (Replacement head of Aleppo security committee); Brig. Gen. Deeb Bazi (Aleppo military academy commander); Gen. Yasir Muhsin Miya † (Syrian Army commander); Gen. Muhammad Ali Sharbo † (Syrian Army commander); Maj. Abolghassem Zahiri (WIA) (102nd Imam Hossein Battalion commander); Unknown Liwa Fatemiyoun commander †

Units involved
Fatah Halab: Harakat Nour al-Din al-Zenki; Sham Legion; Jaysh al-Islam; Levant Front; Leon Sedov Brigade; 8th Brigade; Free Syrian Army; Fastaqim Kama Umirt; Army of Mujahideen; 16th Division; Mountain Hawks Brigade; 13th Division; Northern Division; 101st Infantry Division; 1st Regiment; Central Division; Authenticity and Development Front; Thuwar al-Sham Battalion; Ahrar al-Sham: Abu Amara Brigades; 5th Brigade; al-Nusra Front / Jabhat Fateh al-Sham: "Inghimassiyeen" elite shock troops; Katibat al Tawhid wal Jihad; Jabhat Ansar al-Din	Syrian Army: 4th Mechanized Division; Republican Guard; National Defense Force; Syrian Arab Air Force; Islamic Republic of Iran Army: Islamic Revolutionary Guard Corps; Isfahan Corps; 102nd Imam Hossein Battalion; Alborz Corps; Basij; Iranian Army; Hezbollah units: Imam Mahdi Brigade; Radwan Forces

Strength
8,000–10,000+ fighters	Unknown number of soldiers, 100+ tanks, 400+ BMPs

Casualties and losses
500 killed (SOHR claim); 469 killed (The Inside Source) 800+ killed (pro-government claim)	200 killed (SOHR claim) 224 killed (The Inside Source)
- 130 civilians killed

The Aleppo offensive (July–August 2016) refers to a military operation launched on the southern outskirts of Aleppo at the end of July 2016 by rebel forces in Syria. The aim of the offensive was to establish a new supply line into Aleppo city, after a previous Army offensive had cut off all rebel access to Aleppo.

== The offensive ==
=== Initial rebel attack ===
On 31 July, the Army of Conquest launched a counter-offensive both south and north of Aleppo in an attempt to lift the siege on the rebel-held areas of the city. Fierce fighting was reported at the Al-Castillo Highway, while the rebels managed to capture the Al-Hikma school and two hills on the southern outskirts of Aleppo, which constituted an advanced Army defense line, after two rebel suicide car-bombers attacked government positions in the Rashidin neighborhood. The suicide bombings largely destroyed the former school. The wide-scale rebel offensive reportedly included 8,000–10,000 fighters, 95 tanks, hundreds of rocket launchers and a large number of suicide-bombers. By evening, the rebels also took control of Al-'Amariyah village and reached the nearby 1070 Al-Hamadaniyah Housing Project where fighting continued. At this point, the Russian Air Force started to conduct heavy air-strikes in an attempt to push back the rebel offensive. During the night, the 1070 Al-Hamadaniyah Housing Project was also taken by the rebels. The fighting then shifted to the Al-Assad Military Academy.

The next morning, government reinforcements arrived at the Al-Assad Military Academy, after which the Army started a counter-attack and reportedly managed to cut the road between the Al-Hikma school and the 1070 Housing Project, leaving the rebels besieged at the Housing area. An assault on the 1070 Housing Project then started. However, later in the day, the rebels once again advanced and took control of Mushrifah village (also known as Sharfa), that is situated on a hill that overlooks the Military Academy. Later that evening, a new Army counter-attack was launched, and the military managed to recapture the 1070 Housing Project neighborhood, one hill, and a factory. Elsewhere, the Army backed by intense Russian Air Force bombardment launched a large assault on the Handarat Camp. Some speculated that the potential government capture of the Handarat Camp would create a new supply route to west Aleppo's neighborhoods. Meanwhile, Kurdish forces reportedly rejected an offer by some government soldiers for Kurdish fighters to leave the YPG-controlled part of Aleppo.

=== Army counter-offensive and rebel offensive on Ramouseh and artillery school ===
On 2 August, the Army continued with its push to regain ground and managed to retake several more positions in the vicinity of the 1070 Housing Project, as well as Al-'Amariyah village and two more hills. Still, later in the day, the rebels launched an assault on the Ramouseh district, with two rebel tunnel bombs detonating under buildings that were used as barracks by government forces. Subsequently, rebels inside Aleppo made an advance into Ramouseh, attempting to flank the Military Academy. Further to the south, the rebels also took control of the village of Huwayz and a hill at Al-'Amariyah. At the same time, on the western edge of Aleppo, the rebels seized the Minyan Sawmills area. However, this turned out to be a trap when the Army called in four precise Russian air-strikes on the complex, killing 38 rebels and forcing them to withdraw. Meanwhile, the rebel assault on Ramouseh was slowed due to heavy Russian air-strikes, despite the rebels holding overlooking positions. The attack on Ramouseh was eventually repelled with minimal rebel gains, that were recaptured, and the Army managed to retake Huwayz and the surrounding hills. While the heavy fighting on the southwestern edge of Aleppo continued, government forces reportedly secured 30 percent of the Handarat Camp in the northeast of Aleppo during the day. In the course of the day's fighting, rebel forces suffered heavy casualties with several commanders killed. There were also pro-government claims that rebels had used chemical weapons during their attacks. The rebels were reportedly irritated by the lack of progress at the 1070 complex, Military Academy, Sawmill and Ramouseh and were preparing a fourth assault against government lines that would include more suicide car-bombers.

By 3 August, the Army counter-attack had recaptured 5 out of 8 positions that were lost since the start of the rebel offensive, including the two villages and two hilltops. The rebels were still in control of one village and four hilltops. By this point, rebel commanders reportedly decided to abandon their pre-planned six-stage offensive to review future military maneuvers in the region, with plans being made for the next attack wave.

On 4 August, the fourth rebel assault was launched, targeting Ramouseh and Al-'Amariyah. The rebels once again seized Al-'Amariyah and its nearby hill, or at least a part of it. Meanwhile, the Army was still trying to fully recapture the 1070 Housing Project and retake the Al-Hikma school with the support of Russian air-strikes.

On 5 August, the Army recaptured all of the points they lost the previous day, including Al-'Amariyah. Later, a rebel attack on the Military Academy started, with two suicide car-bombers attacking government positions. The suicide bombings, combined with heavy artillery fire, caused confusion among government forces, creating an opportunity for the rebels to enter the base and capture a part of it. However, heavy air-strikes managed to provide the Army enough time to regroup, push the rebels out of the base and repel the attack. Still, a breach on the southern end of the Military Academy still existed. Meanwhile, government troops managed to take the Steel Factory after clashes with rebels at the Handarat Camp.

=== Rebel assault on artillery base, breaking the siege ===
On 6 August, after a new attack, the rebels took control of the Armament school and most of the Artillery school, and thus more than half of the Military Academy. The Artillery school had been used as an artillery base. Fighting continued at the Air Technical school, with the rebels eventually being repelled. Shortly after their advances at the Military Academy, rebels both inside and outside Aleppo advanced into the Ramouseh neighborhood, linked up and captured it. With this advance, the rebels managed to cut the government's supply line into the government-held part of west Aleppo and announced the Army's siege of rebel-held east Aleppo had been broken. However, the new rebel supply line was still under Army artillery fire and being hit by air-strikes, making both sides essentially under siege. Since the rebel offensive started, at least 130 civilians had been killed, most by rebel shelling of government-held districts. 500 fighters on both sides also died, mostly rebels. At the end of the day, the rebels were in control of the entire Military Academy base, after taking the Air Technical school, and the Ramouseh district, while the Army still held the Cement Factory and parts of the military housing. The rebels captured a number of armored vehicles and an undisclosed amount of ammunition during the capture of the military academy, as shown on footage on the next day. Fatah Halab issued a statement in which it promised amnesty for those who remained at home, in a mosque or church, or who put down their weapons.

== Aftermath – New siege ==
The siege of eastern Aleppo resumed when government forces re-took the Military Academy on 4 September.

== See also ==
- East Aleppo offensive (2015–16)
- Northern Aleppo offensive (February 2016)
- Northern Aleppo offensive (March–June 2016)
- 2016 Khanasir offensive
- 2016 Southern Aleppo campaign
