= 2016 Aleppo summer campaign =

Campaign

- Part of the Battle of Aleppo and the Syrian Civil War
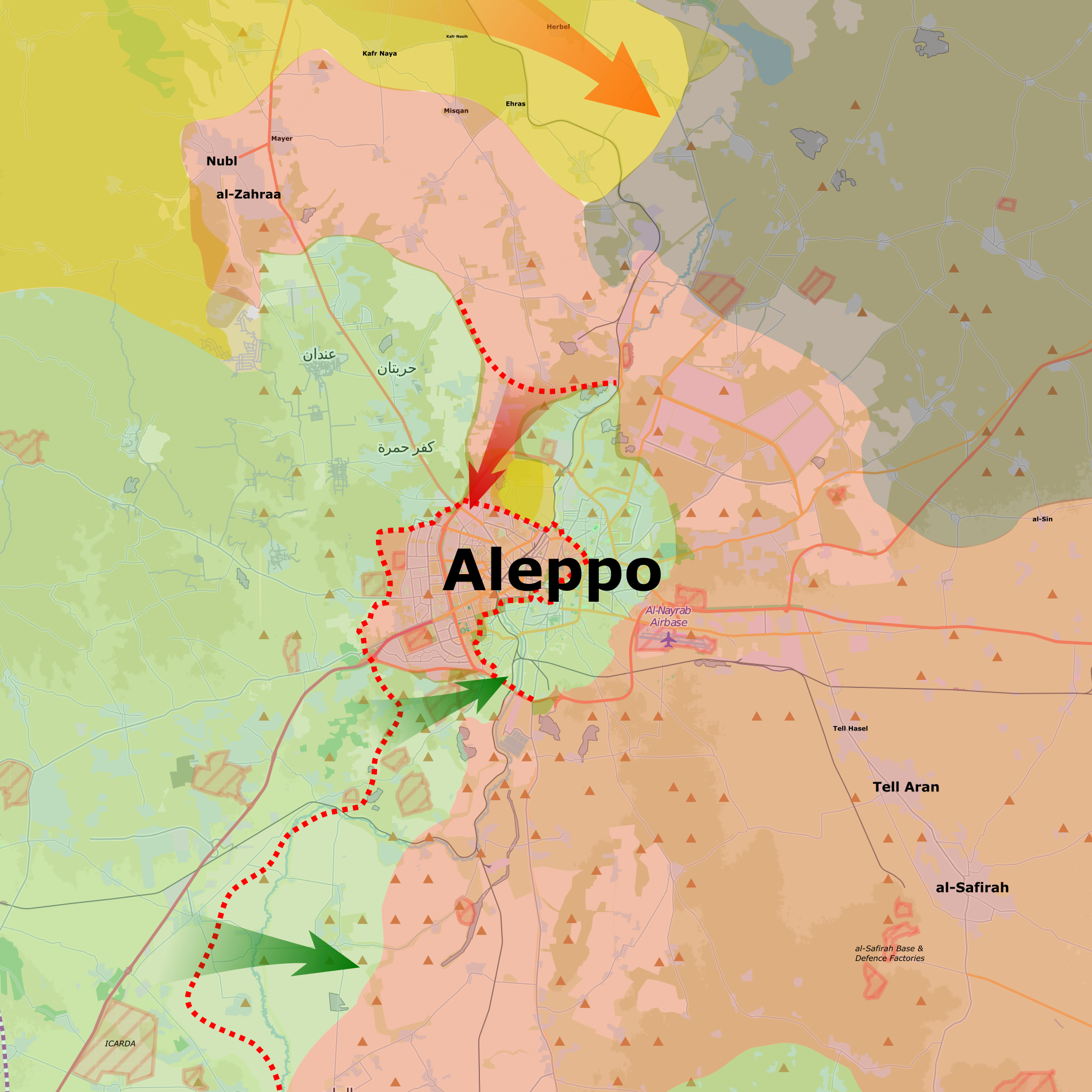
- Map of Northern Syria during the offensive, with the area shown within the Aleppo City map marked by the box. Syrian Army control Syrian Opposition control SDF control Islamic State of Iraq and the Levant control
Date	25 June 2016 – 11 September 2016 (2 months, 2 weeks and 3 days)
Location	Aleppo, Syria
Result	Syrian Army and allies victory: Army captures Castello road, besieging rebel-held areas of Aleppo; Army captures the al-Layramoun, Bani Zeid and Ashrafiyah districts, and advances in the al-Khalidiyah district; Rebel counter-offensive opens a new unsecured corridor by capturing the Artillery College and Ramouseh district, which is later recaptured by the Army, with rebel-held eastern Aleppo once again besieged

Belligerents
Syrian Arab Republic; Iran; Liwa al-Quds; Ba'ath Brigades; Hezbollah; Liwa Fatemiyoun (Iraq) Harakat Hezbollah al-Nujaba; Syrian Resistance; Supported by: Russia (Airstrikes) Autonomous Administration of North and East Syria	Fatah Halab; Army of Conquest; Al-Nusra Front (Jabhat Fateh al-Sham since 28 July); Ahrar al-Sham; Turkistan Islamic Party in Syria; Jaysh al-Sunna; Ajnad al-Sham; Ansar al-Islam; Supported by: Turkey

Commanders and leaders
(Syria) Fahd Jassem al-Freij (Minister of Defense); Maj. Gen. Suhayl al-Hasan (Tiger Forces chief commander); Maj. Gen. Adib Mohammed (Head of Aleppo security committee, replaced); Maj. Gen. Zaid Saleh (Replacement head of Aleppo security committee); Maj. Gen. Adib Salameh (Head of Aleppo Air Force Intelligence Directorate branch); Brig. Gen. Deeb Bazi † (Airforce Technical Base commander); Brig. Gen. Asif Kheir Bek (DOW) (Artillery School commander); Gen. Yasir Muhsin Miya † (Syrian Army commander); Gen. Muhammad Ali Sharbo † (Syrian Army commander); Maj. Gen. Mahmoud Hassan (DOW) (147th Regiment Chief of Staff); Maj. Duraid Abu 'Ammar (Tiger Forces commander); Suleiman al-Shwakh (Desert Commandos commander); Mudar Makhlouf (Military Security Shield Forces commander); Maj. Gen. Qasem Soleimani (Quds Force chief commander); Gen. Dariush Darsti † (IRGC commander); Maj. Abolghassem Zahiri (WIA) (102nd Imam Hossein Battalion commander); Ahmad Gholami † (Iranian paramilitary commander); Haj Sameer Ali Awada † (Hezbollah top commander, alleged); Hassan Mousa Abdul Nabi † (Hezbollah commander); Ali Muhammad Mustafa Khalil † (Imam Hujja Regiment commander) Zoran Birhat (YPJ senior commander); Sharvan Efrin (YPG commander); Unknown YPG commander †	Maj. Yasser Abd al-Rahim (official leader of Fatah Halab); Ammar Shaaban † (Harakat Nour al-Din al-Zenki top commander); Col. Mohammad Bakkar † (Sham Legion top commander); Kamal Ahmad † (8th Brigade commander); Abdel-Rahman Mansour † (Islamic Safwah Movement commander); Yusuf Zo'ah † (Army of Mujahideen general commander) (Army of Mujahideen commander); Abu Hajer Al-Homsi † (nom de guerre: Abu Omar Saraqib, Army of Conquest commander of Idlib province and Jabhat Fatah chief military commander); Abdullah al-Muhaysini (Jabhat Fateh cleric and leader); Abu Al-Muthanna † ("Inghimassiyeen" commander); Khaled Abu Anas (Ahrar al-Sham senior commander); Mustafa Al-Bayyour † (Ahrar al-Sham top commander); Khattab Abou Ahmad † (Abu Amara Brigades chief commander); Abu Hamza Al-Shami † (5th Brigade commander); Saif Allah † (Ahrar al-Sham tank commander); Ali Hamam † (Ajnad al-Sham top commander); Wa’el Diyab (WIA) (Ajnad al-Sham commander); Abu Leith al-Tunisi † (Ansar al-Islam commander); Mustafa Abu Jumaa † (Levant Front and Leon Sedov Brigade commander)

Units involved
Syrian Armed Forces; Syrian Army; 4th Mechanized Division; Republican Guard; 102nd Brigade; 800th Regiment; Popular Security and Support Forces; Tiger Forces; National Defence Forces; Military Intelligence Directorate; Desert Commandos Regiment; Forces of the Fighters of the Tribes; Military Security Shield Forces; Syrian Arab Air Force; Iranian Armed Forces; Islamic Revolutionary Guard Corps; Isfahan division; 102nd Imam Hossein Battalion; Alborz division; Basij; Iranian Army; Unidentified Iranian paramilitary unit; Hezbollah military; Radwan Forces; Syrian Hezbollah groups; Imam Mahdi Brigade; National Ideological Resistance; Imam Hujja Regiment; Russian Armed Forces; Aerospace Forces; Naval Infantry advisors; Syrian Democratic Forces (27–30 July; 12–17 August); People's Protection Units; Women's Protection Units	Fatah Halab; Harakat Nour al-Din al-Zenki; Sham Legion; Jaysh al-Islam; 8th Brigade; Free Syrian Army; Fastaqim Kama Umirt; Army of Victory; Army of Mujahideen; 16th Division; Mountain Hawks Brigade; 13th Division; Northern Division; 101st Infantry Division; 1st Regiment; Central Division; Authenticity and Development Front; Levant Front; Levant Revolutionaries Battalions; Leon Sedov Brigade; Ahrar al-Sham; Abu Amara Brigades; 5th Brigade; Al-Nusra Front / Jabhat Fateh al-Sham; Inghimassiyeen elite shock troops; Katibat al Tawhid wal Jihad; Jabhat Ansar al-Din; Nusra Brigades

Strength
Unknown number of soldiers, 100+ tanks, 400+ BMPs: 400 Military Security Shield Forces fighters; c. 2,000 al-Nujaba fighters (Russia) 120+ Naval Infantry advisors, several BMPs	8,000–10,000+ fighters: 2,500+ Jabhat Fateh fighters; 500 TIP fighters and 60 suicide attackers

Casualties and losses
688 killed (per The Inside Source; since 31 July); 625 killed (per SOHR; 31 July – 10 Sep.)	1,051 killed (per The Inside Source; since 31 July); 948 killed (per SOHR; 31 July – 10 Sep.)
- 718 civilians killed (31 July – 10 Sep.)

The 2016 Aleppo summer campaign started with a military operation launched on the northern outskirts of Aleppo in late June 2016, by the Syrian Arab Army. The aim of the offensive was to cut the last rebel supply line into Aleppo city.

By late July, the military had managed to sever the last rebel supply line coming from the north and completely surround Aleppo. However, within days, the rebels launched a large-scale counter-attack south of Aleppo in an attempt to both open a new supply line into rebel-held parts of the city and cut-off the government-held side. The whole campaign, including both the Army's offensive and subsequent rebel counter-offensive, was seen by both sides as possibly deciding the fate of the entire war.

The battle was also notable for the large loss of top rebel field commanders, with about three dozen being killed.

By early September, Syrian government troops had cemented their siege of the rebel part of the city.

== The campaign ==
=== Army advances, rebel-held Aleppo surrounded ===
The offensive began on 25 June, with heavy Russian air-strikes and ground bombardment. On 26 June, the military made advances into the Mallah Farms, and by 28 June, they had captured half of the farmlands, including the Al-Asamat and Arab Salum areas. The advances brought the Castello Road within firing range of the military's artillery.

After midnight on 7 July, amid heavy airstrikes, pro-government forces captured the southern part of Mallah and came within one kilometer of the Castello Road. They captured a mosque complex and a hill which overlooks the Castello Road, thus enabling them to bring the road under artillery fire-control. This effectively cut off the only supply route to the rebel-held part of Aleppo.

Several days later, the Army advanced in the al-Layramoun al-Khalidiyah and Bani Zeid districts. During this time, government troops captured the Sadkop Gas Factory.

By the evening of 13 July, the military secured the whole al-Khalidiyah district and most of the al-Layramoun industrial area, after capturing the last several rebel-held buildings in al-Khalidiyah, as well as al-Layramoun's gas factory, market and glass factory.

On 17 July, the Army and Hezbollah reached the Castello Road, capturing parts of it and completely cutting it after taking control of Castello Hill. With this advance, the rebel-held part of Aleppo city was fully besieged and the al-Layramoun roundabout came under artillery fire-control. Meanwhile, the military made more advances in the Bani Zeid and al-Layramoun areas, capturing most of the factories.

Between 23 and 25 July, the Army expanded its control in the al-Layramoun industrial area by capturing the Textile Factory a dozen industrial buildings and two malls. Late on 25 July, the Tiger Forces captured two sites in and near the Castillo Complex, threatening to cut off the rebels remaining at Bani Zeid and al-Layramoun.

On 26 July, government forces captured all of the al-Layramoun District after heavy fighting for the last rebel stronghold there, the Bus Station. After also seizing the Al-Castillo Amusement Park and imposing fire control over Bani Zeid, the remaining rebel forces in Aleppo City were left almost completely besieged.

On 27 July, rebel forces attacked the Kurdish-held areas of Aleppo, although their attack was repelled. The Kurds then proceeded to advance into the nearby rebel-held Bani Zeid Youth Housing neighborhood and captured the whole complex. Later that day, the Army officially declared it had cut off all rebel supply routes into Aleppo. On 28 July, the military captured the Bani Zeid district, as well as the rebel-held parts of the Ashrafiyah district. The rebels withdrew from Bani Zeid before the main Army assault so to avoid heavy losses. The Army then continued to push its assault towards the Dahret Abdrubbah area.

On 30 July, the Kurdish YPG captured the Shuqayyif Youth Housing area, next to the Castello Road.

=== Rebel counter-offensive, both sides besieged ===
On 31 July, the Army of Conquest launched a counter-offensive both south and north of Aleppo in an attempt to lift the siege on the rebel-held areas of the city. Fierce fighting was reported at the Al-Castillo Highway, while the rebels managed to capture the Al-Hikma school and two hills on the southern outskirts of Aleppo, which constituted an advanced Army defense line. The wide-scale rebel counter-attack reportedly included 8,000–10,000 fighters, 95 tanks, hundreds of rocket launchers and a large number of suicide-bombers. By evening, the rebels also took control of Al-'Amariyah village and reached the nearby 1070 Al-Hamadaniyah Housing Project where fighting continued. During the night, the 1070 Al-Hamadaniyah Housing Project was also taken by the rebels.

The next day, the rebels once again advanced and took control of Mushrifah village (also known as Sharfa), that is situated on a hill that overlooks the Al-Assad Military Academy.

Over the next several days, back-and-forth fighting took place for control of the 1070 Housing Project neighborhood, Huwayz village, Al-'Amariyah and several hills.

On 5 August, a rebel attack on the Military Academy started Shortly after their advances at the Military Academy, rebels both inside and outside Aleppo advanced into the Ramouseh neighborhood, linked up and captured it. With this advance, the rebels managed to cut the government's supply line into the government-held part of west Aleppo and announced the Army's siege of rebel-held east Aleppo had been broken. Since the rebel offensive started, at least 130 civilians had been killed, most by rebel shelling of government-held districts. 500 fighters on both sides also died, mostly rebels. At the end of the day, the rebels were in control of the entire Military Academy base and the Ramouseh district.

=== Fighting continues, Army retakes territory ===
On 7 August, fighting was still continuing in the Ramouseh district, where it was confirmed the Army was still in control of parts of the area. The government, backed by Russia, launched an intensive air-strike campaign, in which one of the military schools captured by the rebels was reportedly leveled. Meanwhile, the rebels were putting up a "massive" defense to protect the new corridor. The next day, the Ramouseh district was confirmed to be completely under rebel control, while the Army recaptured al-Sanobrat hill.

On 11 August, the rebels attacked the government supply route to Aleppo between Khanasir and Ithriya, capturing Mahmyat Al-Ghazal. However, the Army recaptured the village the following day.

Between 11 and 17 August, the Army launched several counter-attacks, primarily against the 1070 Housing Project. During the fighting on 11 August, 29 government fighters and up to 20 rebel fighters were killed. By 17 August, government forces recaptured about 70 percent of the district.

On 17 August, after capturing most of the 1070 Al-Hamdaniyah Housing Project, government forces also stormed the Air Force Technical Base. The former government commander of the base Brig. Gen. Deeb Bazi was killed as he led the assault. Back-and-forth fighting at the Academy continued into early September, when on 4 September, pro-government forces finally overwhelmed the rebel defenders and captured the whole complex. Thus, government troops reestablished the siege of rebel-held areas of Aleppo.

Also during this time, on 21 August, government forces captured Umm Qara hill that overlooks the Khan Touman-Ramouseh Road near Al-Qarassi, as well as nearby SyriaTel hill. Multiple rebel counter-attacks in an attempt to recapture Umm Qara hill were eventually repelled.

On 5 September, rebel frontlines in southern Aleppo collapsed, with pro-government forces overrunning three villages, three hills, two factories, two storage facilities, an Air Defense Base and a quarry.

Between 6 and 8 September, the Syrian Army captured the whole Ramouseh district, reopening the Ramouseh Road to supply government-held western Aleppo by 9 September.

On 10–11 September, the Syrian Army and its allies continued to advance in the 1070 Al-Hamdaniyah Housing Project and the Al-'Amariyah District. They also continued to target the Hikmah School.

On 11 September, airstrikes interrupted Eid al-Adha celebrations in rebel-held areas of Aleppo and Idlib. US and Russian officials negotiated a ceasefire hours prior, which was to go into effect later the following day at sundown.

== Aftermath – Ceasefire and government assault on East Aleppo ==
After the implementation of the ceasefire in mid-September, the Syrian Army withdrew its forces from the Castello road to allow UN humanitarian aid into the eastern parts of the city. However, rebel groups outside the city did not allow humanitarian aid convoys into Aleppo. Later, as Russian Marines and Syrian Red Crescent personnel controlling Castello road came under fire by rebel groups, the SAA redeployed its soldiers once again.

On 16 September, the Russian Air Force carried out numerous airstrikes around Aleppo for the first time since the ceasefire had been reached four days earlier. On 19 September, an aid convoy from the United Nations and the Syrian Arab Red Crescent consisting of more than 18 trucks was reportedly hit by air-to-surface missiles as they headed for eastern Aleppo from the town of Urum al-Kubra, killing 12 people and severely injuring several more. At the same time, Russia and Syria restarted heavy bombing raids on rebels in the city.

Early on 21 September, the Syrian Army seized most of Hikma Hill, thus being on the verge of recapturing Al-Hikma school and the 1070 Housing Project. However, later in the day, the rebels retook the positions they lost on the hill. Still, the Army managed to capture areas of the Ramouseh district that had been rebel-held since late 2012. Meanwhile, SOHR claimed that 3,000 Russian soldiers had arrived at Aleppo to support new government offensives in the area.

On 22 September, the Syrian Army launched a new offensive into the rebel-held eastern neighborhoods. Government forces also made further progress in southern Aleppo, capturing a few sites.

A new rebel attempt to break the siege starting in late October 2016, failed after two weeks of fighting, and consequently all major rebel positions in East Aleppo were overrun by pro-government and Kurdish forces by 13 December 2016.

== See also ==
- East Aleppo offensive (2015–16)
- Northern Aleppo offensive (February 2016)
- Northern Aleppo offensive (March–June 2016)
- Aleppo offensive (September–October 2016)
- Aleppo offensive (October–November 2016)
- Aleppo offensive (November–December 2016)
- 2016 Khanasir offensive
- 2016 Southern Aleppo campaign
- Western al-Bab offensive (2016)
