= Fatah Halab =

Joint operations room of rebel factions in the Syrian Civil War

Conquest of Aleppo
- فتح حلب; Fatah Halab
- Leader: Major Yasser Abdul Rahim
- Dates active: 26 April 2015 – 21 January 2017 (in the Aleppo Governorate, until 1 December 2016 within southeastern Aleppo)
- Headquarters: Aleppo, Syria (until 1 December 2016); Aleppo Governorate, Syria (from 1 December 2016)
- Active regions: Aleppo Governorate, Syria (from 1 December 2016 they are no longer active in the city centre)
- Size: 8,000+ (16 October 2016)
- Wars: Syrian Civil War; Battle of Aleppo; Aleppo offensive (July 2015); Aleppo offensive (October–December 2015); Northern Aleppo offensive (February 2016); 2016 Southern Aleppo campaign; Aleppo bombings (April–July 2016); 2016 Aleppo summer campaign; Aleppo offensive (June–July 2016); Aleppo offensive (July–August 2016); Aleppo offensive (August–September 2016); Aleppo offensive (September–October 2016); Aleppo offensive (October–November 2016); Aleppo offensive (November–December 2016); Rojava–Islamist conflict

Fatah Halab (Arabic: فتح حلب, romanized: Fataḥ Ḥalab, lit. 'Conquest of Aleppo'), or Aleppo Conquest, was a joint operations room of Syrian rebel factions operating in and around Aleppo, Syria. Succeeding the Aleppo Liberation operations room, its establishment was announced on 26 April 2015. It stated that its aim was to conquer Aleppo City from Syrian government forces.

In an October 2015 publication, the Washington D.C.–based Institute for the Study of War considered Aleppo Conquest as one of the "powerbrokers" in Aleppo Governorate, being both "anti-regime" and "anti-ISIS."

Since the inter-rebel conflicts, defections and mergers which started in December 2016, Fatah Halab had become largely defunct.

== Member groups ==
The operations room included both US-backed groups and Sunni Islamist groups. It included some groups which also participated in the Sunni Islamist Ansar Al-Sharia operations room, but not others, such as Al-Nusra Front. Previously Al-Nusra coordinated with other groups through the Aleppo Operations Room.

Fatah Halab was originally established by seven major Sunni Islamist groups on 26 April 2015:

The number of groups in Fatah Halab increased after its founding, and by 18 June 2015 there were 31 groups.

As of October 2016 there were around 8,000 fighters spread out over a myriad of groups of varying sized. The following were the largest groups that participate in the operations room.

- Ahrar al-Sham
  - Abu Amara Brigades
- Jaysh al-Islam
- Liwa al-Haqq
- Ansar al-Khilafah
- Fajr al-Khilafa Battalions
- Bayriq al-Islam Movement
- Bayan Movement
- Authenticity and Development Front
- Conquest Brigade
- Alwiya al-Furqan
- Jaysh al-Izza
- Nour al-Din al-Zenki Movement (until October 2016)
- Fastaqim Union (mostly defunct since November 2016)
- 23rd Division (formerly the 16th Division)
- 101st Infantry Division
- Sultan Murad Division
- Sultan Mehmed the Conqueror Brigade
- Sham Legion
- Army of Mujahideen
  - Levant Revolutionaries Battalions
- Freedom Brigade
- Central Division
- Levant Front
- Jaysh al-Sunna
- Sayf Allah Brigade
- Shuhadaa Atrib Brigade
- Al-Nukhba Forces
- Jaysh al-Nasr
- Free Idlib Army
  - Mountain Hawks Brigade
  - Northern Division
  - 13th Division
- Al-Fauj al-Awwal
- Elite Islamic Battalions

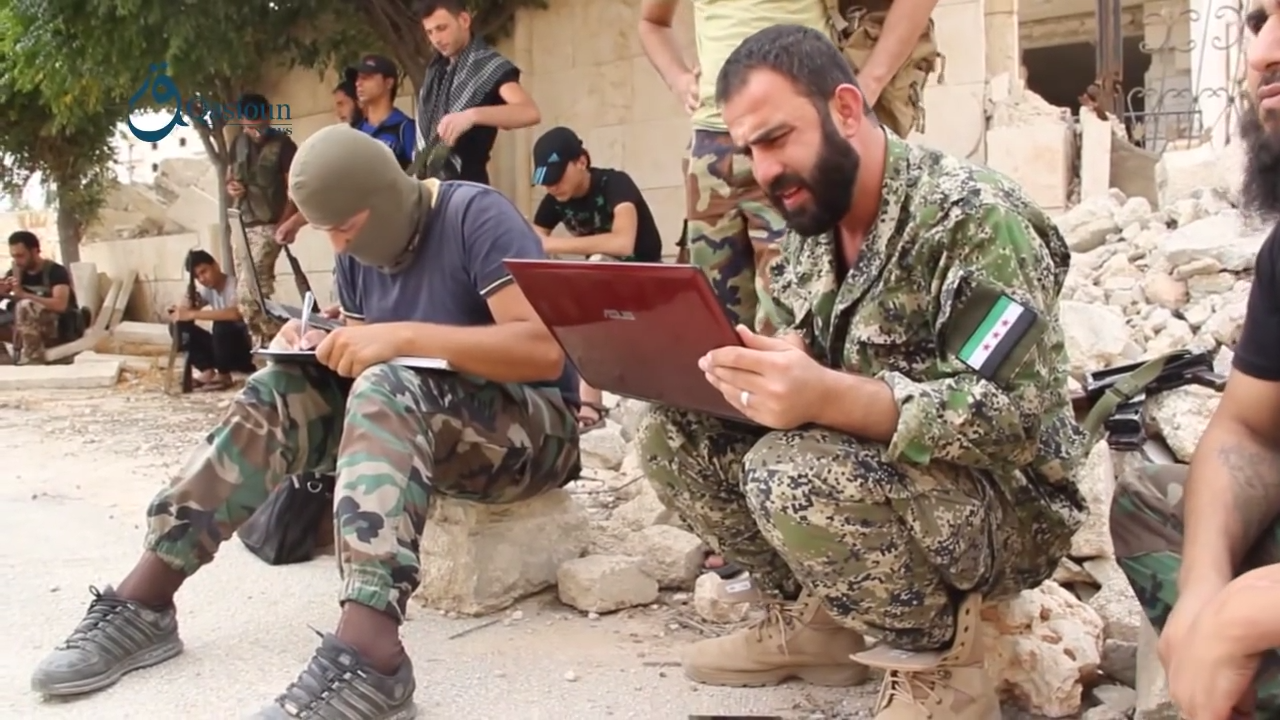
Major Yasser Abdul Rahim, commander of Fatah Halab and field commander of the Sham Legion in Aleppo, coordinate an attack on YPG positions in Aleppo, 2 October 2015.

== War crimes ==
On 13 May 2016, Amnesty International accused the Fatah Halab coalition of "repeated indiscriminate attacks that may amount to war crimes". It also reported their alleged use of chemical weapons.

A United Nations report in February 2017 came to the conclusion that during the siege of Eastern Aleppo Fatah Halab, after vowing to take revenge on Kurds in Sheikh Maqsoud, intentionally attacked civilian inhabited neighbourhoods of the Kurdish enclave, killing and maiming dozens of civilians, and that these acts constitute the war crime of directing attacks against a civilian population.

== See also ==
- List of armed groups in the Syrian Civil War
