= Aleppo offensive (July 2015) =

Rebel military operation in the Syrian Civil War

- Part of the Battle of Aleppo and the Syrian Civil War
- Situation in Aleppo city as of July 2015 Syrian Army control Opposition control Kurdish control Islamic State in Iraq & Levant Ongoing confrontation or unclear situation
Date	2–7 July 2015 (5 days)
Location	Aleppo, Syria
Result	Indecisive; Limited rebel gains
Territorial changes	Rebels capture the Scientific Research Center, but fail in their attack on Jamiyat al-Zahra

Belligerents
Fatah Halab: Levant Front; Free Syrian Army; Ansar al-Sharia: al-Nusra Front; Jabhat Ansar al-Din; Ansar al Khilafah; Mujahideen al Islam Movement; Al Tawhid Wal Jihad Brigade	(Syria) Syrian Arab Republic: Syrian Armed Forces; National Defense Force; Ba'ath Brigades; Al-Quds Brigade; Hezbollah

Casualties and losses
67 killed	55 killed

The Aleppo offensive (July 2015) was a military operation launched by two rebel coalitions against the Syrian Army, during the Syrian Civil War, in the city of Aleppo. The aim of the operation was to breach Army defenses and enter, and potentially take, the government-held western half of the city.

== The offensive ==
On 2 July, the major offensive was launched by two rebel coalitions, Fatah Halab and Ansar Sharia, the latter of which includes the Al-Qaeda-linked al-Nusra Front, with fighting focusing on the Jamiyat al-Zahra frontline. By the next day, the rebels seized some buildings in Jamiyat al-Zahra, but the advance was of no strategic importance and came at a cost of heavy casualties, with 35 rebels being killed amidst heavy air-strikes. At least 18 soldiers were killed in the fighting. In the evening, government troops managed to recapture the areas they lost.

On 4 July, the Fatah Halab managed to seize the Scientific Research Center on Aleppo's western outskirts, thus overcoming the first major government fortification and potentially threatening government-held areas of Aleppo. Later during the day, government fighters launched a counter-attack against the Scientific Research Center, and managed to enter the eastern outskirts of the Center but were forced to retreat outside the complex's walls after heavy shelling. 12 more rebels and 12 soldiers were killed in the clashes. As of 5 July, the attack on Jamiyat al-Zahra had largely failed, while the military was still attempting to recapture the Center.

On the evening of 6 July, a suicide bomber hit government positions in Jamiyat al-Zahra, leaving 25 government fighters dead. The ensuing fighting also left 19 rebels dead and opposition activists claimed rebel forces managed to capture several buildings. Fighting also continued at the Center.

By 7 July, the renewed rebel attack on al-Zahra had been repelled, while the military reportedly used chlorine gas in an attempt to regain control of the Scientific Research Center. The opposition activist group the SOHR reported there were no casualties among the rebels since most of them were wearing gas masks.

== See also ==
- Siege of Aleppo (637)
- Battle of Aleppo (2012–2016)
