= Al-Fauj al-Awwal =

Syrian rebel group formed in 2015

- الفوج الأول
- Logo of Al-Fauj al-Awwal
- Military leader: Hassem Kenjo †
- Dates active: 5 March 2015 - 29 January 2025
- Split from: Levant Front
- Country: Syria
- Active regions: Aleppo Governorate, Hama Governorate
- Ideology: Sunni Islamism; Syrian nationalism
- Status: Dissolved
- Size: 1,500 militants (2016 estimate)
- Part of: (Syrian opposition) Free Syrian Army (Syrian opposition) Syrian National Army
- Wars: Syrian Civil War

Al-Fauj al-Awwal (Arabic: الفوج الأول, lit. 'The 1st Regiment') was an armed rebel group formed in 2015 during the Syrian Civil War.

== History ==
Al-Fauj al-Awwal was founded by former fighters of Liwa al-Tawhid on 5 March 2015, amid the Syrian Civil War. The group was initially part the Levant Front, with which they were split from in late 2015. The group was affiliated with the Free Syrian Army. Al-Fauj al-Awwal helped found the Ansar al-Sharia Joint Operations Room that became active in Aleppo on 2 July 2015. The group eventually ended up joining the Fatah Halab Joint Operations Room in early 2016. In April 2016, they were again transferred to the Hawar Kilis Operation Room.

Al-Fauj al-Awwal was Islamist according to Jennifer Cafarella and Genevieve Casagrande, analysts for the Institute for the Study of War. The group was led by Hassem Kenjo, who was killed in combat in Aleppo, in the Sheikh Saïd district, on 17 November 2016. The group had an estimated 1,500 men within its ranks during 2016, although the current number was unknown. From the end of 2015, the group obtained several BGM-71 TOW anti-tank missiles delivered by the United States. It also obtained weapons that were delivered by Turkey around the same time.

The group was active in the city of Aleppo and in the northern region of the Aleppo governorate, but it has also intervened occasionally in the Hama governorate. They participated in the Battle of Aleppo, the siege of Nubl and al-Zahraa and the Battle of al-Bab. The group took part in Operation Euphrates Shield from 2016, alongside the Turkish Land Forces.

Al-Fauj al-Awwal was later reported to have joined the Syrian National Army sometime before November 2019, as a component of the 342nd Brigade within the Syrian National Army structure.

== See also ==
- Liwa Ahrar Souriya
