= Leon Sedov Brigade =

Trotskyist militant group participating in the Syrian civil war

- لواء ليون سيدوف
- Leaders: Abu Muad; Abu al-Baraa †
- Dates active: June 2012 – December 2016
- Allegiance: International Trotskyist Leninist Faction
- Ideology: Trotskyism (Third camp); Permanent revolution; Revolutionary socialism
- Size: 200
- Part of: Free Syrian Army: Levant Front (May – June 2015)

The Leon Sedov Brigade (Arabic: لواء ليون سيدوف) was a Syrian Third camp Trotskyist militant group in the area of Aleppo. Although its founders were Argentinian foreign fighters, the overwhelming majority of its members were local industrial workers and, due to its stance against foreign involvement in the Syrian civil war, was solely funded by members' wages and ran by officers elected by them. It is named for Leon Sedov, the first son of Leon Trotsky. It is the military wing of the International Leninist Trotskyist Faction and thus shares its basic positions of opposing both Salafi jihadist groups (including Hay'at Tahrir al-Sham and the Islamic State) and pro-Western liberal Free Syrian Army factions as counter-revolutionary, and all foreign involvement in the Syrian civil war (including the Turkish-backed Free Syrian Army, Russian Armed Forces and the US-led coalition-backed Syrian Democratic Forces) as imperialist.

== History ==
The Leon Sedov Brigade was founded in Libya in 2012 by a group of ten to twelve Argentinians fighting against the government of Muammar Ghaddafi. After the fall of the Libyan government and beginning of the Syrian civil war in 2011, the group's members entered Syria via Turkey and began fighting the Syrian government alongside armed Syrian opposition groups. Members of the Leon Sedov Brigade worked in factories and on construction sites in Aleppo to build local ties and raise funds, as well as to recruit local fighters to build a "workers' army".

In 2013, the Leon Sedov Brigade came into conflict with the Nour al-Din al-Zenki Movement. The Leon Sedov Brigade's leader claimed the Nour al-Din al-Zenki Movement was sheltering a local Shabiha commander who was stealing property from the locals. The Leon Sedov Brigade proceeded to arrest the Shabiha commander when he was unprotected. The arrest prompted groups linked to the Nour al-Din al-Zenki Movement to arrive at the Leon Sedov Brigade's headquarters and demand the release of the Shabiha commander. The Leon Sedov Brigade refused, resulting in a minor clash. The Nour al-Din al-Zenki Movement later requested mediation from Jabhat al-Nusra. Al-Nusra reportedly asked the Leon Sedov Brigade to release the Shabiha commander. The Leon Sedov Brigade again refused; al-Nusra responded by sending a group of Central Asian fighters to attack the Leon Sedov Brigade, and the Shabiha commander was released soon after.

Abu Muad, the leader of the Leon Sedov Brigade, was captured by the Islamic State of Iraq and the Levant (ISIL) in 2013 and held for several days inside a school. He claims ISIL attempted to blackmail him and took his possessions. Protesters later demanded that ISIL release him and a local helped him escape. He claims that after escaping from ISIL's custody they apologized for detaining him, returned his possessions, and offered him food for Ramadan.

The Leon Sedov Brigade fought alongside an assortment of other rebel groups, including the Muslim Brotherhood-linked Sham Legion, and attempted to form a united front against the Syrian government.

It opposes the U.S. intervention in Syria against ISIL which began in 2014. In a statement from Aleppo in 2015, it condemned Kurdish leaders for collaborating with the Syrian government.

The Leon Sedov Brigade joined the Levant Front in May 2015 but left after a month. In spite of the political differences between the Leon Sedov Brigade and larger opposition groups such as Ahrar al-Sham, the brigade continued to work with them on the ground in Aleppo and surrounding areas against the Syrian government and YPG. They eventually disbanded after Syrian government forces retook control of Aleppo.

== See also ==
- Fourth International
- Syrian Communist Party (Unified)
- List of military units named after people
- Russia–Syria relations
- Arab socialism

== See also ==
- People's Liberation Faction, another Trotskyist Free Syrian Army unit in the Syrian civil war
