= Ein Al-Tal =

Palestinian refugee camp in Syria

Ein al Tal عين التل Handarat Camp
- Palestinian refugee camp
- Location in Syria
- Coordinates: 36°16′38″N 37°10′55″E
- Country: Syria
- Governorate: Aleppo Governorate
- Mintaqa: Mount Simeon District
- Established: 1962

Area
  - Total: 0.16 km^{2} (0.062 sq mi)

Population (Pre-war)
  - Total: 7,000 (pre-war)
- Time zone: UTC+3 (AST)
- Area code: 11

Ein al-Tal Camp (Arabic: مخيم عين التل), or Handarat camp, is a 0.16-square-kilometer (40-acre) Palestinian refugee camp near the village of Handarat. It is located 13 kilometers (8.1 mi) north-east of Aleppo. The pre-war population of the camp was around 7,000. The entirety of the camp's population was displaced during the Battle of Aleppo, and the camp sustained heavy damages.
