= Nour al-Din al-Zenki Movement =

Former Sunni Islamist rebel group involved in the Syrian Civil War

- حركة نور الدين الزنكي
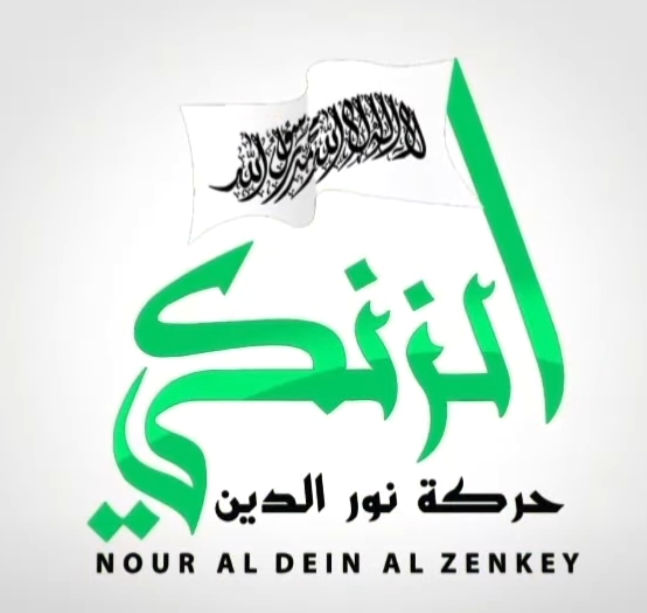
- Logo of the Nour al-Din al-Zenki Movement
- Leaders: Sheikh Tawfiq Shahabuddin (top leader); Ammar Shaaban †; Abu 'Abdo Saroukh; Abdel-Fattah Mansour †; Mustafa Waddah; Ahmed Rizk
- Dates active: November 2011 – March 2019; February 2023 – 29 January 2025
- Groups: Liwa Ahrar Souriya (former); Swords of Shahba Brigade (former); Northern Army (former); Liwa Suyuf al-Sham (Greater Idlib area); Banners of Islam Movement (former); Levant Revolutionaries Battalions (former); al-Quds Brigades; Glory of Islam Brigade; al-Noor Islamic Movement; Abu Hassan Battalion; Sheikh Osman Battalion; Ansaruddin Battalion; Humat al-Islam
- Active regions: Aleppo Governorate and Idlib Governorate, Syria
- Ideology: Sunni Islamism; Jihadism (2013-2014, 2017-present); Democracy (2014-2017)
- Size: 3,000-10,000 (2016 estimate); 7,000 (2017)
- Part of: Fastaqim Union (2012); Al-Tawhid Brigade (July 2012–August 2013); Authenticity and Development Front (August 2013–January 2014); Army of Mujahideen (January–May 2014); Levant Front (December 2014–April 2015); Syrian Revolutionary Command Council (2014–late 2015); Fatah Halab (2015–17); Free Syrian Army (2012–2017); Hay'at Tahrir al-Sham (2017); Syrian Liberation Front (2018–19); National Front for Liberation (2018-19); Syrian National Army (from 2019)
- Wars: the Syrian Civil War

The Nour al-Din al-Zenki Movement (Arabic: حركة نور الدين الزنكي Ḥaraka Nūr ad-Dīn az-Zankī) was a Sunni Islamist rebel group involved in the Syrian Civil War. In 2014, it was reportedly one of the most influential factions in Aleppo, especially the Western Aleppo countryside. Between 2014 and 2015, it was part of the Syrian Revolutionary Command Council and recipient of U.S.-made BGM-71 TOW anti-tank missiles. The Movement made multiple attempts to merge with the larger Islamist rebel group Ahrar al-Sham but were refused by Ahrar al-Sham's leadership. The Zenki Movement also made attempts to merge with other Islamist factions, Jaysh al-Islam and the Sham Legion. However, all merging efforts with these groups failed, leading to the Zenki Movement joining the Salafi Islamist Hayat Tahrir al-Sham (HTS) in 2017. But after a few months the group left HTS and within a year went to war with HTS by joining the Turkish-backed Syrian Liberation Front alongside Ahrar al-Sham on 18 February 2018. After a series of clashes in early 2019, Al Zenki were largely defeated by HTS, expelled to Afrin and absorbed in the Turkish-backed Syrian National Army.

At the Syrian Revolution Victory Conference, which was held on 29 January 2025, most factions of the armed opposition, including the Nour al-Din al-Zenki Movement, announced their dissolution and were incorporated into the newly formed Ministry of Defense.

== History ==
=== Early years ===
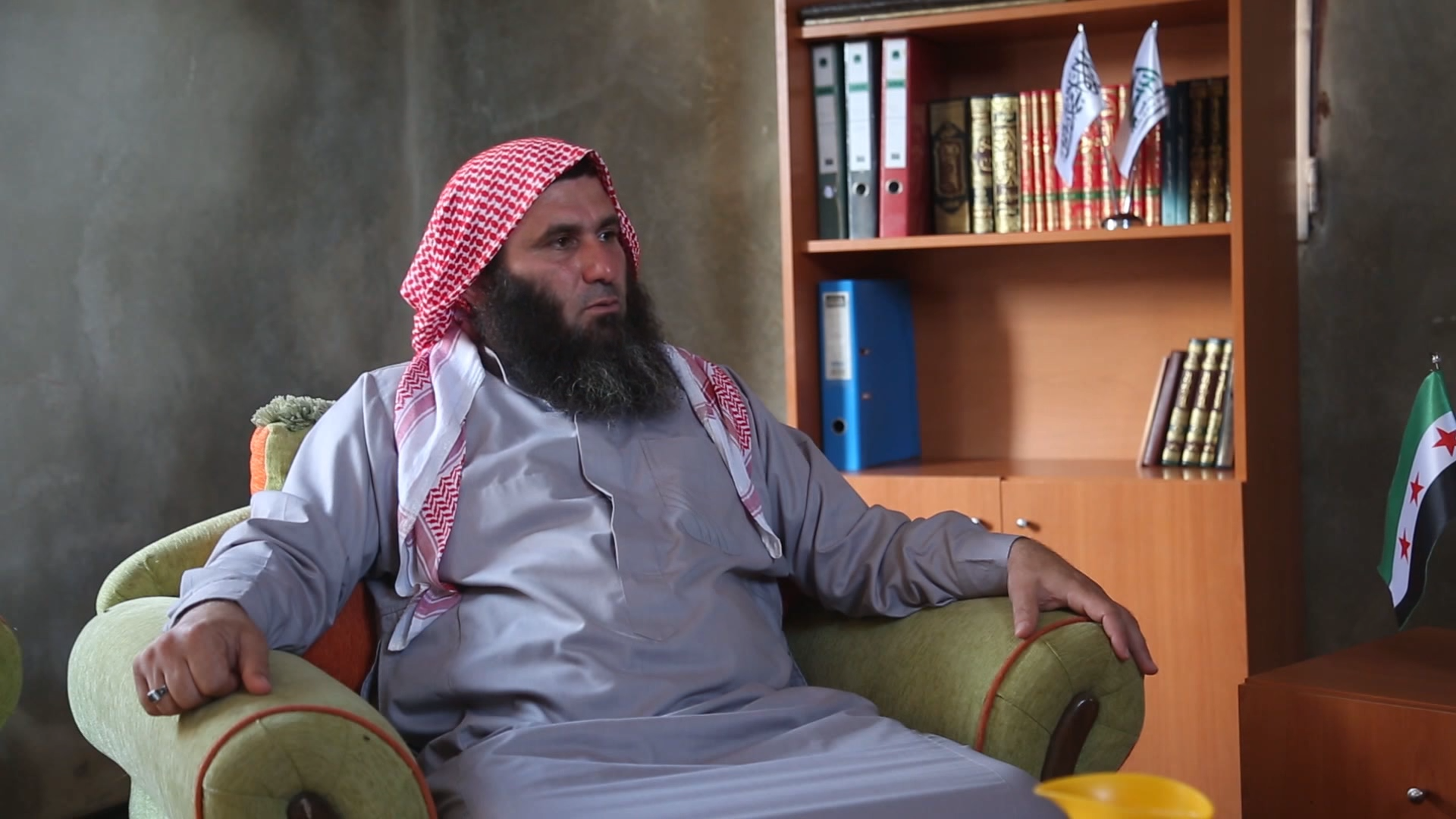
Sheikh Tawfiq Shahabuddin, leader of the Nour al-Din al-Zenki Movement.

The Nour al-Din al-Zenki Battalions was formed in late 2011 by Sheikh Tawfiq Shahabuddin in the Sheikh Salman area north-west of Aleppo. It was named after Nur ad-Din Zengi, atabeg of Aleppo, an emir of Damascus and Aleppo in the 12th century. The group's greatest concentration of fighters in the city of Aleppo were in its northwestern suburbs. Nour al-Din al-Zenki took part in the initial battles that started the Battle of Aleppo in July 2012, capturing the Salaheddine neighborhood, although it soon withdrew to its heartland in the countryside.

The group went through many affiliations after it was founded. It was initially a branch of the Dawn Movement, then went on to join the al-Tawhid Brigades during the attack on Aleppo, before withdrawing and allying with the Saudi-backed Authenticity and Development Front.

In January 2014, Nour al-Din al-Zenki was one of the founding factions in the anti-ISIL umbrella group Army of Mujahideen. In May 2014 it withdrew from the alliance and subsequently received increased financial support from Saudi Arabia, which had been reluctant to support the Army of Mujahideen due to its links with the Syrian Muslim Brotherhood.

In December 2014, Nour al-Din al-Zenki joined the Levant Front, a broad coalition of Islamist rebel groups operating in Aleppo. At this point, it was reported to have 1,000 fighters.

On 6 May 2015, it joined 13 other Aleppo-based groups in the Fatah Halab joint operations room.

On 6 October 2015, positions of the Nour al-Din al-Zenki Movement in Aleppo city was attacked by al-Qaeda's al-Nusra Front. 19 October 2015, the military commander of the group was reported as killed during fighting with government forces near the Aleppo area.

Since November 2015, the Nour al-Din al-Zenki Movement absorbed several Syrian Turkmen groups supported by Turkey. On 11 November 35 Turkmen fighters in the group defected to the al-Nusra Front, and on 15 November, one of its leaders was replaced by a Turkmen commander.

During the November 2015 Vienna peace talks for Syria, Jordan was tasked with formulating a list of terrorist groups; the group was reported to have been placed on this list.

On 28 January 2016, the Nour al-Din al-Zenki Movement withdrew from its positions in Aleppo, which were then taken over by the al-Nusra Front. In the same month, the group's headquarters included banners of quotes from prominent Salafist jihadist figures, including Abdullah Azzam.

=== 2016: With Jaish al-Fatah ===
On 24 September 2016, al-Zenki joined the Army of Conquest. On 15 October 2016, four 'battalions' left the Levant Front (they were also former members of Al-Tawhid Brigade) and joined the group.

In October 2016 a group of fighters from the Levant Front that were former al-Tawhid Brigade members left the Levant Front and joined the Nour al-Din al-Zenki Movement.

On 2 November 2016, during the Aleppo offensive, Fastaqim Union fighters captured a military commander of the Zenki Movement. In response, al-Zenki fighters attacked the Fastaqim Union's headquarters in the Salaheddine District and al-Ansari district of Aleppo. At least one rebel were killed and more than 25 wounded on both sides in the raid. The next day, the Levant Front and the Abu Amara Brigades began to patrol the streets to arrest any rebels taking part in the clashes. At least 18 rebels were killed in the infighting. The Zenki Movement and the Abu Amara Brigades eventually captured all positions of the Fastaqim Union in eastern Aleppo. Dozens of rebels from the latter group surrendered and were either captured, joined Ahrar al-Sham, or deserted.

On 15 November 2016, Liwa Ahrar Souriya and the Swords of Shahba Brigade announced that it has pledged allegiance and joined the Nour al-Din al-Zenki Movement. Also during November, the Northern Army joined.

In December, Liwa Suyuf al-Sham's Aleppo branch joined the group, while its Azaz branch joined the Levant Front.

On 27 January, the Northern Army left Nour al-Din al-Zenki Movement and joined the Levant Front.

=== 2017: With HTS ===
The following day, the group's Idlib branch joined Tahrir al-Sham while its northern branch defected to Sham Legion. The branch then formed the Revolutionary Knights Brigade at the end of February. It later became involved in fighting against other TFS factions in northern Aleppo.

=== Separation from HTS ===
On 20 July 2017, the Nour al-Din al-Zenki Movement led by Sheikh Tawfiq Shahabuddin announced its withdrawal from Tahrir al-Sham amid widespread conflict between HTS and Ahrar al-Sham, and became an independent group. In a statement released by the Nour al-Din al-Zenki Movement, the group stated the separation was over the following reasons,

- Lack of applying the ruling of Shari'a for which we expended our lifeblood and what is precious to implement its ruling. That became manifest as follows:
  - Neglecting the fatwa committee in the commission [Hay'at Tahrir al-Sham] and the issuing of a statement from the Shari'i council without the knowledge of most of its members.
  - The lack of acceptance of the initiative that the virtuous 'ulama launched last Thursday night.
- Neglecting the Shura council of the commission [Hay'at Tahrir al-Sham] and taking the decision to fight Ahrar al-Sham despite the fact that the commission's formation was built on the basis of not committing aggression against the factions.

=== 2019: Defeat by HTS, withdrawal to Afrin ===
In January 2019, the group came under attack by HTS, with HTS capturing most of the towns held by the group. The offensive attacked the Al-Zenki areas from multiple locations, with allegations from Zenki that HTS has set up a situation where they would be seen as responding to aggression against themselves, after four of their members were attacked. The HTS offensive against Al Zenki was largely successful, with HTS gaining most of the Al Zenki held villages and towns. Al Zenki was beaten in Idlib, with some members joining either the NLF (an allied Turkish supported force) or fleeing into the Turkish held Afrin canton. Al Zenki tried to take some of its tanks and armored forces into Afrin, but these were destroyed.

After withdrawing to Afrin on 5 February 2019 the group began clashing with Ahrar al-Sharqiya which is composed of exiles from eastern Syria, many of whom were in either al-Nusra or Ahrar al-Sham, many also belong to the Shaitat tribe, the clashes began over unknown reasons and heavy weapons were reportedly used.

On 25 March 2019, the group announced its own dissolution and that remaining elements would be integrated into the Syrian National Army's Third Legion and would be merged with the Glory Corps. Remnants of the Nour al-Din al-Zenki Movement subsequently took part in the 2019 Turkish offensive into north-eastern Syria.

=== 2020: Resurgence ===
In late January 2020, former Zenki fighters, part of the Glory Corps, had entered the western Aleppo countryside which was formerly the Nour al-Din al-Zenki Movement's stronghold until being ousted by HTS, to defend the area from pro-government advances.

=== 2024: Operation Deterrence of Aggression ===
As of 27 November 2024, it appears as though the Nour al-Din al-Zenki Movement has become active again as an independent entity. The group has been reported as one of the factions participating in the HTS-led 2024 Syrian opposition offensives without any mention of the Glory Corps.

Following the Syrian revolution victory, the Nour al Din al Zenki Movement was reorganized into the 80th Division of the Syrian Army.

== Foreign support ==
In May 2014 al-Zenki received increased financial support from Saudi Arabia after it withdrew from the Army of Mujahideen. The group also received financial aid from the United States, in a CIA run program to support US-approved rebel groups, reportedly via the Turkey-based Military Operation Centre (MOC). However, by October 2015, the group claimed that it was no longer supplied by the MOC – "because of regular reports that it had committed abuses."

On 9 May 2016, a plan was reportedly proposed by the US, Turkey, Saudi Arabia, and Qatar to have the Nour al-Din al-Zenki Movement form a "Northern Army" to gather more than 3,000 fighters for the operation. The next phase will be to transfer the fighters from Idlib to northern Aleppo through the Bab al-Hawa Border Crossing and the Azaz border crossing. This reportedly began on 13 May. However, the plan was delayed due to doubts from U.S. officials about the capabilities of the Syrian rebel forces that Turkey had recruited to fight with its military, the opposition from the US-backed Syrian Democratic Forces, and the rift between Turkey and Russia that had only been mended in early August 2016.

== War crimes ==
According to the Amnesty International, the Nour al-Din al-Zenki Movement, along with the 16th Division, the Levant Front, Ahrar al-Sham, and the al-Nusra Front, were involved in abduction and torture of journalists and humanitarian workers in rebel-held Aleppo during 2014 and 2015.

=== 2016 beheading incident ===
On 19 July 2016, during the Aleppo offensive, a video emerged that appeared to show al-Zenki fighters recording themselves taunting and later beheading a Palestinian boy named Abdullah Tayseer Al Issa. In the video, they claim he had been captured while fighting with the pro-government militia Liwa al-Quds. Liwa al-Quds denied this, and claimed instead that Al Issa was a 12-year-old Palestinian refugee from a poor family who had been kidnapped.

The following day, a social media account purportedly owned by Al Issa's sister, Zoze Al Issa, claimed that Issa was a Syrian from the Wadi al-Dahab district of Homs, who had volunteered to fight with pro-government forces. The New Arab published a photograph purporting to be the boy's identity card and putting his age at 19 years old. The report also quoted a cousin who claimed that Al Issa's had thalassemia, which causes stunted growth.

In a statement, al-Zenki condemned the killing and claimed it was an "individual mistake that does not represent the general policy of the group", and that it had detained those involved.

According to Thomas Joscelyn, writing in The Weekly Standard, U.S. President Donald Trump was shown the beheading video in 2017, and it influenced Trump's decision to end the CIA's support for anti-Assad Syrian rebels: "Trump wanted to know why the United States had backed Zenki if its members are extremists. The issue was discussed at length with senior intelligence officials, and no good answers were forthcoming."

== See also ==
- List of armed groups in the Syrian Civil War
