= Saleh al-Abdullah =

Ba'athist Syrian general (born 1967)

Major General Saleh al-Abdullah
- Native name: صالح العبدالله
- Nickname: The Lion (السبع)
- Born: 1967 (age 58–59); Taiba, Safita, Tartus, Syria
- Allegiance: Ba'athist Syria
- Branch: Syrian Arab Army
- Rank: Major general
- Commands: 25th Special Mission Forces Division; 30th Division; Security and Military Committee in Aleppo; 16th Brigade; Security and Military Committee in Maharda; 224th Battalion
- Conflicts: Syrian civil war; Siege of Daraa; Siege of Hama (2011); Battle of Aleppo (2012–2016); Aleppo offensive (October–December 2013); Operation Canopus Star; Aleppo offensive (November–December 2016); Battle of Idlib (2015); Northwestern Syria offensive (April–June 2015); Aleppo offensive (October–December 2015); 2016 Khanasir offensive; 2016 Latakia offensive; East Aleppo offensive (2017); 2017 Southern Raqqa offensive; Deir ez-Zor offensive (September–November 2017); Rif Dimashq offensive (February–April 2018); 2018 Southern Syria offensive; Northwestern Syria offensive (April–August 2019); Northwestern Syria offensive (2019–2020); Daraa insurgency; 2021 Daraa offensive; Syrian Desert campaign (December 2017 – December 2024); 2024 Syrian opposition offensives; Battle of Aleppo (2024)

Saleh al-Abdullah (Arabic: صالح العبدالله; born 1967), (Note: Also spelled "صالح العبد الله") nicknamed The Lion, is a Syrian former military officer who had served as commander of the 25th Special Mission Forces Division, an elite special forces unit formerly known as the Tiger Forces, from April 2024 until the fall of the Assad regime. He previously served as commander of the 30th Division from 2022 to 2024, head of the Security and Military Committee in Aleppo from 2023 to 2024, and commander of the Russian-affiliated 16th Brigade since 2020.

He began his military career in the 1980s, serving in the 7th Division upon graduating from Homs Military Academy. Upon the outbreak of the Syrian civil war in 2011, he participated in storming operations in Daraa and Hama Governorate. In 2015, he was promoted to assistant of Suhayl al-Hasan and as Operations Officer of the Tiger Forces, overseeing its troop deployment throughout various campaigns, such as during Operation Northern Storm and the Dawn of Idlib offensive.

== Early life ==
He was born in Taiba, Safita, in 1967 to Alawite parents. He joined the Homs Military Academy in 1985 and, upon graduation, was assigned to the 7th Division of the Syrian Arab Army, stationed in Rif Dimashq Governorate. Upon the start of the Syrian revolution in March 2011, he served as commander of the 244th Battalion of the 121st Mechanized Brigade of the 7th Division, holding the rank of colonel.

== Role during the Syrian civil war ==
=== Daraa and Hama Governorates (2011) ===
During the Siege of Daraa, he participated in storming Al-Omari Mosque in Daraa, where residents protesting in its courtyard were killed and arrested. He also participated in other storming operations that took place in Daraa Governorate until he and his battalion were transferred to Hama in July 2011, where he participated in storming the city on 31 July, which led to the killing of 95 civilians and many injuries on the city's residents.

=== Hama Governorate (2011–2016) ===
In 2012, he was appointed head of the Security and Military Committee in Maharda, and was stationed in Saint George's Monastery. He participated in storming operations in villages in Hama Governorate, such as Halfaya, Kafr Nabudah, Karnaz, Al-Lataminah, Kafr Zita, and Suran.

According to Pro Justice, he is responsible for various massacres committed by Assad regime forces in Hama Governorate from 2012 to 2016, such as in Al-Qubeir, Tremseh, Halfaya, Al-Jalamah, Maarzaf, Al-Lataminah, and Kafr Zita.

=== Homs, Aleppo, and Idlib Governorates (2014–2016) ===
He participated in the Battle of Hosn on 20 March 2014 in western Homs Governorate, helping government forces recapture Al-Zarah and the Krak des Chevaliers. He also commanded military operations in Aleppo Governorate during the Battle of Aleppo, such as Operation Northern Storm and Operation Canopus Star. He also participated in the 2015 Battle of Idlib, the 2015 Jisr al-Shughur offensive, and the 2016 Khanasir offensive.

=== Operations Officer of the Tiger Forces (2015–2018) ===
In 2015, al-Abdullah was appointed as assistant to Suhayl al-Hasan, commander of the Tiger Forces, an elite special forces unit renamed to the 25th Special Mission Forces Division in August 2019, as well as Operations Officer of the Tiger Forces. He was promoted to brigadier general on 1 January 2016, and earned the nickname "The Lion". He continued participating in the Battle of Aleppo in the second half of 2016, including its last offensive in November, as well as the 2016 Latakia offensive, the 2017 East Aleppo offensive, the 2017 Southern Raqqa offensive, the September–November 2017 Deir ez-Zor offensive, Operation Damascus Steel, and in Operation Basalt.

=== Northwestern Syria offensive (2019–2020) ===
He participated in the Dawn of Idlib offensive in 2019, helping to oversee the deployment and battle operations of Tiger Forces in Hama Governorate. On 21 June 2019, Jamil Hassan visited al-Abdullah in an inspection tour to the northern Hama frontlines, telling him, "I came to be with you where heroic deeds are made and epics of pride and dignity are written".

He also participated in the Dawn of Idlib 2 offensive in 2020, supervising the 25th Division's military operations during and after the offensive.

=== Commander of the 16th Brigade (2020–2021) ===
In June 2020, he was appointed commander of the 16th Brigade, a Russian-affiliated military formation based in Aleppo Governorate, upon its formation. His position as assistant of Suhayl al-Hasan was succeeded by Yunis Muhammad.

In February 2021, he oversaw the deployment of military reinforcements from the 16th Brigade near the opposition-held city of Al-Bab, alongside military personnel from the 25th Division.

In late August 2021, he oversaw the deployment of 16th Brigade members into Daraa during the 2021 Daraa offensive alongside members of the 4th Division, and accompanied convoys of military reinforcements.

=== Military promotions (2021–2024) ===
In early February 2021, during a meeting with Russian military personnel in Khmeimim Air Base, Brigadier General Dmitry Valerievich Glushchenkov awarded him second-class Russian army medals, decorations, and a letter of appreciation and commendation.

He was sanctioned by the European Union on 21 July 2022 for his position within the Syrian Arab Armed Forces and involvement in recruiting members of the 16th Brigade to fight alongside Russia in the Russian invasion of Ukraine.

In October 2022, he was appointed commander of the 30th Division. Prior to his appointment, he had served as its deputy commander since July 2022. In January 2023, he was promoted to major general. In October 2023, he was appointed head of the Security and Military Committee in Aleppo Governorate, succeeding Nizar Younes.

On 9 April 2024, he was appointed commander of the 25th Special Mission Forces Division, succeeding Suhayl al-Hasan. His position in the 30th Division and the Security Committee was succeeded by Mohammad Salman Saftli.

=== Syrian Desert campaign (June–August 2024) ===
In June 2024, as part of the overarching Syrian Desert campaign, al-Abdullah and the 25th Division participated in a new military campaign against the Islamic State (ISIS), stating on 7 June that his forces had begun a joint military operation with Russian forces, intending on "preventing the American enemy from carrying out attacks in the Syrian Desert through ISIS". On 4 October 2024, a new campaign led by the 25th Division was launched, focused on combing locations in eastern Homs and southern Raqqa Governorates.

According to Al-Quds Al-Arabi, Russia prematurely halted the combing operations in October 2024 due to concerns of a potential offensive from Idlib Governorate against Assad regime positions, and a few days later, al-Abdullah visited western rural Aleppo Governorate on 11 October to oversee the distribution and deployment of military personnel.

=== Northwestern Syria offensive (2024) ===
Following the start of Operation Deterrence of Aggression, spearheaded by Hay'at Tahrir al-Sham, he commanded the 25th Division during the 2024 Battle of Aleppo. On 28 and 29 November, he participated in a secret meeting at Kuweires Military Airbase, which included Chief of Staff Abdul Karim Mahmoud Ibrahim and Sergey Kisel. According to Middle East Eye, he arrived at the outskirts of Aleppo by 29 November alongside Suhayl al-Hasan to reinforce army positions, as well as taking positions at Al-Nayrab Airport, later withdrawing shortly afterwards to Hama and establishing defensive positions.

According to New Lines Magazine, al-Abdullah quarrelled with al-Hasan over control of military operations in Aleppo Governorate, which Alpheratz Magazine said had been recorded in text conversations from confiscated phones of regime officers. According to analyst Gregory Waters, in the wake of the fall of Aleppo, al-Abdullah was sacked on 2 December for failing to organize his division, being succeeded by al-Hasan, and may have been arrested.

After the fall of the Assad regime on 8 December 2024, his whereabouts currently remain unknown.
