= Operation Canopus Star =

Military operation during the Syrian Civil War

- Part of the Battle of Aleppo and the Syrian Civil War
- Situation in Aleppo Governorate on 20 October 2014, after the operation Syrian Army control Opposition control Kurdish control ISIL Ongoing confrontation or unclear situation
Date	7 December 2013 – 20 October 2014 (10 months, 1 week and 6 days)
Location	Aleppo Governorate, Syria
Result	Syrian government victory
Territorial changes	Syrian Army captures all of the towns on the eastern outskirts of Aleppo, the Sheikh Najjar industrial zone to the northeast and Handarat to the north; Syrian Army breaks the siege of Aleppo's central prison

Belligerents
Syrian Opposition; (Syrian opposition) Free Syrian Army; Ahrar ash-Sham; Al-Nusra Front	(Syria) Syrian Government; Hezbollah

Commanders and leaders
(Syrian opposition) Unknown	Col. Suhayl al-Hasan

Units involved
(Syrian opposition) Free Syrian Army; Nour al-Din al-Zenki Movement; Jaysh Mohammad Brigade	Syrian Armed Forces; Syrian Army: Republican Guard; Tiger Forces; Desert Hawks Brigade; National Defence Forces; Syrian Air Force; Ba'ath Brigades; Liwa Al-Quds; Local Defence Forces; Baqir Brigade (claimed)

Casualties and losses
- 3,100+ civilians killed due to government barrel bombs (January–December 2014; per VDC); 670+ civilians killed due to rebel hell cannon fire (January–December 2014; per SOHR)

Operation Canopus Star (Arabic: عملية نجم سهيل) was an operation launched by the Syrian Army, supported by Hezbollah and other allied militias, during the Syrian Civil War, following a successful offensive which re-established the military's supply route between Aleppo and central Syria. The aim of the operation was to encircle Aleppo and cut rebel supply lines into the city, thus besieging rebel-held areas.

== The operation ==
=== Aleppo air blitz ===
On 7 December 2013, an air raid on the town of Bezaa killed at least 20 people, including eight children and nine women.

Between 15 and 28 December, a series of Army helicopter attacks with barrel bombs against rebel-held areas of Aleppo left 517 people dead, including 151 children, 46 women and 46 rebels, according to the SOHR. 76 of those killed died on the first day alone, while 93–100 people were killed on 22 December. By 18 December, 879 people were wounded. During the first four days the attacks were concentrated on Aleppo city, but on 19 December, the helicopter strikes were expanded to include surrounding villages. A rebel commander claimed that by 26 December, more than 1,000 people had been killed in the bombing campaign. By the end of 6 January, the death toll in the bombings had risen to 603, including 172 children, 54 women and 52 rebels. On 9 January, aid groups stated more than 700 people had been killed since the start of the bombing campaign.

On 25 December, pro-government sources claimed that the Syrian Army captured the al-Jbanat area near Aleppo's al-Sheikh Maqsoud neighbourhood.

=== Eastern Aleppo battles ===
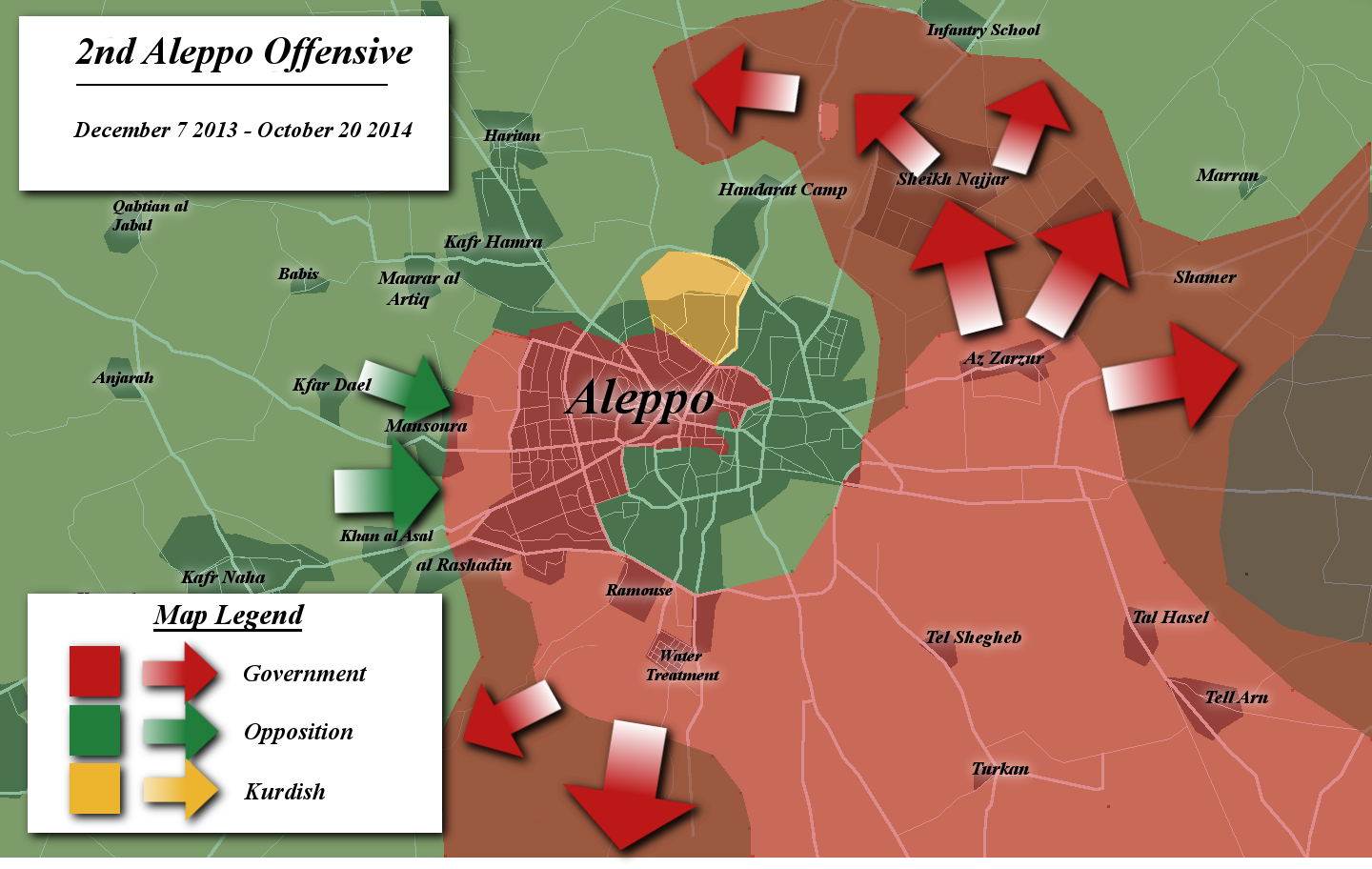
Map of the offensive

On 11 January 2014, government forces secured the area of al-Naqqarin and Sheikh Yusuf hill and were advancing towards the industrial area of Aleppo city. According to opposition activists, the rebels were in fear of losing the industrial district, which would cut their supply lines from Turkey. The next day, the Army also advanced towards the highway linking the airport to the government-held western part of the city.

On 14 January, the Army reportedly captured al-Zarzour, al-Taaneh, al-Subeihieh and Height 53 on the eastern outskirts of Aleppo. On 15 January, an Al-Manar correspondent reported that the Army captured al-Sabaheyya, al-Faory and Tal-Riman, east of Al-Safira, and was pushing towards the electricity station, northeast of Al-Safira. Later, Al-Manar claimed that the Army captured Tall Alam and Huwejna, east of Aleppo, also on the approaches to the electricity station. At the same time, government troops pushed out of Kweires military airport, east of Aleppo and the station, and captured villages around the base.

On 17 January, the Army bombarded the villages of Tal-Na'am, Jobul and Tal-Estabel and captured the village of Tal-Sobeha. By 18 January, it was confirmed government troops captured the town of Tall Alam, just west of the power plant. Sheikh Zayat, on the southern outskirts of the industrial zone, was also captured.

On 21 January, clashes took place around the village of Balat, accompanied by an air raid on the village.

On 22 January, the Army made an attempt to advance on the central Aziziyeh district of Aleppo city. At the same time, the town of Aziza, on the southern outskirts of Aleppo, came under rebel attack which was continuing as of 24 January. On 25 January, the Army captured the neighborhood of Karam Al Qasr on the eastern side of Aleppo city, after three days of fighting.

On 27 January, fighting was renewed in the area of the Umayyad Mosque in Aleppo's Old City, as the rebels claimed of destroying a Hezbollah base at Mount Hoihna and capturing most of the buildings in the town Maarath Al-Artik, on Aleppo's northwest outskirts.

On 28 January, rebels captured the Maarath Al-Artik mountain, which the Army used to shell nearby rebel-held towns. On the same day, the Army made more advances and seized the districts of Ballura and Kasr al-Tarrab, according to the pro-government al-Watan newspaper. It too said that an operation had been launched from Nairab airport in the east, as well as Aziza village in the south, while adding that troops had reached the outskirts of Mayssar, a rebel bastion in southeast Aleppo. At the same time, the SOHR confirmed the military captured the Karm al-Qasr district, on the southeastern edge of Aleppo, and reported that residents of Mayssar, Marjeh and Enzarrat districts were fleeing their homes for "neighbourhoods controlled by regime forces because of the fighting".

During the month of January, government forces also pushed into the Old City district of Aleppo and captured the Farafra area.

On 2 February, the Al-Watan newspaper announced that the Army captured most of the eastern Karam al-Turab district of Aleppo.

On 16 February, government forces captured the village of Sheikh Najjar, south of the industrial zone, as well as Talet al-Ghali, on the eastern outskirts of Aleppo. On 19 February, rebels claimed to have recaptured Sheikh Najjar, while the SOHR stated it was unclear who controlled the area. The next day, the Army re-secured Sheikh Najjar and captured two strategic hills that overlook the eastern neighborhoods of Aleppo, al-Ghalia and Syriatel.

On 24 February, the Army made progress in the Sheikh Najjar industrial zone, with rebels sending reinforcements to the area. The military was attempting to capture strategic areas in Sheikh Najjar that overlook the outskirts of the Aleppo central prison, which had been under a rebel siege for over a year. The Army hoped to station artillery at those positions to help fend off attacks on the prison. The next day, the military captured the factory of the Zanoubia ceramic company in the southern al-Sheikh Sa'id district of Aleppo. Soldiers, NDF militiamen and Hezbollah fighters also captured new positions near Base 80, putting them one kilometer from the Tariq al-Bab district. The area they captured included the districts of Talat Barkat and al-Ard al-Hamra.

On 27 February, the military reportedly captured Brakat hill, reaching to the east of the al-Sakan al-Shababi area of Aleppo city.

On 2 March, government forces captured the Majbal al-Zeft area near the Aleppo central prison, as well as the Al-Khaledia neighborhood of Aleppo city. The next day, there were conflicting claims of the takeover of the Al-Majbal area with both the Army and the opposition claiming to be in control. The military also claimed to be on the verge of breaking the siege of the prison after capturing 60 percent of the industrial zone and surrounding the rebels in the area.

At this time, rebels attempted to halt the Army advance on Aleppo's outskirts by attacking government-held villages south of the city, and thus trying to block the Army supply route (Aleppo-Khanaser-Hama). However, military reinforcements arrived to reinforce these positions and the attempted rebel advance was stopped.

On 9 March, fighting was once again raging around Al-Majbal hill, near the central prison. By this point, government forces had captured a strategic hill, where they positioned artillery to bombard rebel positions around the prison.

=== Final Army push to the prison ===
In early May, government forces captured the Al-Majbal area and the Breij roundabout, thus taking control of the northeastern entrance to Aleppo. This also brought government forces close to the central prison. The Army also reached the al-Kindi Hospital.

Within a week, rebels made claims to have retaken several points in Bureij, amid the arrival of hundreds of rebel reinforcements from Idlib, Hama and Aleppo provinces. According to the SOHR, 21 rebel fighters and 30 pro-government fighters were killed in the clashes, in addition to three disabled Army tanks. However, other opposition sources denied the claim saying rebel forces had made no progress in the Bureij area. Despite this, rebels managed to retake the al-Majbal area at the cost of at least 27 fighters, while the Army suffered several casualties.

On 20 May, the Army captured the Sheikh Najjar power plant and Agop hill right next to it, which opened the way towards the central prison, bringing government troops to one kilometer from the prison complex. There were also reports that some troops had already arrived to reinforce the prison. After the capture of the hill, the military attacked the village of Hilan, which is the last rebel stronghold before the prison. The Army was also still engaged in Sector 2 of the industrial complex.

The next day, the military captured Hilan, as government forces had broken through on the road leading to the prison. At the same time, rebels blew up the Kindi hospital in fear it could be used for monitoring rebel supply routes if the advancing government troops managed to capture it. Soon after, Army tanks had reached and taken up positions at about 500 meters from the prison complex. The area was witnessing heavy artillery shelling, with government troops dropping at least 30 barrel bombs from military helicopters over the previous 24 hours, as rebel forces were fast retreating from the area due to the government's superior firepower. During the two days of fighting, at least 50 rebels were killed.

On 22 May, the Army had finally broken the siege of the prison as tanks and armored vehicles entered the complex. The Air Force dropped more than 100 barrel bombs during the final push to reach the prison. This put the north-east approach to Aleppo under the control of government forces.

By 25 May, the military was in control of Sector 1 of the industrial zone and had captured the town of Jbeileh next to the prison.

On 30 May, the SOHR reported almost 2,000 people had been killed in Aleppo by barrel bomb strikes since the start of January.

=== Sheikh Najjar captured ===
On 3 July, after an assault which included 20 airstrikes, government forces fully captured the industrial district. This left the Infantry Academy and the Handarat camp as the only two rebel-held areas the Army would need to capture to complete the siege of Aleppo, after three major rebel supply routes had been cut.

Days later, government reinforcements arrived, which included members of the elite Republican Guards and Hezbollah, and the military captured the villages of Kafr al-Saghir and Moqbila, advancing towards the Infantry Academy. Rebel reinforcements had also been dispatched to Aleppo, however, one brigade numbering 1,000 fighters that was supposedly sent from Idlib province to reinforce opposition forces in Aleppo city used the chance and defected to the rival extremist ISIS organisation.

The slow pace with which the Army advanced since the start of the operation was described as deliberate so the military could have time to consolidate control over captured territory. According to one diplomat, "They haven't lost any areas they have taken back. It is not a battle of back-and-forth."

=== Rebel counter-attacks repelled, continued Army advance ===
By mid-August, only three miles remained before the military could completely cut rebel supply lines into the city, after the opposition forces’ position deteriorated in the previous month following failed rebel counterattacks that attempted to dislodge government troops from the industrial zone. The rebels also attempted to capture the military academy in the western outskirts of the city, in an attempt to force government forces to reposition from the east to the west. However, the attack ended in catastrophe after the rebels were exposed to repeated air strikes, even at night, that made it impossible to move men and weapons freely.

Government forces had also captured two hills and three villages in the western Aleppo countryside, while there were competing claims over the town of Khan Tuman. On 18 August, the Army captured Khan Tuman hill.

Between 20 and 23 August, heavy fighting raged at the Handarat district, which was reportedly being besieged by government forces, while the military claimed to have captured the village of Jbeileh, which the rebels used to conduct attacks on the prison. Shortly after the capture of Jbeileh, the Army attacked the "cement factory", with expectations it would be captured within a few hours.

On 24 August, the military captured Mount Azzan, after forcing rebel forces to retreat to the south, while government troops advanced from Jbeileh to the west towards Al-Muslimiyyah and captured two neighborhoods in the village.

=== Battle for the Handarat area ===
On 3 October, following a two-month stalemate, the Army, supported by the NDF, Hezbollah, Al-Quds Brigades and Ba'ath Brigades, finally captured the village of Handarat and its hill, thus cutting off one of the two last rebel supply lines for opposition-held areas in Aleppo city. The Army quickly erected barriers on the road so it would be closed off. Government forces also captured the villages of al-Mudafah and Sifat and a four-way intersection west of Sifat. Later, the rebels counter-attacked in an attempt to recapture the hill. 45 rebels and 32 soldiers were killed during the day's fighting. The final supply route, via the Castello Road and al-Jandul roundabout, came under constant air-strikes and was monitored.

On 9 October, the Army secured the Handarat farms and the village of Babinnis, just south of the rebel-controlled infantry school.

On 13 October, the rebels made advances that could possibly cut off the supply roads to the Army-held Sifat, Handarat and Handarat base.

On 18 October, the Army captured the village of al-Jbayleh, the cement plant and the glass factory, north of the prison, ending the rebel's attempts to isolate the Army in Sifat and Handarat. The next day, the Army also captured the village of Al-Muslimiyya.

On 20 October, the military made further advances and captured the Halabi Farms (Mazra’a Halabi) and Tal Madafa, the highest hill in the province which is located north of Handarat.

In early November, the last remaining rebel supply route, the Castello Road, was within firing range of the Syrian Army and they were in position to close it off at any time, but were still leaving it open, possibly to give a chance to anyone who wanted to leave the city before they implemented the siege.

== See also ==
- Battle of Aleppo (2012–2016)
- Operation Rainbow (Syrian Civil War)
