= Aleppo offensive (November–December 2016) =

December 2016 battle in Aleppo

- Part of the Battle of Aleppo (Syrian Civil War) and the Russian military intervention in Syria
Date	15 November – 22 December 2016 (1 month and 1 week)
Location	Aleppo, Aleppo Governorate, Syria
Result	Syrian government and allied victory: Syrian Army and its allies regain control of all eastern and southern districts of Aleppo.; 130,000 civilians flee east Aleppo.; End of the Battle of Aleppo (2012–2016).

Belligerents
(Syria) Syrian Arab Republic; Russia; Iran Allied militias: Liwa al-Quds; Popular Mobilization Forces; Liwa Fatemiyoun; Liwa Zainebiyoun; Hezbollah; Ba'ath Brigades; SSNP Syrian Democratic Forces (from 27–28 November)	Fatah Halab (until 1 December); Jaysh Halab (since 1 December); Jabhat Fateh al-Sham; Jabhat Ansar al-Din

Commanders and leaders
Maj. Gen. Zaid Saleh (Head of Aleppo security committee); Maj. Gen. Suheil al-Hassan (Tiger Forces chief commander) (Russia) Alexander Zhuravlyov; Mohammad al-Saeed (Liwa Al-Quds chief commander); Col. Mohammad Rafi † (Liwa Al-Quds operations commander); Samer Rafi (Liwa Al-Quds field commander)	Abu Abdul Rahman Noor (WIA) (official leader of Jaysh Halab); Abu Bashir (Jaysh Halab commander) 'Umar Al-Hajj † (Harakat Nour al-Din al-Zenki top commander); Abu al-Hareth al-Halabi † (Ahrar al-Sham top commander); Farouq Abu Bakr (Ahrar al-Sham commander); Abu Abed ("Tough Battalion" commander); Suhaib (Jaysh al-Islam commander, deserted) 'Aziz Khantoumani † (Karm Al-Jabal Martyrs Battalion commander); Ahmad Bisan † (Karm Al-Jabal Martyrs Battalion commander); Abu Abdo Sheikh (POW) (Sham Legion commander)

Units involved
Syrian Armed Forces; Syrian Army; 4th Mechanized Division; Republican Guard; 102nd Brigade; 800th Regiment; Syrian Marines; Special Forces; Tiger Forces; Desert Hawks Brigade; 629th Battalion; National Defence Forces; Local Defence Forces; Baqir Brigade; Military Intelligence Directorate; Military Security Shield Forces; Forces of the Fighters of the Tribes; Syrian Air Force; Syrian Ministry of Interior; Syrian Special Mission Forces; Russian Armed Forces; Russian Air Force; Russian Navy; Russian Ground Forces; Special operations forces advisors; Popular Mobilization Forces; Harakat Hezbollah al-Nujaba; Ammar Yasser Brigade; Asa'ib Ahl al-Haq; Kata'ib al-Imam Ali; Harakat al-Abdal; Kata'ib Dir' al-Wilaya; (Iran) Iranian Armed Forces; IRGC; Hezbollah; Syrian Hezbollah units; Junud al-Mahdi; Imam al Hujja Regiment; Syrian Democratic Forces; YPG; YPJ; Army of Revolutionaries; Jabhat al-Akrad; (Syrian opposition) Northern Democratic Brigade	Jaysh Halab; Ahrar ash-Sham; Abu Amara Brigades; Jaysh al-Islam; Nour al-Din al-Zenki Movement; Army of Mujahideen; Sham Legion; Levant Front; Sultan Murad Division; 1st Regiment; Islamic Freedom Battalions; 16th Division remnants; Free Syrian Army; Fastaqim Union; Muntasir Billah Brigade; Jabhat Fatah al-Sham; "Tough Battalion"

Strength
6,000–25,000+ soldiers: 3,000 al-Nujaba fighters	8,000 fighters (before the offensive): Fastaqim Kama Umirt: 3,000 fighters; 900 fighters; 3,400–5,000 fighters (near the end of the offensive): 500 fighters

Casualties and losses
Syrian Army and allies: 153 killed ( 31, 10, 8, (Iran) 5), 200+ wounded Russian military: 3 killed 2 killed	400–450 killed, 340+ wounded, 2,200+ captured (per Russia)
- 614–990+ civilians killed (465 by government shelling and air-strikes, 149 by rebel shelling; per SOHR)

The Aleppo offensive (November–December 2016), code named Operation Dawn of Victory by government forces, was a successful military offensive launched by the Syrian Armed Forces and allied groups against rebel-held districts in Aleppo. The offensive came after the end of the moratorium on air strikes by Russia, and the Russian Armed Forces again conducted heavy air and cruise missile strikes against rebel positions throughout northwestern Syria. The offensive resulted in government forces taking control of all rebel-controlled parts of eastern and southern Aleppo, and the evacuation of the remaining rebel forces.

The offensive was described as a potential turning point in the Syrian Civil War.

Almost 1,200 people were killed during the operation, including more than 600 civilians, most of whom died in the rebel-held part of the city where the offensive took place, but at least 149 were also killed by rebel shelling of government-held parts of Aleppo and some died in rebel strikes on the enclave held by the Syrian Democratic Forces.

== Prelude ==
=== Russian Fleet intervention ===
==== Naval build up ====
On 15 October 2016, a Russian seven-ship Northern Fleet task force composed of the aircraft carrier Admiral Kuznetsov, the battlecruiser Pyotr Velikiy, two Udaloy-class destroyers, Severomorsk and Vice-Admiral Kulakov and a number of supply ships left Severomorsk for the Eastern Mediterranean to support Syrian government forces battling rebel troops in Aleppo. After sailing round Norway, Admiral Kuznetsov conducted live-fire exercises and flight operations off Shetland trailed by the Norwegian frigate HNoMS Fridtjof Nansen, the British frigate HMS Richmond and the destroyer HMS Duncan. Two Typhoon fighters scrambled from RAF Lossiemouth on the night of 17 October to intercept a Tupolev Tu 142 carrying out maritime surveillance north of Shetland ahead of the Russian battlegroup. The Russian fleet then passed through the English Channel on 21 October in a show of force, shadowed by the British destroyer HMS Dragon. Due to NATO pressure, the naval force was denied refuelling at Ceuta by the Spanish government. Admiral Kuznetsov eventually refuelled off North Africa on 26 October. The task force joined ten other Russian warships already in the theatre of operations, among them the frigate Admiral Grigorovich that had departed Sevastopol on 3 November. During the last stage of their sortie, the Admiral Kuznetzov group was shadowed by a Walrus-class Dutch submarine, according to Russian sources. The submarine was "chased away" by the destroyers Severomorsk and Vice-Admiral Kulakov.

==== Operations ====
On 15 November 2016, Admiral Grigorovich launched a salvo of Kalibr cruise missiles at rebel positions in the Idlib Governorate, rebel and Islamic State of Iraq and the Levant (ISIL) and Jabhat al-Nusra targets in the Homs Governorate, and reportedly rebel-held parts of Aleppo itself, something Russia denied. The attack was supported by P-800 Oniks missiles launched from a Russian coastal battery inside Syria. At the same time, Sukhoi Su-33s from Admiral Kuznetsov conducted airstrikes throughout northwestern and western Syria. The aircraft struck "ammunition depots, groups of terrorists and their training centers, as well as facilities being used to manufacture mass destruction means that are used against civilians" according to Russian Minister of Defence, Sergey Shoigu.

=== Syrian forces ===
The offensive on Aleppo was announced on the same day, with the start of heavy Syrian and Russian airstrikes. The Syrian Armed Forces and allied militias made "final preparations" for a large-scale assault into eastern Aleppo. while aircraft from the Syrian Air Force hit rural and suburban areas around the rebel-controlled sector. The city itself was later attacked by jets and helicopters with conventional and barrel bombs. The Syrian Command assembled a ground force composed of Syrian special troops, Hezbollah militias and allied Iraqi paramilitaries.

== The offensive ==
=== Initial fighting and Army approach to Hanano ===
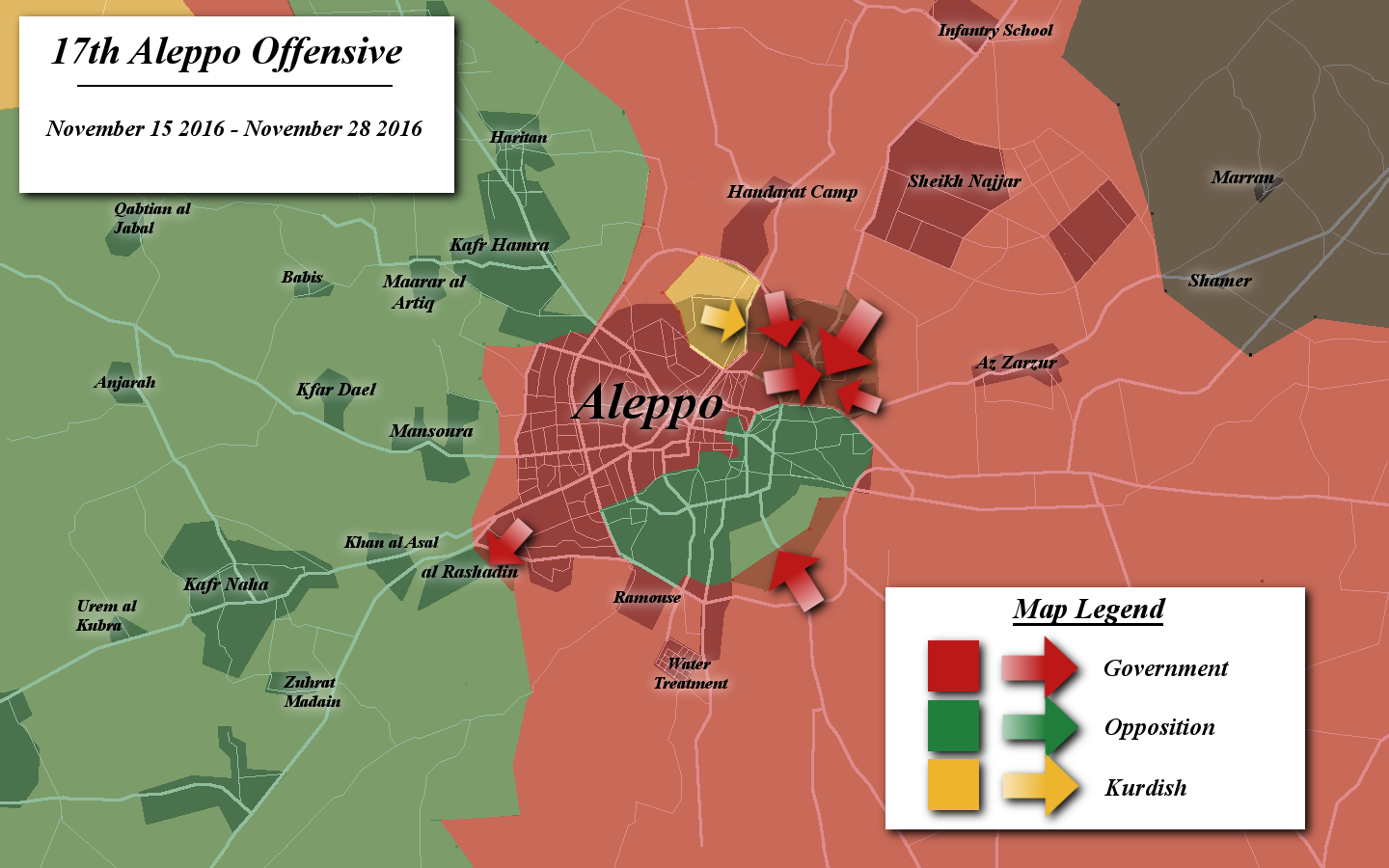
Army and allies advances in Aleppo between 15 and 28 November 2016

On 16 November the Syrian Army, supported by Russian airstrikes, stormed the Rashidun and Aqrab districts in southwestern Aleppo, but were repelled by the rebels. Amid exchanges of shelling by both sides, clashes renewed in the Jamiat al-Zahra district of western Aleppo.

On 19 November, after heavy bombardment of eastern Aleppo, the Syrian Army attempted to advance in the Sheikh Saeed district in the southeast but were again repelled by the rebels. Meanwhile, pro-government forces advanced in the northeast. The Army seized the southern and central parts of the Bustan Al-Basha district, leaving them in control of 75 percent of the area. In addition, in the evening, after two days of Syrian and Russian airstrikes, the Tiger Forces took control of the strategic Zouhor hill which overlooks the Hanano district and most of rebel-controlled east Aleppo. At the same time, the Army advanced in the southwestern Aleppo district of Aqrab. The Tiger Forces also advanced southwest from the Zouhor hill into the old Sheikh Najjar factories, and seized most of them after intense clashes.

The next day, the Army managed to progress to the entrance of the Hanano district. In the evening, a rebel counter-attack against Zouhor hill and the factories area was launched and eventually repelled. By the end of the day, the Army managed to enter the Hanano district. On 21 November, government advanced in the old Sheikh Najjar factories, the Hanano housings and the nearby Islamic cemetery, while a second Army attack in 48 hours was launched on the southern Sheikh Saeed District. Although the rebels repelled this attack as well, they reportedly suffered heavy casualties.

=== Capture of Hanano ===
As of 22 November, the military was in control of around a third of Hanano and by the next day half of the district. According to the pro-opposition activist group the SOHR, if the Army managed to seize Hanano, they would be able to cut off the northern part of the rebel-held Aleppo from the rest of the opposition-held districts.

On 24 November, the Army pushed deep into the Hanano district, capturing more than half a dozen key buildings. The aim of the advance was to bisect the rebel-held part of Aleppo. Heavy and systematic government bombardment inflicted heavy rebel casualties. By the next day, government forces were in control of large parts of Hanano. Government forces also took control of large parts of the northeastern 'Ard Al-Hamra and southern Sheikh Lutfi districts, as well as the southern Hill 420 (Police Hill).

On 26 November, government troops were in control of Hanano, which was the first district of the city that was taken by the rebels in 2012, and represented about a quarter of the remaining rebel-held part of the city. Government forces also made attempts to advance in the Ard Al-Hamra and Jabal Badro District, south of Hanano. Following the capture of Hanano, 400–600 civilians left the rebel-held part of Aleppo.

=== Northeastern rebel collapse ===
On 27 November, government forces made major advances after a swift collapse of the rebel defenses, capturing the Jabal-Badro, Ard Al-Hamra and Ba'ibdeen districts, while also seizing parts of the Sakhour district, namely the Al-Sakhour Bridge. Soon after, the Army took control of the northern Jandoul Factories and secured the Ayn Al-Tal district, as well as large parts of the Hallak Fuqani and Hallak Tahtani districts. Due to these advances, the rebels were in a massive retreat, also abandoning the Bustan Al-Basha district and parts of Haydariyah, and withdrawing to southern Aleppo through the Sakhour district, which if captured would split the rebel-held part of the city in two. At this point, less than a kilometer was separating government troops advancing in east Aleppo from those in the center of the city.

The collapse of the rebel frontlines was attributed to the heavy volume of bombardments, the intensity of the fighting, the number of dead and wounded, and the lack of working hospitals. Hundreds of civilians attempted to capitalize on the rebel collapse, with the number of evacuated civilians increasing to nearly 10,000 during the day.

In the evening, only 500 meters were separating the military from closing off the gap between the northeastern and the southeastern parts of the city. By this point, the remaining distance had already come under Army fire control. In addition, the Army completed its control of Hallak Al-Fukani, Hallak Al-Tahtani and Bustan Al-Basha, with Kurdish support, while the northeastern Inzarat district had also been seized. At least 36 rebels surrendered to the Army during their advances, while a number of them had reportedly defected to the Kurdish-led SDF.

As of 28 November, the entire northeastern part of Aleppo had fallen. Early in the day, the Army took control of Haydariyah. Two hours later, government forces also seized Sakhour, leaving the rebel-held districts of Sheikh Kheder and Sheikh Fares surrounded. Soon after, Sheikh Khider was also taken by the Army, along with parts of Sheikh Fares. The rest of Sheikh Fares was seized by Kurdish forces, who were confirmed to be in control of parts of Hallak, Bustan Al-Basha, Ba'ibdeen and Ayn Al-Tal as well after advancing from the northern Kurdish-controlled Sheikh Maqsood district. The overall situation was described to be "the biggest defeat for the opposition in Aleppo since 2012", with a four-year stalemate in the city being broken.

On 4 December, residents started returning to Hanano.

=== Syrian Army push into the southeast and capture of Old Aleppo ===
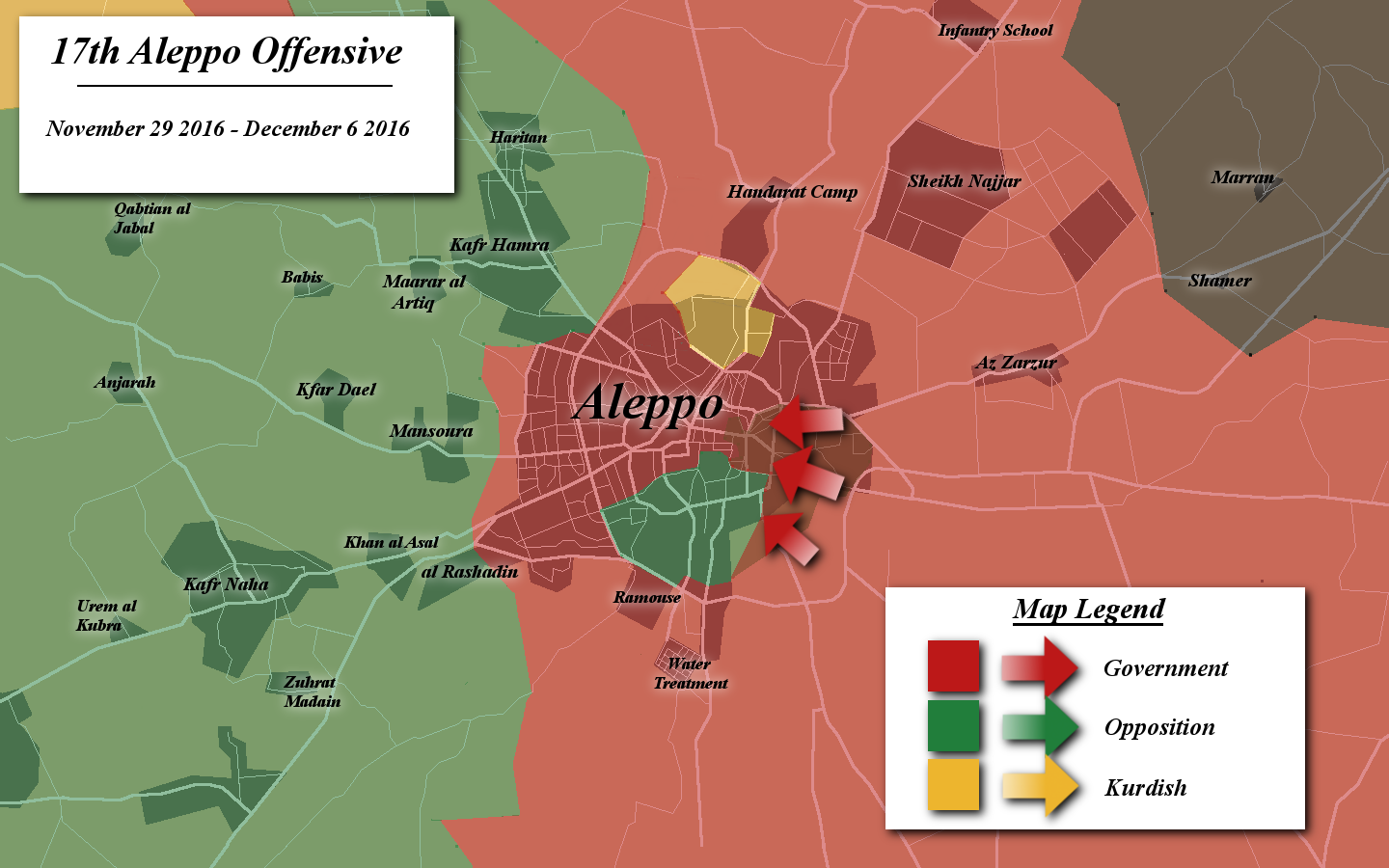
Army and allies advances in Aleppo between 29 November and 6 December 2016

Following the rebel collapse in the northeast, the Army made its first advance into the southeastern Tariq al-Bab (al-Helwania) district. On 28 November, they captured the Talet Barakat and Scientific Research Housing areas, south of Jabal Badro, and advanced into the Ma'saraniyah Youth housing.

On 29 November, the Army seized large parts of the southeastern al-Jazmati and al-Ma'saraniyah neighborhoods, in order to secure the Aleppo International Airport and its highway. The next day, the Army and pro-government Iraqi militias seized most of the Sheikh Saeed district in the southern part of the city. After this, they captured several building blocks in the exposed side of the Sukkari district. During these advances, the Army also cleared the Sadkop and Old Ramouseh areas, south of Sheikh Saeed. Government forces also again advanced in the Ma'saraniyah Youth housing area, and reportedly capturing it. On 1 December, the rebels were able to regain almost all of Sheikh Saeed district in a counter-attack. Government troops managed to retain control of the southern section of the district. They also recaptured some positions in the Ma'saraniyah Youth housing area.

As of 2 December, fighting continued in Sheikh Saeed, with the Army in control of 30% of the district. During the day, they once again advanced in the area. Meanwhile, the Army launched a major assault in the southeastern neighborhoods of Aleppo, capturing two districts, Tariq al-Bab and Karm al-Trab. They also took control of a large part of the al-Jazmati district. With these advances, government forces secured the airport road and were in control of 60% of the previously rebel-held part of Aleppo. Overall, the Army pushed one kilometer into rebel territory in the city. Around 01:00, during the day's clashes, a Syrian Air Force Aero L-39 Albatros was shot down by rebel fire and crashed in the central part of the city, with both pilots killed.

On 3 December, government forces completed their control of al-Jazmati and made a push into Mayssar. At this point, Russia sought a full rebel withdrawal from Aleppo. The rebels stated they would not surrender Aleppo.

The next day, the Army made advances in the Mayssar district, after capturing the al-Helwaniyah and al-Jazmati roundabouts. At this point, two kilometers were separating the advancing Army units from the government-held Citadel of Aleppo. Later in the day, government troops captured Mayssar, as well as the Dahret Awwad district. The Army then continued to converge on Aleppo's Old City, securing the al-Qaterrji and al-Tahhan districts, and advancing into Qadi Askar. They also captured the Eye Hospital and came within 500–1,000 meters of the Citadel and isolating the remaining districts northeast of it. Government troops also advanced at the al-Sha'ar district, with some rebels already withdrawing in anticipation of its fall. Subsequently, that night, the Army made more advances in Sha'ar. Meanwhile, Fatah al-Sham fighters along with their allies raided a warehouse containing weapons, food, and gas. The warehouse was guarded by Jaysh al-Islam and the guards, including a commander, were detained. This caused dissatisfaction among the civilian population in rebel-held areas amid poor living conditions and a lack of food and supplies. The Fatah al-Sham fighters also reportedly arrested 150 Jaysh al-Islam fighters under the charges they were going to surrender to the advancing government forces.

On 5 December, the Army captured the Qadi Askar district, leaving Sha'ar effectively encircled. Government forces also seized several parts of Sha'ar. According to a rebel official, they considered Sha'ar and nearby Karm al-Jabal as already fallen. Later that day, the rebels launched a large counter-attack in an attempt to recapture the territory they had lost in the previous days. Despite initial claims that they had retaken large parts of Mayssar, the counter-attack was eventually repelled. Subsequently, the Army restarted its push around the Citadel.

On 6 December, the Army was closing in on Sha'ar, after already taking control of one third of the district, and it was on the brink of falling. Later that day, they had taken full control of Sha'ar, as well as four other nearby districts. This left more than 70 percent of formerly rebel-held Aleppo under government control. A large-scale rebel withdrawal from the northern districts of their pocket was started. Concurrently, the Army captured parts of the southern Marjeh and Sheikh Lutfi districts. At Sheikh Lutfi, they seized a hill that overlooks large parts of the district. In the evening, it was reported five buses full of rebels left the rebel-held part of southeastern Aleppo, while the Army pushed into Aleppo's Old City. By the end of the day, Old Aleppo had been taken after the rebels retreated from its three neighborhoods. Sheikh Lufti was also seized. With these advances, the Army had taken control of the entire area around the Aleppo Citadel. One of the areas taken in Old Aleppo was the Umayyad Mosque, the largest and one of the oldest mosques in the city.

=== Final stage ===
==== Rebels on the brink ====
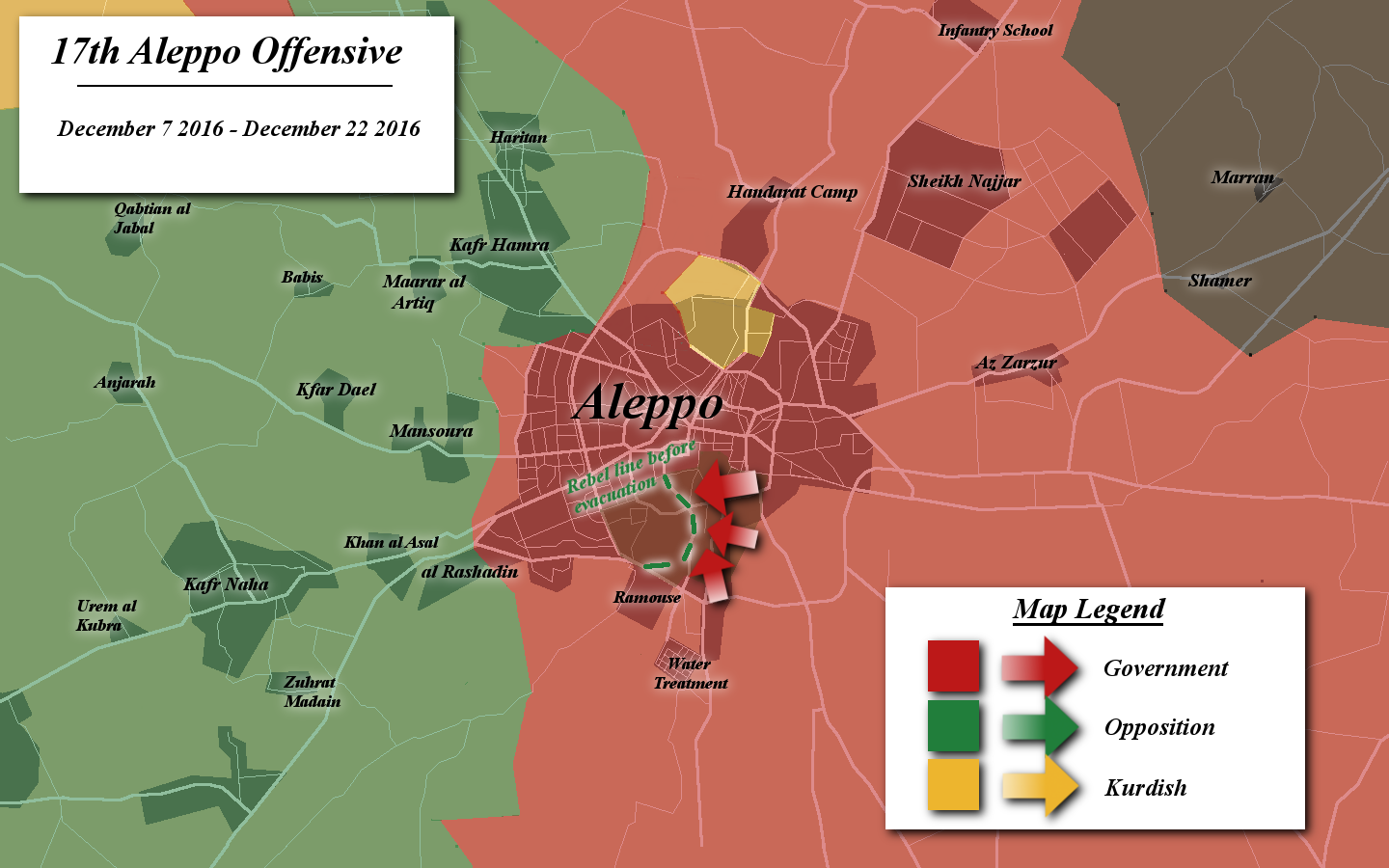
Map of the final government push and rebel line before the evacuation

On 7 December, the Army continued their large-scale offensive, securing Sheikh Lutfi, while also capturing the Marjah, Bab Al-Nayrab, Maadi and Salheen districts. The next day, the military started its last phase of the offensive, with a new assault on Sheikh Saeed, while also preparing to storm the Sukkari district. During the day, they advanced in the Sheikh Saeed area.

At the end of 8 December, the Syrian Army halted its offensive in order to evacuate some 8,000 civilians from the area. Russian officials reported 10,500 had been evacuated overall, while the United Nations (UN) stated the rebels were stopping people from leaving. Still, despite the announced humanitarian pause, the next day, there were conflicting reports, with some stating fighting was continuing, while others that the government offensive resumed after a short break. On 10 December, Russian officials reported up to 50,000 people had been evacuated over the previous two days, while they also claimed more than 1,200 rebels had surrendered. One more possible reason for the halt in the Army's advance was reported to be the concurrent ISIL offensive against Palmyra, which diverted troops away from Aleppo to defend the city.

On 11 December 2016, Syrian government forces captured all or most of three districts, while also advancing in two others. The Army's assault was accompanied by heavy shelling and air raids, with explosions at a rate of more than one a minute. Airstrikes hit the last remaining bridge that linked eastern and western Aleppo. At this point, the rebels had proposed a US-Russian negotiated deal to leave the city to Idlib or toward the border with Turkey.

On 12 December, government forces captured the southern Sheikh Saeed district, which led to a large-scale collapse of the rebel frontline at the Fardous district, which was also taken, as well as its surroundings. Sheikh Saeed contained the rebels' last remaining mill and grains warehouse. Later in the day, the rebels fully retreated to the west side of the Queiq River and started establishing a new frontline. Still, many rebels surrendered, with the Russian Defence Ministry putting the number at 728. During a lull in the shelling in the morning hours, hundreds and thousands of civilians fled across the frontlines into government-held parts of Aleppo, while the remaining rebel-held parts were becoming overcrowded with hundreds of rebel fighters and thousands of civilians who were finding sanctuary in half-destroyed buildings. Overall, the Army secured nine districts during the day, and were attempting to advance into the remaining patch of rebel territory which consisted of three neighborhoods. The rebels claimed over 180 people were executed by government forces in the areas they had seized. That night, rebels from Fatah Halab and Jaysh al-Fatah accepted the terms of surrender, under which they would be transferred to the Anadan plains, while street celebrations erupted in Aleppo after reports of the Syrian Army's declared victory. Still, fighting against remaining pockets of rebel resistance continued into the early hours of 13 December.

On 13 December, the remaining rebel-held areas east of the Queiq River were cleared, with the rebels squeezed into a small pocket of approximately 3.5 square kilometers to the west of it. The UN stated it had reliable evidence that in four areas 82 civilians were executed by pro-government forces, while the UN children's agency cited a doctor that a building housing more than 100 unaccompanied children was under heavy attack. UN humanitarian advisor Jan Egeland concluded that all the governments, such as those of Russia, Syria, and Iran, who are supplying forces, military or militia, with weaponry, are directly responsible for protecting the lives of civilians.

==== Reported massacre by pro-government forces ====
After the capture of rebel-held parts of Aleppo by the Syrian Army, the Office of the United Nations High Commissioner for Human Rights, led by Prince Zeid bin Ra'ad of Jordan, said it received "credible reports" that forces loyal to the government were "gunning down civilians" and killing residents in their homes in four different neighborhoods in Aleppo city. The UN's humanitarian adviser on Syria, Jan Egeland, named an unspecified pro-government Iraqi Shia militia as being responsible for the massacre.

Amnesty International, commenting on the UN reports, described the killings as war crimes and stated: "Amnesty International has previously highlighted the Syrian government's widespread and systematic use of enforced disappearance to attack the civilian population in what has amounted to crimes against humanity. It is crucial that independent monitors are deployed to prevent further enforced disappearances, torture and other ill-treatment". The deputy director of research for Amnesty International in Beirut also said: "The reports that civilians, including children, are being massacred in cold blood in their homes by Syrian government forces are deeply shocking but not unexpected given their conduct to date. Such extrajudicial executions would amount to war crimes."

Syrian Brigadier General Samir Suleiman responded: "These are false claims. The Arab Syrian army can never do this and we have never done it in our army's history."

Head of the Main Operations Department of Russia's General Staff Lieutenant-General Sergei Rudskoi commented that a "new information campaign" disseminated by "some Western politicians" that "[Aleppo's] streets are full of corpses while thousands of residents are still hiding in basements" is "a blatant lie". He stated that officers of Russia's Center for the Reconciliation of the Warring Sides in Syria and representatives of the International Committee of the Red Cross who entered together with Syrian soldiers "found no corpses there", and neither were any seen by the "unmanned aerial vehicles [that] were broadcasting in real time to the entire world". He said that the accusations were based on "information from social networks and militants' websites".

==== Ceasefires and evacuation ====
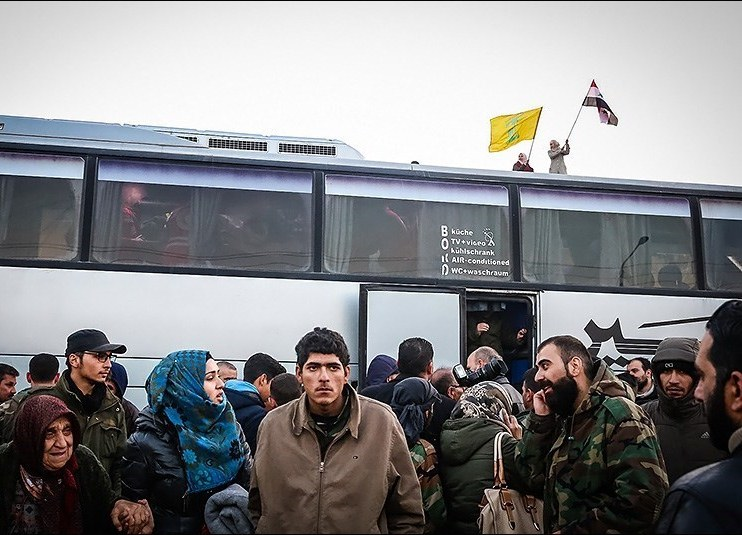
Arrival of residents of Al-Fu'ah and Kfrya to Aleppo after its capture by the Syrian Army

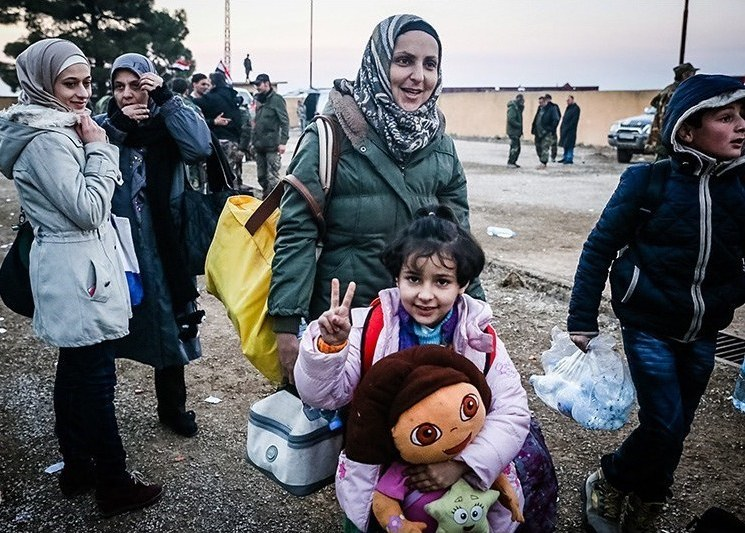

A ceasefire agreement sponsored by Russia and Turkey was reached later on 13 December, under which the rebels were supposed to withdraw. Under the terms, a cessation of bombardment on rebel-held areas was implemented, while ground clashes were to cease in the evening, after which the first civilian evacuations would take place. All remaining rebels, along with their family members, were then to be evacuated to Aleppo's western outskirts in the early hours of 14 December, after which they would continue to the Idlib Governorate. In the evening, Vitaly Churkin, Permanent Representative of Russia to the United Nations, and Alfarouq, the leader of Ahrar al-Sham, both confirmed all military actions had ceased. Churkin reported the Syrian Army was in complete control of the city, while Alfarouq cautioned the rebels to be prepared in case of any breach.

The evacuation was however delayed for unknown reasons and none of the evacuation buses were moving into the eastern districts at the scheduled time. Some entered briefly the previous night, but returned empty. A pro-government source reported that sporadic gunfire from rebel areas prior to the scheduled departure caused many soldiers to worry that the agreement might fail and a military officer stated that the evacuation of rebels and civilians had been postponed indefinitely due to poor communication and internal disputes among the rebels. In contrast, a rebel official blamed pro-government Shi'ite militias of obstructing the evacuation. Iran reportedly wanted the simultaneous evacuation of wounded from two villages besieged by the rebels in Idlib province, which was rejected by the rebels. A pro-opposition station stated that the evacuation might be delayed till the next day. But air strikes, shelling and ground clashes soon erupted, leaving the ceasefire broken. The Russian military accused the rebels of breaking the ceasefire, stating that although the Army had observed it, the rebels fired at a convoy meant for evacuation, while Turkish President Recep Tayyip Erdoğan accused the Syrian Army of breaking it. The Syrian Observatory for Human Rights stated that the presence of 250 non-Syrian rebels whom the Syrian government wanted to detain for interrogation, was also a reason behind the deal breaking down.

Subsequently, rebel territory had reportedly shrunk to only 2.5 km^{2}, after the Army crossed the river and captured at least half of the Sukkari district. During the fighting, the rebels launched an attack against pro-government forces using suicide car bombs. In the evening, a new ceasefire deal was reached, with evacuations scheduled to start early on 15 December, from both Aleppo and the villages of Foua and Kafriya besieged by the rebels. Two rebel and one pro-government official confirmed the ceasefire and the evacuation from Aleppo, but there were discrepancies in who would be evacuated from the villages, with the rebels stating it would only be the wounded, while the pro-government official stated that about 15,000 people would be transferred out. However, later, Hezbollah's media unit denied these reports, stating that negotiations were seeing big complications due to tension and operations on the front lines.

The ceasefire was revived during the early hours of 15 December, and the rebels would reportedly be taken to Khan Tuman. The Russian Ministry of Defence stated that Russian soldiers would lead the evacuation of rebels with the Syrian government guaranteeing their safety, while the International Committee of the Red Cross would assist in transporting the wounded rebels. UN's humanitarian adviser in Syria, Jan Egeland stated the sick and wounded including orphans would be evacuated first, followed by vulnerable people and then the rebels.

Soon, the evacuation had begun, and around noon, the first wave of evacuees reached rebel-held territory to the west of Aleppo. Nearly 1,000 people, including 300 children and 28 wounded people, were evacuated in the first convoy. Fighters from Jabhat Fatah al-Sham and their prisoners were reportedly the first to leave. During the evacuation, it was reported that pro-government militias had shot at the ambulances carrying the civilians as they left eastern Aleppo. According to one report, one person was killed and four injured, while another said only three people were injured. Syrian state television reported that the convoy also evacuated rebel fighters, while according to the rebels' chief negotiator, the fighters would be evacuated after the first or second convoy. Meanwhile, evacuations had also reportedly begun in Foua and Kafriya. As the withdrawal was getting underway, the rebels burned their command centers, warehouses and vehicles, while Senior Russian general Viktor Poznikhir stated that the Syrian Army had almost finished its operations in Aleppo. Later in the day, the second and third convoy had left, with the second evacuating 1,198 people. The U.N. envoy for Syria Staffan de Mistura stated that around 50,000 people were still to be evacuated, of which 40,000 civilians would go to West Aleppo, while the remaining 10,000 consisting of 1,500–5,000 rebels and their families would be taken to Idlib.

By the morning of 16 December, according to SOHR, 8,500 people overall had been evacuated, including some 3,000 fighters and 360 wounded, in nine convoys. The tenth convoy had also left. According to rebel officials, the number of evacuees was much lower, with no rebels having left. The Red Cross put the figure at 10,000. Later during the day, the evacuation was again suspended, with the Syrian government blaming the rebels for breaking the deal. Reports said it was suspended because of the rebels refusing to allow the evacuation of the wounded from Foua and Kafriya, which prompted protesters to block the road being used for the evacuation in Aleppo, demanding the evacuation from the two villages. Another report stated it was suspended because of rebels trying to leave with captives and smuggle out weapons. The rebels denied these reports, accusing pro-government militias of blocking the road being used for evacuation and firing on the vehicles. The tenth convoy carrying civilians was turned back towards east Aleppo. In retaliation for the militia attack on the tenth convoy, two rebels attacked government positions and were killed. Later, heavy fighting had resumed, with government forces reportedly advancing in two districts. Russia's Ministry of Defence meanwhile claimed that the Syrian Army had completed the operation to capture Aleppo and were eliminating the last pockets of resistance. It later also claimed that the evacuation was complete, with all civilians and 3,400 rebels who made the bulk of the rebels' fighting force being evacuated.

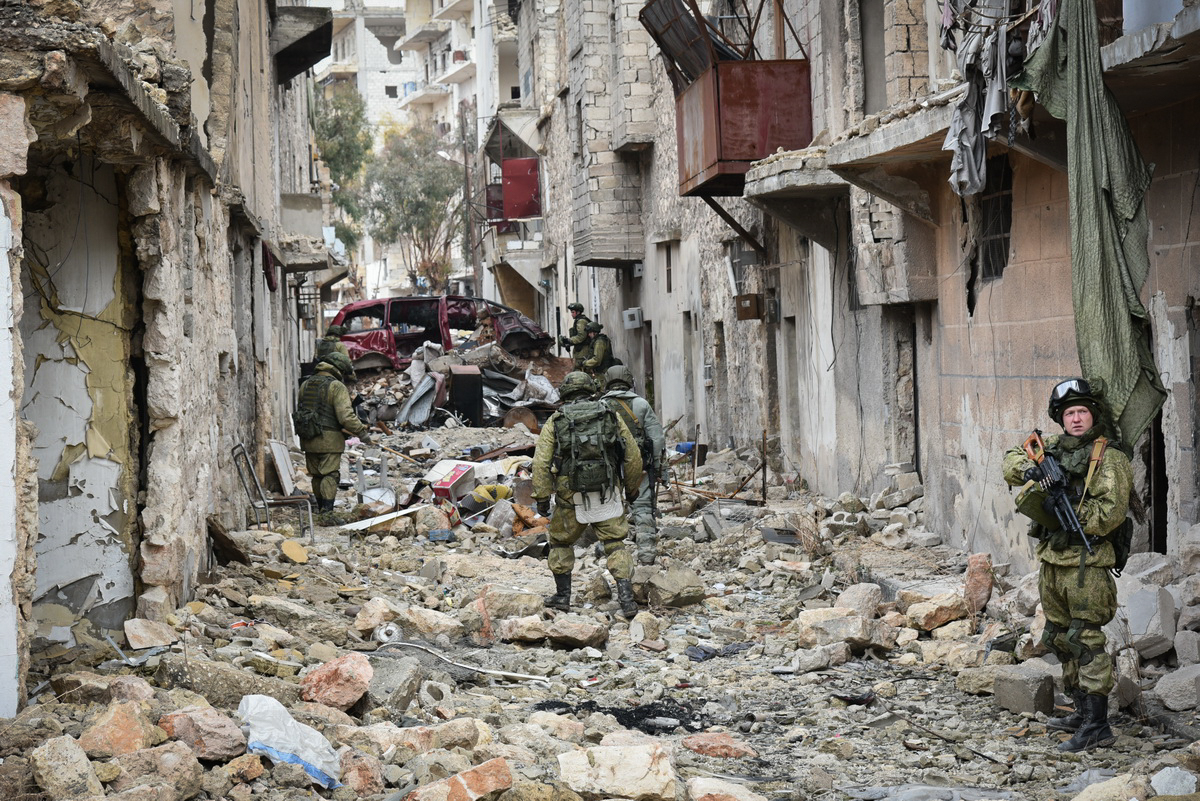
Russian sappers in Aleppo, 23 December 2016

Another deal was reached on 18 December, which also allowed evacuation from Madaya and Al-Zabadani. The evacuation resumed later in the day. It was later suspended again due to the attack on six buses en route to Foua and Kafriya, however resumed again later with a convoy carrying civilians being allowed to leave. The United Nations Security Council voted on 19 December, to monitor the evacuation and report the condition of civilians. The Red Cross stated that 15,000 people were evacuated by the end of the day, bringing the total to 25,000. However, SOHR disputed the ICRC figure and stated that by 20 December, 16,200 had been evacuated, including several thousand rebels, while between 2,000 and 3,000 still remained. The Syrian Army warned the rebels on 20 December that it will enter the territory held by them later in the day and told them all to leave east Aleppo. The evacuation again stalled later in the day, but resumed the following day. SOHR later stated that the last batch of evacuees had left and Syrian Army had taken control of Aleppo city. A UN and a rebel official however stated that evacuations were still ongoing. Over 34,000 people including more than 4,000 rebels were evacuated by morning of 22 December according to a statement made by the Red Cross. The Syrian Army later announced that it had retaken complete control of the city after the last rebel fighters were evacuated. A rebel official also stated that the evacuation was complete. The Red Cross later confirmed that the evacuation of all civilians and rebels was complete.

In the days following the evacuation, 63 soldiers and pro-government militiamen were killed by booby traps left by the retreating rebels in the former rebel-held part of Aleppo.

==== Reported massacre by rebel forces ====
The Syrian Army accused the jihadist rebels of Fatah Halab and Jabhat Fateh al-Sham of carrying out a massacre prior to leaving the last east Aleppo neighborhoods. Over 100 Syrian Army POWs, mostly young men between the ages of 18 and 25, were reportedly summarily executed by the rebels prior to their departure from the Sukkari and Bustan Al-Qasr districts of east Aleppo, according to the Syrian Army. The soldiers were said to have been captured during the four-year battle for Aleppo City. However, the pro-opposition activist group the SOHR denied the Army's allegation and stated the dozens of bodies that were found belonged to soldiers who were killed during fighting in the southern outskirts of the city.

The Army's High Command demanded the release of these soldiers before the rebels departed from east Aleppo; however, the latter denied having any hostages. According to the pro-government Al-Masdar News, it was initially said that Jabhat Fateh Al-Sham (formerly Jabhat Al-Nusra) were behind the alleged massacre in east Aleppo; however, it was later said to be Ahrar Al-Sham and Harakat Nouriddeen Al-Zinki who were responsible.

== International reactions ==
- United Nations - Jens Laerke, a spokesman for the United Nations office coordinating emergency relief, called the events "a complete meltdown of humanity".
- United States - Samantha Power, U.S. Ambassador to the United Nations at the time, placed blame on the Syrian government, Russia, and Iran for the attack, calling it "modern evil."
- Yemen - the Houthi prime minister in Sanaa, in a telephone conversation with the Prime Minister of Syria, congratulated Aleppo freedom and expressed hope that soon the complete liberation of Iraq and Yemen would be met.
- Iran - the Iranian defense minister congratulated his Syrian counterpart on the "full liberation of Aleppo from Takfiri terrorists". The Iranian President also congratulated Bashar al-Assad on the occasion.
- Russia - the spokesperson for the Russian defense ministry, Major General Igor Konashenkov, declared that "the operation of the Russian Center for Reconciliation has shown that what is necessary for moving forward for reconciliation in Syria is the desire to negotiate with all parties of the conflict directly 'on the ground', with the exception of terrorist groups".
- Algeria - Algerian Foreign Minister, Ramtane Lamamra, on the sidelines of the conference of peace and security in Africa, stated that Syrian government victories in Aleppo are "regaining supremacy and hegemony over the city and defeating terrorism".

== Aftermath and assessments ==
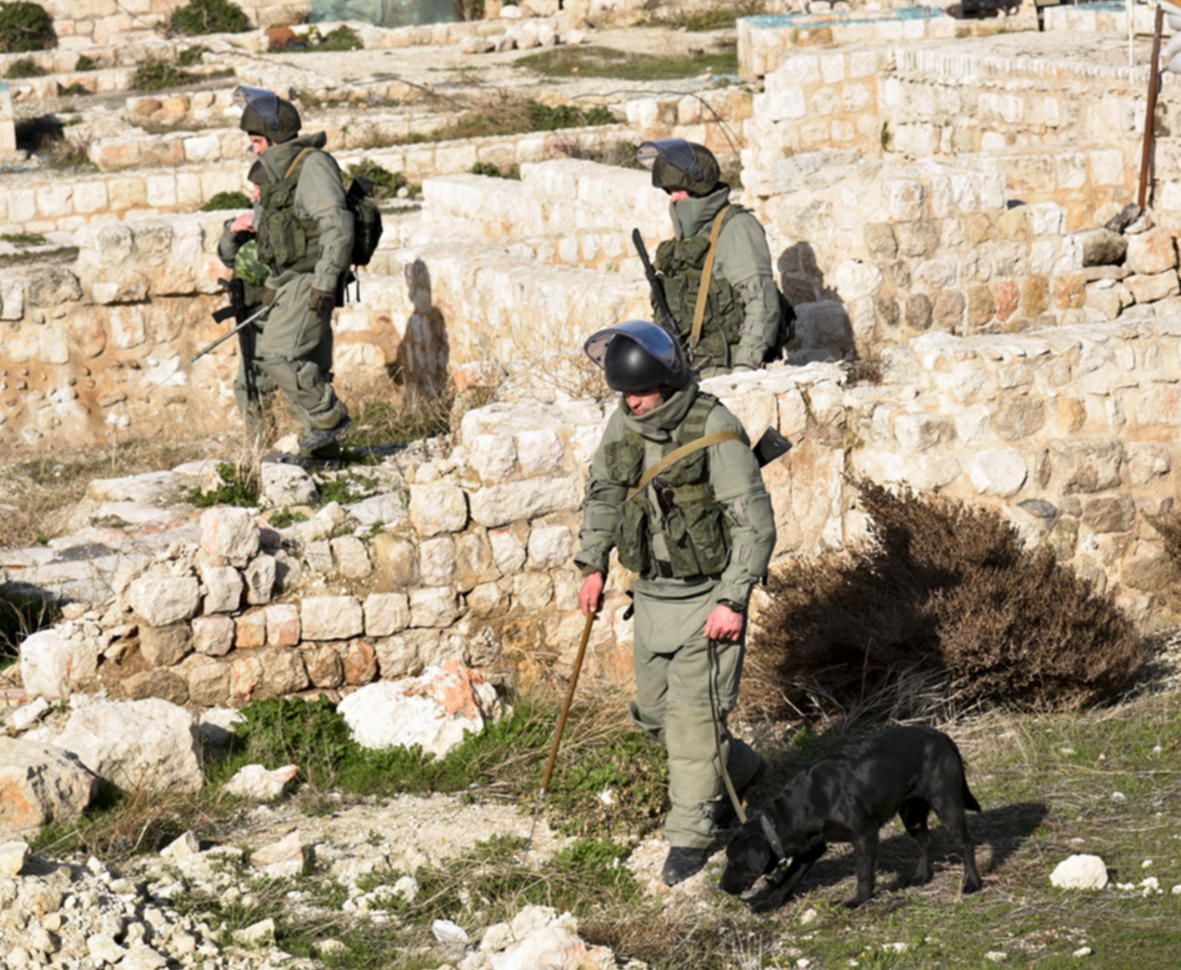
Russian sappers conducting a demining operation inside the Aleppo citadel, January 2017

President Bashar al-Assad stated that the victory in Aleppo not only belonged to the Syrian army, but was also a victory for Syria's allies, Russia and Iran. He also said that the victory was a "basic step on the road to ending terrorism in the whole of Syrian territory and creating the right circumstances for a solution to end the war".

Some commentators also remarked that whilst the victory in Aleppo was a sure sign of growing Russian influence, Iran was believed to be the greatest beneficiary of the battle's outcome. The Syrian Army's next goal was thought to possibly be the retaking of the whole Aleppo Province.

== See also ==
- 2016 Aleppo summer campaign
  - Aleppo offensive (June–July 2016)
  - Aleppo offensive (July–August 2016)
  - Aleppo offensive (August–September 2016)
- Aleppo offensive (September–October 2016)
- Aleppo offensive (October–November 2016)
- Palmyra offensive (December 2016), simultaneous ISIL offensive
