= East Aleppo offensive (2015–2016) =

Military operation

- Part of the Syrian Civil War and the Russian military intervention in the Syrian Civil War
- Map of the frontline changes in the Aleppo Province from 1–22 February 2016 Syrian Army control Syrian Opposition control SDF control Islamic State of Iraq and the Levant control
Date	18 November 2015 – 21 February 2016 (3 months and 3 days)
Location	Eastern Aleppo Governorate, Syria
Result	Decisive Syrian Army victory: The Syrian Army advances east, north, and west of the Kuweires airbase, capturing 61 villages and the Aleppo Thermal Power Plant, and clearing 40 kilometers of highway

Belligerents
(Syria) Syrian Arab Republic; Iran; Hezbollah Air strikes: Russia: Aerospace Forces	Islamic State

Commanders and leaders
Maj. Gen. Qasem Soleimani (Chief strategist); Gen. Suhayl al-Hasan (Tiger Forces commander) (Russia) Viktor Bondarev; Mustafa Badreddine	(Islamic State) Umar Al-Absi (Killed after the offensive)

Units involved
Syrian Armed Forces; Syrian Arab Army; Tiger Forces; Cheetah Forces; Cheetah Forces Team 3; Suqur al-Sahara; Syrian Arab Air Force; National Defence Forces; Ba'ath Brigades; Iranian Armed Forces; IRGC; Quds Force; IRGC Ground Forces; Basij; (Iraq) Iranian-backed Iraqi militias; Russian Armed Forces; Naval Infantry advisors; Aerospace Forces; Sukhoi Su-25SMs	(Islamic State) Military of ISIL

Strength
Unknown	800+ militants (on 20 Feb. 2016)

Casualties and losses
35+ soldiers killed, dozens wounded	190+ killed

Following the Syrian Arab Army's successful Kuweires offensive, during the Syrian Civil War, which ended with the securing of the Kuweires Military Airbase on 16 November 2015, the Syrian Army launched a new offensive in the eastern countryside of the Aleppo Governorate, with the aim of expanding the buffer zone around the airbase and disrupting ISIL supply lines.

== The offensive ==
=== Expansion around the Kuweires Airbase ===
Between 18 and 19 November, Syrian government forces captured the village of Jamayliyah, the Sheikh Ahmad Train Station, the Sheikh Ahmad Production Facility and the hilltop of Tal Humaymah, positioning themselves only 8 km away from ISIL's long-time stronghold of Dayr Hafir.

Between 27 November and 7 December, Syrian government forces captured four villages near the Kuweires air base. In late December, they continued their advances by seizing five more villages and a hill north of the Kuweires Airbase, with Najjarah being taken on the last day of 2015.

On 10 January 2016, Syrian government forces captured the village of Ayishah, and two days later another four nearby, bringing them only a few kilometers away from the southern perimeter of the city of Al-Bab.

Between 13 and 15 January, Syrian government troops captured seven more villages on the road between Al-Bab and the Kuweiris air base. A subsequent ISIL counterattack recaptured one of them (Aran).

=== The push westwards ===
On 23 January, the Syrian Army launched a full attack west of Kuweires, with the intention of linking up with government-held territory at the Sheikh Najjar Industrial District of Aleppo city. By 3 February, Syrian government forces had captured 11 villages west and northwest of the base, and were 13 kilometers from Sheikh Najjar. During this time, on 28 January, ISIL conducted a counterattack against the villages they lost during the previous days. The subsequent fighting left 20 Syrian soldiers and 14 ISIL militants dead. One of the main objectives during the military's assault was the Aleppo Thermal Power Plant. On 31 January, the Army cut ISIL's supply lines to the plant and fighting raged on its perimeter.

On 3 February, the Tiger Forces along with the NDF, Desert Hawks Brigade and Ba'ath Brigades captured Al-Si'in. In the evening of 3 February, Syrian government forces stormed the village of Tayyibah. Soon afterwards, ISIL reportedly started to withdraw from the village, while fighting still continued in Tayyibah. Meanwhile, Syrian government troops bypassed the Aleppo Thermal Power Plant, due to dozens of improvised traps, mines, and highly entrenched ISIL fighters in its vicinity.

On 7 February, ISIL recaptured two villages, while Syrian government forces captured another village and a hill, bringing them to within 7 kilometers of Sheikh Najjar and closing the ISIL pocket. An attempted ISIL counterattack against the hill left 11 militants dead.

On 13 February, the Syrian Army recaptured Jubb al Kalb village, less than one week after losing it to an ISIL counterattack. The following day, the Syrian Army captured four villages, including Tayyibah (300 meters from the Power Plant) and Barlehiyah (7 kilometers from government-held territory to the west).

On 18 February, the Syrian Army seized Al-Si'in once again, as well as Jubb Al-Ghabishah.

=== Encirclement ===
On 20 February, the Syrian Army, backed by the National Defence Force, captured the Aleppo Thermal Power Plant and imposed "full control" over the facility. 30 ISIS militants were killed and four of their armored vehicles were destroyed during the battle. Tiger Forces, National Defense Forces and Suqur al-Sahara then captured the village of Balat and its surrounding farms. On the same day, Suqur al-Sahara and the Cheetah Forces Team 3 captured the village of Turaykiyah, fully besieging the pocket of 800 ISIL fighters in east Aleppo, with their only options being to surrender or be killed.

On the next day, 21 February, the last pockets of resistance were overcome, with pro-government forces in possession of all the towns and villages in the Al-Safira plains. It was reported that 700 of the ISIL militants had escaped the encirclement during the previous week as the government forces skirted around their northern flank, leaving 100–150 remaining fighters who were trapped. 20 villages were seized over the previous 24 hours and 40 kilometers of highway were cleared, putting an end to the 3 month offensive. In addition, 50 ISIL fighters were killed during the previous 24 hours.

== See also ==
- Battle of Aleppo (2012–2016)
- Northern Aleppo offensive (2016)
