= 2016 Khanasir offensive =

Military operation

Coordinates: 35.7833°N 37.4972°E

- Part of the Syrian Civil War and the Russian military intervention in the Syrian Civil War
- Map of the course of the offensive (also included the concurrent SAA-led Ithriyah-Raqqa offensive) Syrian Army control Syrian Opposition control Islamic State control
Date	21–29 February 2016 (1 week and 1 day)
Location	Aleppo Governorate, Syria
Result	Syrian Army victory: ISIL and Jund al-Aqsa cut the only government supply route, through the Ithriyah-Aleppo Highway, capturing Khanasir and 12 villages; The Syrian Army recaptures Khanasir and all of the villages lost, and reopens the supply route to Aleppo

Belligerents
(Syria) Syrian Arab Republic: Syrian Army; Syrian Air Force; National Defence Forces; al-Quds Brigades; Ba'ath Brigades; Hezbollah; Russia: Aerospace Forces	Islamic State; Jund al-Aqsa Free Syrian Army

Commanders and leaders
Maj. Gen. Suhayl al-Hasan; Ali Fayyad † (Hezbollah senior commander)	(Islamic State) Umar Al-Absi †(Aleppo commander) (Islamic State) Abu Mu'awiya Al-Halabi † (Islamic State) Hassan Aboud (DOW)

Units involved
Syrian Army: 11th Armored Division; 47th Regiment; Republican Guard; Tiger Forces; Cheetah Forces Team 3; Cheetah Forces Team 6	(Islamic State) Military of ISIL

Strength
Unknown	1,000 ISIL fighters

Casualties and losses
87–94 killed	150 killed (per SOHR); 400–450 killed (per pro-gov. sources)

The 2016 Khanasir offensive was a military operation conducted by ISIL and Jund al-Aqsa, during the Syrian Civil War, with the aim of cutting the Syrian government's only supply route to the northern part of the Aleppo Governorate, which runs through the town of Khanasir.

== The offensive ==
At 10 p.m. on 21 February, the offensive was launched by ISIL. By the next day, a joint attack by militants from both ISIL and al-Qaeda-linked Jund al-Aqsa captured the village of Rasm Al-Nafal, as well as two other points along the Khanasir-Aleppo Road, cutting the Syrian government's only supply route to Aleppo city. The jihadists then proceeded to additionally seize six other villages and a hill. A convoy of reinforcements from the town of As-Safira, consisting of the pro-government Palestinian militia Liwa Al-Quds was sent to reopen the road and by the end of the day they had recaptured the hill.

On 23 February, two contingents of the Syrian Army's special forces unit, known as the Tiger Forces, were also sent to help in reestablishing control of the road. Meanwhile, ISIL launched an assault on the town of Khanasir, commanded by Mahmutcan Ateş, which began with a failed suicide car-bomb attack against a checkpoint in its outskirts. Throughout the morning, the military recaptured four out of seven positions they had lost on the road, but ultimately ISIL managed to capture Khanasir. In the afternoon, the Tiger Forces launched a general counteroffensive with a missile barrage, followed by a tank assault. The Syrian Army waited before entering the villages ISIL had captured, until Russian airstrikes had dissipated. The counterattack was launched from two flanks, with the Tiger Forces and Hezbollah assaulting Rasm Al-Nafal from the north, while the Army and the Liwaa Al-Quds Brigade advanced from the south towards Khanasir. By the evening, government forces recaptured Syria Tel Hill (Tal Syria Tel), outside Khanasir, and Rasm Al-Nafal.

The following morning, the Syrian Army re-entered Khanasir and one other village. Later, they managed to seize Tal Za'rour hill, while also advancing to the central district of Khanasir. At this time, the cutting of the road by ISIL caused prices of food and medical supplies in Aleppo city to raise dramatically. On 25 February, the Tiger Forces and their allies recaptured Khanasir, while several hills outside the town were still ISIL-held. The Army then advanced north of Khanasir and captured the nearby village of Al-Mughayrat, along with four hilltops north of it (including the large Talat Al-Bayda hill). At the same time, government forces advancing from the north seized Shilallah al-Kabeera, which they breached the previous day with the help of Russian airstrikes. By the end of the day, government troops reached two more villages and started preparing for a new assault on the next morning.

Early on 26 February, the Syrian Army made more advances, recapturing three villages. The advances nearly besieged ISIL forces in a pocket of villages southwest of Lake Jabbul. Later in the day, the Army captured the remaining four villages that ISIL held, thus clearing the road to Aleppo. However, elsewhere, ISIL took control of a village near al-Hamam Mountain, that overlooks the supply road. Government forces reportedly re-secured the village the following day.

On 28 February, the Syrian Army captured two villages and two mountain points, near Khanasir. At the same time, elsewhere the Syrian Army captured the last point on the Sheikh Hilal-Ithriya Road that was held by ISIL. On 29 February, the road to Aleppo city was once again reopened.

== Aftermath ==
Between 9 and 10 March, government forces captured 13 villages previously held by ISIL, near the southern bank of Lake Jabbūl, forcing ISIL to set up a new defensive line east of the lake.

On 14 April, ISIL launched another offensive on Khanasir, and by the following day they captured hills near the town, the Duraham Oil Field and 10 villages. They also seized a large cache of weapons, ammunition and several armored vehicles. On 16 April, Syrian Army reinforcements were sent to the area, and by the evening they recaptured all of the territory lost, except the oil field.

Between 26 January and 12 February 2017, heavy fighting took place near Khanasir with back-and-forth fighting. On 12 February, 39 pro-government fighters and at least 12 ISIL militants were killed in an attack by ISIL east of Khanasir and south of Jabboul lake. Towards the end of February, the Republican Guard seized the village of Umm Miyal, east of the highway, along with the adjacent hills.

== See also ==
- Battle of Aleppo (2012–2016)
- Northern Aleppo offensive (2016)
- East Aleppo offensive (2015–16)
