= Raqqa Hawks Brigade =

Militia in Syria

- لواء صقور الرقة; Liwa Suqur al Raqqa
- Logo of the Raqqa Hawks Brigade.
- Leaders: Abu Saleh al-Hindawi (top commander); Abu Adnan (top commander); Fayad Ghanim (surrendered) (leader of the Ghanim group); Ayman Ghanim (Ghanim group spokesman); Abu Yamen al-Meko (POW) (leader of Northern Union); Aboud al-Hafez (Martyr Tasleem Jimmo Brigade leader); Abu Mustafa
- Dates active: 2015 — unknown
- Groups: Ghanim group (formerly, presumed dissolved); Martyr Tasleem Jimmo Brigade; Northern Union (formerly, presumed destroyed)
- Headquarters: Tell Abyad
- Active regions: Raqqa Governorate; Aleppo Governorate; Al-Hasakah Governorate
- Ideology: Neo-Ba'athism (disputed)
- Size: c. 1,000: 50+ (Ghanim group); c. 300 (Martyr Tasleem Jimmo Brigade)
- Part of: Syrian Democratic Forces; Free Syrian Army
- Wars: Syrian Civil War

The Raqqa Hawks Brigade (Arabic: لواء صقور الرقة, romanized: Liwa Suqur al Raqqa), also known as Raqqa Falcons Brigade, is a primarily Arab militia, composed mostly of Raqqa natives, that is part of the Syrian Democratic Forces (SDF) and fights against the Islamic State of Iraq and the Levant (ISIL). The unit's stated goal was to recapture its home city from ISIL, which it achieved by taking part in the Battle of Raqqa (2017). The Raqqa Hawks are considered to have sympathies for and connections with Bashar al-Assad's government.

== History ==
=== Origins ===
The Raqqa Hawks Brigade was originally formed as battalion of the Front of Raqqa Revolutionaries in early 2015, but left the group sometime during 2016. The Russian Armed Forces and the Israeli Begin–Sadat Center have described the Raqqa Hawks Brigade as Free Syrian Army-affiliated faction, but there have also been allegations that the militia is actually loyal to the Syrian government. For example, a representative of the Raqqa Hawks reportedly met with Ba'ath Party officials in Qamishli in September 2016. Members of the militia have stated that their primary aim was revenge against ISIL in general and to free their homelands from ISIL's regime.

In December 2015, the Russian Armed Forces General Staff claimed that the Russian Air Force bombed ISIL targets north of Raqqa to support the Ghanim group, part of the Raqqa Hawks Brigade.

=== Raqqa campaign (2016–17) ===
==== Raqqa countryside and conflicts with the Front of Raqqa Revolutionaries ====
When the group joined the campaign to capture Raqqa in November 2016, it had around 1,000 fighters and was expected to be a "key component of the fight for the city". The Raqqa Hawks Brigade possesses several technicals and gun trucks, the latter of which were mostly captured from ISIL. In mid-November, the Raqqa Hawks Brigade took part in the several days-long battle for Tal Saman, the ISIL headquarters in the northern Raqqa countryside.

In December, tensions rose between the Front of Raqqa Revolutionaries and the Raqqa Hawks Brigade, with several military commanders of the former reportedly defecting to the latter. On 27 December, however, the Front of Raqqa Revolutionaries commanders claimed on video that they had been kidnapped by the Raqqa Hawks Brigade and forced to announce their defection, and that they were still loyal to their old group.

On 20 February 2017, one sub-commander of the Raqqa Hawks Brigade, Abu Yamen al-Meko, who reportedly had strong links to the Military Intelligence Directorate, declared his loyalty to Bashar al-Assad and formed the pro-government unit "Northern Union". His followers consequently raised the Ba'athist flag at their headquarters in the village of al-Fares. These actions, however, provoked the Front of Raqqa Revolutionaries' ire, which launched a surprise attack on al-Fares two days later and destroyed al-Meko's faction, killing or capturing its members. The Front of Raqqa Revolutionaries went on to declare that it "would never allow the regime and its supporting militia to re-enter the city [of Raqqa] by any means".

==== Battle of Tabqa ====
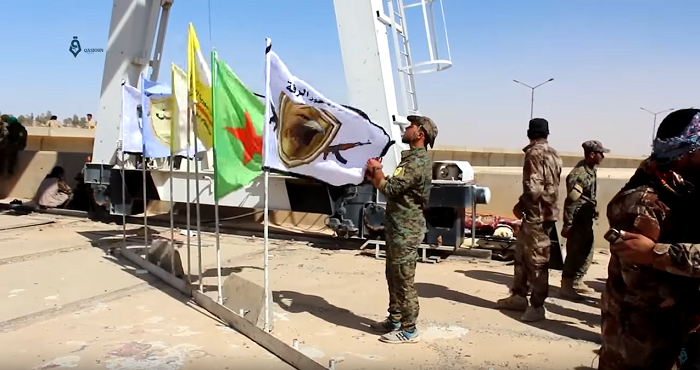
The flag of the Raqqa Hawks Brigade, among other SDF flags, on Tabqa Dam.

On 11 April, the US Air Force mistakenly bombed a position held by the Raqqa Hawks Brigade near the city of al-Thawrah and killed around 17 fighters from the group. BBC producer Riam Dalati went on to claim that the airstrike had been called in by the YPG, which was denied by YPG spokesman Rêdûr Xelîl. The killed fighters were buried with full military honors on the next day near Tell Abyad, with thousands of locals participating in the funeral. The Carter Center claimed that the Raqqa Hawks blamed the YPG for the bombing, and had declared that they would leave the entire Raaqa campaign. This was contradicted by the fact that the group continued to fight alongside the YPG for Raqqa in the following months.

According to a pro-Syrian opposition news outlet, a minor skirmish between the YPG and Raqqa Hawks Brigade fighters took place in northern Tell Abyad in late May. The reason for this incident allegedly was that the YPG had attempted to arrest Raqqa Hawks Brigade members who were suspected of supporting the Assad government.

==== Battle of Raqqa and end of the Ghanim group ====
Following the conquest of al-Thawrah, the Raqqa Hawks Brigade took part in the advance on Raqqa, and was among the SDF units that took part in the assault on the city in June 2017, taking part in the fight for its Roman neighborhood.

On 26 August 2017, the YPG raided the headquarters of the Raqqa Hawks Brigade's Ghanim group in Tell Abyad and captured 15 fighters, including the commander of the group, Fayad Ghanim, in addition to seizing their weapons. Several other fighters from the group fled to Syrian government-controlled territory in the eastern Raqqa countryside. The YPG accused the Ghanim group of coordinating with government forces during their offensive near the area. Despite his purported arrest, Fayad Ghanim too eventually managed to flee into government-controlled areas, where he met and was photographed with the head of the Tiger Forces, Suheil al-Hassan.

Overall, several commanders of the Raqqa Hawks Brigade defected to the government over the course of 2017, and according to WINEP, the loyalty of those who stayed with the SDF remains "dubious". By 2018, a unit known as "Raqqa Hawks Brigade" had become active as part of the pro-government Tiger Forces. It is unclear whether this unit has any relation to the SDF group of the same name. The pro-opposition news site Zaman al Wasl news site continued to list the Raqqa Hawks Brigade as an SDF member group in early 2019.

== Organization ==
Though the Raqqa Hawks Brigade reportedly includes mostly fighters from Raqqa, at least one of its sub-units, the Ghanim group, is composed of people from northern Raqqa Governorate, primarily Tell Abyad. The militia also recruited a substantial number of fighters from the Naim, al-Baggara, and Anazzah tribes.

The Ghanim group was accused by pro-opposition media to be partly funded and equipped by the Air Force Intelligence Directorate and Russia, and several members of the unit actually defected to the Syrian Army in August 2017. Another sub-unit was the group of Abu Yamen al-Meko, who later formed the pro-Assad faction "Northern Union". This group was based in the village of al-Fares west of Tell Abyad, and was eventually destroyed by Jabhat Thuwar al-Raqqa on 22 February 2017.
