= 25th Special Mission Forces Division =

Syrian Army special forces unit

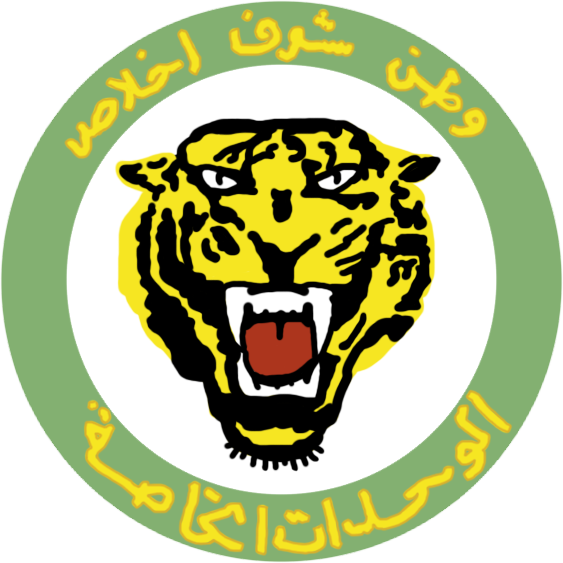
- Logo of the Syrian Special Forces, used by the 25th Special Mission Forces Division
- Active: 2013–2024
- Country: Ba'athist Syria (surrendered)
- Allegiance: Syrian Arab Armed Forces (surrendered)
- Branch: Syrian Arab Army
- Type: Special forces
- Size: 12,000 soldiers (2022)
- Garrison/HQ: Aleppo
- Nickname: Tiger Forces or Quwwat Al-Nimr (Arabic: قوات النمر)
- Tactical color marking
- Equipment: AK-74M rifles T-90 tanks T-72 tanks T-55 tanks
- Engagements: List: Syrian Civil War; Battle of Aleppo; Operation Canopus Star; Kuweires offensive (September–November 2015); East Aleppo offensive (2015–16); 2016 Aleppo campaign; Aleppo offensive (September 2016); Aleppo offensive (October–November 2016); Operation Dawn of Victory; Second Battle of the Shaer gas field; 2014 Hama offensive; 2015 Northwestern Syria offensive; Al-Ghab offensive (July–August 2015); 2016 Khanasir offensive; Palmyra offensive (March 2016); 2016 Hama offensive; Palmyra offensive (December 2016); Palmyra offensive (2017); East Aleppo offensive (January–April 2017); 2017 Hama offensive; Maskanah Plains offensive; Southern Raqqa offensive (June 2017); Central Syria campaign (2017); Hama offensive (September 2017); 2017 Mayadin offensive; Northwestern Syria campaign (October 2017–February 2018); Operation Damascus Steel; Operation Dawn of Idlib; Operation Dawn of Idlib II; Operation Spring Shield; Battle of Aleppo (2024); 2024 Hama offensive; 2024 Homs offensive

Commanders
- Current Commander: Maj. Gen. Saleh al-Abdullah
- Deputy Commander & Chief of Staff: Brig. Gen. Yunis Muhammad
- Commander of Assault Troops: Brig. Gen. Yasser Ahmed
- Notable commanders: Maj. Gen. Suheil al-Hassan

The 25th Special Mission Forces Division, colloquially known by their former name Tiger Forces (Arabic: قُوَّات النِّمْر; Quwwat al-Nimr), was an elite special forces unit, that was part of the Syrian Army under the charge of the commander Major General Saleh al-Abdullah. It was formed in late 2013 and functioned primarily as an offensive unit in the Syrian Civil War. It had been described as a "hot commodity for any government offensive", but their relatively small numbers made it difficult to deploy them to multiple fronts at once.

== Command structure ==
25th SMF Division (2023)

- 26th Infantry Brigade
- 1st, 3rd, 4th, 5th, 6th and 7th Special Forces (Airborne) Regiments
- 75th Armoured Regiment
- 78th Armoured Regiment
- Independent Artillery Regiment

=== Organization until 2019 ===
According to Gregory Waters of the Middle East Institute in October 2018, the Tiger Forces used to deploy approximately 24 groups (halfway between a company and a battalion), which organised about 4,000 infantry, as well as an attached artillery regiment and an armoured unit.^{p. 6} Alongside permanent troops, the Tiger Forces made use of affiliated militia, who remained largely garrisoned in their hometowns until called on to join offensives as the need arose.

==== List of subordinate units in 2018 ====
Later reports seemed to suggest an altered internal structure, stating that the unit consisted of the following subunits:

- Termah (or Tarmeh) Group/Regiment: according to opposition sources had a strength of about 2,000 troops, recruited from northern Hama.^{p. 6}
- Taha Group, officially "Taha Regiment – Assault." It was an assault unit formed in 2014, and was led by Ali Taha. The unit claimed to have 2,500 active members by mid-2018.
- Yarrob Group/Regiment
- Shaheen Group/Regiment
- Shabaat Group/Regiment
- Al Hawarith Group/Regiment (Navaris Group)
- Zaydar Group/Regiment
- Al Shabbour Group/Regiment
- Al-Komeet Group/Regiment
- Al-Luyouth Group/Regiment (Shadi Group)
- Hayder Group/Regiment
- Raqqa Hawks Brigade (not to be confused with the Syrian Democratic Forces' Raqqa Hawks Brigade)

The Tiger Forces consisted of as many as 24 subgroups of varying size. Tiger Forces groups/subunits were founded by prominent individuals who often also served as commanders of a particular group (the group often bearing the name of the individual who founded and/or commanded the group). The Tiger Forces regular groups had local defensive units, as well as operational units which deployed across the country.^{p. 6} According Gregory Waters, the operational units outside standing groups made up one-and-a-half to two brigades.^{p. 6}

==== Cheetah Forces ====
Cheetah Forces or Qawat al-Fahoud (قوات الفهود) as of October 2018 was the largest sub-unit of the Tiger Forces.^{p. 8} The Cheetah Forces was subdivided into as many as 14 Company-level units: Cheetah 1 to Cheetah 10, Cheetah 15, Cheetah 16, Cheetah 41 and the 2nd Storming Battalion (Rami Hamadi Group).^{p. 8} Cheetah 6 were the first soldiers that ended the 35-month long Relieving of Kuweires Military Airbase, while Cheetah 3 along with the Desert Hawks Brigade completed the East Aleppo ISIS encirclement.

The commander of the Cheetah Forces was Brigadier General Ali Ahmed Kna’an al-Hajji^{p. 11} and the deputy commander was Colonel Lu’ayy Sleitan.

==== Panther Forces ====
Panther Forces – According to Leith Fadel in 2016, the commander was Colonel Ali Shaheen, and they were involved in the Palmyra offensive (March 2016), where they were redeployed to another front after it was over. According to Waters, the "Panther Groups" were actually the Cheetahs, and were not commanded by Ali Shaheen, who instead commanded the Leouth Groups.

==== Armour and artillery units ====
The Tiger Forces had a dedicated artillery regiment (led by Lieutenant Colonel Dourid Awad) and an armoured unit; both the artillery and armoured units appeared to be distinct entities within the Tiger Forces.^{p. 6}

Both the artillery and armoured units were independent from other groups, reporting directly to the Tiger Forces’ command. The size of the armoured unit was unknown.

== Combat history ==
The special forces unit was formed during the Syrian civil war.

According to Gregory Waters, the Tiger Forces were operated by the Air Force Intelligence Directorate.^{p. 2} After successful operations in Latakia and Hama,^{p. 2} Colonel Suheil al-Hassan was tasked a special project by the Syrian Armed Forces Central Command in the fall of 2013—to train and lead a Special Forces unit that would work primarily as an offensive unit. Colonel Hassan handpicked many of the soldiers that would later form the Tiger Forces. Initially, the unit was formed by recruiting personnel from the 53rd Regiment (part of Special Forces Command) and the 14th Special Forces Division, on the other hand, heavy equipment was supplied by the 4th and 11th Divisions.

On 25 December 2015, Suheil al-Hassan was promoted to major general after refusing to be brigadier general the year before. He played a key role in commanding Syrian troops during the 2016 Aleppo campaign. The Tiger Forces were tasked with cutting the key rebel supply lines to Aleppo city.

In early spring 2015, following Syrian government's loss of the city of Idlib, the unit was reorganised.^{p. 3} The Tiger Forces were one of few in the Syrian Army to first deploy Russian T-90 tanks, others being the 4th Armoured Division and Desert Hawks Brigade. A Russian-supplied Rys LMV was seen after defeating ISIL in the village of Ayn Al-Hanish in the Dayr Hafir Plains.

The most famous and effective tactic of the Tiger Forces was probing the enemy from multiple axes to find a weak spot, then sending a large mechanized force to that area to capture many villages at once. According to Gregory Waters, they ultimately reported to Major General Jamil Hassan, the director of the country's Air Force Intelligence Directorate.

In September/October 2018, reports indicated that between 6,500 and 8,000 Tiger Forces members would be demobilized. It was reported that the unit worked closely with Russian KSSO units, the latter acting as advisors.

=== Renaming and reorganization ===
On 29 August 2019, the Syrian Ministry of Defense reorganized the unit, renaming it from Tiger Forces to 25th Special Mission Forces Division and placing it under the Syrian Army's central command, while keeping Maj. Gen. Suheil al-Hassan as its commanding officer. In March 2022, the Wagner Group began recruiting ex-members of the 25th Special Mission Forces Division so that they could fight for Russia in the Russo-Ukrainian War, which was later denied. Nine soldiers from this unit were killed as mercenaries in Ukraine as of November 2022.

In April 2024, Maj. Gen. Suheil al-Hassan was replaced as head of 25th Division by former senior Tiger Forces commander, former 30th Division commander Maj. Gen. Saleh al-Abdullah.

=== Fall of the Assad regime ===
When the Syrian opposition launched a series of major offensives in late 2024, the 25th Division was among the few loyalist units which tried to stem the rebel advance. The division was deployed to Aleppo, where it joined the unsuccessful defense of the city. On 30 November 2024, the unit was redeployed to stop the Hay'at Tahrir al-Sham and the Syrian National Army in their 2024 Hama offensive. On December 4, 2024 rebels captured a base of the 25th SMFD in Hama.

Following the fall of the Assad regime, 25th Division member Talal Dakkak, who had previously "fed prisoners to President's pet lion", was captured and executed by a pro-opposition militias in Hama. The whereabouts of division commander Suhayl al-Hasan initially remained unknown. Followers of al-Hasan subsequently became involved in an Assadist insurgency.

== See also ==
- Republican Guard
- Desert Hawks Brigade
- Ba'ath Brigades
- Syrian Marines
