= 30th Division (Syria) =

- الفرقة 30 الحرس الجمهوري
- Republican Guard shoulder sleeve insignia
- Active: January 2017–2024
- Disbanded: December 2024
- Country: Ba'athist Syria
- Allegiance: President of Syria
- Branch: Syrian Army
- Type: Commando; Mechanized infantry Special forces
- Size: 30,000 guardsmen (as of 2017)
- Part of: Republican Guard
- Garrison/HQ: Aleppo
- Engagements: Syrian Civil War; Northwestern Syria offensive (December 2019–March 2020); Northwestern Syria clashes (December 2022–November 2024)

Commanders
- Current Commander: Maj. Gen. Mohamad Saftly
- Deputy Commander: Maj. Gen. Nizar Yunis
- Brigade Commanders: Brig. Gen. Aqil Jumaa (106th Brigade)
- Notable commanders: Maj. Gen. Ziad Ali Salah; Maj. Gen. Zeid Salih; Maj. Gen. Malik Aliaa; Maj. Gen. Saleh al-Abdullah; Brig. Gen. Burhan Rahmun †

The 30th Division (Arabic: الفرقة 30 الحرس الجمهوري) was the only elite combined forces division of the Syrian Republican Guard (SRG), established in 2017. Its main purpose was similar to other SRG units, to protect the second largest city of Syria, Aleppo, from any foreign or domestic threats.

== Commanders ==
- Maj. Gen. Ziad Ali Salah (January 2017—November 2017)
  - Deputy Commander: Maj. Gen. Zeid Salih
- Brig. Gen. Malik Aliaa (November 2017—December 2018)
  - Deputy Commander: Brig. Gen. Barakat Ali Barakat
- Maj. Gen. Barakat Ali Barakat (December 2018—October 2022)
  - Deputy Commander: Brig. Gen. Saleh al-Abdullah (August 2022—October 2022)
- Maj. Gen. Saleh al-Abdullah (October 2022—April 2024)
- Maj. Gen. Mohamad Saftly (April 2024—December 2024)
  - Deputy Commander: Maj. Gen. Nizar Yunis (May 2023—December 2024)

== Command structure ==
As of October 2022, according to Gregory Waters, 30th Division operated five brigades, three special forces regiments and one artillery regiment: (Note: Including units created after 2017)

30th Division (2022)

- 102nd Commando Brigade
- 106th Mechanized Brigade
- 123rd Special Forces Brigade
- 124th Special Forces Brigade
- 135th Mechanized Brigade
- 47th Special Forces Regiment
- 93rd Special Forces Regiment
- 147th Special Forces Regiment
- Artillery Regiment

== Combat history ==
The 30th Division was established in January 2017, following the Syrian government's regain of Aleppo city. According Kheder Khaddour, the 30th Division united Aleppo's local militias as an umbrella organization and for while retaining their independent operating structures. The Republican Guard created the new 30th Division to incorporate all its units in Aleppo under a single nominal command, and to integrate the paramilitary militias in the city (already operating under the Republican Guard supervision) into the Republican Guard organization.

The then-deputy commander of the Republican Guard and overall military commander of the 2016 Aleppo offensive, Maj. Gen. Ziad Ali Salah, was appointed in charge of the 30th Division until November 2017 with Major General Zeid Salih as his deputy. In November 2017 Brigadier General Malik Aliaa took over the command, he was later promoted as the new SRG commander. In October 2022, Major General Saleh al-Abdullah was named as a commander of the unit. By 2022, the 30th Division was rebuilt into a regular military unit composed of elite guardsmen.

== See also ==
- Republican Guard (Syria)
