= 2017 Southern Raqqa offensive =

Offensive

- Part of Russian military intervention in Syria and the Syrian Civil War
- Situation in central Syria between 13 and 30 June. The Southern Raqqa offensive is shown at the top of the map
Date	13–30 June 2017 (2 weeks and 3 days)
Location	Southwestern Raqqa Governorate and southern Aleppo Governorate Syria
Result	Major Syrian Army victory: Syrian Armed Forces recapture entire road between Resafa and Ithriya from ISIL; ISIL forces expelled from Aleppo Governorate

Belligerents
(Syria) Syrian Government; Russia	Islamic State

Commanders and leaders
Maj. Gen. Suheil al-Hassan (Operations chief commander); Ali Adra †; Tiger Forces commander)	(Islamic State) Unknown

Units involved
Syrian Armed Forces; Syrian Army; Tiger Forces; Syrian Air Force; Liwa al-Quds; Al-Baggara tribe militias; Russian Armed Forces; Aerospace Forces	(Islamic State) Military of ISIL; Wilāyat Ḥalab (until 30 June, 2017); Wilāyat ar-Raqqa

Casualties and losses
183–333 killed	Unknown

The 2017 Southern Raqqa offensive was an operation by the Syrian Army against the Islamic State (IS) in the southwestern countryside of the Raqqa Province.

== Background ==
In early May 2017, Syrian government forces launched an offensive against ISIL in the eastern countryside of Aleppo, capturing the Jirah Airbase late on 12 May.

Following this, by early June, the Syrian Army, led by the Tiger forces, captured the town of Maskanah and its surrounding villages after ISIL fighters withdrew from the area, thus expelling ISIL from its last stronghold in Aleppo governorate. The next day, the Army came reached the boundaries of Ar-Raqqah Governorate.

== The offensive ==
On 13 June, the Syrian Army made a large advance into the Raqqah governorate, capturing several villages, and thus reaching the Ithriya-Al-Thawrah road. These advances were made with little resistance from ISIL. Four days later, the Army progressed further eastwards, overtaking 14 sites, thus coming close to ISIL-held Resafa.

During 18 June, the Syrian Army captured the last two villages on the road to Resafa. Later that day, an F/A-18 Super Hornet launched from USS George H.W. Bush shot down a Syrian Air Force Su-22M4, over airstrikes carried out by the SAF against what the Coalition claimed to be the SDF, while Syria said was ISIL in the village of Ja'din. Later, clashes broke out near Resafa between the Syrian Army and the SDF, as the former attempted to rescue the pilot of the downed jet. The next day, Resafa was captured by the Syrian Army.

On 22 June, ISIL attempted to cut off the Syrian Army supply line to Resafa near the town of Um Sosah, but the assault was thwarted before it even began. On 30 June, the Syrian Army regained complete control of the Ithriya-Thawrah road, besieging the remaining ISIL held area in Aleppo. Subsequently, ISIL evacuated the pocket and the SAA captured all of the remaining ISIL-held towns, villages, and desert in the Aleppo province.

== Aftermath ==
On 15 July Tiger Forces captured half a dozen oil fields in Ar-Raqqah province, the next day, Tiger Forces captured Al-Fahd Oil Field and nearby Al-Fahd Oil Station and advanced further to the south of Resafa in Ar-Raqqah Governorate capturing Zamleh Sharqiyah, B’ir Zamleh and al-Khalaa gas fields. Building on these gains, further progress has been made on 17 July with Deilla oil field being restored under government control. A couple more oil fields were captured later in the day alongside the town of Rajm Al-Joz. On 22 July, the Syrian Army advanced even further, capturing Sabkhawi from ISIS and moving closer to SDF held northern Syria.
