= Desert Hawks Brigade =

Syrian private militia

Desert Hawks Brigade (Liwa Suqur al-Sahara)
- Desert Hawks Brigade shoulder sleeve insginia
- Leader: Col. Mohammad Jaber
- Dates active: 2013 – August 2017
- Headquarters: Aleppo
- Active regions: Syria
- Part of: Syrian Army
- Wars: the Syrian Civil War

The Desert Hawks Brigade (Arabic: لواء صقور الصحراء, liwāʾ suqūr aṣ-ṣaḥrāʾ, Liwa Suqur al-Sahara) was an armed private militia branch affiliated with the Syrian Arab Army which fought on the side of the Syrian government in the Syrian Civil War. It was primarily composed of former military officers and veterans as well as volunteers from other pro-government groups, with an age range of 25 to 40 years. The brigade has been described as an "elite" group trained in ambush tactics, and has been employed in special assignments on several fronts. The group was equipped with light and medium arms, and was given artillery support from the regular Syrian Army when needed.

== History ==
According to some sources, the group was formed in Homs Governorate and operated in the desert regions bordering Iraq and Jordan to cut routes used by anti-government rebel groups to smuggle fighters and supplies in and out of Syria. However, other sources state that the group was formed in early 2013 due to a near general collapse of the Syrian Army supply system where by mid-2012 the Army soldiers lacked not only fuel and ammunition but also basic necessities such as food. In an environment of an internationally imposed embargo the Syrian government reached out to wealthy and well connected individuals (often of highly controversial background) such as Mohamed Jaber and Ayman Jaber in order to provide the necessary resources. In addition, the Syrian government allowed such individuals to form private militia units, such as Desert Hawks, whose members were better equipped than regular army soldiers due to connections and financial resources available to the Jaber brothers. Some sources also state that "paramilitary recruitment has been far more successful than army conscription, as it tends to occur through local, informal networks and family or community ties... it’s also easier to join a paramilitary group and then leave it".

Although funded and formed by the Jaber brothers the unit was operationally led by Staff Colonel Mohsen Said Hussein, a Republican Guard officer and paratrooper.

One of the units tasks was to protect the oil and gas fields on Syrian territory and serve as a rapid response force.

== Service history ==
It participated in the June 2013 capture of the town of al-Qaryatayn, where it lost one of its commanders in the fighting. After rebels launched an offensive in northern Latakia Governorate and seized control of the majority-Armenian town of Kessab, Suqur al-Sahra was transferred to that front, where its members helped lead the capture of the strategic height of Tower 45, losing at least three members in combat.

In November 2014 during the battle for Shaer gas field the units (operational) commander Mohsen Hussein was killed while attempting to expel ISIL terrorists from the facility.

In December 2015 the unit participated in operation which rescued a downed Russian co-pilot after his plane was shot down by a Turkish F-16 fighter jet (the pilot was killed by anti-government armed forces while descending to the ground).

In course of the 2015–16 Latakia offensive, the brigade developed a close connection to the Shia militant group LAAG, which began to provide advisors to Suqur al-Sahara.

The unit participated in both Palmyra liberation campaigns. However, during the first liberation campaign, in March 2016, it was involved in a friendly fire incident with the SAA Tiger Forces members which left 9 Desert Hawk members dead and several dozen injured. The incident badly strained the relationship/cooperation between the two most successful Syrian pro-government units which had successfully cooperated just one month prior, in East Aleppo.

In June 2016 the unit together with the Syrian Marines (a sister unit of the Desert Hawks which is led by Ayman Jaber, the brother of Desert Hawks leader Mohamed Jaber) participated in the unsuccessful Ithriyah-Raqqa offensive with some sources blaming the stated units for the failure. However, other sources pointed to a general lack of planning in the Syrian Arab Army high command as the root cause of the failure. The offensive began shortly after Kurdish forces achieved notable advances in Manbij and the Syrian command attempted to exploit this, reportedly believing that ISIL would be unable to fight on two different fronts simultaneously.

Desert Hawks participated in the Aleppo liberation campaign which was successfully concluded in December 2016.

In early 2017 one of the Desert Hawks founders was arrested by other government forces after supposedly "interfering with a government convoy".

In late June 2017 the unit deployed to the East Hama front but was withdrawn after only a few days for unknown reasons. In early July 2017, reports emerged that members of the unit had allegedly desecrated corpses of killed ISIL terrorists.

By September 2019, more than 1,000 Desert Hawks members were killed during the Syrian Civil War.

== Portrayal in the media ==
The Desert Hawks together with the Syrian Arab Army Tiger Forces were one of the most combat effective pro-government units. However, the units success on the battlefield was frequently overshadowed by the highly negative public perceptions of their founders (Mohamed Jaber and Ayman Jaber) who are portrayed as warlords and smugglers exploiting the war situation in Syria in order to increase their own personal wealth. Subsequently, the Desert Hawks were stigmatized as Jaber's own personal guard and only then a pro-government unit of possibly questionable long-term loyalty to the current Syrian government. On the other hand, other pro-government units had a similar oligarch background, for example, the Syrian Arab Army Tiger Forces (which are highly praised in the pro-government media).

== Disbandment ==
On 2 August 2017, the Desert Hawks Brigade was disbanded, with Colonel Jaber returning to Russia, Ukraine or the disputed Crimea region to continue his pre-war employment. The soldiers will allegedly be spread out between the Qalamoun Shield Forces, 3rd Armoured Division, the 5th Corps and the Syrian Marines of 103rd Commando Brigade of the Republican Guard which is commanded by his brother, Colonel Aymen Jaber. A transfer to the closely linked Syrian Marines seemed unlikely since the personnel from this unit have also began transferring to other units.

== See also ==
- 25th Special Mission Forces Division
- Ba'ath Brigades
- Syrian Resistance
