= Suhayl al-Hasan =

Syrian military commander (born 1970)

- سهيل الحسن
- Born: 10 June 1970 (age 56); Beit Ana, Jableh, Latakia, Syria
- Other name: النمر Al-Nimr ('the Tiger')
- Military career
- Allegiance: Ba'athist Syria
- Branch: Syrian Arab Army
- Service years: 1991–2024
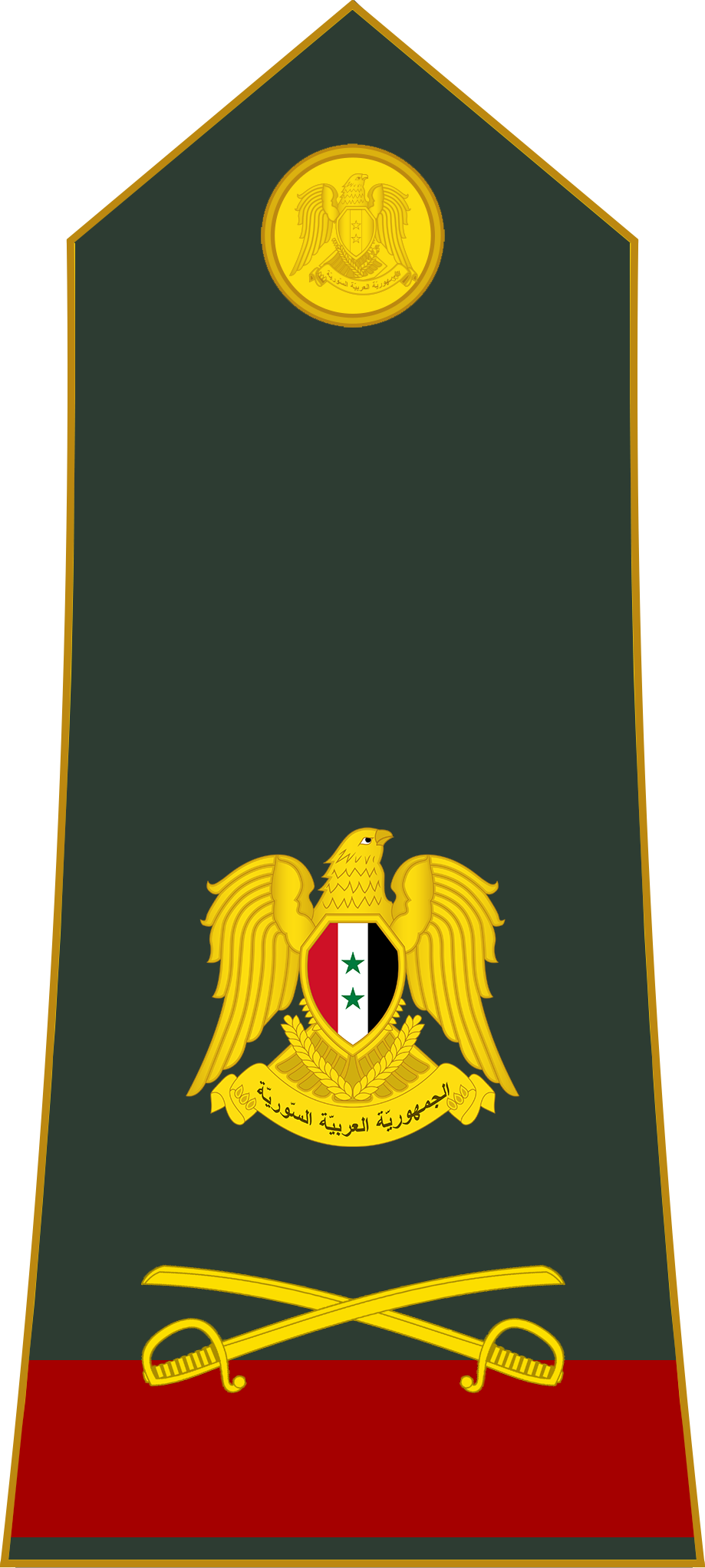
- Rank: Major General
- Commands: Special Forces Command; 25th Special Mission Forces Division
- Conflicts: Syrian civil war; Battle of Aleppo; Operation Northern Storm; Operation Canopus Star; Kuweires offensive; East Aleppo offensive; 2016 Aleppo summer campaign; 2012 Hama offensive; First Battle of the Shaer gas field; Second Battle of the Shaer gas field; Second siege of Wadi Deif; 2014 Hama offensive; 2015 Northwestern Syria offensive; Al-Ghab offensive (July–August 2015) (WIA); 2016 Khanasir offensive; Palmyra offensive (March 2016); Palmyra offensive (2017); East Aleppo offensive (January–April 2017); Maskanah Plains offensive; Central Syrian campaign; Northwestern Syria campaign (October 2017–February 2018); Rif Dimashq offensive (February–April 2018); Eastern Qalamoun offensive (April 2018); 2018 Southern Syria offensive; Northwestern Syria offensive (April–August 2019); Northwestern Syria offensive (December 2019–March 2020); Operation Spring Shield; 2024 Syrian opposition offensives; 2024 Hama offensive
- Awards: Order of Civil Merit; Order of Bravery; Order of Friendship (Russia)

Major General Suhayl al-Hasan (Arabic: سُهَيْلُ الْحَسَنِ, romanized: Suhayl al-Ḥasan; born 10 June 1970) is a former Syrian military officer, serving as the commander of the Syrian Arab Army's Special Forces. He graduated from the Syrian Air Force academy in 1991, and served in many units in the Syrian Air Defence Force Command, completing several training courses. Following his service in the Syrian Air Force and Air Defence units, he joined the Air Force Intelligence service, where he was responsible for the training of the elements of the Special Operations Section. During the Syrian Civil War, al-Hasan has served and commanded his troops during several major engagements, including Operation Canopus Star and the battle for the Shaer gas field. He is part of the new generation of field Syrian army commanders who emerged during the civil war. In 2015, French newspaper Le Monde mentioned al-Hasan as a potential rival to Assad as leader of Syria.

Al-Hasan was described by analysts as preferring Russia (as opposed to Iran) to serve as the Syrian Government's main ally during the civil war and subsequent post-war reconstruction. His position is contrasted by Maher al-Assad, brother of Syrian president Bashar al-Assad and head of Syria's Republican Guard and 4th Armoured Division, who is reported as preferring Iran. After the fall of the Assad regime in 2024, Al-Hasan went into hiding.

== Biography ==
Al-Hasan is an Alawite. He has a son that, as of November 2014, he had not seen for four years due to the Syrian civil war. Hassan's first major media appearance was a spring 2014 video filmed and posted online by the pro-government Sama TV, showing Hassan visiting troops at the front in Aleppo. He is known for liking poetry, even broadcasting his own poems over to the loudspeaker at his enemies, as a warning of what will come if they do not surrender. He says that he always tries to give a chance to his enemies to give up and surrender, but has no pity if they do not or if they betray him.

Hassan refused a promotion to become brigadier general in order to continue to lead his troops directly on the battlefield. His battle tactics have been described as utilizing a scorched earth policy followed by assaulting opposition positions with house to house raids. A Syrian military source claimed Hassan had "never lost any battles" with Syrian opposition forces, yet the second siege of Wadi Deif was seen as a personal defeat for Hassan, while the Tiger forces under Hassan's command failed to break opposition force's lines when dispatched to Idlib to counter opposition offensives in 2015.

On 25 December 2015, al-Hassan was allegedly promoted from colonel to brigadier general, though Hassan's rank was disputed. On 31 December 2022, he was promoted to major general. On 9 April 2024, he was appointed as Commander of the Special Forces of the Syrian Arab Army.

== Military service ==
In 1991, al-Hasan was graduated with the rank of Lieutenant from the Homs Military College. He was quickly inducted into the Air Force Intelligence Directorate’s Special Operations Unit, where he would oversee the training and development of Syria's paratrooper contingents of the Syrian Arab Army (SAA). Impressed with Hassan's work ethic and effectiveness, the Syrian Arab Army's Central Command transferred him to the Syrian Air Force Intelligence headquarters; this coincided with the rise of al-Qaeda activity from 2005 to 2006. Known to be relentless and prudent, Colonel Hassan infiltrated Al-Qaeda networks inside Syria, resulting in the arrest of a number of its members operating within the borders of the country.

=== During the Syrian civil war ===
In 2011, Colonel al-Hasan was transferred to the SAA's Special Forces (Qawat Al-Khassa), leading the front against Al-Qaeda in Syria—the Al-Nusra Front—on the outskirts of Latakia in 2013. His success led many in the Central Command to recommend his transfer to other fronts. He later spent his time in Hama until he was tasked with a special project by the Central Command in the fall of 2013—to train and lead a Special Forces unit that would work primarily as an offensive unit. Colonel Hassan handpicked many of the soldiers that would later form the Tiger Forces; this included his close confidant and companion, Captain Lu’ayy Al-Sleitan.

==== Ariha Battle (August 2013) ====
In August 2013, the strategically important city of Ariha in Idlib governorate fell to the rebels. al-Hassan led the counterattack on the town. The battle lasted 10 days, and the Syrian army, backed up by heavy airstrikes, managed to retake control of the town, expelling the rebels.

==== Aleppo campaign (September 2013 – July 2014) ====
On 26 August 2013, rebels captured the strategic town of Khanasir, cutting the government's last land supply route, passing through the desert, to the contested city of Aleppo. al-Hassan was tasked to reopen the road, and left from Hama leading a big military convoy, in order to achieve this goal. On 3 October, after a week-long battle, the Syrian army took back the control of Khanasir. One week later and after more than 40 villages captured, the siege of Aleppo by the rebels was broken. By this point, al-Hassan's forces had advanced 250 km into rebel lines to lift the siege of the city.

After, solidifying control around Aleppo airport by taking Base 80 and Naqqarin at the end of 2013, al-Hassan and his troops pushed north toward the industrial city.

The Aleppo industrial city, named Sheikh Najjar, is a huge industrial complex located north of Aleppo. It was the most heavily fortified position of the rebels during the war, with miles of tunnels and rebels weapons factories. The battle lasted from January 2014 and ended 4 July with the complete takeover of the industrial city by the Syrian Army.

On 22 May 2014, the Syrian troops led by al-Hassan, managed to relieve the Aleppo central prison, which was besieged and attacked relentlessly by rebels and jihadists for more than one year. It was a symbolic victory for the Syrian army, and allowed the Syrian troops to close another supply road used by the rebels in Aleppo, who were besieging Aleppo in the summer of 2013, and were in position to be besieged in eastern Aleppo at the end of 2014.

Opposition forces claim that when they attempted to negotiate the return of Iranian-sponsored Afghan fighters that were captured during the battle, Hassan responded "Do what you want with them. You can kill them, they're just mercenaries. We can send you thousands of them."

==== Hama campaign (July 2014 – October 2014) ====
In July 2014, Al-Qaeda Syrian branch, al-Nusra Front, launched a big offensive, personally led by their supreme leader, Ahmed al-Sharaa, in the north of Hama Governorate, threatening both Hama city and the Hama Military Airport, as well as the Christian city of Mhardeh. The situation was difficult for the Syrian army and colonel al-Hassan was assigned the task of leading all the military operations in the governorate to counter the al-Nusra threat. Observers were judging the mission to be very difficult, given the high numbers of Al Nusra and rebels forces committed to the battle and the fact that a lot of Hassan forces were still on the Aleppo front. Hassan arrived in Hama governorate at the end of August with some of his elite troops who made an immediate impact. The Syrian troops quickly took control of Arzah, Khittab and its base, and ended the jihadist attack on Mhardeh. The counterattack gained momentum and eventually reversed all rebels gains, including Helfaya in less than one month.

The army continued its offensive, entering previously held rebel territory, putting under heavy pressure rebel strongholds of Lataminah and Kafr Zita, and retaking the strategic towns of Morek, where Syrian army had failed to dislodge rebels during 10 months.

==== Homs desert and Shaer gas field (November 2014 – March 2015) ====
In early November 2014, he took part in the operation to retake the gas field seized at the end of the previous month by the jihadists of the Islamic State.

==== Idlib (April 2015 – June 2015) ====
In late April 2015, he was at the front lines in Idlib Governorate fighting against a massive rebel assault on Jisr al-Shughur. A video surfaced of him making a dire call to the Syrian Defence Minister for supplies saying that he has 800 men and they need ammunition immediately, he says they can return (to the fight, presumably) but they need ammunition. Col. Jemiel Radoon of the Falcons of al-Ghab, a Free Syrian Army battalion that made attempts to block Hassan's retreat from Idlib, stated regarding the video: "I know him. He was rattled. He’d lost his composure".

On 13 June, one of Hassan's bodyguards was killed by sniper fire.

==== Al-Ghab offensive (July–August 2015) ====
On 7 August, Hassan was wounded in a rebel mortar attack on a government military camp.

==== Breaking the siege of Kuweires airport (October 2015 – November 2015) ====
The Kuweires military airport located in east Aleppo countryside was besieged first by rebels groups in 2013 and then by the Islamic State following their capture of rebel territory east of Aleppo in 2014. The Syrian soldiers holed up inside repelled several attempts by the Islamic state to take the base. The Syrian army started a military operation in September 2015 retaking some positions near Kweires. By mid-October, al-Hassan and his Tiger forces started to advance on Kweires seizing village after village towards Kuweires. ISIS attacked and cut the main road between Aleppo and Hama during two weeks and launched an attack on the strategic city of al-Safirah in attempt to divert the army but was repelled. The siege was finally broken on 11 November after nearly a one-month offensive to close the 10 km gap between the army position and the airbase. President Bashar Al-Assad personally congratulated al-Hassan on his role in breaking the siege on the air-base.

==== Targeting by Turkish drone strike ====
On 4 March 2020, as part of Operation Spring Shield Turkish sources claimed that al-Hassan was targeted and wounded by Turkish drone strikes near Saraqib.

==== Regime collapse and fleeing Syria ====
Al-Hasan commanded the Tiger Forces, leading government operations against opposition factions during the 2024 Hama offensive. However, he was unable to prevent the regime's defeat and the fall of Hama to the Military Operations Command. Afterwards, he reportedly fled to Moscow following the fall of the al-Assad regime in December 2024. He later coordinated with other former regime leaders, including Ghiath Dalla, in organizing attacks on the new Syrian government forces.

He was sanctioned by the European Union on 23 June 2025 for his involvement in the Tiger Forces and in the Coastal Shield Brigade after the fall of the Assad regime.

According to a December 2025 Al-Jazeera report, a hacker who posed as a Mossad agent allegedly obtained recordings and documents where Al-Hasan condemned Hamas' October 7, 2023 attacks. He and Ghiath Dalla also supposedly considered Israeli collaboration against the Syrian transitional government.
