= Ba'ath Brigades =

Volunteer militia made up of Syrian Ba'ath Party members

Ba'ath Brigades كتائب البعث
- Ba'ath Brigades SSI and Insignia Ba'ath Brigades Flag
- Founder: Hilal Hilal
- Leaders: Jihad Barakat (Commander in Homs); Ra’ed al-Ghadban (Commander in Deir ez-Zor); Mohammed Khaddour (Commander in Al-Hasakah); Col. Salama Mohammed † (Commander in Tartus); Bassem Sudan (Commander in Latakia); Isam Nabhan Subai (Commander in Hama)
- Dates active: Summer 2012 – September 2018
- Headquarters: Aleppo
- Active regions: Syria: Aleppo Governorate; Homs Governorate; Damascus Governorate; Latakia Governorate; Tartus Governorate; As-Suwayda Governorate; Hasakah Governorate; Deir ez-Zor Governorate
- Ideology: Neo-Ba'athism; Assadism
- Political position: Far-left
- Size: 7,000 claimed (December 2013)
- Part of: Syrian Ba'ath Party
- Wars: the Syrian Civil War

The Ba'ath Brigades (Arabic: كتائب البعث, romanized: Katā'ib al-Baʿth), also known as the Ba'ath Battalions, were a Syrian volunteer militia made up of Syrian Ba'ath Party members, almost entirely of Sunni Muslims from Syria and many Arab countries, loyal to the Ba'athist-led regime in power at the time.

== History ==
They were set up in Aleppo under the command of Hilal Hilal, the former Assistant Regional Secretary, after rebels took most of the eastern half of the city in the summer of 2012. Initially, the Ba'ath Brigades were used to guard government buildings and other key installations in Aleppo, but their role expanded as their strength grew from 5,000 members in November 2012 to 7,000 in December 2013. Units later formed in Latakia and Tartus. At the end of 2013, the Brigades began deploying in Damascus, tasked with manning checkpoints and conducting "light logistical operations". They spearheaded the assault on the Old City of Aleppo in early 2014.

The Ba'ath Battalions participated in lifting the three-year siege at Kuweires military airbase alongside the elite Cheetah Forces, and National Defence Forces.

The Ba'ath Brigades were previously led by Ra'ed bin 'Ali Ghadban—a high-ranking member of the Ba'ath Party's Deir ez-Zor branch. He resigned as the brigades' commander in 2017 to become a member of the central committee of the party, as well as a member of the Syrian government's delegation to the Sochi peace talks in the context of the Syrian peace process.

On 27 February 2017, Col. Salama Mohammed, a high-ranking Ba'ath Brigades commander and leader of the group's Tartus Governorate branch, was reportedly killed in action while fighting in the area around Hama. Some claimed, however, that Mohammed had instead died of a heart attack.

The Ba'ath Legion of the Syrian Army's 5th Corps was formed from Ba'ath Brigades volunteers.

By mid-2018, the Syrian government began to disband the Ba'ath Brigades, as well as other pro-government militias, integrating parts of them into the Syrian Army.

The Ba'ath Brigades were dissolved following the Idlib demilitarization agreement in September 2018. The group's then-leader, Jihad Barakat, announced on his Facebook page that "the military operations conducted by Baath forces have completely ended".

=== Legacy ===
Despite the Ba'ath Brigades' end, several of their former commanders continued to play a prominent role in Syria. Bassem Sudan and Isam Nabhan Subai, former commanders of the brigades in Latakia and Hama, respectively, successfully ran as candidates in the 2020 Syrian parliamentary election.

== See also ==
- Arab Socialist Ba'ath Party – Syria Region
- List of armed groups in the Syrian Civil War
- Popular Army (Iraq)
