= Opposition–Islamic State conflict during the Syrian civil war =

Conflict between Syrian opposition forces and the Islamic State

Opposition–ISIL conflict during the Syrian civil war
- Part of the Syrian civil war and al-Qaeda–Islamic State conflict
Date	2 January 2014 – c. 2018 (4 years)
Location	Syria
Status	Syrian opposition victory

Belligerents
Free Syrian Army; Ahrar al-Sham; Jaysh al-Islam; Suqour al-Sham Brigades; Support: United States (2014–2017); Turkey; Qatar; Saudi Arabia (2014–2017); France (2014–2018); Hay'at Tahrir al-Sham (from 2017); Al-Nusra Front (until 2017)	Islamic State

Commanders and leaders
(Syrian opposition) Albay Ahmed Berri (FSA Chief of Staff); Zahran Alloush † (Islamic Front Military leader); Ahmed Abu Issa (Islamic Front leader); Abu Khalid al-Suri † (Ahrar al-Sham senior leader) Ahmed al-Sharaa (HTS leader); Abu Mohammad al-Ansari † (al-Nusra Front Idlib chief); Abu Sa'ad al-Hadrami † (al-Nusra Front Raqqa chief)	(Islamic State) Abu Bakr al-Baghdadi (Islamic State) Abu Ali al-Anbari † (Emir of Syria) (Islamic State) Abu Ayman al-Iraqi † (Head of military council) (Islamic State) Abu Omar al-Shishani † (ISIL field commander) (Islamic State) Haji Bakr † (Senior ISIL commander) (Islamic State) Abu Baraa al-Jazairi † (Emir of Saraqeb) (Islamic State) Abu Dajana † (Emir of Deir ez-Zor) (Islamic State) Abu Mohammad Al-Massri † (Emir of Manbij); Abu Haidara Al-Tounisi † (eastern Qalamoun leader)

Strength
(Syrian opposition) Free Syrian Army 60,000+ Islamic Front 40,000–70,000 Hay'at Tahrir al-Sham 15,000 (2022)	Islamic State 31,000–50,000

Casualties and losses
2,764+ killed	2,196+ killed
- 605 civilians killed 76 unidentified killed an additional 1,200 combatants and 150 civilians estimated killed Total: 5,641–6,991 killed (up until 28 June 2014)

Opposition–ISIL conflict during the Syrian Civil War started after fighting erupted between Syrian opposition groups and the Islamic State of Iraq and the Levant (ISIL). In early January 2014, serious clashes between the groups erupted in the north of the country. Opposition groups near Aleppo attacked ISIL in two areas, Atarib and Anadan, which were both strongholds of the fundamentalist Sunni organization. Despite the conflict between ISIL and other rebels, one faction of ISIL has cooperated with the al-Nusra Front and the Green Battalion (a group of Saudi fighters) to combat Hezbollah in the Battle of Qalamoun. By 2018 the Islamic State was destroyed in the territories held by the opposition.

== Background: 2013 ==
In 2013–14, there was some co-operation between ISIL and FSA groups. However, there were conflicts from early 2013. On 5 July 2013, units of the FSA's 33rd Infantry Division were deployed to the town of al-Dana in Idlib Governorate after ISIL fighters opened fire on civilian anti-ISIL protesters. Clashes broke out between the two groups, and resulted in ISIL beheading a commander of the 33rd Division, and taking full control of the town.

In June 2013, clashes erupted in Jarablus between the FSA's Euphrates Jarabulus Battalions and al-Nusra/ISIL, which resulted in ISIL taking full control of Jarabulus. After the capture, the Euphrates Jarabulus Battalions moved its headquarters to the YPG-controlled town of Zur Maghar, and attempted to reenter Jarabulus with other FSA factions but were repelled. It then formed an alliance with the YPG in the Kobane Canton. Some members regrouped into the Jarabulus Brigade, a small independent faction. In July 2013, in the Battle of Tell Abyad, al-Nusra ISIL captured the border town of Tell Abyad from the Kurdish FSA group Jabhat al-Akrad and the YPG.

Tension between FSA groups and ISIL raised sharply in mid 2013. ISIL began moving against the moderate opposition in their stronghold of Raqqa, first by eliminating Raqqa civil leader Abdullah Khalil in April, and then by attacking rival rebel factions in the city. On 13 August, ISIL suicide bombers detonated 4 car bombs at the Ahfad al-Rasul Brigades' headquarters at the Raqqa train station, killing 6 Ahfad al-Rasul fighters, including two commanders, Abu Mazin and Fahd al-Kajwan, and 6 civilians. By 17 August, ISIL had expelled Ahfad al-Rasul from the city. In September of that year, ISIL assassinated the Al-Nusra Front (JAN)-appointed governor of Raqqa, Mohammed Saeed al-Abdullah (also known as "Abu Sa'ad al-Hadrami"), with his body being recovered on September 12. By September 15, ISIL had expelled or neutralized all FSA, Ahrar al-Sham, and JAN-aligned groups in Raqqa. That same month, ISIL attacked and captured the Northern Storm Brigade (FSA)-held border town of Azaz north of Aleppo and the nearby Bab al-Salameh border crossing with Turkey (which served as an important supply route for rebel forces), between 18–23 September 2013. The conflict was renewed over Azaz in early October 2013, and in late November ISIL captured the border town of Atme from the Hawks of Islam Brigade. This came after infighting between the brigade and other FSA groups in the town. During the battle, activists accused the Supreme Military Council of collaborating with ISIL against the Hawks of Islam.

In late 2013, ISIL and FSA Division 13 clashed. In December, ISIL overran a Division 13base in Kafr Nabl, seizing ammunition and weaponry. The following day, the Division's Lieutenant Colonel Ahmad al-Sa’oud was ambushed and captured in Taftanaz by ISIL while he was trying to negotiate for their return. He was released after two weeks. On 31 December 2013, the body of Dr. Hussein Suleiman was handed over in a prisoner swap between ISIL and rival rebel forces. Suleiman was tortured, and died, in ISIL custody. The opposition National Coalition and activists accused ISIL of serving the interests of the Ba'athist Syrian government by tarnishing the image of their uprising.

Full-blown conflict between ISIL and other rebel groups erupted in January 2014. In the first few days of the conflict, al-Nusra Front and Ahrar al-Sham brokered a ceasefire agreement with ISIL in the city of Aleppo and its northern countryside. However, ISIL continued its attacks on other rebel groups and killed more than 24 rebel fighters across northern Syria. The newly created Army of Mujahideen also pledged to fight ISIL in both Aleppo and Idlib.

== Opposition–ISIL conflict, 2014 ==
=== Start of the rebel offensive, ISIL counter-offensive, and mutual advances ===
==== First week ====
On the evening of 2 January 2014, ISIL forces attacked the rebel-held town of Atarib, where they were accused of two incidents of killing or kidnapping mainstream rebel commanders.

On 3 January, several civilian protests, counting hundreds of people, were organized against ISIL and to commemorate the death of Suleiman across the Aleppo Governorate. In the Idlib village of Kafr Takharim, ISIL opened fire on the protesters. There were no reports of casualties. In response to the attack on the protesters, two newly formed Islamist rebel groups of the FSA attacked ISIL positions in more than half a dozen locations in the governorates of Aleppo and Idlib.

Rebels in Atarib managed to repel the ISIL attack on the town, after which the ISIL fighters were surrounded, resulting in the capture of a Tunisian commander, Abu Saber al-Tunisi. It was unclear if he was summarily executed by the rebels. 42 ISIL fighters were wounded in the fighting in Atarib, while an opposition media activist was killed while covering the clashes. There were unconfirmed reports of rebels arresting ISIL members in various towns and villages in the Aleppo Governorate and the Idlib Governorate. Fighting raged in the Idlib village of Maarrat Misrin, while in the village of Kafr Nabl, rebel forces surrounded an ISIL facility, giving its fighters 24 hours to surrender. Meanwhile, the rebel Islamic Front, which was also engaged in the fighting against ISIL, sent reinforcements to the ISIL-held town of Azaz.

On 4 January, ISIL were reported to be rounding up "suspect activists" in both Saraqeb and Kafr Nabl. In the Harem area, ISIL forces executed 30 captives, including civilians, after their base was surrounded by rebel forces. In Aleppo, fighting raged throughout the province, with rebel forces making advances against ISIL. FSA units were reportedly making progress in Atarib, but ISIL was surrounding the town and shelling it.

ISIL was also on the offensive, attacking rebel positions and ambushing their forces in attacks that left 24 rebels dead. One attack included a car bomb. At this point, ISIL gave a 24-hour ultimatum to rebel forces attacking them, saying that they would withdraw from Aleppo, allowing government forces to enter rebel territory, if they did not stop their attacks. The rebels reiterated an earlier call on ISIL fighters to defect to their side.

On 5 January, rebels captured an ISIL base in Manbij after heavy fighting. Clashes had also erupted in the town of Tabqa, in the Raqqa Governorate, and fighting spread to the central Hama Governorate, where ISIL killed seven rebel fighters. During the fighting in Manbij, ISIL used car bombs to defend its territory. Meanwhile, ISIL forces retreated from al-Dana and Atme in the Idlib Governorate, and started heading in the direction of Aleppo. Their positions were overrun by the al-Nusra Front and Ahrar ash-Sham groups, in a possible deal to avoid larger confrontations. ISIL also retreated from Darat Izza, while they managed to retain control of Saraqeb and Kafr Zita. ISIL reinforcements were dispatched from Raqqa to Aleppo. Overall, 66 combatants, including 11 ISIL fighters, were killed during the day.

According to the opposition Sham News Network, by this point, rebels had captured more than 80% of the ISIL-held Idlib countryside and 65% of ISIL territory in Aleppo and its countryside.

By 6 January, rebels had besieged ISIL in its stronghold of Raqqa. During the fighting, rebels released 50 prisoners from ISIL custody. Among those rescued was a Turkish news photographer who had been kidnapped since December 2013. 10 Syrian Kurdish prisoners also managed to escape. 70 ISIL and 20 rebel fighters had been killed since the rebel attack on Raqqa started, according to a rebel officer who expected that it would take them at least a week to drive the al-Qaida linked militants out of the city. Meanwhile, ISIL detonated a car bomb by a rebel checkpoint near the town of Darkush, 20 rebel fighters were killed in the suicide attack on the checkpoint. ISIL fighters retreated from Kafr Zita, In Jarablus, a mile and a half from the Turkish-Syrian border, there were conflicting reports with the Islamic Front stating they had overrun the local ISIL headquarters, with the ISIL denying that and insisting that the group was holding fast.

On 7 January, it was confirmed that 34 foreign ISIL and Jund al-Aqsa fighters had been executed in the previous few days by rebels in the Jabal al-Zawiya area. ISIL retreated from Mayadin in Deir ez-Zor Governorate, without any fighting with rebel forces. East of Rastan, in the Homs Governorate, ISIL attacked a rebel headquarters, killing 15 rebel fighters. During the day, it was revealed that during the previous evening, ISIL executed up to 50 prisoners in the Qadi al-Askar district of Aleppo. The dead included media activists, relief workers, and other civilians. According to the opposition SOHR, 42 people were executed, including, 21 rebel fighters and five media activists.

On 8 January, rebels captured the ISIL headquarters in Aleppo city at the Children's hospital in the Qadi Askar district. ISIL forces lost control over opposition-held areas of the city and retreated to Al-Inzarat on the northeastern outskirts of Aleppo. 300 hostages held by the radical jihadists were set free. In Raqqa, the hospital was abandoned, bodies were lying in the central square and there was no power or water leaving the city "completely paralyzed", according to an opposition activist. At this point, ISIL controlled two key routes out of Raqqa: to the east toward the Iraqi border and also the road north to the Turkish frontier. The head of the al-Nusra Front, Ahmed al-Sharaa, confirmed that fighting had taken place between his organization and ISIL and called for mediation and an end to the "infighting." Late in the day, ISIL started a counterattack, as it launched car bomb assaults targeting opposition checkpoints. Three attacks took place in Al-Bab, Hreitan, and Jarabulus in the Aleppo Governorate, Observatory director Rami Abdel Rahman told AFP. He said similar overnight attacks took place in the Aleppo Governorate, while one occurred in Mayadin in the eastern Deir ez-Zor Governorate. The attack in Al-Bab killed nine people.

==== Second week ====
On 9 January, ISIL sent reinforcements from Deir ez-Zor to back its fighters in the Aleppo countryside. According to local residents, ISIL was preparing many suicide attacks in retaliation for the rebel attacks, and that their commanders were wearing explosive belts all the time. Dutch journalist Lex Runderkamp told Dutch news program NOS that the ISIL reinforcement convoy was 1,300 men strong, including ISIL special forces from Iraq. In Raqqa, the rebels took control of the political intelligence building, which was located 400 meters from the main ISIL headquarters. However, ISIL still controlled the bridges leading into the city, which left people using boats to get into Raqqa, and later in the evening, ISIL forces seized the Mashlab district and an al-Nusra Front base in the city. Clashes erupted between ISIL and a rebel brigade by the Castillo road, in Aleppo Governorate. The rebels blocked an ISIL supply route between al-Jandoul and Castillo. Meanwhile, Islamist rebel brigades sent reinforcements to the Bab al-Salama border crossing, at Azaz, which is primarily controlled by ISIL. In Idlib province, ISIL opened fire on a demonstration in Kafartkharim and besieged several field clinics, and stormed one of them, searching for rebels injured earlier in the morning during clashes in Atarib.

According to SOHR, local ISIL forces signed a truce with the Islamic Front and several independent Islamist rebel units in Al-Hasakah Governorate. They agreed with the establishment of a single military command center and legal authority for the area.

On 10 January, ISIL managed to push back rebel forces on the eastern approaches to Raqqa. ISIL forces also killed 20 rebel fighters in fighting in the town of Al-Bab in Aleppo province, and managed to capture wheat silos and mills just outside the town. ISIL commander Abu Omar al-Shishani entered the town with a convoy of 30 vehicles and troops after he lifted the ISIL's siege of Deir-az-Zor airport.

On 11 January, rebels moved a convoy including tanks and technicals to Saraqeb in preparation to push ISIL out. Heavy fighting erupted and it was reported that rebels took over most of the town, and besieged hundreds of ISIL fighters. Earlier in the day, five rebels were killed on the outskirts of Saraqeb when their car hit a bomb. Meanwhile, ISIL forces managed to capture the border town of Tal Abyad, while in Raqqa ISIL fighters captured a rebel checkpoint and the train station. ISIL fighters also dumped the corpses of dozens of their foes at the village of Jazra, to the west of Raqqa. Dozens of bodies of ISIL fighters were also reportedly in Raqqa's hospital. Rebels managed to regain territory lost in previous days in Aleppo province and were defending against ISIL counterattacks. 20 rebels were killed in fighting in the town of Anadan, while 30 rebels were killed in three days of fighting in the village of al-Tiba, northeast of Sekhna.

On 12 January, it was confirmed that rebel forces had captured the eastern part of Saraqeb with the local ISIL commander surrounded with his fighters in the center of the town. Fighting was still continuing in Raqqa between ISIL and remnants of rebel units, including the al-Nusra Front, although by this point ISIL had captured much of the city. According to an opposition activist, 95 percent of Raqqa and its countryside were under ISIL control. ISIL forces had also captured the towns of Hrietan and Basraton in Aleppo province. It was also reported that the bodies of 70 rebels were delivered to Raqqa's hospital after they were executed by ISIL following their capture of Tal Abyad. Another report put the number of executed prisoners at 100.

On 13 January, it was reported that ISIL had won the battle of Raqqa, capturing most of the province and the provincial capital. ISIL had also captured Al-Bab and Beza'a, while the rebels were gaining ground in Jarabulus, near the Turkish border. Another mass execution of prisoners was also reported near the village of Kantari, about 80 kilometers north of Raqqa, when ISIL killed 46 captured fighters of the Ahrar ash-Sham rebel group. 14 rebels were also executed in Homs province

On 14 January, it was reported that rebels captured the villages of Masqan, Kafar Kalbin and Kafra in Aleppo province, while the ISIL has taken full control of Raqqa city, after the last remaining rebels retreated. Meanwhile, the rebels also captured the prison in Jarablus, releasing 70 prisoners from ISIL custody.

On 15 January, an ISIL car bomb in Jarablus killed 26 people, of which 23 were rebel fighters and three were civilians. Meanwhile, in Saraqeb fighting was continuing and opposition sources reported that the local ISIL commander, a Belgian, was killed. ISIL denied the claim. Between 15 and 17 January, rebels captured Jibreen, Hardntin Kfarrakeshr, Sheikh Ali, Aajel, 46th base, Orum al-Sughra and Reef al-Muhandiseen, while the ISIL retreated from the village of Kafarjoum, which holds the largest ISIL arms depots in all of Syria. ISIL also withdrew from Saraqab, burning their vehicles as they retreated, while at the same time ISIL recaptured Jarabulus.

==== Third week ====
On 20 January, 2 suicide cars exploded at the Bab Al-Hawa border crossing, 16 people including six rebels were killed. The same day, ISIL forces seized control of the Al-Jarah military airport. In Manbij, a large suicide car explosion killed 20 people, including rebels, women, and children By 23 January, ISIL was in full control of Manbij and completely secured Darkush the following day.

==== Fourth week ====
On 27 January, it was reported that ISIL senior Commander Sameer Abid Mohammed al-Halefawi (aka Haji Bakr) was killed by rebels in Tal Rifaat, near Azaz, and at least two other ISIL senior commanders were captured at Hreitan. Four ISIL fighters and three rebels were killed in the fighting. ISIL confirmed the death of top ISIL leader Haji Bakr on 2 February.

=== Al Qaeda breaks links with ISIL and al-Nusra Front joins the fight ===
On 1 February, ISIL attacked the headquarters of the al-Tawhid Brigade in Aleppo, killing the brigade commander Adnan Bakour and 15 other rebels at the cost of at least 9 ISIL fighters. The next day, al-Qaeda distanced itself from ISIL and its actions in Syria.

On 3 February, the Raqqa Revolutionaries Brigade launched a military operation against ISIL checkpoints and strongholds in Raqqa. The day before, five ISIL fighters were assassinated in the Raqqa national hospital.

On 5 February, a local group of Suqour al-Sham brigade in Hama and ISIL signed a truce, It was also reported that The Front of Aleppo Islamic Scholars issued a statement, giving the ISIL fighters in Syria a three-day ultimatum to either return to Iraq or join other armed factions fighting against the Syrian government.

On 8 February, the al-Nusra Front and allied rebel factions launched an offensive against the ISIL in the Deir ez-Zor Governorate. It was reported that the ISIL emir of Deir al-Zor, Abu Dajana, was killed in the clashes and the rebels also recaptured facilities in the province. At the same time, 13 foreign ISIL fighters defected in Raqqa. Between 10 and 12 February, ISIL had almost completely withdrawn from the eastern province of Deir ez-Zor, including the city of Deir ez-Zor.

=== Northern Aleppo fighting ===
On 13 February 2014, the Kurdish Front Brigade, the Northern Storm Brigade, and the Descendants of Messengers Brigade declared the beginning of a battle to recapture Azaz and the rest of northern Aleppo from ISIL, code named the Battle of Dignity. The groups declared the front to be a military exclusion zone and warned civilians to leave the area. The first clashes began in the village of Maryamin, Afrin and resulted in the Kurdish Front capturing the village. Clashes spread to Deir Jamal and several other villages. The top commander of the Kurdish Front, Alaa Ajabu, was killed in action during the fighting 4 days later.

On 14 February, Kurdish and rebel groups united in the Euphrates Islamic Liberation Front, which formed the basis for the later Euphrates Volcano operations room.

On 23 February, two ISIL suicide bombers killed a number of rebels in Aleppo, including Abu Khaled al-Suri, who was Al-Qaeda's representative in Syria and top-commander in the rebel group Ahrar ash-Sham. Three days later, the Tunisian ISIL deputy Emir for the Raqqa province and three other fighters were killed by a roadside bomb, while rebels captured the village of Kafrnaya in Aleppo. It was also reported that ISIL released a rebel commander in Raqqa.

By 28 February, ISIL forces withdrew from Azaz, Menagh Military Airbase, the Mayer region and the villages of Deir Jamal and Kafin, toward Raqqa. ISIL forces from the area retreated to their strongholds of al-Bab, Jarabulus and Manbij in eastern Aleppo. Jabhat al-Akrad, the Northern Storm Brigade, and al-Tawhid Brigade took Azaz.

=== ISIL retreats from Idlib and Latakia ===
On 3 March, SOHR reported that ISIL was responsible for the kidnapping of the commander of the rebel "United Front for Southern Damascus" in February 2014.

On 11 March, ISIL massacred at least 22 people, including 12 rebels, after they captured the village of Shuyukh near Jarabulus. During this time, ISIL had also captured the town of Karakozak, in Aleppo province near the Turkish border. The next day, the ISIL emir Abu Mouhammad Al-Massri was assassinated by the FSA affiliated Al-Raqqa Revolutionaries Brigade in the Raqqa's Tal-Dikan area, near the village of Sarreen.

On 14 March, it was reported that ISIL fully retreated from Idlib and Latakia provinces.

On 16 March, according to local sources a number of foreign ISIL fighters defected to Al-Nusra after they killed their commander. The next day, Al-Nusra and the Islamic Front were able to capture the al-Thalja barrier, resulting in the ISIL withdrawal towards Markada town.

On 27 March, ISIL launched an operation against Al-Nusra and allied forces at the al-Jafra oil field and the Koniko gas factory in Reef Deir Izzor. SOHR confirmed that the ISIL took hold of these facilities, but were forced to withdraw after heavy clashes two days later. On 29 March, ISIL captured the town of Markada, after the rebels retreated to Al-Sor town in the eastern countryside of Der-Ezzor. At least 35 rebels were reportedly killed by the ISIL in the fighting and many rebels were captured. The SOHR confirmed the death of at least seven ISIL fighters.

=== ISIL's Deir ez-Zor offensive ===
On 10 April, ISIL launched an offensive against rebels (including al-Nusra, the Islamic Front, Army of Mujahedeen, the FSA and Syria Revolutionaries Front) in Deir ez-Zor Governorate launched a three-pronged assault on rebel positions in and near the border town of Albu Kamal and reportedly took control of parts of the town. On 16 April 2014, ISIL killed al-Nusra's Idlib chief Abu Mohammad al-Ansari together with his family, the Syrian Observatory for Human Rights reported.

Between 10 and 13 May, ISIL gained control of important parts of Eastern Deir ez-Zor province and districts of Deir ez-Zor city from rival rebel forces. and gained control of at least five villages in the northern countryside of Al-Raqqa province. ISIL also executed the military commander of the Al-Raqqa rebel brigade and his nephew near Ayn Issa in Al-Raqqa province.

On 16 May 2014, 9 rebel groups formed the "Free Syria Operations Room", announced the beginning of the "Battle of Northern Earthquake", and declared the northern and eastern countrysides of Aleppo a military zone. Clashes took place in and near the town of al-Rai. ISIL reinforcements then arrived in al-Rai from Jarabulus to fight the rebels.

By late May, 3,000 ISIL fighters were involved in the offensive in Deir ez-Zor and gained control of the Al-Kharrat oil terminal in Deir ez-Zor province.

On 2 June, ISIL took full control of Al-Besera, while at the same time the rebels counterattacked, reclaiming 16 villages.

On 5 June, ISIL gained control of the entire western countryside of Deir ez-Zor after al-Nusra forces withdrew following an assault by Chechen and Afghan ISIL fighters. On 8 June, the FSA reportedly assassinated the ISIL emir of Homs. By 10 June, the offensive into Deir ez-Zor had expanded and ISIL had reportedly driven Al-Nusra and aligned militants from nearly all of the province north of the Euphrates.

Since the start of the ISIL offensive in Deir ez-Zor, the pace of defections from the opposition to ISIL had accelerated, most significantly in the town of Al-Muhasan and adjacent villages, where a mass defection by the rebel garrison granted ISIL uncontested control over a key route to the provincial capital.

Between 21 and 22 June, ISIL captured eight towns in the northern part of Aleppo governorate, with the help of American-made Humvees seized in Iraq. Two of the towns were located near the town of Azaz on the border with Turkey.

Between 1 and 3 July, ISIL, bolstered by reinforcements from Iraq, captured Abu Kamal, Mayadin and Shuhail. ISIL also gained control of Syria's largest oil field, al-Omar in Deir ez-Zor province, after al-Nusra forces fled the facility. By this point, the entirety of the province with the exception of the provincial capital, its airport, and a few villages had fallen to ISIL. Following this, ISIL captured the villages of Quniya and Buqris, close to the town of Mayadin.

In July 2014, ISIL launched a large-scale counter-offensive and recaptured the village of Bahwartah, north of Akhtarin, as well as 5 other villages. However, the al-Nusra Front and the Tawhid Brigade soon recaptured 3 of these villages. In response to the ISIL offensive, 11 rebel groups threatened to withdraw from the frontlines in the area due to the lack of support.

On 14 July, ISIL expelled Nusra and other assorted rebel groups from all rebel-controlled neighborhoods in Deir ez-Zor city. By this stage, ISIL controlled between 95% and 98% of Deir Ez-Zor province.

=== East Ghouta fighting ===
On 1 July 2014, clashes erupted between Jaysh al-Islam and ISIL in the Eastern Ghouta town of Medaa. ISIL captured 25 of their fighters and executed an unknown number of them. The next day, Jaysh al-Islam reportedly expelled ISIL fighters from the Ghouta town of Maydaa in Damascus province.

One week later, a key commander of Jaysh al-Islam, Abu Mohammad Haroun, was assassinated by ISIL by a roadside bomb in the Ghouta suburbs.

Following ISIL's victory in Deir ez-Zor, it was reported that the entirety of Dawoud Brigade, a thousand strong division of the Jaysh al-Sham defected to ISIL. The defection of Dawud is reported to have bolstered ISIL forces in Raqqa with more than a hundred combat vehicles, at least ten of them tanks.

=== Aleppo fighting ===
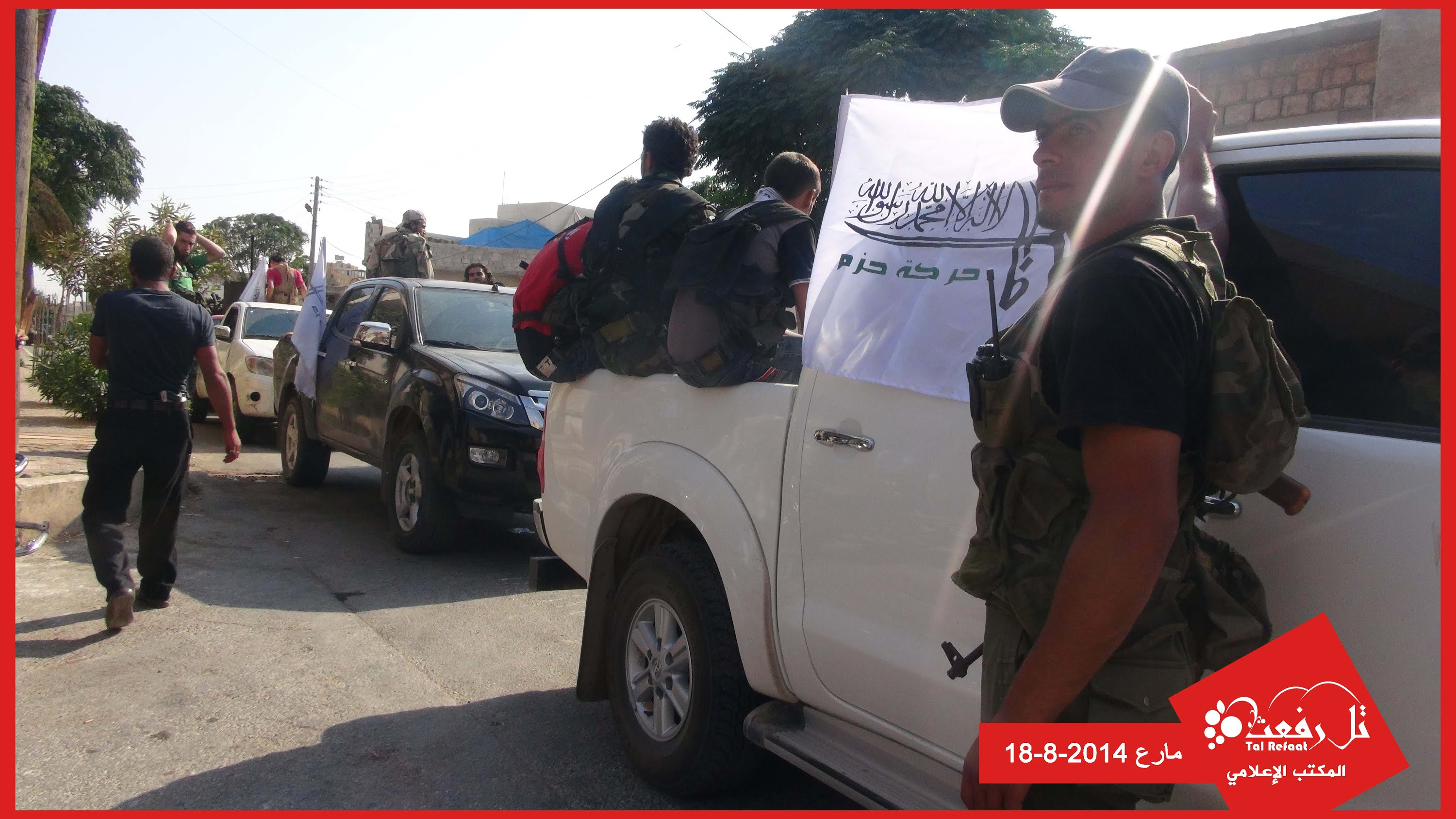
A convoy of Hazzm Movement fighters reinforcing the town of Mare' against ISIL on 18 August 2014.

On 8 July, Idlib-based rebel groups formed a “quick response unit” of 600 fighters pledging to support rebels in fighting the government and ISIL in Aleppo; its members included the Syrian Revolutionaries’ Front, Jabhat al-Nusra, Sham Legion, Suqour al-Sham, Harakat Hazm, FSA 13th Division, Fursan al-Haq, and Jabhat Thuwar Saraqib.

On 13 August 2014, it was reported that IS seized control of eight villages and several towns in Aleppo province from rebels, including Turkmen Barah and Akhtarin; the fighting reportedly killed 40 rebel fighters and 12 IS members. By 16 August, IS captured around 10 villages and towns and was advancing towards Marea and Azaz. Fighting raged near Marea, the main base of Islamic Front rebel group, where rebel reinforcements were being sent. During the day, IS forces captured three villages near Marea. Additionally, by 18 August opposition sources had reported the mass defection of the Aleppo-based Khaled Rashed, Green and Tawhid-e-jihad brigades to the Islamic State. On 24 August, rebels recaptured two villages, and on 27 August, started an offensive called Nahrwan Al-Sham to expel IS from the northern and eastern Aleppo countryside; opposition sources claimed that rebels had regained control of several villages and killed 43 IS fighters.

In early April 2015, ISIL bolstered its forces in the northern Aleppo countryside after having withdrawn significant quantities of war material just two months before. A double car bomb attack killed 31 rebels near Aleppo.

On 31 May, ISIL seized the town of Sawran and numerous other villages from the rebels, leaving them just 30 miles away from the Bab al Salam border crossing. The militants beheaded captured rebel fighters in the seized villages and kidnapped their families. Fighting raged all along the 35 mile frontline as the militants pressed towards Azaz; rebels reportedly requested coalition air support and received none.

As Turkey announced plans for a rebel controlled 'buffer zone' in northern Aleppo to counter the Islamic State, Syrian rebels expressed skepticism that the Turkish plans would impact the battle, claiming the coalition had not consulted them. Fighters from the US trained "Division 30" were reported to have entered Syria and taken positions in Azaz with the intention of coordinating with rebel groups to push back ISIL. The United States and Turkey continued to disagree over which rebel groups should be provided with support.

On 30 July, seven Nusra fighters were killed when a car bomb exploded at a checkpoint near the town of Malikiya. Clashes subsequently broke out between Nusra and ISIL. On 9 August, ISIL captured the village of Umma Housh, a village that lies along a rebel supply line into Aleppo, after a night time assault involving two suicide bombers, killing at least 37 rebels and 10 ISIL fighters. On 10 August, Nusra announced it was withdrawing from the frontline with ISIL in protest over Turkish and US plans for a safezone in Aleppo province.

On 27 August, ISIL launched a major offensive on the opposition bastion of Marea. ISIL fighters captured two villages that Nusra had withdrawn from while taking three villages neighboring Marea, enveloping it in a pincer movement on three sides and killing dozens. On 5 September, ISIL pushed into Marea from the north, rebels entrenched in the town attempted to resist as ferocious fighting killed 47 on both sides. On 8 September, it was reported that the rebels had managed to push ISIL back to the outskirts of the town, but were still surrounded on three sides. ISIL was pounding Marea with high-powered weaponry, suicide bombs, artillery, and chemical weapons. US airstrikes were intensifying around the town in an attempt to halt the jihadist advance.

On 9 October, ISIL captured five villages as well as the Infantry School on the outskirts of Aleppo in a lightning attack that brought them to within 10 miles of the city Later that day, Ahrar al Sham managed to recapture one of the villages and was battling to regain a second.

=== Attempted mediation ===
On 19 January 2014, ISIL reached out to other rebel groups in Syria to stop the rebel in-fighting, by posting an audio message online. On 4 April, Al-Qaeda chief Ayman al-Zawahri called on the rival jihadists and rebels to end the infighting, stating that the violence is "sedition". In early May, Ayman al-Zawahiri again called on ISIL and the al-Nusra Front to stop their fighting. However, fighting continued between the two groups. The al-Nusra Front issued a statement on 4 May 2014 in which it agreed to stop fighting with ISIL, however, it stated that it will retaliate if ISIL attacks first. In May 2014, ISIL launched an offensive against Al-Nusra and allied groups in Deir ez-Zor Governorate, seizing oil wells and leaving hundreds dead on both sides.

In September 2014, moderate rebels and the Islamic State signed a non-aggression pact in Al-Hajar al-Aswad. However, the report of a truce has been denied by the Islamic Front, the Syria Revolutionaries Front, and other rebel groups.

=== Kobanî ===
In the summer of 2014, ISIL began taking over the area south of the Turkish border and then started to besiege the town of Kobanî. The Kurdish People's Protection Units were assisted by the FSA groups Dawn of Freedom Brigades, Liwa Thuwwar al-Raqqa, the Al-Qassas Army and the Jarabulus Brigade during the defense of Kobanî against ISIL.

On 26 January 2015, YPG and rebels recaptured the town of Kobani.

Meanwhile, in September 2014, the Euphrates Volcano Kurdish-rebel alliance was formed, including FSA groups such as Jarabulus Company, Retribution Army, Army of Revolutionaries, Liberation Brigade, Jihad in the Path of God Brigade, and Tawhid Brigades.

== 2015 ==
=== US involvement, FSA–Kurdish co-operation ===
The US gave limited backing to some vetted rebel groups against ISIL. In 2015, around 200 rebels were armed and trained by the US via the Syrian Train and Equip Program and deployed against ISIL from Turkey and Jordan. The Army of Revolutionaries (Jaysh al-Thuwar) was formed in May 2015 by rebel groups (including the Syrian Revolutionaries Front, Northern Sun Battalion, Jabhat al-Akrad and Seljuk Brigade) who wanted to fight ISIL but did not participate in the Train and Equip program because of its exclusive focus on ISIL.

The Battle of Sarrin (June–July 2015) was a military operation launched on 18 June in the northeastern Aleppo Governorate in which the Kurdish YPG and Free Syrian Army forces captured the town of Sarrin and the surrounding region from ISIL, backed by US airstrikes. The capture of Tell Abyad from ISIL in July 2015 was a major success of the Euphrates Volcano operations room.

On 10 October 2015, the Euphrates Volcano was one of the founding members of the Syrian Democratic Forces (SDF), which brought together FSA units and Kurdish groups. One of the first SDF offensives was the 2015 al-Hawl offensive during November, in which Liwa Thuwar al-Raqqa, Al-Tahrir Brigade and Jaysh al-Thuwar, as well as Kurdish forces and international volunteers from the International Freedom Battalion took strategically important territory from ISIL in al-Hawl in al-Hasakah Governorate with CJTF–OIR air support.

=== Battle for Eastern Qalamoun and Yarmouk ===
In 2015, most of the fighting between the rebels and ISIL took place in the Rif Dimashq Governorate, while some factions from both parties chose to fight together against the Syrian Army, Lebanese Army and Hezbollah in the border area with Lebanon.

On 26 February 2015, ISIL fighters attacked rebels in the area of Dakwa, in the countryside east of Damascus, and took control of it.

On 13 March 2015, a rebel joint-force consisting of Jaysh Usud al-Sharqiya, Ahmad al-Abdo Martyrs Brigades and Battalions, al-Nusra Front, Jaysh al-Islam and Ahrar ash-Sham launched an offensive against ISIL in the eastern Qalamoun area. They reportedly captured the Bir al-Mahrotha area and killed the ISIL leader Abu Haidara Al-Tounisi that day. Two days later, the rebels captured "wide parts" of the al-Zarka area and the al-Qaryatayn mountains from ISIL.

On 19 March 2015, rebels attacked ISIL positions in al-Kafat area, after an al-Nusra Front suicide attack, and reportedly advanced.

On 1 April 2015, ISIL, reportedly facilitated by Nusra's local wing, stormed Yarmouk refugee camp in the area outlying central Damascus. Quickly taking control of wide swaths of the camp, the militants engaged in drawn out battles with anti-Assad rebel fighters and the Hamas affiliated Aknaf Bait al-Maqdis before a rebel offensive managed to regain some of the camp the next day. However, ISIL militants re-entered the camp the following day and seized up to 90% of it.

On 5 April 2015, rebels announced an offensive against ISIL in the Syrian desert and reportedly captured the Alyaniah mountains. The SOHR reported that seven fighters from both sides were killed in the al-Mahesa area. Three rebels were captured by ISIL as well.

On 12 April, Jaysh al-Islam and allied forces launched a counter-attack on the ISIL-held Hajar al-Aswad district. On 17 April, Jaysh al-Islam and the 1st Brigade also launched an offensive against ISIL in the neighborhoods of al-Qaboun, Jobar and Barzah.

On 22 April, ISIL captured wide parts of al-Mahsa area, in the eastern Qalamoun, and cut off the rebel supply line between Jordanian border and the Syrian al-Badia. According to one report, 30 rebels and at least 12 ISIL militants were killed, while another stated nearly 100 rebels were dead or missing. A pro-opposition source stated ISIL recaptured all areas they lost to the rebels in the previous four months.

=== Southern Syria fighting ===
Between 27 and 29 April 2015, fighting raged south of Quneitra city, near the Israeli-held Golan Heights, between an ISIL-linked rebel group Jaysh al-Jihad on one side and al-Nusra and FSA fighters on the other. The clashes started after a pair of Jaysh al-Jihad ambushes on rebel convoys preparing an offensive against government forces. The rebels besieged 200 Jaysh al-Jihad fighters in the village of al-Qahtania and took control of wide areas the group controlled. On 29 April, fighting also erupted in Daraa province between al-Nusra and the Yarmouk Martyrs Brigade, which was accused the previous month of also pledging allegiance to ISIL. The Yarmouk Martyrs Brigade captured an al-Nusra post in the town of Sahem al-Jolan. On 30 April, rebel forces captured the Quneitra border crossing from the Jaysh al-Jihad and on 5 May, al-Qahtania. Overall, the fighting left 59 rebels, 32 Jaysh al-Jihad fighters and two members of Yarmouk Martyrs Brigade dead.

== 2016: Al-Tanf, Abu Kamal, Dabiq, al-Rai and al-Bab ==
Operation Euphrates Shield was a cross-border operation by the Turkish military and Turkey-aligned Syrian opposition groups in the Syrian Civil War which led to the Turkish occupation of northern Syria. Operations were carried out in the region between the Euphrates river to the east and the rebel-held area around Azaz to the west by the Turkish military and Turkey-aligned Syrian rebel groups, some of which used the Free Syrian Army label.

The Al-Tanf offensive (2016) was an offensive launched on 3 March by the FSA Southern Front, backed by the US, against ISIL, aiming to capture the Syrian border post Al-Tanf. After several hours of fighting the rebels captured the border post. However, a counter-attack took place, which led to ISIL recapturing the post several hours later. Al-Tanf was recaptured by rebels, and on 28 June the 2016 Abu Kamal offensive, also known as Operation Day of Wrath, was launched from al-Tanf on the town of Abu Kamal on the Syrian–Iraqi border, led by the US-backed New Syrian Army (NSA). The offensive was a failure.

The Daraa offensive (March–April 2016) was a military operation of two ISIL-affiliated groups, the Yarmouk Martyrs Brigade and the Islamic Muthanna Movement, against Southern Front forces in the Daraa Governorate, which was a significant victory for the rebels and ended with the destruction of the Islamic Muthanna Movement.

The Northern Aleppo offensive (March–June 2016) saw significant FSA advances against ISIL. In March, Ahrar ash-Sham and the Sultan Murad Brigade advanced in the villages of Dudyan, Toqli and Mregel. On 1 April, ISIL launched an offensive toward the Levant Front headquarters in the outskirts of Mregel. The attack was repelled by the Sham Legion and the Falcons of Mount Zawiya Brigade who then advanced and took new territory. Two days later, the al-Moutasem Brigade, the Sultan Murad Brigade, and the Sham Legion launched an offensive toward the ISIL stronghold of al-Rai to the east, capturing eight villages and reached within four kilometers from al-Rai by 4 April. As of 5 April, the rebels had captured at least 16 villages in the area. On 7 April, with Turkish close air support, the rebels captured most of al-Rai and the nearby border crossing. The FSA's Al-Mu'tasim Brigade, Sham Legion and Sultan Murad Division captured further territory from ISIL in April. In June Al-Mu'tasim Brigade formed an alliance with Liwa Ahfad Saladin and 6 other rebel groups in Mare' after breaking an ISIL siege on the town. The new coalition claimed to have 1,500 fighters under a unified military command, and established contact with the rival Syrian Democratic Forces. Further fighting around Azaz was indecisive, with rebels holding some ground due to Turkish artillery support.

In the second phase of Operation Euphrates Shield, the Battle of al-Rai was fought in August 2016 between FSA groups including the Hamza Division and Al-Mu'tasim Brigade (backed by the US from the air and by Turkey), and ISIL in the border town of al-Rai, part of the northern Aleppo Governorate on the border with Turkey, which resulted in the FSA capturing the town.

Turkish Special Forces and rebel fighters including the Sham Legion captured Jarabulus on 24 August. On 30 August, SDF forces with coalition support started the Western al-Bab offensive against ISIL in the southwest of the region. ISIL launched a massive counterattack in the southwestern countryside of Jarabulus preceded by a suicide attack. The militants captured four villages (Kiliyeh, Arab Hasan Saghir, Al-Muhsinli, and Al-Bulduq) from both the SDF and Turkish-backed rebels. The Sham Legion and the Hamza Division advanced from al-Rai in September, capturing land from ISIL. Syrian civilians began to return to FSA-controlled Jarabulus in late September.

On 16 September, US special operations forces entered northern Aleppo as part of a new US mission known as "Operation Noble Lance" to provide training, advice and assistance to the rebels against ISIL and to call in US airstrikes in support of the rebels as they advanced. Turkish-backed forces initiated the Northern al-Bab offensive (2016) against ISIL. Advances were made by the Turkmen group Sultan Murad Division.

The Northern al-Bab offensive (September 2016) was a Turkish-backed FSA offensive, part of the third phase of Operation Euphrates Shield, which advanced 16–20 September and 23–27 September, involving the FSA's 13th Division and other groups. The 2016 Dabiq offensive was a military offensive launched by the Turkish Armed Forces and factions from FSA (including Sultan Murad Division) and allied groups, with the goal of capturing the town of Dabiq, north of Aleppo from Islamic State in Iraq and the Levant (ISIL). It began in September and resulted in the capture of Dabiq by Turkish/FSA-allied forces on 16 October.

On 6 November, the rebels supported by Turkish planes and artillery advanced south towards al-Bab, entering the northern outskirts of the city on 14 November. The US-led coalition did not support the offensive as it was an independent Turkish operation.

The Syrian Desert campaign (December 2016–April 2017) was a military campaign launched by rebel forces affiliated with the FSA Southern Front and their allies in the southern Syrian Desert and the eastern Qalamoun Mountains. The aim of the offensive was to expel the ISIL from the desert in southern Syria and to open a supply route between two rebel-held areas. It culminated in a significant rebel victory.

== 2017–18: Turkish support for rebels, Northwestern Syria campaign ==
The Battle of al-Bab continued into 2017. Turkish air support boosted the operation, but Russian and Syrian airstrikes targeted Turkish-backed forces fighting ISIL. Al-Bab was completely captured from ISIL by Turkish-backed rebels on 23 February, along with the towns of Qabasin and Bizaah.

By this time, US support for anti-ISIL forces was primarily channeled through the Syrian Democratic Forces, including the Manbij Military Council, rather than the FSA. In the East Aleppo offensive (January–March 2017), government forces, SDF and Turkish-backed forces vied for control of territories taken from ISIL.

The Southwestern Daraa offensive (February 2017) took place between 20 and 27 February, involving the FSA's Southern Front fighting alongside HTS. In the Yarmouk basin area the FSA came under attack by Khalid ibn al-Walid Army on 21 February 2017, taking advantage of the FSA's focus on the Daraa offensive (February–June 2017). Battles was waged around the Golan Heights. In Daraa's southwest Jibleen and al-Mazir'ah were lost by the Syrian rebels to ISIS. The rebels lost weapons to the Khalid bin al-Walid army. In the Yarmouk Basin the rebels suffered 104 deaths according to the Khalid bin al-Walid army. Rebels in Deraa's southwest lost villages to the Khalid bin al-Walid army. In Tasil, Qasim al-Ghabaiti died. Tell Jumou was recaptured by rebels. Rebels recaptured Tell Ashtarah. Tel Astrh based points of the Jaysh Khalid ibn al-Walid were bombarded by the Southern Front Free Syrian Army's Hamza Brigade. In Dar'aa ISIS and the Southern Front battled each other. Fighting resumed sporadically, with minor advances and retreats by the rebels' Nawa Operations Room in April, May, June and September 2017 (see

In late 2017, ISIL launched its Northwestern Syria campaign (October 2017–February 2018). On 9 October, ISIL attacked HTS in the northeastern Hama countryside near the southern administrative border of the Idlib Governorate, having infiltrated the area via government-controlled territory. In the fighting, HTS were simultaneously attacked and defeated by government and ISIL fighters, then in January/February the army turned its focus against ISIL, capturing their pocket of control on 9 February and pushing through a corridor into rebel-held territory in Idlib, where they were defeated by the "Repel the Invaders" alliance of rebels.

Meanwhile, in the Southern Damascus offensive (January–February 2018), Jaysh al-Islam unsuccessfully tried to take ISIL territory south of Damascus. In the Southern Damascus offensive (March 2018), ISIL attacked a rebel pocket in the al-Qadam neighborhood of southern Damascus just as the rebels were surrendering the area to government forces.

== Jund al-Aqsa, 2014–2017 ==
In 2014, it was reported that Jund al-Aqsa was receiving continuous funding from wealthy private Gulf donors for their refusal to attack other rebel groups, part of which was the reason for their rift with al-Nusra Front and Ahrar al-Sham. They reformed after previously fighting the Islamic State of Iraq and the Levant, who hurt the group and also caused them to run into some debt. These Gulf donors, who financed them for this reason, refused to finance groups involved in intra-rebel fighting.

On 23 October 2015, Jund al-Aqsa left the Army of Conquest, because it had misgivings about fighting against the Islamic State of Iraq and the Levant, while reaffirming its loyalty to al-Qaeda. On 17 February 2016, over 400 fighters and senior leaders of Jund al-Aqsa defected to al-Nusra Front.

SOHR claimed that Jund al-Aqsa joined the 2016 Idlib Governorate clashes and established checkpoints in support of JaN. According to the 13th Division's media wing, their position was overran and 4 of their fighters were killed.

In October 2016, clashes between Jund al-Aqsa and Ahrar al-Sham escalated throughout the Idlib Governorate, with both sides expelling each other from several towns and villages, according to al-Masdar. During the clashes 800 other rebels reportedly defected to Jund al-Aqsa, increasing the group's strength up to 1,600 fighters. During the clashes in Idlib, the group aided al-Nusra Front by sending them two suicide bombers of Kuwaiti and Saudi origins.

On 25 December 2016, 2 Free Idlib Army commanders were shot and killed in Maarat. Opposition activists cited by Al-Masdar accused Jund al-Aqsa of conducting the assassination. The next day, the al-Nusra Front raided houses throughout Idlib and captured 16 FIA fighters from the Mountain Hawks Brigade. The rebels were captured on charges of participating in the Turkish military intervention in Syria.

As a result of the clashes, the group pledged allegiance to Jabhat Fatah al-Sham. This group was a relaunched version of al-Nusra Front, only changing their name in July 2016. The leaders of Jabhat Fateh al-Sham (JFS) and Jund al-Aqsa signed their names in a text agreement to pledge their allegiance. However, shortly after, an agreement between JFS and Ahrar al-Sham was posted on the Syrian opposition website, stating that Jund al Aqsa would be dissolved and completely incorporated with JFS, whereby preventing it from reconstructing independently under any other name or form.

The group has stated its continued loyalty to Ayman al Zawahiri for his eminence as the sheikh of the modern mujahedeen, according to them. Within the past three years, the group has assisted al-Qaeda in toppling the Syrian Revolutionaries Front and the Hazzm Movement, two key Western-backed rebel organizations in Syria, as well as weaken a third called Division 13.

Some sources believe that the original rift from al-Nusra Front was part of a Qatar-led effort to rebrand al-Nusra Front, and provide it with new support, a move that could increase external aid for the terrorist group. Another analysis of Jund al Aqsa's rift and reunification states that it's a reflection of al-Qaeda's strategy of downplaying its official ties to these groups, and a strategy of diversifying its investments, especially with regards to affiliations with Qatar and Kuwait and the lack of political will in their countries to combat terrorism and terror financing.

On 7 February 2017, Jund al-Aqsa attacked the headquarters of Jaysh al-Nasr near the town of Murak in northern Hama. Jund al-Aqsa captured more than 250 fighters from Jaysh al-Nasr. By 9 February, Jund al-Aqsa had captured 17 towns and villages from the Free Syrian Army and Tahrir al-Sham, in the northern Hama Province.

On 13 February 2017, clashes erupted between the Tahrir al-Sham and Liwa al-Aqsa (Jund al-Aqsa's new brand) in northern Hama and southern Idlib. It was rumored that Liwa al-Aqsa pledged allegiance to the Islamic State of Iraq and the Levant, sparking the clashes with Tahrir al-Sham, known as a staunch ISIL opponent.

On 14 February 2017, Jund al-Aqsa executed more than 170 prisoners of war, including both HTS fighters, FSA fighters, and civilians. Kafr Nuboudah and Kafr Zita villages were the origin of the Jaysh Nasr members whom Liwa al-Aqsa executed, according to Moussa al-Omar. The casualties given for Jaysh Nasr were 56 fighters, three media reporters, and 11 military chiefs, according to al-Omar. After Jund al-Aqsa committed the slaughter at Khan Shaykhun, only one person lived to tell the tale. On the next day, HTS captured the village of Heish from Jund al-Aqsa, and then besieged the retreating Jund al-Aqsa forces in Khan Shaykhun and Murak.

On 19 February 2017, it was reported that 600 Jund al-Aqsa militants would be transported to the Ar-Raqqah Governorate to join ISIL, while the remaining Jund al-Aqsa forces would surrender their heavy weapons and join the Turkistan Islamic Party within 72 hours. It was also reported that over 250 Free Syrian Army and Tahrir al-Sham fighters had been killed in clashes by Jund al-Aqsa. On the afternoon of 19 February, a convoy of Jund al-Aqsa members and their relatives tried to cross from the Idlib Province into the Raqqa Governorate across a Syrian government supply route to Aleppo, stretching from Ithriyah to Salamiyah, in order to escape the rebel infighting in the restive Idlib Governorate. However, they were ambushed by the National Defence Forces, resulting in several deaths, with the rest of the militants surrendering themselves.

On 22 February, the last of Liwa al-Asqa's 2,100 militants left their final positions in Khan Shaykhun, with unconfirmed reports in pro-government media that they were to join ISIL in the Ar-Raqqah Province after a negotiated withdrawal deal with Tahrir al-Sham and the Turkistan Islamic Party. Afterward, Tahrir al-Sham declared terminating Liwa al-Aqsa, and promised to watch for any remaining cells. On 23 February, the relatives of FSA prisoners executed by Liwa al-Aqsa accused the group of treating them worse than the Syrian regime ever did.

On 9 July 2017, Tahrir al-Sham, utilizing over 1,000 fighters, performed raids in the Idlib Governorate against alleged ISIL and Jund al-Aqsa sleeper cells, arresting over 100 fighters.

== Casualties ==
Between 3 January and 28 June 2014, 5,641–6,991 people had been killed in the rebel v ISIL fighting, according to the Syrian Observatory for Human Rights. By 25 February 2014, ISIL had conducted 34 suicide attacks. On 26 August 2014, the Syrian Network for Human rights reported that since the declaration of the Islamic State on 9 April, 2,691 anti-ISIL rebels and 782 civilians had been killed.

Between 28 June 2014 and 29 February 2016, Islamic State militants executed a total of 4,225 people: 2,262 civilians, 1,159 government soldiers, 464 Islamic State deserters, 322 rebel and Kurdish fighters, 7 alleged government spies (including a child), 5 Iraqi citizens, 3 military deserters and one former ISIL member.
