= Fares Bayoush =

Syrian Air Force colonel

- فارس البيوش
- Born: 1970 (age 55–56); Kafr Nabl, Idlib Governorate, Syria
- Military career
- Allegiance: Ba'athist Syria (1990–2011) (Syrian opposition) Free Syrian Army (2012–17)
- Branch: Syrian Arab Air Force (1990–2011); Northern Division (2015–17); 5th Corps (2014); Free Idlib Army (2016–17)
- Service years: 1990–2011
- Rank: Lieutenant colonel
- Units: 24th Air Brigade (1992–2011); Knights of Justice Brigade (2012–17)
- Commands: 5th Corps chief of staff (2014)
- Conflicts: Syrian Civil War: Deir ez-Zor clashes (2011–14) (POW); Idlib Governorate clashes (June 2012–April 2013); Battle of Maarat al-Numan (2012) (WIA); 2013 Hama offensive; Battle of Murak; 2014 Hama offensive; Northwestern Syria offensive (April–June 2015); Northwestern Syria offensive (October–November 2015); 2015 Hama offensive; Syrian protests (2016)

Fares Bayoush (Arabic: فارس البيوش, born 1970) is a former lieutenant colonel in the Syrian Arab Air Force who defected to the Free Syrian Army in 2012.

== Military activities in the Syrian Air Force ==
In 1990, Fares Bayoush joined a Syrian Air Force technical institute and graduated as a lieutenant colonel in 1992. From there he became an aircraft engineer and an officer of the Syrian Air Force's 24th Brigade. He was stationed in the Deir ez-Zor Airport.

== Syrian Civil War ==
On 1 April 2011, during the civil uprising phase of the Syrian Civil War, Fares Bayoush went from Deir ez-Zor and traveled to the town of Kafr Nabl in the Idlib Governorate. He returned to Deir ez-Zor and contacted other officers to organize a mutiny in the Deir ez-Zor Airbase. They were arrested by the Air Force Intelligence Directorate and transferred to the Mezzeh Military Airport under detainment.

Fares Bayoush and two other military officers were released in June 2012. The next month, they announced their defection from the Syrian Armed Forces and joined the Free Syrian Army. They then headed back to Deir ez-Zor to join the rebels there, where heavy clashes between the government and the rebels occurred.

He returned to the Idlib Governorate and joined the Knights of Justice Brigade. The group took part in the battles in the province, including the Battle of Maarrat al-Nu'man where Bayoush was wounded in action.

In December 2013, Fares Bayoush and Lt. Col. Ahmad al-Saud of the 13th Division were captured by the Islamic State of Iraq and the Levant. The two were released after pressure by other rebel groups, including the Idlib Military Council.

Later in 2014, the group received BGM-71 TOW anti-tank missiles from the United States. The Knights of Justice Brigade and other FSA groups in Idlib cooperated with al-Qaeda's al-Nusra Front. In September 2014, Fares Bayoush condemned the American-led intervention in Syria against the ISIL and the al-Nusra Front. In an interview in 2015, Bayoush stated that "We have to work with Nusra Front and other groups to fight the regime and Daesh". In late 2015, the Knights of Justice Brigade and other FSA groups such as the Mountain Hawks Brigade, both supported by the US, were targeted with Russian airstrikes during the Russian military intervention in Syria.

=== Political activities and resignation ===
Fares Bayoush was one of the Syrian opposition delegates during the Astana peace talks which began on 23 January 2017.

On 31 January 2017, Lt. Col. Fares Bayoush resigned from his positions in the Northern Division and the Free Idlib Army, citing foreign fighters and jihadist flags in Idlib.

On 10 April 2022, Bayoush, speaking from Turkey, called Russian Army General Aleksandr Dvornikov, who commanded the Russian military intervention in Syria and was appointed commander of the 2022 Russian invasion of Ukraine, a war criminal. Bayoush said Dvornikov utilized scorched earth policy in Syria and expected him to do the same in Ukraine.

== See also ==
- Hassan Hamada
- List of Syrian defectors
