= Battle of Maarat al-Numan =

Battle of Maarat al-Numan may refer to:

- Siege of Ma'arra, during the First Crusade
- Battle of Maarat al-Numan (2012), during the Syrian civil war
- Battle of Maarat al-Numan (2016), during the Syrian civil war
