= 5th Corps (Syrian rebel group) =

- Arabic: فيلق الخامس
- Logo of the 5th Corps
- Leaders: Lt. Col. Fares Bayoush; Lt. Col. Ahmad al-Saud
- Dates active: 7 September 2014 – November 2014 (defunct)
- Headquarters: Maarrat al-Nu'man and Kafr Nabl
- Active regions: Northwestern Syria: Idlib Governorate; Aleppo Governorate; Hama Governorate
- Ideology: Syrian nationalism
- Size: Few thousand
- Part of: (Syrian opposition) Free Syrian Army; Syrian Revolutionary Command Council
- Wars: the Syrian civil war

The 5th Corps (Arabic: فيلق الخامس) was an alliance of five Syrian rebel groups that was formed during the Syrian Civil War in September 2014. All five units were affiliated with the Free Syrian Army and the Supreme Military Council, used the Syrian independence flag as their symbol, and received BGM-71 TOW anti-tank missiles from the US-backed Friends of Syria Group through the Military Operations Center in Reyhanlı, Turkey, near the Syrian border.

== Composition and leadership ==
- 13th Division
- Knights of Justice Brigade
- Hawks of Mount Zawiya Brigade
- 101st Infantry Division
- 1st Brigade

The 5th Corps was headed by Lieutenant Colonel Fares Bayoush, who was also the leader of the Knights of Justice Brigade.

== Activities ==
Despite being supported by the US, the 5th Corps condemned the American-led intervention in Syria against ISIL and the al-Nusra Front.

The group held that the Syrian Interim Government was responsible for the accidental injection of atracurium besilate into 75 children during a measles vaccination campaign in the countryside of Maarat al-Nu'man on 16 September 2014, killing 15 of them, all between 6 and 18 months old.

== Aftermath ==
On 20 November 2014, the groups that constituted the 5th Corps, with the exception of the Mountain Hawks Brigade and the 101st Infantry Division, joined a new, more Islamist-oriented, rebel alliance called the "Gathering of Rebels in Southern Idlib" based in Maarat al-Nu'man, rendering the 5th Corps defunct.

== See also ==
- Free Idlib Army
- List of armed groups in the Syrian Civil War
