= 2014 Hama offensive =

Military operation launched by rebels in the Syrian Civil War

- Part of the Syrian Civil War
- Map of the course of the offensive.
Date	26 July – 19 September 2014 (1 month, 3 weeks and 3 days)
Location	Hama Governorate, Syria
Result	Syrian Army victory: Rebels initially capture Khitab and its military base, Halfaya and up to 15 villages; Rebels expel government troops from southwestern Mork; Rebel attack on Mhardeh repelled; The Army recaptures Khitab and its military base, Halfaya and all other territory previously lost, in addition to eight other villages

Belligerents
Al-Nusra Front; Ajnad al-Sham; Muhajirin wa-Ansar Alliance; Syrian Revolutionary Command Council; Free Syrian Army; Islamic Front	(Syria) Syrian Arab Republic; Iran

Commanders and leaders
Ahmed al-Sharaa (Nusra leader); Abou Hammam as-Suri (Nusra general military commander); Abdullah al-Muhsini (senior Nusra commander); Yusef al-Hassan	Col. Suhayl al-Hasan (overall commander); Abu Fahd (WIA) (NDF commander of Mhardeh)

Units involved
Free Syrian Army; Jabhat Thuwar Saraqib; Al Majed Brigade; Al Fatehin Brigade; Muhajirin wa-Ansar Alliance; Jund al-Aqsa; Omar Brigade	Syrian Armed Forces; Syrian Army; Brigade 66; Spec Ops "Tigers" unit; National Defense Force; Local NDF militia; Islamic Revolutionary Guard Corps

Strength
1,500 militants	Unknown

Casualties and losses
150+ militants killed (Al-Nusra Front only; government claim)	Unknown

The 2014 Hama offensive, codenamed Ghazwat Badr al-Sham al-Kubra, was a military operation launched by Syrian rebels during the Syrian Civil War in the northern parts of Hama Governorate, in an attempt to reach the Hama Military Airport and the provincial capital of the province. It was also launched in an attempt to cut the supply line to Aleppo, especially after the rebels seized the village of Rahjan.

Although the offensive was initially met with success, the Army quickly launched a counter-offensive on 26 August, resulting in the recapture of all territory lost to the rebels since 26 July and the takeover of new territory previously held by the rebels.

== Rebel offensive ==
On 26 July, the rebels in Hama province captured the town of Khitab, Rahbeh village, Khitab arms depots and army base. The next day, clashes continued between pro-government forces and rebels in the western sides of Qamhana town and in the villages of al-Sher and al-Majdal in the western countryside of Hama near Maharda. On 28 July, rebels killed six soldiers and captured the "Btesh" checkpoint in Tarabih, located nine kilometers north of Hama military airport. During their advance, the rebels began striking the airport with Grad missiles. Meanwhile, new Army reinforcements arrived in the area. As the rebels advanced, they were able to cut off the road linking Hama city to a string of government-controlled Christian and Alawite villages in the west of the province.

On 29 July, government forces recaptured Salba and Tall Mallah on the Hama–Suqaylabiyah road.

On 9 August, a pro-government source claimed that the Army thwarted a rebel attack on a garrison in Mhardeh. On 13 August, according to the pro-opposition SOHR, rebels recaptured the southwestern part of the town of Mork, while the Army began retreating to the outskirts of the town. However, fighting continued in the town the next day.

At the same time, rebels captured the Tall al-Sheyha and the village of Arzeh, killing at least 12 soldiers, and placing themselves within 3–4 km of Hama Military Airport. According to the SOHR, the rebels lost six fighters that day. They lost another five fighters (including a battalion commander) the next day. On 16 August, rebels captured the al-Madajin checkpoint, while they were forced to retreat from al-Shayha village and Tall al-Sheyha due to heavy bombardments on the region. The rebels managed to recapture the hill later that day, destroying a tank in the progress. All five crew members were reportedly killed.

On 18 August, a Syrian fighter jet was shot down by rebels near the Hama airport. The pilot was reportedly killed in the act. Rebels tried to enter the village of Qbayyat during the night, resulting in heavy clashes with pro-government fighters and soldiers.

== Army counter-attack ==
The next day, Syrian forces regained control over the village of Um Hurayzah in the eastern countryside of Hama, while they also managed to advance towards Arze village. Seven rebels were killed during the day. On 20 August, the Army made new gains near the city of Halfaya, while two rebel commanders were killed during the day.

== Rebels capture Halfaya ==
On 22 August, a rebel brigade commander was killed near the village of al-Shiha, while the Al-Nusra Front sent reinforcements (consisting of two convoys) from Aleppo to the south of Halfaya city. The next day, new reinforcements from Al-Nusra Front arrived near Mhardeh city and in the Halfaya area in preparations for the start of the battle for Mhardeh.

On 23 August, a rebel attack on the Mhardeh power station was repelled. The next day, rebel forces, primarily composed of Al-Nusra fighters, captured the city of Halfaya. On 25 August, government troops recaptured the "Btesh" checkpoint but had to abandon it once again due to heavy rebel shelling.

== New Army counter-attack ==
At this point, no less than 1,500 fighters from the Al-Nusra Front grouped in Halfaya and around Mhardeh, with the assault force personally led by the group's leader Abu Mohammad al-Jawlani. According to a source within Nusra, the Free Syrian Army rejected the idea of storming the Christian majority city of Mhardeh and hence the large number of reinforcements brought from Aleppo. Before the assault, al-Jawlani gave a speech to his fighters to boost morale. At the same time, military special forces reinforcements, known as the "Tiger Forces", arrived from Aleppo province, along with their commander, Col. Soheil Al-Hassan.

On 26 August, the rebel attack on Mhardeh was launched and fighting raged for the numerous checkpoints defending the city. The same day, Army units captured rebel positions near the village of Shar'aya, as well as the village itself.

On 27 August, rebels captured a number of soldiers near Arzeh, while fighting in the village itself was renewed later in the day.

On 28 August, the Army captured Tall al-Sheyha hill and advanced in Bateesh, Arzeh and Khitab. The rebels used the hill to bombard the airport in previous days. Later in the day, the "Btesh" checkpoint was once again reported to be government-held but coming under rebel fire. By this point, the rebel attack on Mhardeh was seen as to have failed following the military counterattack during which government troops recaptured checkpoints along the road leading to Halfaya.

Two days later, the pro-government Al-Masdar News site reported the NDF forces, supported by the reinforcements, repelled a rebel infiltration attempt near the Mhardeh power plant.

On 7 September, the Army recaptured Arzeh, while 17 rebels (including a commander) were killed in fighting along the frontline. Al-Masdar News also claimed the Army recaptured Deir Hamra, near the airport. The next day, rebels captured the Seher Hill checkpoint, while Army units advanced in the Sen Seher - Zor al Qse’eyyi area and the village of Zor Bel Hsein.

On 9 September, the Army recaptured Khitab, Zor Bel Hsein, Zor al Masaleq, Zor al Jdid and Kherbet al Hjame, and the Rahbat Khitab military base, while according to Al-Masdar News, Army and NDF units also seized the villages of Al-Samama and Qamaha and two neighborhoods in Halfaya. An al-Nusra Front commander was killed near Halfaya during the day's fighting. With government troops regaining control of these villages and the rebels pushed back, Hama military airport was no longer threatened.

The next day, Syrian and Iranian forces recaptured the southern part of Halfaya city, the "Btesh" checkpoint and the farmlands of Btesh. On 11 September, the military made further advances in Halfaya leaving a large part of the area under government control. In the evening, the Army secured Halfaya.

On 13 September, government troops captured a further three towns in Hama province, including Taibet al-Imam, Lweibdah and Zour Abo Zaid, and inflicted "gross losses" among opposition fighters, just two days after they fully recaptured Halfaya. In addition, on 15 September, the Army seized captured Zalaqiyat, and the next day, seized Jadidah, Jalma, Tall Melh, Kafr Hawad and Tremseh. Thus, government forces reached the outskirts of the rebel stronghold of Al-Lataminah.

On 17 September, the rebels recaptured Tall Melh, Zalaqiyat Tremseh and Jalma after they infiltrated the villages. During the fighting, 28 soldiers were killed. The military also reportedly managed to seize the southwest entrance of Al-Lataminah. Over the next two days, government troops regained control of Tall Melh, Tremseh and Jalma after killing at least 29 rebel fighters. They then proceeded to fortify Tall Melh, Jadidah and Abu Zaher against any further infiltration.

On 19 September, the Army also captured the villages of Abu Redeh and Hasraya. The day before, a rebel media activist declared the rebel offensive that started in late July to be over.

== Aftermath – Army capture of Mork ==
On 30 September, the Army captured the villages of al-Buwaydah and al-Masasnah. According to a military source, over 25 Al-Nusra militants were killed in the fighting, including an aide of Abu Mohammad Al-Jolani.

On 6 October, the Army captured Al-Jabin, as well as two other towns.

On 23 October, government forces took back total control of the strategically important city Mork, nine months after it was seized by rebels and their al-Qaeda allies. The same day, the Syrian army captured Tal Itmeen after clashes with rebels who were retreating from Mork. One week later, the SAA also captured Tall Sayid, northeast of Kafr Zita.

On 4 November, SAA took control of Qabr Farat and Al-Kareem near the border of Idlib.

== Strategic analysis ==
The rebel offensive forced government forces to step up their troop presence in the area, which would limit the Army's capabilities in other areas, such as Aleppo, according to a rebel commander. The aim of the rebel offensive was to capture the military airport and stop the Air force from manufacturing barrel bombs, which were being manufactured at the base and used for many months to strike opposition-controlled areas across Syria.

== See also ==
- Battle of Mork
