= Syrian protests (2016) =

Protests against the Syrian government

- Part of the Syrian Civil War
- Date: 4 March 2016 – late April 2016
- Location: Aleppo Governorate, Idlib Governorate, Homs Governorate, Damascus Governorate, Daraa Governorate, and al-Hasakah Governorate, Syria
- Caused by: 5th anniversary of the Syrian Civil War
- Goals: Resignation of Bashar al-Assad; Democracy
- Methods: Protests; Demonstrations; Riots; Arson; Internet activism

Parties
Pro-Syrian opposition protesters	Al-Nusra Front Jund al-Aqsa

Lead figures
(Syrian opposition) Mulham Sameer protest co-coordinator in Maarat al-Nu'man	

Casualties and losses
1 protester killed, 50 arrested (most released later)	

The Syrian protests (2016) were a series of large-scale protests against the Syrian government and in support of the Syrian opposition taking place throughout opposition-controlled territory in Syria. The protests spread throughout the country due to the implementation of a partial ceasefire taking place after 27 February 2016. The goal of the protests in 2016 was the resignation of president Bashar al-Assad. In addition, the activists demanded the withdrawal of Russian forces from Syria, displaced people to be returned to their homes and adequate humanitarian aid.

== UN resolution ceasefire ==
Over the course of the Syrian civil war there have been multiple ceasefires during the conflict. These are part of the ongoing Syrian peace process. The first ceasefire took place on 27th of february 2016, after United Nations Security Council unanimous adopted Resolution 2268 on february 26, 2016. This resolution, among other things, called for a ceasefire, and access for humanitarian aid into Syria. It also presses for a Syrian owned political transition, in which the ''Syrian people will decide the future of Syria''. The cease fire was mainly initiated by the United States and Russia, both countries backing opposite sides of the conflict.

The Syrian opposition called for the demonstrations a week after the ceasefire under the slogan ''The Revolution Continues''. Referring to the 2011 protests that took place before the outbreak of the civil war. The protesters took advantage of the diminishing airstrikes due to the ceasefire, and took to the street demanding political change.

== Protests ==
=== 4 March 2016 ===
Due to the partial ceasefire, on 4 March 2016 there were anti-government protests in more than 104 locations throughout Syria, particularly in rebel-held territories in Azaz, Aleppo, Idlib, Ghouta, and Daraa. The protesters waved Syrian independence flags and banners showing pro-revolutionary slogans such as "The revolution continues". The protests at the town of Maarrat al-Nu'man in Idlib Governorate were joined by several Free Syrian Army commanders, including Ahmad al-Saud of the 13th Division based in the town.

=== Idlib ===
On 7 March, anti-government protesters marched in the city of Idlib waving both the Syrian independence and white Shahada flags. Due to the presence of the independence flags, armed men from the Army of Conquest, which control the city, consisting of al-Nusra Front and Jund al-Aqsa dispersed the protests and threatened to open fire on the protesters.

The gunmen smashed cameras, confiscated flags, and arrested 10 of the protesters. Ahrar ash-Sham, another group in the Army, denounced the crackdown and stated that the masked men were not acting on behalf of the JaF.

=== Maarrat al-Nu'man ===
On 11 March 2016 around 200 protesters in Maarrat al-Nu'man in Idlib Governorate waved revolutionary flags and shouted slogans against Bashar al-Assad and the Syrian government. Members of the al-Nusra Front then arrived on motorcycles and waved the Black Standard, shouting the takbir on the speakers, dispersing the protesters.

On 12 March the 13th Division reportedly raided the al-Nusra headquarter in Maarrat al-Nu'man, and in response Nusra attacked the division's headquarters and its weapons depots, capturing small arms, ammunition, and, reportedly, BGM-71 TOW missiles, though the FSA denied it

Since then, hundreds of protesters rallied against al-Qaeda in the town for more than three consecutive days. Some of the protesters torched Nusra buildings, while another group stormed into a Nusra-held building and freed some prisoners.

By late June 2016, the protests against the al-Nusra Front in Maarat al-Nu'man have surpassed 100 days. As a result, al-Nusra released most of the arrested protesters and withdrew from the town center, remaining in 2 checkpoints in the outskirts. Al-Nusra continued to operate in the town through proxies in the Army of Conquest, and protests continued.

=== Qamishli ===
On 12 March Syrian Kurds commemorated the 12th anniversary of the 2004 Qamishli riots in Qamishli, al-Hasakah. Protesters supporting the Kurdish National Council marched on the streets waving the flag of Kurdistan and the flag of the KDP, while PYD supporters waved the flag of Rojava, the PYD, and the YPG. The Kurds also held a football match in the city.

=== As-Suwayda ===
In the city of as-Suwayda on 17 April, the 70th anniversary of the end of the French Mandate for Syria and the Lebanon, mainly Druze protesters gathered in the streets and protested against the Syrian government, Iran, Russia, and the Islamic State of Iraq and the Levant. The protesters raised photos of Sultan al-Atrash and other historical figures and spray-painted over Ba'athist symbols.

Protests in the city continued on 21 April, when protesters continued the "You Broke Us" campaign and shouted slogans against the Syrian government. Hundreds of government supporters then organized a counter-protest and the Shabiha attempted to break up the pro-opposition protests.

== Reactions ==
=== Syrian government ===
UN resolution 2268 was to be strictly implemented. However, the ceasefire would not apply to terrorist organisations, and US and Russian troops would work together to target these. The fight against organizations like ISIS and Jabat al-Nusura would continue. In reaction to the protests, the Assad regime would target specific towns and areas with airstrikes where political activism was organised. Justifying this by claiming that it was targeting terrorist groups, which were also present in civilian areas. Hospital personnel, children and rescue workers were among these civilian casualties.

=== Abroad ===
On 19 April, a group of Syrian activists called for a worldwide protest against the Assad regime and the Russian army targeting civilians. The protest was organized through Facebook and Twitter. The demonstrations took place in cities including Paris, New York, and Brussels.
