= 21st Combined Force (Syrian rebel group) =

- تجمع القوة 21
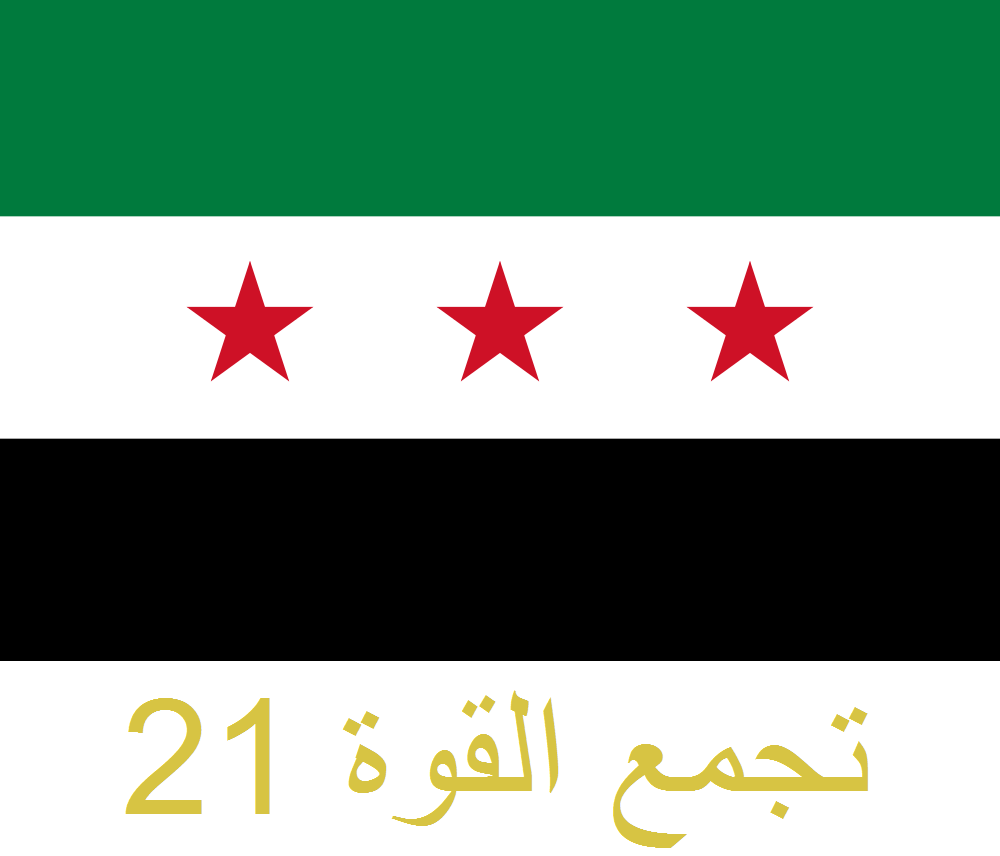
- Official logo of the 21st Combined Force Former 101st Infantry Division Flag
- Leaders: Col. Hassan Hamada; Col. Youssef Hammoud; Cmdr. Mamoun al-Omar; Lt. Col. Ammar Dayoub (executed); Osama al-Khader (executed)
- Dates active: June 2013 – present: June 2013 – March 2014 (as the 33rd Infantry Division); March 2014 – October 2016 (as the 101st Infantry Division); October 2016 – ?(as the 21st Combined Force)
- Groups: 1st Tank Brigade; 3rd Tank Brigade; 7th Special Forces Brigade; 9th Infantry Brigade; Special Missions Battalion; Resolute Storm Brigade
- Active regions: Idlib Governorate; Aleppo Governorate; Hama Governorate; Latakia Governorate
- Ideology: Syrian nationalism
- Size: 1,700 (2013); 2,000 (2015)
- Part of: (Syrian opposition) Free Syrian Army; Syrian Revolutionary Command Council (2014–2015); Fatah Halab (2015–2016); 5th Corps (2014)
- Wars: The Syrian civil war

The 21st Combined Force (Arabic: تجمع القوة 21), formerly called the 101st Infantry Division (Arabic: الفرقة 101 مشاة) and the 33rd Infantry Division (Arabic: الفرقة 33 مشاة), was a Syrian rebel group affiliated with the Free Syrian Army, sanctioned by the Syrian National Council, and part of the Syrian Revolutionary Command Council. The group was led by Colonel Hassan Hamada. It received U.S.-made BGM-71 TOW anti-tank missiles, and was funded by the Supreme Military Council.

== History ==
The background of the 101st Infantry Division lay within the Guardians of the Revolution group, a non-sectarian FSA group based in the Idlib Governorate that notably included religious minorities in its leadership positions. In June 2013, the Guardians of the Revolution merged with several other FSA groups under the authority of the Supreme Military Council to form the 33rd Infantry Division, led by Lieutenant Colonel Ammar Dayoub. The division claimed to have 1,700 fighters and its spokesman was Lieutenant Muhanad al-Ayssama, a Druze from Suwayda.

Soon after its formation, Ahrar al-Sham expelled the 33rd Infantry Division from the frontlines with the Syrian Army along the Aleppo-Latakia highway in Idlib, declaring its refusal to fight alongside more secular FSA groups. After pressure on Ahrar al-Sham from other FSA groups, it permitted the 33rd Division to return to the front.

On 5 July 2013, units of the 33rd Infantry Division were deployed to the town of al-Dana after fighters of the Islamic State of Iraq and the Levant reportedly opened fire on anti-ISIL protesters. Clashes broke out between the two groups, and resulted ISIL beheading a commander of the 33rd Division, and taking full control of the town.

On 21 July 2014, the 101st Infantry Division suspended its cooperation with al-Qaeda's al-Nusra Front. On 7 September 2014, 101st Division allied with four other rebel groups, including the Knights of Justice Brigade, into a new formation called the 5th Corps.

On 6 May 2015, along with 13 other Aleppo-based groups, it joined the Fatah Halab joint operations room.

In December 2015 it merged with the Knights of Justice Brigade to form the Northern Division, but the 101st Division left the group in June 2016.

On 14 October 2016, the 101st Infantry Division absorbed several smaller rebel groups and changed its name to the 21st Combined Force.

In late 2016, Lt. Col. Ammar Dayoub joined the Free Idlib Army. In December 2016, he was kidnapped in the southern Idlib countryside. On 2 March 2017, his body was found in a mass grave of more than 150 rebels executed by Jund al-Aqsa. The 21st Combined Force appeared to be largely inactive, and its last statement was in January 2017.

On 30 June 2017, military commanders of the 21st Combined Force, the 23rd Division, the Central Division, and the 1st Coastal Division signed the Geneva Call's "Deed of Agreement" pledging to protect children in the war, prohibit sexual violence, and prevent sexism.

On 17 August 2017, Tahrir al-Sham executed Osama al-Khader, commander of the 21st Combined Force's Resolute Storm Brigade, after they accused him of communicating with Euphrates Shield groups, the Army of Revolutionaries, the Northern Democratic Brigade, and blasphemy.

== Stance on Israel ==
The group's leadership stance on Israel can be described as hostile.

== See also ==
- List of armed groups in the Syrian Civil War
