= Battle of Maarat al-Numan (2016) =

Military operation

- Part of the Syrian Civil War and Inter-rebel conflict during the Syrian Civil War
Date	13 March 2016
Location	Maarat al-Numaan and Khan Shaykhun, Idlib Governorate, Syria 35°38′N 36°40′E
Result	Decisive al-Nusra Front victory: Al-Nusra Front fully captures Maarat al-Nu'man and Khan Shaykhun; Majority of Division 13's leaders captured

Belligerents
Free Syrian Army	Al-Nusra Front; Jund al-Aqsa

Commanders and leaders
Lt. Col. Ahmed al-Saud (Division 13 chief commander); Maj. Musa al-Khalid (Division 13 commander); Zahir al-Ahmed (POW) (56th Infantry Brigade commander); Capt. Ali al-Salloum (POW) (Victory Brigade commander); Zakaria Quitaz (Division 13 media official)	Ahmed al-Sharaa (Jabhat al-Nusra Emir)

Units involved
13th Division (surrendered): Victory Brigade; 56th Infantry Brigade	Unknown

Strength
Entire division: around 1,000 fighters	Unknown

Casualties and losses
7 killed, 40+ captured	4 killed
- Location within Syria

On 13 March 2016, Al-Nusra Front and Jund al-Aqsa launched an overnight attack against the Free Syrian Army's 13th Division headquarters in the town of Ma'arrat al-Nu'man. According to social media activists in support of the Syrian opposition, Jabhat al-Nusra attacked Division 13 over local protesters and demonstrations.

== Division 13 capture ==
The Division headquarters located in Ma'arrat al-Nu'man was overrun in a nighttime attack by a joint Al-Nusra Front and Jund al-Asqa assault force. Two Division storage facilities that were allegedly filled with the U.S.-built anti-tank TOW missiles were surrendered to the attackers. This claim was denied by Division 13 leader Ahmad al-Sa'aoud, insisting Al-Nusra Front captured only 'light weapons and ammunition' and that all of the groups anti-tank missiles and mortars were secured. The Division 13's depots in Maarat al-Nu'maan and three nearby towns were overrun; Hesh, Khan Shaykhun and Tal Aas. An unspecified number of armored vehicles and a tank were reportedly captured. Al-Nusra fighters conducted door-to-door searches, ultimately detaining 40 Division fighters including several top leaders of the rebel group. By the end of the battle, Division 13 abandoned all its posts in Maarat al-Nu'man and the bulk of its leadership fled to Turkey. However, civilians opposed to the takeover took to the streets and stormed Nusra's HQ in the city, freeing some prisoners. A total of 11 combatants died during the clashes.

== Aftermath ==
Unrest and civilian resistance against Jabhat al-Nusra's rule continued for coming months. On 12 June 2016, a demonstration took place in Maarat al-Nu'man against al-Nusra's authoritarianism, with protestors calling Ahmed al-Sharaa an "Iranian nark".

From 6 to 8 June of the next year, clashes broke out between Tahrir al-Sham and Sham Legion in Maarrat al-Nu'man. The 13th Division and the Free Police joined the fighting on 8 June. By the evening of 8 June, HTS captured both the 13th Division and the Sham Legion's headquarters in Maarat al-Nu'man and killed Col. Tayser al-Samahi, the head of the Free Police in the town. On 9 June, a ceasefire agreement was signed between the Free Idlib Army and Tahrir al-Sham in the town and the latter ordered the 13th Division to be disbanded.
