= Al-Tanf offensive (2016) =

Rebel offensive of the Syrian Civil War

- Part of the Opposition–Islamic State conflict and the American-led intervention in the Syrian Civil War
Date	3 – 5 March 2016 (2 days)
Location	Al-Tanf, Homs Governorate, Syria
Result	FSA victory: Rebels capture the Al-Tanf border post and immediate surroundings

Belligerents
(Syrian opposition) Free Syrian Army; Supported by: CJTF–OIR: United States; CIA; Jordan	ISIL

Commanders and leaders
(Syrian opposition) Khazal al-Sarhan (New Syrian Army commander)	(Islamic State) Abu Bakr al-Baghdadi (Leader of ISIL)

Units involved
(Syrian opposition) Free Syrian Army; Authenticity and Development Front; Syrian Free Army; Southern Front	Military of ISIL

Strength
Unknown	Unknown

Casualties and losses
Unknown	Unknown

The Al-Tanf offensive was a two-day offensive launched by the Free Syrian Army backed by the U.S.-led Coalition against the Islamic State of Iraq and the Levant (ISIL), aiming to recapture al-Tanf, Syria. Al-Tanf had been captured by ISIL from the Syrian Government in May 2015 and had been used by ISIL to shift militants and resources across the border.

On 3 March 2016, Syrian rebels took the offensive to capture al-Tanf, and after several hours of fighting captured the border post.

ISIL counter-attacked several hours later, and recapturing the post. The fighting continued until the next day, in which the rebels repelled ISIL fighters and recaptured the post.
