= Battle of Maarat al-Numan (2012) =

Military operation

- Part of Idlib Governorate clashes (June 2012–April 2013) of the Syrian Civil War
- Maarrat al-Nu'man and the strategic M5 highway, the main Army supply route from Hama and Damascus to Aleppo
Date	8–13 October 2012 (5 days)
Location	Maarat al-Numan, Syria 35°38′N 36°40′E
Result	Rebel victory
Territorial changes	Rebel forces take control of Maarat al-Nu'man on 10 October; Rebel forces capture a 5-kilometer stretch of highway south of the city on 11 October

Belligerents
Free Syrian Army; Al-Nusra Front	(Syria) Syrian Armed Forces

Commanders and leaders
Col. Heitam Afasi; Lt. Col. Khaled Hmood Lt. Col. Fares Bayoush (WIA)	Unknown

Units involved
Free Syrian Army; Knights of Justice Brigade; Maarrat al-Nu'man Martyrs Brigade	5th Armoured Division: 17th Armoured Brigade

Casualties and losses
108 killed^{*}	190 killed, 19 captured (by 12 October); Two Su-22 jet shot down
- 60 civilians killed
- ^*Includes 50 defectors executed by the military.
- Location within Syria

The Battle of Maarat al-Numan (Arabic: معركة معرة النعمان) took place between the Syrian Army and the rebel Free Syrian Army for control of the strategically important town of Maarrat al-Numan in October 2012, during the Idlib Governorate clashes (June 2012–April 2013) of the Syrian Civil War.

== Battle ==
=== Rebel offensive ===
On 8 October, the rebels launched an offensive to capture the town of Maarrat al-Nu'man, which holds a strategic position next to the M5 Highway, a key route which government reinforcements from Damascus would need to use in order to enter the battle in Aleppo. The city had already been captured once before by the rebels, on 10 June, but was recaptured by the military in August. During the evening, the Air Force started conducting air-strikes against the town in an attempt to stop the rebel attack.

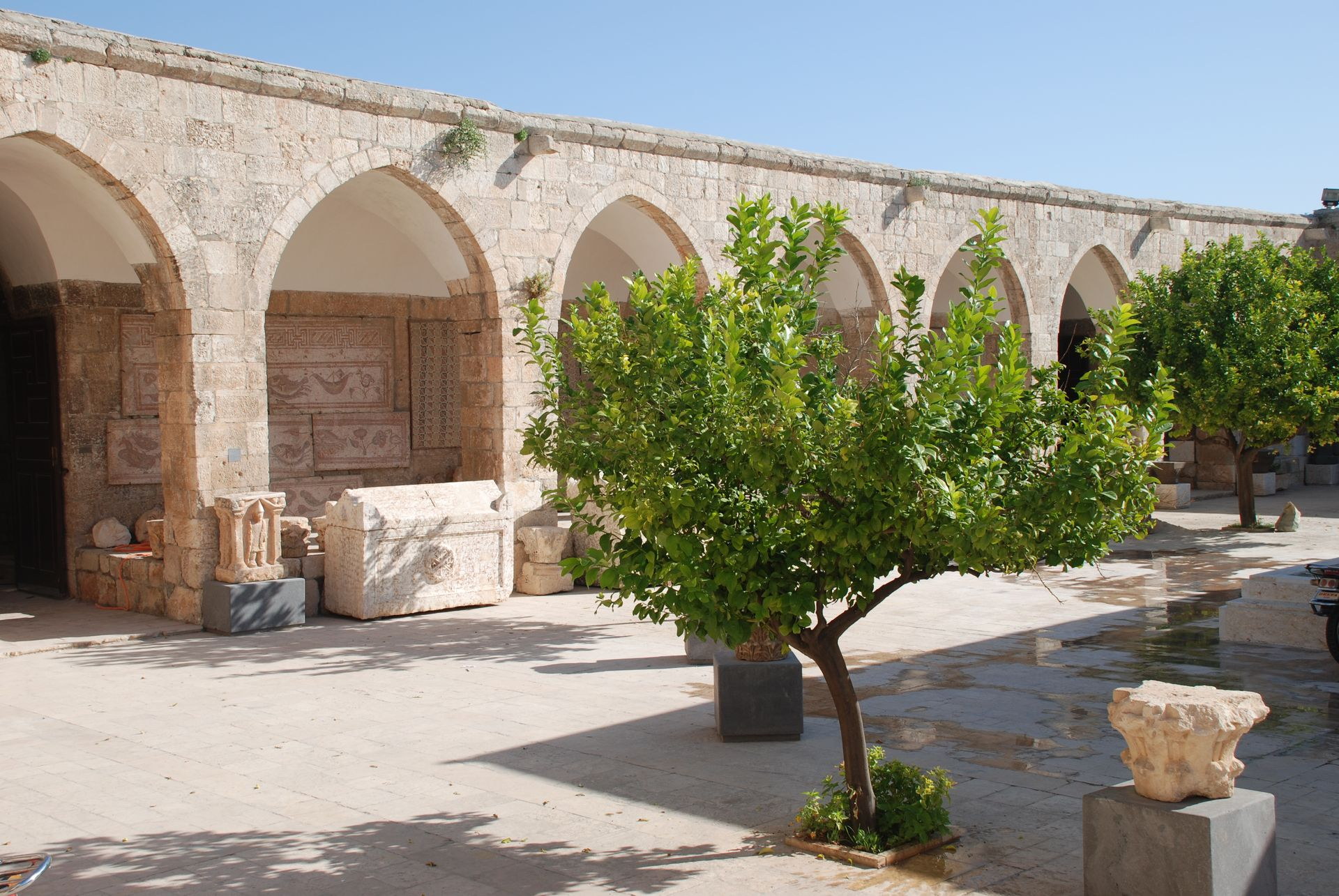
The mosaic museum before the war

By the next day, rebels seized eight of the military checkpoints around Maarrat al-Nu'man, leaving only one under government control at the entrance to the town. The rebels set up a headquarters in the town's mosaic museum, which was previously occupied by government troops. During the takeover, the rebels captured a government detention facility at the Arabic Cultural Center. As they entered the facility, a land mine explosion killed 16 rebel fighters. At the center, they reportedly found the corpses of 25 detainees, including 2 defecting soldiers, according to the opposition activist group SOHR. Later, a rebel media official said the number of executed people found was 65, with 50 of them being defecting soldiers according to an activist. Overall, not counting fatalities among government forces, more than 60 people were killed in the fighting for the town. At least 40 of the dead were civilians, while the rest were rebels.

=== Military counter-attack and Wadi Deif siege ===
On 10 October, rebels were in control of the western entrance to the city, while the military was in control of the eastern entrance, where government troops were reportedly massing for a counter-offensive. Tanks from Mastumah, south of Idlib city, were being sent to Maarrat al-Nu'man. Army forces were deployed along the highway to secure a corridor for the tanks. Rebels were making attempts to stop their advance and reportedly damaged three tanks. Rebel fighters also intercepted troops on the outskirts of Khan Sheikhun, south of Maarrat al-Nu'man, leading to clashes that left 14 rebels dead. Later that day, the military conducted a counter-attack in an attempt to recapture the town. The rebels managed to repel the attack, but suffered heavy casualties, with one report stating 30 opposition fighters were killed.

On 11 October, an AFP reporter said that the rebels were in control of five kilometers of highway running from the town. On the same day, the FSA launched an attack on an army base, which was being used to shell Maarat al-Nu'man, just east of the town near the highway. Rebels used at least one captured tank, RPGs and mortar bombs, as the town continued to be hit by airstrikes.

On 12 October, 12 rebels were killed in a series of air-strikes by the Syrian Air Force south of the town.

On 13 October, the rebels renewed their assault on the Wadi Deif military base, east of Maarrat al-Nu'man. Air force jets bombed the attacking rebels leaving 22 fighters wounded. The town was being heavily shelled and hit with air-strikes as the military made attempts to retake Maarrat al-Nu'man. One of the primary targets of the strikes was an underground emergency field hospital. Later during the day, the rebels managed to halt a 40-vehicle military column advancing on the town, which included 10 tanks. The vehicles were stopped 10 kilometers south of Maarrat al-Nu'man.

== Aftermath ==
The battle was seen as a strategic victory for rebel forces. The capture of the town cut one of the main land supply routes for government troops fighting in Aleppo. Although, rebel forces did not manage to capture the Wadi Deif military base on the city's outskirts and a siege which lasted for six months ended in mid-April 2013 when the Syrian Army broke the blockade and potentially reopened the supply route from the capital Damascus towards Aleppo.
