= Free Idlib Army =

Syrian rebel coalition

- جيش إدلب الحر
- Leaders: Top commanders, since July 2017: Col. Afif Suleiman (overall commander, since 2019); Lt. Col. Suhaib Leoush (overall commander, until 2019); Capt. Naji Mustafa (deputy commander); Capt. Dumar Qanatri (chief of staff); Other commanders: Lt. Col. Nasha'at Haj Ahmad (Mountain Hawks Brigade); Lt. Col. Ahmed al-Saud (13th Division); Former: Capt. Hassan Haj Ali (Mountain Hawks Brigade and overall commander, until July 2017); Col. Ali al-Samahi † (chief of staff, assassinated in April 2017); 1st Lt. Mohamed Khalid Bayoush (Northern Division and alternate deputy commander, until July 2017); Lt. Col. Fares Bayoush (former Northern Division and deputy commander, resigned in January 2017); Amin Haj Ali † (field commander, killed in March 2019)
- Dates active: 19 September 2016 – 29 January 2025
- Groups: Mountain Hawks Brigade; Northern Division; 13th Division (2016-2017); Saraqib Revolutionaries Front
- Active regions: Northwestern Syria: Idlib Governorate; Aleppo Governorate; Hama Governorate; Latakia Governorate
- Ideology: Syrian nationalism
- Size: 6,000 (2016); 6,500 (2017)
- Part of: (Syrian opposition) Free Syrian Army (Syrian opposition) Syrian National Army: National Front for Liberation; Fatah Halab (2016)
- Wars: the Syrian Civil War

The Free Idlib Army (Arabic: جيش إدلب الحر Jaysh ʾIdlib al-Ḥarr) was a Syrian rebel coalition consisting of 3 armed groups from northwestern Syria affiliated with the Free Syrian Army: the 13th Division, the Northern Division, and the Mountain Hawks Brigade

== History ==
Initial logo of the Free Idlib Army.

On 25 August 2016, the commander of the Northern Division, Lieutenant Colonel Fares Bayoush announced that talks are made in Idlib on the unification of the three FSA-affiliated rebel groups in northwestern Syria. He stated that eventually the merger will be complete and the three component groups will dissolve into the main faction.

At its establishment on 19 September 2016, the coalition aims to prioritise fighting the Syrian government and establish relations and coordinate with the Salafist factions of the Army of Conquest, including Ahrar al-Sham and Jabhat Fateh al-Sham, al-Qaeda's renamed al-Nusra Front. However an opposition source stated that the Free Idlib Army will not closely cooperate with Jabhat Fateh al-Sham. Just a day before, the Mountain Hawks Brigade withdrew from the front against ISIL near Jarabulus and Azaz in order to head to southern Aleppo and Idlib. The commander aims for an eventual full merger between the 3 groups after forming a new command structure.

On 23 September Russian warplanes bombed a cave in Taybat al-Imam, killing 22 fighters from the Free Idlib Army.

In early October a number of Mountain Hawks Brigade fighters defected to join Jabhat Fateh al-Sham due to several disagreements, mainly due to the established of the Free Idlib Army.

In November, the deputy commanding general of the Free Idlib Army, first lieutenant Mohammed Khaled Bayoush, came under fire from machine guns fired by unknown assailants while in his car near the town of Kafr Nabl. The commander escaped without injury.

On 25 December 2016, two FIA commanders were shot and killed in Maarat. Opposition activists accused Jund al-Aqsa of conducting the assassination. The next day, the al-Nusra Front raided houses throughout Idlib and captured 16 FIA fighters from the Mountain Hawks Brigade. The rebels were captured on charges of participating in the Turkish military intervention in Syria.

On 23 January 2017, the 13th Division of the FIA repelled an al-Nusra advance toward Maarat al-Nu'man.

On 25 January 2017, the groups of fighters which left the Mountain Hawks Brigade in September 2016 for Jabhat Fateh al-Sham, returned, along with their leader, Lt. Col. Nasha'at Haj Ahmad.

On 31 January 2017, Lt. Col. Fares Bayoush resigned from his positions in the Northern Division and the Free Idlib Army, citing "Black Standards" in Idlib.

On 5 April 2017, a vehicle carrying Lt. Col. Ahmed al-Saud of the 13th Division and Colonel Ali al-Samahi, chief of staff of the Free Idlib Army, came under fire from Hayat Tahrir al-Sham fighters at a checkpoint near Khan al-Subul, which was under complete control of HTS. Al-Samahi and another fighter was killed in the shootout while al-Saud was wounded and was transferred to Turkey for treatment.

As a result of internal disputes between the 13th Division and the other factions in the Free Idlib Army, some members of the former reportedly released a statement on 11 April which claimed that the 13th Division will no longer be part of the Free Idlib Army and it will instead join the "central operations room" led by Col. Fadlallah al-Haji of the Sham Legion. This was denied by Lt. Col. Ahmed al-Saud, the overall commander of the 13th Division, who called the statement a "false report". Al-Saud called on all the member groups of the FIA to integrate under one organization.

On 11 July 2017, the Free Idlib Army appointed new commanders: Lt. Col. Suhaib Leoush (overall commander, replaced Capt. Hassan Haj Ali), Capt. Naji Mustafa (deputy commander, replaced 1st Lt. Muhammad Bayoush), and Capt. Dumar Qanatri (chief of staff, replaced Col. Ali Samahi, who was killed in April).

In May 2018, along with 10 other rebel groups in northwestern Syria, the Free Idlib Army formed the National Front for Liberation, which was officially announced on 28 May. Lt. Col. Suhaib Leoush was appointed as the formation's deputy commander.

On 7 March 2019, Amin Haj Ali, a field commander of the free Idlib Army, was killed by an IED in southern Idlib.

The unit subsequently fought alongside other rebel factions against the government's northwestern Syria offensive from April 2019. On 31 July 2019, Col. Afif Suleiman, commander of the Free Idlib Army and member of the National Front for Liberation's command council, was arrested by Hayat Tahrir al-Sham's security force at a checkpoint near Darat Izza as he was driving from Afrin District to the northern Idlib Governorate. Suleiman was detained in HTS's Oqab Prison in Jabal Zawiya, and released two days later.

On 11 November 2023, the National Front for Liberation announced that the Free Idlib Army and 23rd Division were merged as 60th Infantry Division.

At the Syrian Revolution Victory Conference, which was held on 29 January 2025, most factions of the armed opposition, including the Syrian National Army and its components, announced their dissolution and were incorporated into the newly formed Ministry of Defense.

== Equipment ==
The Free Idlib Army is known for possessing several new BM-21 Grad multiple rocket launchers which they used to bombard Syrian Army positions in southern Aleppo during the 2016 Aleppo summer campaign. In September 2016, one of the group's commanders, Fares Bayoush, confirmed that the rocket systems were newly supplied from foreign sponsors, and would be used in battlefronts in Aleppo, Hama, and Latakia.

== See also ==
- 5th Corps (Syrian rebel group)
- 101st Infantry Division (Syrian rebel group)
- List of armed groups in the Syrian Civil War
