= Euphrates Jarabulus Battalions =

Union of Euphrates Jarabulus Battalions
- تجمع كتائب الفرات جرابلس; Tajamu Kata'ib Furat Jarabulus
- Euphrates Jarabulus Battalions insignia
- Leaders: Abdul Sattar al-Jader † (2012-16); Ahmed al-Jader
- Dates active: 2013—present
- Groups: Martyr Yusuf al-Jader Battalion; Euphrates Shield Battalion; Jarabulus Knights Battalion; Martyr Zaki Jader Brigade; Instructor Jader Brigade; Juma al-Jader Brigade; Gwadar Martyrs Brigade; Jarabulus Armoured Battalion
- Headquarters: Manbij, Aleppo Governorate
- Active regions: Aleppo Governorate
- Ideology: Democracy
- Part of: (Syrian opposition) Free Syrian Army; Euphrates Islamic Liberation Front (2014); Syrian Democratic Forces; Euphrates Volcano (2014-15); Jarabulus Military Council
- Wars: the Syrian Civil War

The Union of Euphrates Jarabulus Battalions (Arabic: تجمع كتائب الفرات جرابلس; Tajamu Kata'ib Furat Jarabulus) is a Syrian rebel group affiliated with the Free Syrian Army and later the Syrian Democratic Forces which operates in northern Syria. Formed in mid-2013, the group has been led by several members of the influential al-Jader family from the town of Jarabulus and the nearby town of Karkamış in Turkey.

== History ==
The al-Tawhid Brigade participated in the Battle of Aleppo in late 2012 which led to the capture of the Aleppo Infantry School and the field commander, Colonel Yusuf al-Jader (nom de guerre Abu Furat al-Jarabulusi), was killed in action during the battle in December 2012.

In early 2013, the Union of Battalions of Martyr Colonel Abu Furat was formed in Jarabulus. In June 2013, clashes erupted in the town between the group and the al-Nusra Front and the Islamic State of Iraq and the Levant, which resulted in ISIL taking full control of Jarabulus. After the capture of Jarabulus by ISIL, the Euphrates Jarabulus Battalions moved its headquarters to the town of Zur Maghar, which is controlled by the YPG. The group attempted to reenter Jarabulus with other FSA factions but they were repelled by ISIL which killed dozens of their fighters. It then formed an alliance with the YPG in the Kobane Canton. Some members regrouped into the Jarabulus Brigade, a small independent faction.

After a battle between al-Tawhid Brigade and ISIL in Jarabulus, 6 members of the Jader family, among dozens of dissenters, were beheaded by ISIL in January 2014. In February 2014, the Martyr Abu Furat Battalions as part of the Euphrates Islamic Liberation Front captured several villages near Manbij and Jarabulus from ISIL.

In late 2014, the Union of Euphrates Jarabulus Battalions joined Euphrates Volcano. The Jarabulus Brigade initially participated in the defence of the Siege of Kobane but later left the city. In November 2015, the group joined the Syrian Democratic Forces.

In late 2016, just after the Manbij offensive which captured the city of Manbij from ISIL and before the Operation Euphrates Shield, the commander of Furat Jarabulus and the newly-formed Jarabulus Military Council, Abdul Sattar al-Jader was assassinated by sniper fire from unknown assailants. Ahmed al-Jader replaced his post as commander amid heavy clashes between the JMC and rival Syrian rebels and the Turkish Armed Forces.
