= Northern Division (Syrian rebel group) =

Unit of the Free Syrian Army

- الفرقة الشمالية
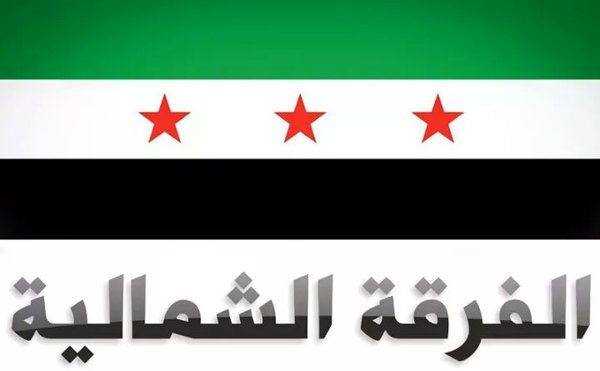
- Logo of the Northern Division Flag of the Knights of Justice Brigade
- Leaders: Lt. Col. Fares Bayoush (former, resigned in 2017); 1st Lt. Mohamed Khaled Bayoush
- Dates active: 25 February 2012—present (Knights of Justice Brigade); December 2015—present (Northern Division)
- Groups: Knights of Justice Brigade; 101st Infantry Division (December 2015—June 2016)
- Headquarters: Kafr Nabl
- Active regions: Hama Governorate; Idlib Governorate; Aleppo Governorate
- Size: 1,400 total, 300 active combatants (2013); 1,200 (2015)
- Part of: (Syrian opposition) Free Syrian Army; Free Idlib Army; 5th Corps (2014–2015); 13th Division (2013–2014); Syrian Revolutionary Command Council (2014–2015); Fatah Halab (2015–2016); Mare' Operations Room (2014–2016); Hawar Kilis Operations Room
- Wars: the Syrian Civil War

The Northern Division (Arabic: الفرقة الشمالية), formerly the Knights of Justice Brigade (Arabic: لواء فرسان الحق, Liwa Fursan al-Haqq), is a Free Syrian Army group sanctioned by the Syrian National Council and formerly part of the Syrian Revolutionary Command Council. The group received BGM-71 TOW anti-tank missiles from the United States and Saudi Arabia, and is also armed, trained, and funded by Qatar.

== History ==
The Knights of Justice Battalion was formed on 25 February 2012 by a defected Syrian Army first lieutenant Mohammed Khaled Bayoush in the town of Kafr Nabl in the Idlib Governorate. In September 2012 the group changed its name to the Knights of Justice Brigade after absorbing several smaller rebel groups. Former Syrian Air Force lieutenant colonel Fares Bayoush became its overall commander.

In June 2013, the group was one of the founding members of the 13th Division, but later left the group.

The group received funding, including salaries for its fighters, from the CIA, before being cut off in December 2014 following battlefield reversals at the hands of the al-Nusra Front.

The brigade joined a "quick response unit" of 600 fighters alongside other moderate and jihadist groups on 8 July 2014 to fight the Syrian Army and the Islamic State of Iraq and the Levant in Aleppo. It suspended its cooperation with al-Nusra Front on 21 July 2014. On 7 September 2014, the Knights of Justice Brigade announced that they were allying their forces with four other rebel groups, including the 101st Division and the 13th Division, into the 5th Corps.

In March 2015, the "Famous Brigade" which consisted of 170 fighters joined the Knights of Justice Brigade.

In mid-2015 the group renewed cooperation with the al-Nusra Front as part of the Army of Conquest during the northwestern Syria offensive (April–June 2015).

In September 2015 the 117 recruits from the group graduated after 3 months of training.

In December 2015 the Knights of Justice Brigade and the 101st Infantry Division formed the Northern Division. However, the 101st Division later left the group in June 2016, making the Knights of Justice Brigade the only component of the group.

In June 2016, Mohammed Khaled Bayoush survived an assassination attempt by car bomb near Kafr Nabl. He later became the deputy commander in the Free Idlib Army which the Northern Division is part of, and survived another assassination attempt near Kafr Nabl.

31 January 2017, Lt. Col. Fares Bayoush resigned from his positions in the Northern Division and the Free Idlib Army, citing "Black Standards" and the heavy presence of foreign jihadist fighters in Idlib. Bayoush claims that 12,000 rebel fighters have recently sought refuge in Turkey.
