= Jarabulus Company =

- سرايا جرابلس; Sarāyā Jarābulus
- Dates active: 2013 – 2014
- Active regions: Aleppo Governorate, Syria
- Part of: Euphrates Volcano; Free Syrian Army
- Wars: Syrian Civil War

The Jarabulus Company (Arabic: سرايا جرابلس, romanized: Sarāyā Jarābulus) was a Free Syrian Army-affiliated rebel group that was active during the Syrian Civil War.

The militia was a minor rebel group that fought the Islamic State of Iraq and the Levant during the Siege of Kobanî. The rebel group evolved from previous rebel groups in the town of Jarabulus, which became an ISIL stronghold in June 2013. An offensive by rebels to retake control of Jarabulus failed following a suicide bombing attack by the IS on 15 January 2014. According to a representative of the Northern Sun Battalion in Kobanî, Jarabulus Company initially operated in the city but has since lost their presence by late 2014.

== See also ==
- List of armed groups in the Syrian Civil War
