= Moussa al-Omar =

Syrian journalist and presenter (born 1981)

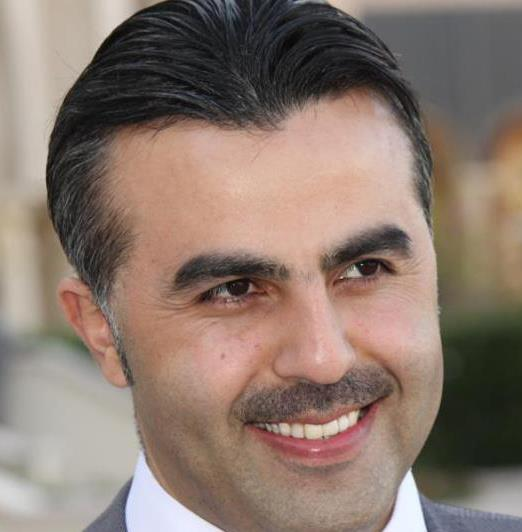
- Born: Moussa al-Omar; 7 May 1981 (age 44); Idlib, Syria
- Education: University of Damascus
- Occupations: Journalist; Presenter

Moussa al-Omar (Arabic: موسى العمر; born 7 May 1981) is a Syrian journalist and presenter.

== Biography ==
al-Omar was born in Idlib, Syria, to parents from Taftanaz, he was raised in Damascus. He studied high school in Damascus and graduated from University of Damascus in 2004.

== Career ==
He began his career as journalist and presenter for Sham TV, and he was one of the founders of the channel before it was closed down by Syrian authorities in 2006. He then moved to Dubai to work with International News. At the beginning of 2010, al-Omar moved to London, United Kingdom and started working with Al Hiwar Channel, where he served as a presenter on shows such as Event's highlights (Arabic: أضواء على الأحداث) and Great Arab Uprising (Arabic: الإنتفاضة العربية الكبرى). On 14 June 2012, Moussa announced on his page in Facebook and Twitter officially resigned from Alhiwar Channel.

== Personal life ==
al-Omar was a supporter of the Syrian uprising and covered many charities related to this issue. Moussa al-Omar currently resides in London.
