= 13th Division (Syrian rebel group) =

Syrian political opposition

- الفرقة 13
- Insignia of the 13th Division.
- Leaders: Lt. Col. Ahmad al-Saud; Col. Ali al-Samahi †; Zaher al-Ahmad (56th Infantry Brigade) (POW); Abdul Karim Alito †; Maj. Moussa al-Hamoud (Victory Brigade); Capt. Ali al-Salloum (POW) (Victory Brigade); Maj. Abu Qusay (Khan Shaykhun Shield Brigades); Maj. Mousa al-Khaled (Victory of Saladin Brigade); Abdul Salam Najjar (Mustafa Brigade) (former); Ahmad al-Ibrish (spokesperson); Zakaria Quitaz (media official)
- Dates active: June 2013 – 2017
- Groups: 56th Infantry Brigade; Maarat al-Nu'man Martyrs Brigade; Khan Shaykhun Shield Brigades; Slaves of Mercy Brigade; Victory Brigade; Northern Shield Brigade; Mustafa Brigade (former); Imam Bukhari Brigade; Victory of Saladin Brigade; Knights of Justice Brigade (former, 2013–14); Ansar al-Haq Brigade (former)
- Headquarters: Ma'arrat al-Numan
- Active regions: Idlib Governorate; Hama Governorate; Aleppo Governorate
- Ideology: Syrian nationalism
- Size: 1,800+ (own claim in 2014)
- Part of: (Syrian opposition) Free Syrian Army; Free Idlib Army; Hawar Kilis Operations Room; Fatah Halab (2015–2016); Mare' Operations Room (2014–2016); 5th Corps (2014–2015)

The 13th Division (Arabic: الفرقة 13) was a Syrian rebel group sanctioned by the Syrian National Council. It was among the first armed Syrian opposition groups to receive U.S.-made BGM-71 TOW anti-tank missiles. The group's leader lieutenant colonel Ahmad al-Sa'oud said during an interview that the missiles were provided by the Friends of Syria, which also (according to al-Sa'oud) provided training on how to use the advanced weaponry. According to a spokesperson for the FSA's Supreme Military Council, the 13th Division was funded by sources within Qatar and Saudi Arabia.

== History ==
The 13th Division originated in March 2012 under the name of the "Slaves of Mercy Brigade" and grew that year to 1,000 men according to its leader Lt. Col. Ahmad al-Saoud, who defected from the Syrian Army. In 2013 the group was incorporated into the Free Syrian Army as the 13th Division.

In December 2013, Islamic State of Iraq and the Levant (ISIL) overran a Division 13 base in Kafr Nabl, seizing ammunition and weaponry. This came after a history of clashes between the two groups. The following day, Lieutenant Colonel Ahmad al-Sa'oud was ambushed and captured in Taftanaz by ISIL while he was trying to negotiate for their return. He was released after two weeks. The group is currently fighting the Syrian government and ISIL.

The group fought in Khan al-Asal, the Rashideen neighbourhood, and the Research Sciences Centre in Aleppo. In Idlib and Hama Governorates, the 13th Division fought at Mork, Khan Shaykhun, Heish, Qumeis, Baboulin, Wadi Al-Deif military base and Al-Hamdiyyeh military base.

On 6 May 2015, along with 13 other Aleppo-based groups, joined the Fatah Halab joint operations room.

On 18 September 2016 one of the 13th Division commanders, Abdul Karim Alito, was killed in action during the 2016 al-Bab offensive.

On 19 September 2016, the 13th Division, along with the Mountain Hawks Brigade and the Northern Division, formed the Free Idlib Army.

As a result of internal disputes between the 13th Division and the other factions in the Free Idlib Army, some members of the former reportedly released a statement on 11 April 2017 which claimed that the 13th Division will no longer be part of the Free Idlib Army and it will instead join the "central operations room" led by Col. Fadlallah al-Haji of the Sham Legion. This was denied by Lt. Col. Ahmed al-Assad, the overall commander of the 13th Division, who called the statement a "false report". Al-Saud called on all the member groups of the FIA to integrate under one organization.

=== Clashes with al-Qaeda ===
In November 2014, the 13th Division and the al-Nusra Front clashed in Jabal Zawiya as part of the al-Nusra Front-SRF/Hazzm Movement conflict. Al-Nusra reportedly declared war on rebel factions receiving Western military support. However, fighting between the two groups soon ceased because the 13th Division "did not wanted to share the same fate as the Hazzm Movement", which was defeated and dissolved by al-Nusra.

On 13 March 2016, the al-Nusra Front and Jund al-Aqsa seized the headquarters of the 13th Division after an overnight battle for control of Maarrat al-Nu'man. Division 13 was involved in a truce with the Syrian army since February 27. Several fighters have deserted before the conflict with the Nusra began. Division 13 has confirmed that al-Nusra and Jund al-Aqsa captured all of their weapons. According to social media activists in support of the Syrian opposition, Jabhat al-Nusra attacked Division 13 after local demonstrations used the Syrian independence flag, rather than the black flag of jihad.

According to a report released by the Free Syrian Army, Jabhat al-Nusra and Jund al-Aqsa attacked their bases in Ma'arat al-Nu'man, killing 4 of their combatants and wounding as many as 20 others during a fierce battle between the groups. The Division 13 members stated that they could not hold their ground against al-Qaeda militants, so they surrendered two of their storage facilities that allegedly stored U.S. manufactured TOW anti-tank missiles as well as seizing armored vehicles, a tank, and other arms.

Experts have stated that ultimately, "There will be localized clashes, but not necessarily full-blown civil war. In Maarat al-Numan it's easier to take on Nusra as Division 13 is stronger and there isn't a Jaysh al-Fatah administration".

On 18 July 2016, the al-Nusra Front was accused of kidnapping Zaher al-Ahmad, the commander of the division's 56th Infantry Brigade en route from Maarat al-Numan to Aleppo.

On 30 September, Ahmad al-Sa'oud openly threatened al-Nusra on social media that the 13th Division has "no choice" but to "take revenge for the blood of its members", accusing people of "spreading lies and fabricating charges" against the 13th Division in order to ignite conflict.

On 5 April 2017, a vehicle carrying Lt. Col. Ahmad al-Saud and Colonel Ali al-Samahi, the chief of staff of the Free Idlib Army and formerly a commander in the 13th Division, came under fire from Tahrir al-Sham fighters at a checkpoint near Khan al-Subul, which was under complete control of Tahrir al-Sham. Al-Samahi and another fighter was killed in the shootout while al-Saud was wounded and was transferred to Turkey for treatment.

From 6 to 8 June, clashes broke out between Tahrir al-Sham and Sham Legion in Maarrat al-Nu'man. The 13th Division and the Free Police joined the fighting on 8 June. By the evening of 8 June, HTS captured both the 13th Division and the Sham Legion's headquarters in Maarat al-Nu'man and killed Col. Tayser al-Samahi, the brother of Col. Ali al-Samahi and the head of the Free Police in the town. On 9 June, Tahrir al-Sham announced the completion of their operations against the FSA and took full control of the town. Later that day, a ceasefire agreement was signed between the Free Idlib Army and Tahrir al-Sham in the town and the latter ordered the 13th Division to be disbanded.

== Strength, structure ==
In March 2014, the 13th Division counted 1,800 men according to its leader Ahmad al-Saoud, split into 10 companies, with another 200 in support roles.

== See also ==
- List of armed groups in the Syrian civil war
