= Jabhat Thuwar Saraqib =

Syrian rebel group

Jabhat Thuwar Saraqib Saraqib Revolutionaries Front
- جبهة ثوار سراقب
- Logo of Jabhat Thuwar Saraqib
- Leaders: Mohammed Abu Trad; Shaher al-Assouli
- Dates active: 2011-2025
- Headquarters: Saraqib, Idlib Governorate, Syria
- Part of: Free Syrian Army: Free Idlib Army
- Wars: Syrian Civil War

Jabhat Thuwar Saraqib (Arabic: جبهة ثوار سراقب) is an active armed Syrian Opposition group based in Saraqib in the Idlib Governorate in northwestern Syria and is part of the larger Free Idlib Army coalition and has ties to Ahrar al-Sham. The group was based in and had control of the city of Saraqib.

== History ==
In 2013, Jabhat Thuwar Saraqib was jointly in control of the city of Saraqib through a city council administered alongside Ahrar al-Sham and Jabhat al-Nusra.

On 8 July 2014, the group released a statement, stating the group's concern over a large rebel convoy abandoning front lines against the Syrian government, however Jabhat Thuwar Saraqib did not mention the rebel group by name but it was believed to be referencing Liwa Dawud, a group also from Saraqib which defected to the Islamic State of Iraq and the Levant after the group's 130 vehicle convoy switched directions from Aleppo to ISIL's capital in Raqqa to join it.

In August 2014, the group was involved in a joint campaign in northern Hama code named "Greater Badr al-Sham raid" alongside the al-Nusra Front and several other Free Syrian Army and opposition groups to drive Syrian government forces out of Mahardah, and clashed with the National Defence Forces based in a monastery in the town that had been shelled by the FSA.

In 2015, a member of the group fired his gun in the air after a football match after the team he was a fan of missed a goal and lost the game, however firearms were banned at the field in Idlib where the game was played.

In December 2016, Mohammed Abu Trad, one the group's commanders announced that the group would merge with any faction that he described as "loyal to God and homeland" after it was announced that several FSA groups and Ahrar al-Sham had formed a unified military council in Idlib.

In July 2017, Jabhat Thuwar Saraqib negotiated a cease-fire between Ahrar al-Sham and Hayat Tahrir al-Sham during fighting between the two in Saraqib. The group also released a statement saying that it would fight all hostile forces in Saraqib and that they wish for Saraqib to be excluded from the fighting between HTS and Ahrar al-Sham. Despite negotiating a cease-fire between Ahrar al-Sham and HTS, Hayat Tahrir al-Sham later stormed the headquarters of Jabhat Thuwar Saraqib and reportedly killed a media activist affiliated with the group during the raid.

On 16 January 2018, The group joined the Free Idlib Army coalition.

On 29 June 2019, Shaher al-Assouli a commander with Jabhat Thuwar Saraqib was targeted in an IED attack while meeting with members of Ahrar al-Sham who were visiting him, however several other individuals were killed and wounded in the attack including a National Front for Liberation commander and his son and five others.
