= Jund al-Aqsa =

Islamist militia in Syria

- جند الأقصى
- Flag of Jund al-Aqsa Emblem of Jund al-Aqsa
- Leaders: Abu Dhar al-Najdi al-Harethi; Abu Abdul Aziz al-Qatari † Abu Musab al-Ansari † Said Arif †; Abu Diab al-Sarmini (formerly)
- Dates active: January 2014 – 22 February 2017
- Group: Ansar ut-Turkistan (formerly)
- Headquarters: Sarmin, Idlib Governorate, Syria (2015–17); Khan Shaykhun, Idlib Governorate, Syria (Feb. 2017)
- Active regions: Hama Governorate, Syria; Idlib Governorate, Syria; Aleppo Governorate, Syria
- Ideology: Salafist jihadism
- Size: 1,000+ (2014); 600 (2015); 800 (before October 2016); 1,600 (late 2016); 1,000-2,000 (February 2017)
- Part of: Muhajirin wa-Ansar Alliance (2014–2015); Army of Conquest (2015–2017); al-Qaeda (2014–17); Al-Nusra Front (2014 & 2016–2017)
- Wars: the Syrian Civil War and Operation Inherent Resolve

Jund al-Aqsa (Arabic: جند الأقصى Jund al-‘Aqṣā, "Soldiers of al-Aqsa"), known as Liwa al-Aqsa after 7 February 2017, was a Salafist jihadist organization that was active during the Syrian Civil War. Formerly known as Sarayat al-Quds, the group was founded by Abu Abdul 'Aziz al-Qatari as a subunit within the al-Nusra Front. The group later became independent, because al-Nusra was growing too rapidly for its resources and had suffered from fighting the Islamic State. On 20 September 2016 the U.S. Department of State designated Jund al-Aqsa as a terrorist organization. The group rejoined al-Nusra Front, by then renamed Jabhat Fateh al-Sham (JFS), in October 2016. However, on 23 January 2017, JFS declared that Jund Al-Aqsa was no longer part of Jabhat Fateh Al-Sham. In early February 2017, some of Jund al-Aqsa's units joined the newly formed Tahrir al-Sham, while the others refused and formed a new splinter group called Liwa al-Aqsa, and captured many towns in northern Hama and southern Idlib from other rebel groups. Following these attacks, Tahrir al-Sham launched a military operation against Liwa al-Aqsa, accusing them of being an ISIL affiliate. Following intense clashes with Tahrir al-Sham, up to 2,100 Liwa al-Aqsa militants left Idlib Province to join ISIL in Raqqa Province, by 22 February 2017.

== History ==
The name of the group means "Soldiers of Aqsa," referring to Islam's third most important mosque in Jerusalem. They originally called themselves Sarayat al-Quds, which was a brigade operating under the al-Nusra Front, and drew inspiration from numerous Salafi-Jihadist scholars. Their goal was to eliminate the Assad regime and establish a state based on Sharia Islamic law. They did not see Syria as an independent state, rather as part of a larger caliphate, protecting a Sunni nation in Syria, Iraq, and Yemen. They differed from other militant groups, such as ISIL, in their methodology. They refused to accuse someone of apostasy (pronounced Takfeer in Arabic). Such accusations allow rebels to deprive one another of their life and property, in other words, looting and killing. Militarily, they try to attack only areas they can maintain. They also had a strong background in bomb making and mortars. They only opted to use suicide bombings as a last resort, and did not launch attacks against the West.

The group was clandestinely established in 2013 by Ahmed al-Sharaa as a front organization.

In early 2014, the group was reportedly composed of mostly non-Syrian Arab fighters. By the end of the year, it had reportedly become a Syrian-majority group, partly because of defections from other Syrian rebel groups. The group worked with local and foreign fighters made up of Salafi jihadists, Palestinian movements, Al Qaeda-aligned groups, and Free Syrian Army groups. Their military expertise was drawn largely from Iraqi, Afghani, and Bosnian Jihad veterans. The group preferred to recruit foreign fighters, as they have greater motivation, stronger connection to their ideology, and have fought in other militant groups prior. Their fighting was targeted in the Syrian North.

On 7 January 2014, it was confirmed that 34 foreign ISIL and Jund al-Aqsa fighters had been executed in the previous few days by rebels in the Jabal Zawiya area. ISIL retreated from Mayadin in Deir ez-Zor Governorate, without any fighting with rebel forces. East of Rastan, in Homs Governorate, ISIL attacked a rebel headquarters, killing 15 rebel fighters. During the day, it was revealed that during the previous evening, ISIL executed up to 50 prisoners in the Qadi al-Askar district of Aleppo. The dead included media activists, relief workers, and other civilians. According to the opposition SOHR, 42 people were executed, including, 21 rebel fighters and five media activists.

In February 2014, Jund al-Aqsa captured the town of Ma'an and massacred 21 Alawite civilians, two-thirds of them women and children. They launched another attack in March 2014, via suicide bombings that massacred another 20 civilians. They were also involved in an operation to seize a Hama military airport in July of the same year.

In March 2015, during the capture of Idlib city, Jund al-Aqsa aided its allies in the Jaish al-Fatah coalition by sending at least two suicide bombers of Kuwaiti and Saudi origins, which allowed the rebels to advance by capturing Qal’ah and Ayn Shib checkpoints. In July 2015, the group raided a Sharia court in Kafr Nabl alongside Jabhat al-Nusra. During the raid, al-Nusra and Jund al-Aqsa arrested several judges and seized documents from the court. The two groups also raided a police station in the town and closed several stores next to the court.

SOHR claimed that Jund al-Aqsa joined the 2016 Idlib Governorate clashes and established checkpoints in support of al-Nusra. According to the 13th Division's media wing, their position was overran and 4 of their fighters were killed.

In late August 2016, Jund al-Aqsa announced an offensive in northern Hama Governorate. During this offensive, it used a drone to drop two small bombs on government forces. These bombs were mostly ineffective, but accurate to within 4 meters.

In October 2016, clashes between Jund al-Aqsa and Ahrar al-Sham escalated throughout the Idlib Governorate, with both sides expelling each other from several towns and villages. During the clashes 800 other rebels reportedly defected to Jund al-Aqsa, increasing the group's strength up to 1,600 fighters.

On 25 December 2016, 2 Free Idlib Army commanders were shot and killed in Maarat. Opposition activists accused Jund al-Aqsa of conducting the assassination. The next day, the al-Nusra Front raided houses throughout Idlib and captured 16 FIA fighters from the Mountain Hawks Brigade. The rebels were captured on charges of participating in the Turkish military intervention in Syria.

As a result of the clashes, the group pledged allegiance to Jabhat Fatah al-Sham. This group was a rebranded version of al-Nusra Front, only changing their name in July 2016. The leaders of Jabhat Fateh al-Sham (JFS) and Jund al-Aqsa signed their names in a text agreement to pledge their allegiance. However, shortly after, an agreement between JFS and Ahrar al-Sham was posted on the Syrian opposition website, stating that Jund al Aqsa would be dissolved and completely incorporated with JFS, whereby preventing it from reconstructing independently under any other name or form.

The group has stated its continued loyalty to Ayman al Zawahiri for his eminence as the sheikh of the modern mujahedeen, according to them. Within the past three years, the group has assisted al-Qaeda in toppling the Syrian Revolutionaries Front and the Hazzm Movement, two key Western-backed rebel organizations in Syria, as well as weaken a third called Division 13.

Some sources believe that the original rift from al-Nusra Front was part of a Qatar-led effort to rebrand al-Nusra Front, and provide it with new support, a move that could increase external aid for the terrorist group. Another analysis of Jund al Aqsa's rift and reunification states that it's a reflection of al-Qaeda's strategy of downplaying its official ties to these groups, and a strategy of diversifying its investments, especially with regards to affiliations with Qatar and Kuwait and the lack of political will in their countries to combat terrorism and terror financing.

On 7 February 2017, Jund al-Aqsa attacked the headquarters of Jaysh al-Nasr near the town of Murak in northern Hama. Jund al-Aqsa captured more than 250 fighters from Jaysh al-Nasr. By 9 February, Jund al-Aqsa had captured 17 towns and villages from the Free Syrian Army and Tahrir al-Sham, in the northern Hama Province.

On 13 February 2017, clashes erupted between the Tahrir al-Sham and Liwa al-Aqsa (Jund al-Aqsa's new brand) in northern Hama and southern Idlib. It was rumored that Liwa al-Aqsa pledged allegiance to the Islamic State, sparking the clashes with Tahrir al-Sham, known as a staunch ISIL opponent.

On 14 February 2017, Jund al-Aqsa executed more than 170 prisoners of war, including both HTS fighters, FSA fighters, and civilians. Kafr Nuboudah and Kafr Zita villages were the origin of the Jaysh Nasr members whom Liwa al-Aqsa executed according to Moussa al-Omar. The casualties given for Jaysh Nasr were : fighters: fifty six, media reporters: three, and military chiefs : eleven, according to Moussa al-Omar. After Jund al-Aqsa committed the slaughter at Khan Shaykhun, only one person lived to tell the tale. On the next day, HTS captured the village of Heish from Jund al-Aqsa, and then besieged the retreating Jund al-Aqsa forces in Khan Shaykhun and Murak.

On 19 February 2017, a convoy of Jund al-Aqsa members and their relatives tried to cross from the Idlib Province into the Raqqa Governorate across a Syrian government supply route to Aleppo, stretching from Ithriyah to Salamiyah, in order to escape the rebel infighting in the restive Idlib Governorate. However, they were ambushed by the National Defence Forces, resulting in several deaths, with the rest of the militants surrendering themselves.

On 22 February 2017, the majority of Liwa al-Aqsa's remaining fighters left their final positions in Khan Shaykhun to join ISIL in the Ar-Raqqah Province after a negotiated withdrawal deal with Tahrir al-Sham and the Turkistan Islamic Party in Syria. Afterward, Tahrir al-Sham declared terminating Liwa al-Aqsa, and promised to watch for any remaining cells in northwestern Syria. On 23 February, the relatives of FSA prisoners executed by Liwa al-Aqsa accused the group of treating them worse than the Syrian regime ever did.

On 9 July 2017, Tahrir al-Sham, utilizing over 1,000 fighters, performed raids in Idlib Governorate against alleged ISIL and Jund al-Aqsa sleeper cells, arresting over 100 fighters.

In March 2018, remnants of Jund al-Aqsa in Sarmin, led by Abu Diab al-Sarmini, regrouped under the name of Ansar al-Tawhid. Other Jund al-Aqsa cells would go on to form the al-Qaeda-affiliated Guardians of Religion Organization. Ansar al-Tawhid reportedly consisted of around 300 fighters. It would later go on to form the al-Qaeda-affiliated Alliance to Support Islam, which included the Guardians of Religion Organization, joined by other hardline members of Tahrir al-Sham and other groups.

On 23 March, suspected Jund al-Aqsa-linked gunmen attacked the headquarters of the Sham Legion in Idlib.

=== Relationship with ISIL ===
In 2014, it was reported that the group was receiving continuous funding from wealthy private Gulf donors for their refusal to attack other rebel groups, part of which was the reason for their rift with al-Nusra Front and Ahrar al-Sham. They reformed after previously fighting the Islamic State of Iraq and the Levant, who hurt the group and also caused them to run into some debt. These Gulf donors, who financed them for this reason, refused to finance groups involved in intra-rebel fighting.

On 23 October 2015, Jund al-Aqsa left the Army of Conquest, because it had misgivings about fighting against the Islamic State of Iraq and the Levant, maintaining a stance that fighting ISIL in an offensive manner was contrary to Islamic law, and it would only fight ISIL defensively if attacked, while reaffirming its loyalty to al-Qaeda. On 17 February 2016, over 400 fighters and senior leaders of Jund al-Aqsa defected to al-Nusra Front.

In the February 2016 Khanasir offensive, Jund al-Aqsa and ISIL temporarily cut off the Syrian government's supply route to Aleppo, sharing war booty captured from Syrian forces before retreating.

In April 2016, fighters from the group sympathetic towards ISIL allegedly gratified the walls outside a girls' school with writings saying "Girls wear Niqabs or we'll cut your necks - soldiers of the Caliphate".

== Leadership ==
Jund al-Aqsa was known to have significant roots in the Gulf, particularly Qatar. This has raised questions about how much these associated Gulf states have contributed in tackling terrorism and its financing, due to the country's lack of pressing charges or convicting known terrorists and terrorist financiers.

Abu Abdul Aziz al-Qatari was the organization's founder and first emir. He was a Jordanian citizen with Palestinian roots. His real name is Muhammed Yusuf Uthman Abd al Salam, and he was reportedly a longtime al-Qaeda associate. Abdul Aziz changed his name according to his move from state to state. He was reported to have worked for al Qaeda in Afghanistan where he was close to militants including Osama bin Laden, Ayman al Zawahiri, and Sheikh Abdullah Azzam. He also fought against the Russian forces in Chechnya, and shortly after helped Abu Musab al-Zarqawi found Jama'at al-Tawhid wal-Jihad, which is known to be the precursor to Al-Qaeda in Iraq (AQI). After the death of Zarqawi, he continued to serve as an official in the militant organization.

He was also a co-founder of al-Nusra Front, al-Qaeda's Syrian branch, with Ahmed al-Sharaa in 2012, after the two were sent to Syria by Abu Bakr al-Baghdadi to form terrorist sleeper cells. At this time he was also involved in financing for the Islamic State.

He was associated with the head of a banned extremist group called the Ummah Party after traveling with him to Syria in 2011 to assist and fund insurgent groups in the region, including Ahrar al Sham. This group drew inspiration from a U.S. and UN sanctioned terrorism financier and Kuwaiti cleric, Hamid bin Hammad al Ali. This group was reported by The New York Times to be backed by the governments of both Turkey and Qatar. He went on to become one of al-Nusra Front's senior ranking leaders.

His sons are both Qatari ID holders, and are sanctioned by both the UN and the United States for their funding of various al Qaeda branches. His sons have been successful in connecting the Jund al Aqsa group with Iranian financing from al Qaeda's network in Iran.

After Abdul Aziz's death in 2014, one of his sons became a leader of Jund al Aqsa. According to Syrian opposition sources, the group is run by several individuals, one of which is Abu Ahmed al Qatari, who is the son of Abdul Aziz. He is known to be the organization's primary financial official, responsible for recruiting new members and buying up independent militias. He holds direct links with wealthy and ideologically extremist Qatari and Kuwaiti businessmen, who finance terrorist groups via charity fronts. Another noteworthy leader is Abu Dharr al Jazrawi, a Saudi national, who, along with Abu Ahmed al Qatari, are accused of allowing the group to be supported and penetrated by Qatari intelligence services.

The last Emir of the group was Abu Thar al-Najdi I-Harthy, a Saudi Arabian citizen.

== Designation as a terrorist organization ==
Country	Date	Reference
United Kingdom	January 2015	
United States	20 September 2016	
Saudi Arabia		
Malaysia	2016	

== See also ==
- List of armed groups in the Syrian Civil War
