= Mountain Hawks Brigade =

Free Syrian army unit

- Liwa’ Suqour al-Jabal لواء صقور الجبل
- Logo of the Mountain Hawks Brigade
- Leader: Capt. Hassan Haj Ali (commander-in-chief)
- Dates active: September 2012–present
- Headquarters: Jabal Zawiya, Idlib Governorate, Syria
- Active regions: Northwest Syria: Idlib Governorate; Aleppo Governorate; Hama Governorate; Latakia Governorate
- Ideology: Syrian nationalism
- Size: 2,500 fighters (own claim, 2016)
- Part of: Free Syrian Army; Free Idlib Army; Hawar Kilis Operations Room; Ahfad al-Rasul Brigades (2012–14); Syria Revolutionaries Front (2014); Jaysh al-Nasr (2015); Mare' Operations Room (2014–2016); Fatah Halab (2015–2016)
- Wars: the Syrian Civil War

The Mountain Hawks Brigade (Arabic: لواء صقور الجبل, romanized: Liwa’ Suqour al-Jabal), known as the Hawks of Mount Zawiya Brigade (Arabic: لواء صقور جبل الزاويه, romanized: Liwa' Suqour Jabal al-Zawiya) between 2012 and 2015 and the Mountain Hawks Division (Arabic: فرقة صقور الجبل, romanized: Firqat Suqour al-Jabal) since 2020, is a Syrian rebel group affiliated with the Free Syrian Army operating in northwestern Syria, mainly in the Idlib Governorate. The group is supported by Turkey and previously by Qatar and Saudi Arabia.

== Composition ==
As of May 2020, the Mountain Hawks Division consists of the following groups:

- 1st Brigade, led by Lieutenant Colonel Nasha'at Haj Ahmad, which left the Mountain Hawks to join Jabhat Fatah al-Sham in September 2016 but returned on 25 January 2017
- 6th Brigade, led by Major Maher al-Mawas
- Revolutionary Idlib Brigade, led by Muhammad al-Khalil
- Revolutionary Mountain Hawks Brigade, led by Haider Hashum
- Revolutionary Mountain Commandos Brigade, led by Qasim Biyur

Izz al-Din Hammoud serves as the speaker of the group's shura council.

== History ==
In September 2012, Hassan Haj Ali, a defected Syrian Army captain, formed the Hawks of Mount Zawiya Brigade as a subunit of the Ahfad al-Rasul Brigades.

According to a former commander of the group, Turkey was supporting FSA and Islamist groups in order to expel the People's Protection Units (YPG) from the border during the Battle of Ras al-Ayn (2012–13).

In early 2014 the Hawks of Mount Zawiya Brigade joined the Syria Revolutionaries Front but later left the SRF due to internal disputes. It was one of the founding members of the 5th Corps but it also became defunct. Since 2014 the group is supplied with BGM-71 TOW missiles from the CIA through Saudi Arabia, Qatar, and Turkey, and is one of the original and most prolific users of the missiles in Syria.

At the beginning of the Russian military intervention in Syria in October 2015, the headquarters of the Mountain Hawks Brigade was hit by 20 air-to-surface missiles from the Russian Air Force. 2 months later, The Mountain Hawks Brigade clashed with the newly founded Syrian Democratic Forces in the northern Aleppo Governorate, capturing a village from the Army of Revolutionaries. Mountain Hawks Brigade fighters then took down and burned the flags of the SDF and the Army of Revolutionaries while chanting "Allahu Akbar". The group also participated along with other Fatah Halab factions in the shelling of the Sheikh Maqsood neighborhood in Aleppo.

During the Northern Aleppo offensive (February 2016), a unit of the Mountain Hawks Brigade consisting of 50 fighters stationed in the town of Deir Jamal in northern Aleppo defected to the Army of Revolutionaries. The unit's commander was captured by another rebel group soon after his defection.

In September 2016, the Mountain Hawks Brigade, along with the Northern Division and the 13th Division, formed the Free Idlib Army, In response to the establishment of the Free Idlib Army, a group of Mountain Hawks Brigade fighters defected to join Jabhat Fatah al-Sham in early October.

Afif Suleiman, the overall commander of the Free Idlib Army, was accused of holding back the Free Idlib Army during the northwestern Syria offensive (December 2019–March 2020) by not sending reinforcements to the frontlines, instead moving himself and the rest of the Free Idlib Army's leadership north to Jindires in Afrin away from the fighting. In response to these accusations and to Suleiman's replacement of the Free Idlib Army leadership to exclude members of the Mountain Hawks Division, the Mountain Hawks, which were half of the Free Idlib Army, stated on 13 May 2020 that they no longer recognized Suleiman as their commander, and demanded that he be court martialed for treason.

On 8 October 2020, a military commander of the Mountain Hawks, Nayrouz al-Hamdo, was killed by Syrian government and Russian aerial and artillery bombardment in the village of Kansafra.

== See also ==
- List of armed groups in the Syrian Civil War
