= Syrian Revolutionary Command Council =

Alliance of Syrian rebel factions involved in the Syrian Civil War

- مجلس قيادة الثورة السورية
- Logo of the SRCC
- Leaders: Qais Abdullah Sheikh (president); Lt. Gen. Hajj Ali (military leader); Mohammed Alloush (political leader)
- Dates active: 3 August 2014 – February 2016
- Groups: Free Syrian Army; Islamic Front; Ajnad al-Sham Islamic Union; Jabhat Ansar al-Islam; Jabhat Haqq al-Muqatala; Al-Jabha al-Suriyya lil-Tahrir
- Active regions: Syria
- Ideology: Anti-Assadism
- Wars: the Syrian Civil War

The Syrian Revolutionary Command Council (Arabic: مجلس قيادة الثورة السورية, romanized: Majlis Qiyādat ath-Thawra as-Sūriyya) was an alliance of 72 Syrian rebels factions involved in the Syrian Civil War and remained active throughout 2015.

The aim of the council was to increase the coordination and unity between the different groups, with the council planned to be divided into regional fronts that will be led by councils made up of representatives from the different factions, similar to how the Free Syrian Army was structured. The signatories represent both secular and Islamist groups; however al-Qaeda's al-Nusra Front and some of its allies were excluded. Initially Ahrar ash-Sham was also excluded, however the group did join the alliance in mid August 2014. The group announced its charter on 4 October 2014. It held its first formal meeting in Gaziantep, Turkey on 29 November 2014.

== Conflict within the coalition ==
Immediately following the first formal meeting of the Syrian Revolutionary Command Council, Col. Muhammad Hallak expressed skepticism toward the October document on which the new group is based, saying it was written to ensure an Islamic government after Assad is toppled. Col. Hallak was quoted as saying: “The covenant itself doesn't mention the idea of free elections and most of the groups represented in the executive office don’t believe in the original democratic values of the revolution".

In early December 2014, the Hazzm Movement withdrew its affiliation from the Syrian Revolutionary Command Council as a result of clashes between it and the al-Nusra Front in Syria. In the same time period, the southern branch of the Syria Revolutionaries Front declared that they have no connection to the Syrian Revolutionary Command Council. The Hazzm Movement and the Syria Revolutionaries Front had been routed in the northern province of Idlib by al-Nusra Front and its allies in November.

As of late 2015, the council is no longer active.
