= Kafr Nabl =

Kafr Nabl كَفْرنَبِل Kafranbel
- Town
- Location in Syria
- Coordinates: 35°36′50″N 36°33′40″E
- Country: Syria
- Governorate: Idlib
- District: Maarrat al-Nu'man
- Subdistrict: Kafr Nabl
- Elevation: 735 m (2,411 ft)

Population (2004)
  - Total: 15,455

Kafr Nabl (Arabic: كَفْرنَبِل, romanized: Kafr Nabil, also spelled Kafranbel or Kafr Nabil) is a town administratively belonging to the Idlib Governorate and Ma'arrat al-Numan District in northwestern Syria. It is situated 735 meters (2,411 ft) above sea level. In the 2004 census by the Syrian Central Bureau of Statistics Kafr Nabl had a population of 15,455. In the early 1960s it had a population of about 1,200. Kafr Nabl's inhabitants are predominantly Sunni Muslim.

== History ==
Kafr Nabl is located on an ancient Byzantine dead city, and is surrounded by some of the most important Dead Cities, such as Serjilla, Shanshrah, and al-Bara.

Prior to the Syrian civil war, Kafr Nabl was Syria's largest producer of figs and a major producer of olives. About 3,700 hectares, or 778,000 trees were used for fig cultivation. Roughly 60% of the population were employed in the production and natural processing of the fruit. Farmers in Kafr Nabl usually dedicated around 80% of their cultivation time to the production of figs and 20% for olives.

Since the civil war, the town has gained fame for producing satirical videos about the war. It belonged to an area controlled by the Army of Conquest.

Planes of the Russian Air Force, based in Latakia, had begun to attack the city in the autumn of 2015.

On November 23, 2018, activist Raed Fares and journalist Hamoud Junaid were killed in Kafr Nabl, by an unknown gunman.

Most of the town's remaining inhabitants fled in early 2019, due to the violence that erupted during the 2019 Northwestern Syria offensive. Shortly thereafter, the rebel groups in control of the town received a "stark warning" from Russia, which accused them of using it to stage alleged false-flag chemical attacks against the Syrian government, as well as a launching ground for missiles targeting government-controlled areas in violation of the Idlib demilitarization agreement. On 21 July 2019, the local council of the rebel-held town declared that "everything [in the town] had been destroyed and burnt" as a result of clashes and government airstrikes targeting rebel positions within it.

On February 25, 2020, the Syrian Army reimposed control on Kafr Nabl for the first time since 2012 during the 2019–20 Northwestern Syria offensive and repulsed rebel attempts to re-take it during their counterattack.

On November 30, 2024, Tahrir al-Sham liberated the city once again during the Operation Deterrence of Aggression.

== Bibliography ==
- Giuliani, Alessandra (2007), Developing Markets for Agrobiodiversity: Securing Livelihoods in Dryland Areas, Earthscan, ISBN 978-1-84407-468-6
- Carter, Terry (2008), Syria and Lebanon, Lonely Planet, ISBN 978-1-74104-609-0
