= Abu Ali Bard =

Syrian Rebel Leader

Abu Ali Bard ابو علي برد
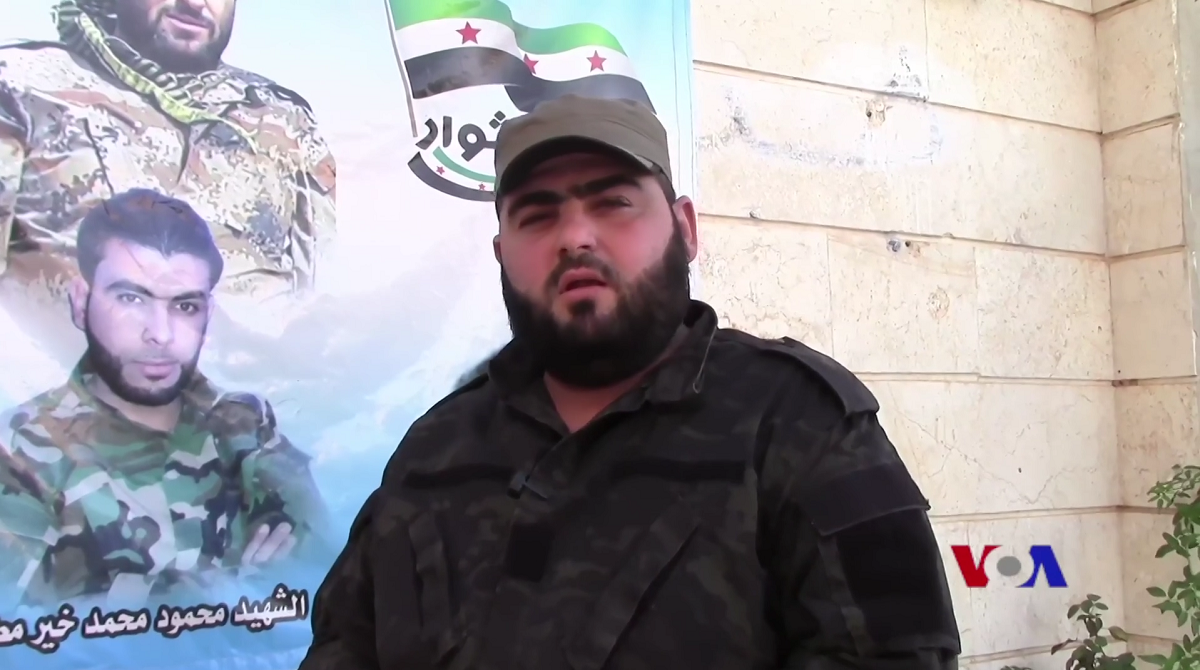
- Abu Ali Bard
- Born: January 1, 1987 (age 39); Taftanaz
- Military career
- Allegiance: Free Syrian Army (until 2025); Syrian Martyrs' Brigades; Syrian Revolutionaries Front; Army of Revolutionaries; Syrian Democratic Forces (until 2026)
- Service years: 2011–present
- Conflicts: Syrian Civil War; In Idlib Governorate; Idlib Governorate clashes (September 2011–March 2012); Battle of Taftanaz; Battle of Saraqeb; April 2012 Idlib Governorate Operation; Idlib Governorate clashes (June 2012–April 2013); Siege of Abu al-Duhur Airbase; Siege of Wadi Deif (2012–2013); Siege of Wadi Deif (2014); 2014 Idlib offensive; In Hama Governorate; 2012 Hama offensive; 2013 Hama offensive; In Aleppo Governorate; Battle of Aleppo (2012–2016); Northern Aleppo offensive (February 2016); Siege of Base 46; Deir ez-Zor clashes (2011–2014); Raqqa campaign (2012–2013); Al-Nusra Front–SRF/Hazzm Movement conflict; Operation Euphrates Shield; Deir ez-Zor campaign (2017–19); Battle of Baghuz Fawqani; Operation Olive Branch

Abu Ali Bard, whose birth name is Abdul Malik Bard, is a Syrian military officer who served in the Free Syrian Army during the Syrian Civil War. The commander of Jaysh al-Thuwar, a FSA group operating as part of the US-backed Syrian Democratic Forces, Bard led rebel troops against government forces and the Islamic State in Eastern Syria as well as participating in the defense against the Turkish Invasion of Northern Syria.

== Biography ==
=== Background ===
He had been described as dedicated to the cause of the Syrian revolution, and would carry himself as an "Islamic Mujahid" while also singing traditional Ataaba music and enjoyed smoking cigarettes, also criticizing Chechen foreign jihadists calling them "Chechen dogs", and participating in several battles against the Syrian government according to activists.

=== Anti-government activities ===
Abu Ali Bard is from the town of Taftanaz in the Idlib Governorate in northwestern Syria, he has been described as one of the first civilians to take up arms against the Ba'athist government led by Bashar al-Assad and joined the Syrian Martyrs' Brigade that was founded by the rebel commander Jamal Maarouf in 2012. From 2012 to 2015 he took part in several battles alongside rebel forces including the al-Nusra Front, in 2013 he became a member of the Syrian Revolutionaries Front led by Maarouf and was made head of the group's special forces unit.

=== Jaysh al-Thuwar ===
In an interview explaining why he decided to join the Syrian Democratic Forces, he said it was after the battles in Kobani and in Tel Abyad that he was impressed with the military unity and organization among the groups that took part in those battles that went on to form SDF, in comparison to the disunity and infighting among the rest of the rebels.

After the formation of Jaysh al-Thuwar in 2016 he commanded the group in its assault against other rebel groups in northern Aleppo alongside the Kurdish YPG under the then newly formed SDF coalition, taking control of Tell Rifaat and the Menagh Military Airbase that had been held by the rebels since capturing it from the Syrian government in 2013.

In March 2018, in response to the Turkish military and allied rebel groups launching a military operation in Afrin, which at the time was held by the Syrian Democratic Forces, Abu Ali announced that Jaysh al-Thuwar would redeploy fighters from fronts with ISIS to fight Turkey and allied rebel forces in Afrin, saying that the decision was made “at a time of international silence in the face of the barbarism of the Turks against civilians.”

In May 2019, in response to the beginning of a Syrian government offensive backed by Russia, Hezbollah and Iran, Jaysh al-Thuwar released a statement saying the group would take part in the defense of Idlib, where Bard originates from and fight against an Iranian-Shiite invasion.
