= Afif Suleiman =

Syrian rebel leader

Afif Suleiman Arabic: عفيف السليمان
- Born: 1966 (age 59–60); Maasaran, Idlib Governorate, Syria
- Military career
- Allegiance: Syrian Arab Republic (until 2011); Syrian Opposition (2012–2024)
- Branch: Syrian Arab Air Force (until 2011); Free Syrian Army (2011–2025); Syrian Revolutionaries Front (2014); National Front for Liberation (2018–2025); Syrian National Army (2019–2025)
- Service years: ?–2011; 2011–?
- Rank: Colonel (until 2020); Brigadier general (since 2020)
- Units: Northern Shield Battalion (2012); Revolutionary Military Council in Idlib Governorate (2012–2014); Free Idlib Army (2016–2025)
- Conflicts: Syrian Civil War; Hama Governorate clashes (2011–2012); Idlib Governorate clashes (September 2011 – March 2012); Idlib Governorate clashes (June 2012–April 2013); Opposition–Islamic State conflict during the Syrian civil war; 2014 Idlib offensive

Afif Mahmoud Suleiman (Arabic: عفيف محمود السليمان; born 1966) is a Syrian military officer who served in the Free Syrian Army during the Syrian Civil War. Born in the Idlib Governorate of northwest Syria, he led the Revolutionary Military Council there from 2012 to 2014 before serving as commander-in-chief of the Free Idlib Army.

== Biography ==
=== Early war ===
Afif Mahmoud Suleiman was born in the village of Maasaran in the Idlib Governorate in 1966. He served in an electronic insurance brigade of the Syrian Arab Air Force with the rank of colonel until he announced his defection from Syrian government forces on 26 October 2011 or 6 January 2012 in the Hama Governorate, along with 30 of his soldiers. His defection was broadcast on Al Jazeera Mubasher and he said that he pleaded with the Arab League to visit mass graves inside Syria but his pleas were ignored.

After his defection, Suleiman commanded the Abu al-Fida Battalion of the Free Syrian Army in the area between Hama and Idlib. He then moved further north into Idlib around Maarat al-Nu'man, established the Northern Shield Battalion alongside 5 other defected officers on 21 February 2012, and in early or mid-April he established the Idlib Military Council. According to Joseph Holliday of the Institute for the Study of War, Suleiman's council gained the support of about 70% of rebel groups in the governorate at the time of its establishment.

On the day following the Houla massacre of 25 May 2012, Suleiman declared the end of the United Nations-brokered Syrian ceasefire and announced that his group would resume attacks against government forces. His fighters shot down a Syrian Air Force MiG-21 as it took off from Abu al-Duhur Military Airbase on 30 August.

By September 2012, the Idlib Military Council and other FSA military councils had been receiving supplies of weapons and funding from Saudi Arabia and Qatar through a control room in Istanbul, Turkey. Lebanese Future Movement politician Okab Sakr oversaw the allocations of supplies to different rebel groups from the control room. Suleiman accused Sakr of favoring several groups within the Idlib Military Council, including Jamal Maarouf's Syrian Martyrs' Brigades, which reportedly held a neutral view of the Muslim Brotherhood. This, according to Suleiman, created a rift within the Idlib Military Council, and he requested his Saudi allies to confirm no aid except through the military councils, and they promised to do so. Suleiman said in early 2013 that it was clear he and his Idlib Military Council had no control over rebel groups in the region, and that he had little to offer these groups other than nominal organization and occasional supplies of weapons and ammunition.

Suleiman and other rebel military council leaders, who were applauded by United States officials, and supported by the US attended a 3-day conference of the Syrian National Council and other Syrian opposition groups in Doha, Qatar, that resulted in the formation of the National Coalition for Syrian Revolutionary and Opposition Forces, commonly referred to as the Syrian National Coalition or the Syrian Opposition Coalition, in early November 2012. Robert Stephen Ford, who served as the US ambassador to Syria from 2010 to 2014, claimed that Suleiman, Abdul Jabbar al-Oqaidi, and other military council leaders denounced sectarianism within rebel ranks in 2012 and 2013, but began cooperating with sectarian Islamist groups including al-Qaeda's al-Nusra Front in order to fight government forces despite Ford's and other US officials' concerns.

On 9 December 2013, Suleiman's Idlib Military Council joined with other groups including Jamal Maarouf's Syria Martyrs’ Brigades, the Idlib Martyrs' Brigade, and the Farouq Battalions of Hama to form the Syrian Revolutionaries Front as a counter to the recently formed Islamic Front, which had captured the Supreme Military Council's warehouses containing foreign-supplied weapons at Bab al-Hawa Border Crossing three days earlier.

In early 2014, Suleiman was one of the rebel leaders who oversaw the offensive that led to the Islamic State of Iraq and the Levant's withdrawal from the Idlib Governorate. Following ISIL's victory in the Northern Iraq offensive (June 2014), Suleiman said that he was concerned ISIL would use the funding and heavy weapons they seized in Iraq to launch a counter-offensive against the rebels in Syria. He then via Skype at a panel discussion in Washington, D.C., on 12 June requested weapons from the US in order to fight ISIL. Two days later, on 14 June, Suleiman along with 8 other FSA military council commanders, all colonels or lieutenant colonels, resigned from their councils due to the lack of funding.

At one point prior to September 2014, Suleiman was detained in King Abdulaziz International Airport in Jeddah, refused entry into Saudi Arabia, had his Syrian passport confiscated, and was told to collect it at the Syrian government's administration in Aleppo.

=== Late war ===
On 31 July 2019, Suleiman and his son were arrested by Hayat Tahrir al-Sham's security force at a checkpoint at the Ghazawiya crossing near Darat Izza as they were driving from Afrin District to the northern Idlib Governorate. Suleiman was detained in HTS's Oqab Prison in Jabal Zawiya, and released two days later.

Suleiman has been the subject of criticism and condemnation among opposition circles following the end of the northwestern Syria offensive (December 2019–March 2020). A source told Step News Agency that he demobilized fighters of the Free Idlib Army who were killed in combat in order to avoid paying financial support to their families, and did not send reinforcements to the frontlines during the offensive, instead moving himself and the rest of the Free Idlib Army's leadership north to Jindires in Afrin away from the fighting. The same source accused him of providing fake lists of fighters to his backers, mainly Turkey, and hoarding millions of dollars' worth of money he obtained by corrupt activities including stealing and selling truckloads of food Turkey sends to the Free Idlib Army.

In response to these accusations and to Suleiman's replacement of the Free Idlib Army leadership to exclude members of the Mountain Hawks Division, the Mountain Hawks stated on 13 May that they no longer recognized Suleiman as their commander, and demanded that he be court martialed for treason.

On 18 August 2020, Shaam News Network obtained a document signed by Suleiman which decreed that a group of Free Idlib Army fighters stationed on the Latakia front were have their salaries reduced by LS 50,000 as a fine for the loss of three blankets and two sponges. This sparked outrage and Step News Agency further claimed that Suleiman intended to move his entire force to the Turkish-occupied region to the north and punished those who stayed in Idlib.

In an interview with Enab Baladi in March 2021, Suleiman said that 1,400 Free Idlib Army fighters have been killed by that time, and that only families of killed fighters were who married are paid, in amounts of TL 100–150 per month.
