= 2014 Idlib offensive =

Rebel advances

- Part of the Syrian Civil War
- Map of frontlines following the offensive. Territorial changes as a result of the offensive can be seen south of Maarrat al-Nu'man/north of Morek.
Date	5 March – 25 May 2014 (2 months, 2 weeks and 6 days)
Location	Idlib Governorate, Syria
Result	Rebel victory: Rebels lift the Army siege of Khan Shaykhun and secure the city and its surroundings; Rebels cut two supply lines to Army bases in Idlib governorate; Rebels capture two towns on the highway towards Maarrat al-Nu'man

Belligerents
Free Syrian Army; Islamic Front; Sham Legion; Al-Nusra Front; Jund al-Aqsa; Liwaa al-Umma	(Syria) Syrian Arab Republic; Syrian Armed Forces; National Defense Force

Commanders and leaders
Colonel Afif Suleiman (head of Idlib's rebel Military Council); Jamal Maarouf (leader of the Syrian Martyrs' Brigade); Bilal Atar (leader of Hazzm movement); Ahmed Abu Issa (Leader of Suqour al-Sham Brigade); Hassan Abboud (leader of Ahrar ash-Sham); Hassan Aboud (leader of Liwa Dawud)	Unknown

Units involved
Free Syrian Army; Syria Revolutionaries Front; Syrian Martyrs' Brigade; Hazzm Movement; Jabhat Thuwar Saraqib; Islamic Front; Ahrar ash-Sham; Jaysh al-Sham; Liwa Dawud; Suqour al-Sham Brigade	Syrian Army; 1st Armoured Division; 76th Armoured Brigade; Artillery Regiment; 17th Reserve Division; 93rd Armoured Brigade; 15th Special Forces Division; 35th SF Regiment; 41st SF Regiment; 45th SF Regiment

Casualties and losses
36–60+ rebels killed	64+ Syrian soldiers killed

The 2014 Idlib offensive was a series of operations conducted by the rebels against the Syrian Government in the Idlib Governorate during the Syrian Civil War. The clashes were mostly concentrated around Khan Shaykhun and on the highway towards Maarrat al-Nu'man.

== Rebel offensive ==
Map showing the siege of Khan Shaykhun

The rebels began the operation on 5 March; three days later it was reported that the rebels were trying to cut the road between Idlib and Al-Mastuma in an attempt to surround the city of Idlib. A day after the report of the offensive the SOHR reported that a commander of an FSA battalion was assassinated by unknown gunmen between the villages of Kafar-Sejna and Al-Rekaya.

Free Syrian Army units and other rebel troops charted moderate gains since the start of their operation. On 12 March, pro-opposition sources claimed the rebels cut the M-5 highway at Khan Shaykhun; 13 days later it was reported that the rebels seized 15 Syrian Army checkpoints in Khan Shaykhun after days of fighting. According to Col. Afif al-Suleimani, head of Idlib's rebel Military Council, the Army withdrew many of its soldiers from Idlib province to reinforce their forces in Latakia province after the 2014 rebel offensive at Latakia was launched against the coastal area. The rebels then advanced towards Khan Shaykhun resulted in both the lifting of the siege of the town and cutting the supply line to Syrian Army bases further north in the province. Also, on 29 March, they reportedly captured parts of the Shiite town of Al-Fu'ah, northeast of Idlib city.

On 4 April, four rebels were reportedly killed by clashes around Sehyan checkpoint north of Khan Shaykhun. It was also reported that Baboulin town and al-Salhiya village were captured by the rebels, thus cutting off the supply route and highway to the Wadi Deif and Hamidiyah army bases at Maaret al-Numan. At least 18 regular soldiers were reportedly killed in the clashes and two tanks were disabled. After Baboulin was captured, clashes took place along a nearby 20-mile stretch of highway between Morek and Maaret al-Numan. A day later, the SOHR reported that the rebels seized a checkpoint at Khan Shaykhoun over night. On 8 April, rebels detonated two suicide cars at the Khazanat fueling base east of Khan Shaykhun, followed by clashes and three days later reportedly took an Army checkpoint at the crossroads of the Heish, but Syrian Army units took it back the next day. Despite this setback, the rebels captured the al-Sayyad checkpoint the same day after heavy clashes with Army units in the southeast of Khan Shaykhoun according to the SOHR.

On 15 April, 21 rebels (including a defected officer and a battalion commander) and a number of Army soldiers were reportedly killed in clashes around Qmenas town. In addition, 6 rebels were killed while no less than 40 were injured, and the connection was lost with 25 rebels after an ambush by Syrian Army units around Al-Hamedya camp It was also reported that the FSA affiliated Hazzm Movement had received 20 TOW anti-tank missiles from a "Western source".

On 5 May, rebels detonated a 'tunnel bomb' under the al-Sahabh checkpoint in the east of Khan Shaykhoun and captured it. According to the SOHR, about 30 pro-government fighters (including two officers) were killed in the blast. Pro-government sources denied this claim and only reported several wounded. On 14 May, the Wadi al-Deif base was struck by another 'tunnel bomb'. According to the SOHR, tens of pro-government fighters were killed and wounded by the explosion.

On 24 May, according to the SOHR, rebels launched an offensive towards Hish and reportedly captured the Kafr Bassin and Hish intersection Army checkpoints. The next day, six car bombs were detonated by the rebels: Four at checkpoints in the Al Arba’in Mountain area and two at the Khazanat Army base east of Khan Shaykhoun. According to the SOHR, tens of pro-government fighters were killed and injured by the blasts in the Al Arba’in Mountain area and at least 16 in the Khazanat base. The attacks resulted in rebel advances in the Al Arba’in Mountain area and the capture of the Khazanat base. Pro-government sources denied all of this and claimed that the army was advancing in the Al Arba’in area. The following day, rebels captured the al-Salam checkpoint west of Khan Shaykhoun, thus completely securing Khan Shaykhoun and its surroundings, and a checkpoint in the Hish area. Four rebels (including a commander) were killed during the takeover of the Khazanat base on the 25th.

== Aftermath ==
On 27 October, Al-Nusra stormed government positions around Idlib in an attempt to cut the supply lines to the city. Later that same day, the army recaptured all buildings and strategic points held by Al-Nusra in and near the city.
