= Deif =

Deif may refer to:

== People ==
- Ibrahim Deif (born 1962), Egyptian academic
- Mohammed Deif (1965–2024), Palestinian militant
  - Deif family killings, August 2014 airstrike at the home of Mohammed Deif
  - 13 July 2024 al-Mawasi attack, July 2024 airstrike targeting Mohammed Deif
- Nazih Deif (born 1923), Egyptian economist
- Salma Abu Deif (born 1993), Egyptian actress
- El Deif Ahmed (born 1936), Egyptian actor

== Other ==
- Siege of Wadi Deif (2012–2013), siege during the Syrian Civil War
- Siege of Wadi Deif (2014), siege during the Syrian Civil War
- Diouf
- Joof
