= Liwa Aqab al-Islami =

Jihadist group

Liwa Aqab al-Islami لواء العقاب الإسلامي
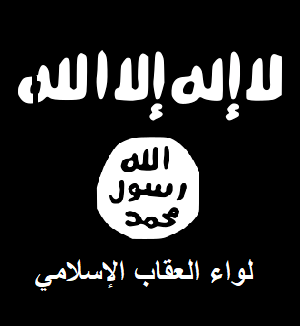
- Flag of Liwa Aqab al-Islami
- Leaders: Saddam al-Khalifah; Rashid Tukwa
- Dates active: Unknown-December 2014
- Headquarters: Qasr Ibn Wardan, Hama Governorate, Syria
- Active regions: Northwestern Syria
- Ideology: Islamism: Salafi Jihadism
- Wars: Syrian Civil War

Liwa Aqab al-Islami or the Islamic Punishment Brigade was an armed Syrian Salafi Jihadist rebel group based in northwestern Syria primarily in the Hama Governorate, held close ties to the Islamic State of Iraq and the Levant, including its leadership allegedly secretly pledging allegiance to ISIL, and carried out public executions and amputations, as well as enforcing Islamic law until it was forcibly dissolved by the al-Nusra Front in December 2014 due to its association with ISIL.

== History ==
The group was established by Saddam al-Khalifa and Rashid Tukwa and held a strong presence in the eastern countryside of the Hama Governorate, but the group also operated in the Aleppo and Idlib Governorates in northwestern Syria.

After the breakout of fighting between ISIL and other anti-government factions the group distanced itself from both ISIL and the Free Syrian Army, however continued to hold ties to ISIL and handle ISIL's affairs in areas of Hama underneath their control. However after al-Nusra and other opposition groups expelled ISIL from northwestern Syria, Saddam al-Khilafah allegedly pledged allegiance to ISIL secretly.

On 30 March 2014, the Islamic Punishment Brigade attacked a Syrian government checkpoint near Khanasir, with heavy and medium weapons, reportedly killing several Syrian army soldiers then withdrew from the area. The Free Syrian Army's Hama Military Council said that the attack was carried out in order to relieve pressure from the then ongoing rebel offensive to take Murak.

In October 2014, the group stoned a woman in Hama for committing adultery.

On 17 October 2014, after the break out of fighting between al-Nusra and the Syrian Revolutionaries Front, the Islamic Punishment Brigade joined the conflict on the side of al-Nusra against SRF and fought alongside them in the Jabal Zawiya and Maarrat al-Nu'man against SRF, allegedly to exploit the conflict and help expand ISIL's influence in Idlib and facilitate its return to northwestern Syria by fighting SRF and the western-backed Hazzm Movement that SRF was allied with against al-Nusra. Soon after however al-Nusra established checkpoints near the then besieged Abu al-Duhur Military Airbase, and arrested members of the Islamic Punishment Brigade.

On 23 December 2014, Jabhat al-Nusra raided the group's headquarters in Qasr Ibn Wardan because of the group's closeness with ISIL. During the raid the group's leader Saddam al-Khalifa was captured by al-Nusra and several of the Punishment Brigade's fighters were killed in heavy clashes with al-Nusra in Qasr Ibn Wardan that began on the previous day.

On 25 December 2014, the group beheaded the nephew of the then Syria's defense minister, Fahd Jassem al-Freij in Hama. Their activists claimed that Freij's nephew was a member of the Shabiha and was involved in massacres against civilians.

== See also ==
- Liwa Dawud
- Yarmouk Martyrs Brigade
- Saddam al-Jamal
