= Al-Nusra Front–SRF/Hazzm Movement conflict =

2014 event during the Syrian Civil War

- Part of the Syrian Civil War and the inter-rebel conflict during the Syrian Civil War
- Map of the territorial expansion of al-Nusra during the conflict. Al-Nusra territory before offensive Al-Nusra territory after offensive
Date	26 October 2014 – 1 March 2015 (4 months and 3 days)
Location	Northwestern Syria
Result	Decisive al-Nusra Front victory: Al-Nusra captures the entire Zawiya Mountain region, seven towns in other provinces and three military bases; Most SRF fighters defect or desert, while the Hazzm Movement and Syrian Salvation Front are dissolved

Belligerents
Al-Nusra Front; Jund al-Aqsa; Ahrar al-Sham (from 2015); Supported by: Knights of Justice Brigade (alleged); Islamic State (limited involvement)	Free Syrian Army

Commanders and leaders
Ahmed al-Sharaa (Al-Nusra Front leader)	Jamal Maarouf (SRF leader); Abu Ali Bard (SRF leader); Bilal Atar (Hazzm Movement leader); Abdullah Awda (Hazzm Movement leader); Mithqal al-Abdullah (Ansar Brigades leader)

Units involved
Liwa Aqab al-Islami	Syrian Revolutionaries Front; Syrian Martyrs' Brigades; Idlib Martyrs' Brigade; Ansar Brigades; Hazzm Movement; Syrian Salvation Front; Free Zawiya Brigade; al-Qa'qa' Brigade; Northern Knights Brigade; (Syrian opposition) 7th Brigade

Strength
6,100–7,100 fighters total	Several thousand

Casualties and losses
40+ killed, 25 captured	80+ killed, hundreds defected or fled

Al-Nusra Front–SRF/Hazzm Movement conflict ensued in late October 2014, during the Syrian Civil War, in Idlib and Aleppo governorates, during which Al-Nusra Front attempted to establish an Islamic emirate to rival that of IS. Despite this, al-Nusra Front and Free Syrian Army factions continued to cooperate in the southern Syrian governorates of Quneitra and Daraa.

== Background ==
Before the clashes, there were already tensions between Jabhat Al-Nusra and the Syrian Revolutionaries Front. 100 members of the latter had been killed by Al-Nusra during clashes in July 2014. After that, Nusra launched the 2014 Idlib city raid, which resulted in a failure. They blamed the Syrian Revolutionaries Front for the failure, because, according to Al-Nusra, the SRF stabbed them in the back. Then, they launched the offensive. However, according to the Syrian Observatory for Human Rights (SOHR), the clashes between the two sides already started the day before the raid.

== Conflict ==
=== Zawiya Mountain offensive (October–November 2014) ===
The clashes between the two sides erupted on 26 October 2014, with conflicting information about the reason. Between 27 and 28 October, the Al-Nusra Front attacked the SRF and took over the towns and villages of Balyon, Kesafra, Eblin, Ebdita, Mashon, Maghara and Maghara as well as four of their checkpoints near Maarrat Al-Nu'man. "This has happened before and we came through it. But this time the mobilisation is very large," said a military official in the SRF. He added that the SRF had taken 25 Al-Nusra fighters prisoner. He also claimed IS fighters were reinforcing the Nusra Front in the assault. But the Syrian Observatory for Human Rights (SOHR) said that it was another hardline group, Jund al-Aqsa, that was providing the backup.

On 28 October, the Al-Nusra Front also attacked a checkpoint of the Hazzm Movement in western Aleppo countryside but this attack was repelled and a number of Nusra fighters were reportedly killed. At the same time the Al-Atareb area and the Regiment 46 witnessed a "tension and wait-and-see attitude" after these clashes. Another clash took place between the two parties in the area between Ma’er Debseh and Khan Al-Sobol in the Idlib countryside.

On 29 October, Army of Mujahedeen took over the Hazzm Movement checkpoints around Al-Atarib, while Ahl Al-Sham was expected to take over the Al-Nusra checkpoints in the same area as part of a deal between the rebel groups. Both parties agreed to release all detainees afterwards.

On 30 October, clashes in Khan Al-Sibel between the Hazzm Movement against Al-Nusra left three fighters dead.

On 31 October 15 Islamic battalions formed the "al-Sohl (peace-keeping) forces" and sent them to the Al-Zawiya mount area, where the Al-Nusra Front and the SRF were still fighting, in order to separate the two parties from each other. The 15 battalions included: the Army of Mujahedeen, Nour Al-Din Al-Zanki Islamic Brigades, Sham Legion, the 13th Division, Omar Al-Mukhtar Brigade, the Hazzm Movement, Ahrar al-Sham, Liwa Al-Haqq, Syrian Liberation Front, the Al-Awal Brigade, Suqour Al-Sham, and Jaysh Al-Islam.

Meanwhile, fighting raged between the SRF and Al-Nusra in the village of Deir Sinbel, with both sides suffering heavy losses. Before reaching Deir Sinbel, Al-Nusra had captured a dozen villages in the area. The next day, Al-Nusra forced the SRF to retreat from the village. With the fall of Deir Sinbel, Nusra had taken control of most towns and villages on the Zawiya Mountain. This also caused many SRF fighters join Al-Nusra Front. At the same time, IS sent some of its fighters to the contested area (al-Barah, Kensafrah and the eastern Ma’arret Al-Nu’man countryside) to aid Al-Nusra in their fight against the SRF, some of whom were involved in the fight for Deir Sinbel. The Knights of Justice Brigade also reportedly sent a truck carrying ammunition to support Al-Nusra in Deir Sinbel, and later handed over ammunition depots to Al-Nusra, along with setting up joint checkpoints at the entrances and exits of Kafr Nabl.

After this, Al-Nusra Front agreed to a proposed cease-fire, starting at 2 o'clock, but demanded that Jamal Maarouf had to appear before a Sharia court within 24 hours after the judge's request.

On 2 November, Al-Nusra seized Khan al-Subul, in the Idlib province, after Hazzm Movement fighters retreated from the town. Al-Nusra further took control of the villages/towns of Maar Shurin, Ma'saran, Dadikh, Kafr Battikh, and Kafr Rumah from the Islamist rebels and Hazzm Movement, thus taking over almost the entire Zawiya mountain area.

On 3 November, Al-Nusra fighters were reportedly gathering in the town of Sarmada in Idlib province, some 4 miles (6 kilometers) from the Bab Al-Hawa border crossing that is held by the Islamic Front. If Al-Nusra Front seized the crossing, it would block an important supply line for the Western-backed rebels. By that point, the Hazzm Movement was completely defeated. Hundreds of its members defected or escaped; its cache of American weapons was seized by the Al-Nusra Front, and the group's leader and some 50 remaining fighters left the area and headed for Aleppo.

The next day, the Northern Knights Brigades in Aleppo province retreated from Menagh Military Airbase, burning a T-62 tank, while Al-Nusra advanced.

On 7 November, Al-Nusra Front, with the support of Jund Al-Aqsa, seized the villages of Safuhin, Fatirah and Hazarin in the southern countryside of Idlib, as well as the village of Flayfel in the Shahshabo Mountain.

=== Further Al-Nusra advances (November 2014–March 2015) ===
On 29 November, Syrian activist Omar Jassim, said that Al-Nusra Front seized the city of Al-Rastan, in the Homs province, and captured a large number of Free Syrian Army fighters after clashes between the two sides, and subsequently established a number of checkpoints in the city.

On 30 November, Al-Nusra executed 13 Syrian rebels in Kawkaba, in the south of the Idlib province, after taking the village.

At the end of December 2014, Al-Nusra seized another Hazzm Movement post in the Kafar Karmin area of the western countryside of Aleppo.

On 29 January 2015, Al-Nusra expelled the rebels from the Regiment 111 base in Aleppo province. At least four rebel fighters were killed in the fighting at the base. The next day, fighting spread to Idlib province where several small Al-Nusra checkpoints were attacked and overrun in the Jabal Al-Zawiya area. Clashes also occurred at the rebel-held Regiment 46 base during the previous night. By the end of the day, Al-Nusra's ally Ahrar al-Sham captured the Bab Al-Hawa border crossing with Turkey from the Hazzm Movement after fighting between Hazzm and Al-Nusra.

On 16 February, Al-Nusra stormed the headquarters of the 7th Brigade (part of the FSA's 101st Division) in the village of Ayn Laroz in the Zawiya Mountain and captured a large cache of weapons after it took control of the FSA's posts. This was the last FSA stronghold in the area.

On 25 February, Al-Nusra declared war on the Hazzm Movement and two days later attacked the Hazzm-held Base 46, west of Aleppo city. By 1 March, they captured the base, Meznaz, Kafar Nouran, Al-Mashtal, the area of Al-Mohandsin and Daret Ezzeh. 60 Hazzm and 40 Nusra fighters were killed. Following the losses, the Hazzm movement dissolved itself, and its remnants joined the Levant Front.

== Strategic importance ==
The Syrian Army victories during the 2014 Hama offensive and the Battle of Murak left the southern countryside of Idlib vulnerable. The infighting between the Al-Nusra Front and the SRF endangered the newly formed frontline in the south of Khan Shaykhun. With the loss of its bastion in Idlib, the SRF was left with only a presence in southern Syria. Western-backed rebel groups in Syria were coming under growing pressure as government forces continued to advance in the country's west and south.
