= Abdullah Awda =

Syrian rebel leader

- عبد الله عودة
- Born: Homs Governorate, Syria
- Known for: Leader of the Hazzm Movement
- Military career
- Allegiance: (Ba'athist Syria) SAA (until 2011) (Syria) FSA (2011–present)
- Branch: 675th Battalion; Free Officers Movement; Farouq al-Shamal Battalions; Hazzm Movement
- Service years: Until 2015
- Rank: 1st Lieutenant
- Conflicts: Syrian Civil War; Al-Nusra Front–SRF/Hazzm Movement conflict; Opposition–Islamic State conflict during the Syrian civil war

Abdullah Awda (Arabic: عبد الله عودة), also known by his nom de guerre Abu Zeid, was a rebel leader in northern Syria during the earlier stages of the Syrian Civil War. He was the leader of the Hazzm Movement, part of the Free Syrian Army.

== Biography ==
Abdullah Awda held the rank of 1st Lieutenant in the Syrian Arab Army (675th Battalion, 87th Brigade, 11th Division) when he defected in 2011 and subsequently joined the Free Officers Movement during the Syrian Civil War. He later became the leader of Farouq al-Shamal Battalions, who joined the Syrian Revolutionaries Front in December 2013.

From 2014, Awda commanded the US-backed Hazzm Movement in its fight against the Islamic State.

In January 2015, the al-Nusra Front attacked the Hazzm Movement in northern Aleppo countryside, forcing it to dissolve. Awda, together with other rebel leaders, fled to Turkey and went in exile.

On 16 December 2016, Awda and other leaders of groups ousted by al-Nusra declared their willingness to return to Syria. Their statement was handwritten and signed by Awda, Jamal Maarouf (Syria Revolutionaries Front), Mithqal al-Abdullah (Ansar Brigades) and Youssef al-Hassan (Haq al-Muqatila Front).
