= Siege of Abu al-Duhur Airbase =

Syrian Civil War battle (2012-2015)

Coordinates: 35.7338°N 37.1039°E

- Part of the Syrian Civil War
- Map showing the siege
Date	23 September 2012 – 9 September 2015 (2 years, 11 months, 2 weeks and 3 days)
Location	Abu al-Duhur, Idlib Governorate, Syria
Result	Rebel victory: Rebels capture three villages and the airbase

Belligerents
Army of Conquest; Al-Nusra Front; Ahrar ash-Sham; Jund al-Aqsa; Ajnad ash-Sham; Turkistan Islamic Party in Syria; (Syria) Free Syrian Army (until late 2014)	(Ba'athist Syria) Syrian Arab Republic; Syrian Armed Forces; National Defense Force

Commanders and leaders
(Syrian opposition) Jamal Maarouf (Syrian Revolutionaries Front; until late 2014); Mohammed Khair Hassan Shuaib (Al-Nusra Front)	(Ba'athist Syria) Brig. Gen. Ihsan al-Zuhouri † (Abu al-Duhur commander) (Ba'athist Syria) Abu Al-Jarrah (Ba'athist Syria) Colonel Hussein Al-Yousif † (Syrian Arab Air Force 678 Squadron division commander) (Ba'athist Syria) Lieutenant Mohammad Khadour † (Syrian Air Force officer) (Ba'athist Syria) Lieutenant Saarem Mahfoud † (Syrian Air Force officer)

Units involved
(Syria) Syrian Martyrs' Brigade (until late 2014); Katibat Saifullah (كتيبة سيف الله)	(Ba'athist Syria) 11th Armored Division (Ba'athist Syria) Liwaa Suqour Al-Daher (Ba'athist Syria) 678 Squadron

Strength
1,000+ fighters	250–700 soldiers

Casualties and losses
Dozens killed (final assault)	56+ killed 71 captured (all executed); 40+ missing One Antonov An-26 crashed

The siege of Abu al-Duhur Airbase was a battle for the Abu al-Duhur Military Airbase in the Idlib Governorate during the Syrian civil war. It was captured by the rebel and jihadist forces on 9 September 2015. The base had been besieged since September 2012.

== The siege ==
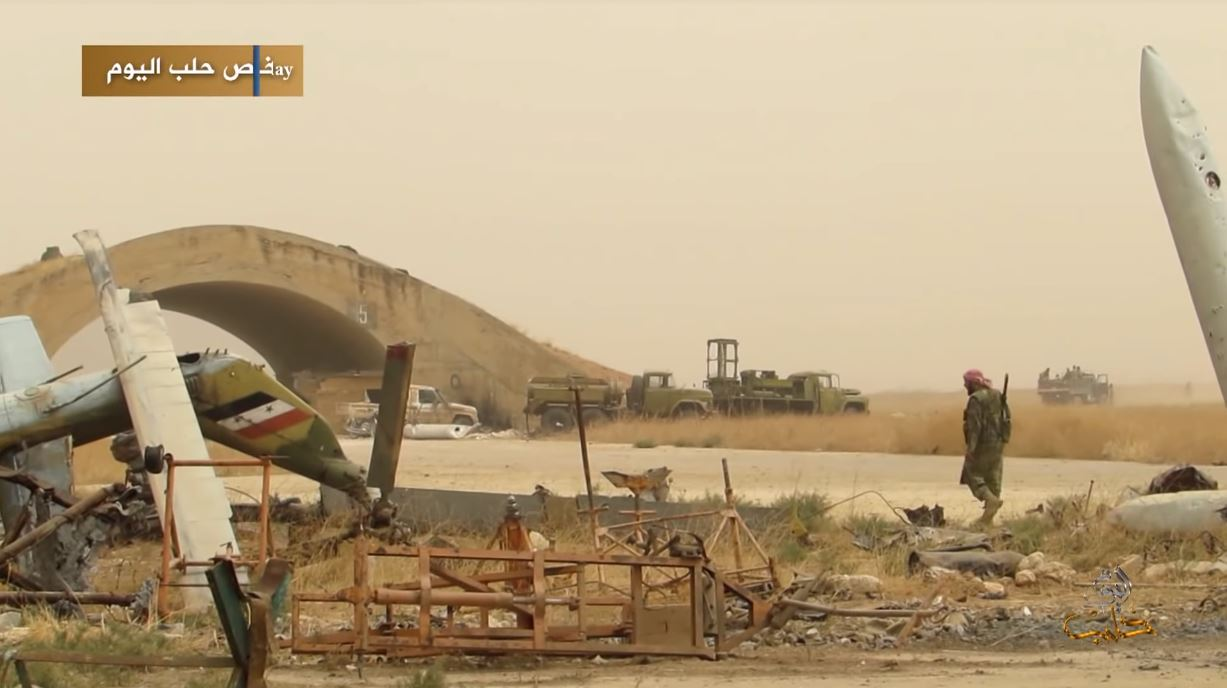
Airstrip at the base, littered with destroyed military equipment after the battle

On 22 September 2012, rebels from the Free Syrian Army carried out a coordinated attack involving 3 rebel battalions on the airbase at Abu al-Duhur, and then preventing Syrian Army reinforcements from reaching the base. They also claimed to have shot down a fighter jet during the attack, though this was not independently confirmed. By September 2012, the Syrian Air Force base was partially besieged by rebel fighters. The rebels, led by prominent commander Jamal Maarouf, established positions on the base's western edge, from where they were able to fire on the base's runways. The base was reported to have been rendered effectively unusable as a result, with planes no longer able to fly to or from it. By this time, supplies for the troops were airdropped by helicopters that flew in from airbases in Hama. The rebels also upped their attacks on the airbase. They claimed that as a result of their employment of anti-aircraft weaponry, they had rendered flights from the base inoperable. In August and September 2012, two MiG-21 and one MiG-23 jet fighters were reportedly downed above the airbase, including one reportedly shot down by Maarouf himself.

In 2013, the al-Khashir checkpoint (north east of the airport) was destroyed and burned by the rebels. However, the army kept control of the village. The base itself was also unsuccessfully stormed by the FSA on 30 April 2013, which temporally seized the western part of the base.

In the early morning hours of 27 November 2014, heavily armed army units moved from the Abu Duhur airbase under cover of artillery and air fire and captured Haymat ad Dayir and Mustarihah villages north of the airbase, before retreating back to the airbase.

After the capture of the Wadi Deif and Hamadiyah bases, the rebels turned their attention to the Abu al-Duhur airbase. They gathered about 1,000 fighters around the airport that was defended by about 700 soldiers. On 15 January 2015, the rebels launched an offensive on the village of Tal Salmo that was geared at opening a new front south of the Abu al-Duhur Military Airbase. The rebels attacked 2 points controlled by the army's 11th Tank Division and the National Defense Forces (NDF) at Tal Salmo. The assault on the 2 axes was foiled by the loyalist forces after almost 2 days of non-stop fighting with the militant groups. The following day, the rebels pounded the village of Tal Salmo with a barrage of mortar shells in order to weaken the army fortifications. After that, the militants stormed the army defenses at Tal Salmo, attempting to breach the latter's frontlines from the western perimeter of the village. The rebels were unsuccessful in their infiltration attempt, as the army fought off the assault, resulting in their complete control of the checkpoints adjacent to the village. 10 days later, it was reported that the rebels were in control of Tal Salmo. The village has strategic importance because it is close to the main gate of the airport and because it contains water wells that the troops in the airport consume via canalization. A week later, violent clashes took place at the main gate of the airport.

On 18 January 2015, an Antonov An-26 operated by the Syrian Air Force crashed while attempting to land at the besieged Abu al-Duhur military airport. There were 35 people on board, 30 Syrian soldiers and 5 Iranian military experts. Syrian media and the pro-opposition SOHR said that the crash was due to heavy fog or "technical issues". However, the Al-Qaeda affiliated group Al-Nusra Front claimed that they shot it down. Syrian media provided a list with the names of the 30 Syrian soldiers who were killed. Per SOHR, 13 Syrian officers were among the fatalities.

On 23 January 2015, the rebels managed to control al-Hamidiyeh village on the East side of the Abu al-Duhur airbase. However they pulled out to the outskirts later. On 25 January 2015, an Al Jazeera journalist from inside the village reported that the rebels were in control of al-Hamidiyeh.

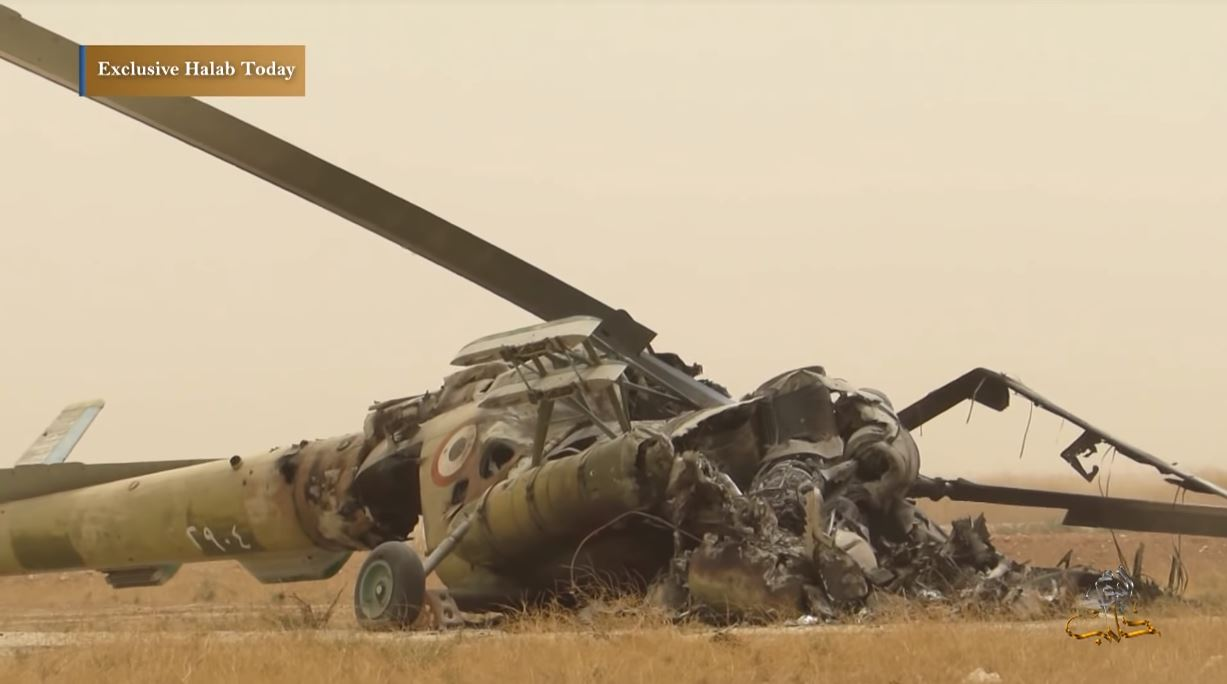
Helicopter left destroyed at Abu al-Duhur Military Airbase following the battle

On 17 February 2015, the al-Nusra Front reportedly shot down a helicopter above the airbase.

On 26 August 2015, the rebels launched an assault on the airbase attempting to bypass the Army's frontline defenses from two axes before they were repelled. The rebels began their assault by sending two suicide bombers with their VBIED toward the base's western gates; however, the two militants were unsuccessful in reaching their destination, as the guards destroyed the enemy vehicles. Following their unsuccessful suicide attacks, the militants stormed the western axis of the Airport, where they attempted to bypass the fortifications at the main gate of the base. Then the rebels stormed the eastern gates of the base from their positions at the village of al-Khashir. The clashes continued until the army repelled the attackers.

On 7 September 2015, the rebels launched another assault on the airbase under the cover of a heavy sandstorm after at least one al-Nusra fighter blew himself up inside the base. That day, the rebels captured Tabarat al-Khashit and its hill on the outskirts, forcing the government fighters to retreat towards the eastern gate. The next day, the rebels advanced inside the airbase and captured the eastern part. The rebels began posting pictures of them standing inside the base on social media not long after.

On 9 September, the rebels captured the entire airbase. The fall of the base was initiated after the Army withdrew to the outskirts. Syrian state TV conceded that government troops had "evacuated their positions and moved to another point". According to the SOHR, at least 56 soldiers were killed and 40 captured, while dozens of others are still missing. Dozens of rebels were also killed during the battle. The airbase commander, Brig. Gen. Ihsan al-Zuhouri, was among the government casualties.

As of 10 September, 18 soldiers were known to have escaped the airbase, while the rest were either killed, captured or missing according to government sources.

== Aftermath ==
On 18 September, 56 soldiers were executed by the al-Nusra Front and the Turkistan Islamic Party in Syria, bring the total number of executed soldiers in the airbase to 71. A total of 63 soldiers reached government-held areas, while over 40 soldiers were still missing.

During the siege, the Turkistan Islamic Party and al-Nusra were accompanied by Abdallah al-Muhaysini. The Syrian government recaptured the airbase on 21 January 2018.
