= Mohammed Khair Hassan Shuaib =

Syrian general (born 1977)

Major General Mohammed Khair Hassan Shuaib
- محمد خير حسن شعيب

Deputy Minister of Defense
- Incumbent
- Assumed office 1 June 2025
- President: Ahmed al-Sharaa
- Minister: Murhaf Abu Qasra

Personal details
- Born: 1977 (age 48–49) Taftanaz, Idlib Governorate, Syria
- Nickname(s): Abu al-Khair Taftanaz (Arabic: أبو الخير تفتناز)

Military service
- Allegiance: Syria (since 2024); Formerly: Al-Nusra Front (2012–2016); Jabhat Fateh al-Sham (2016–2017); Hay'at Tahrir al-Sham (2017–2025); Syrian Salvation Government (2017–2024)
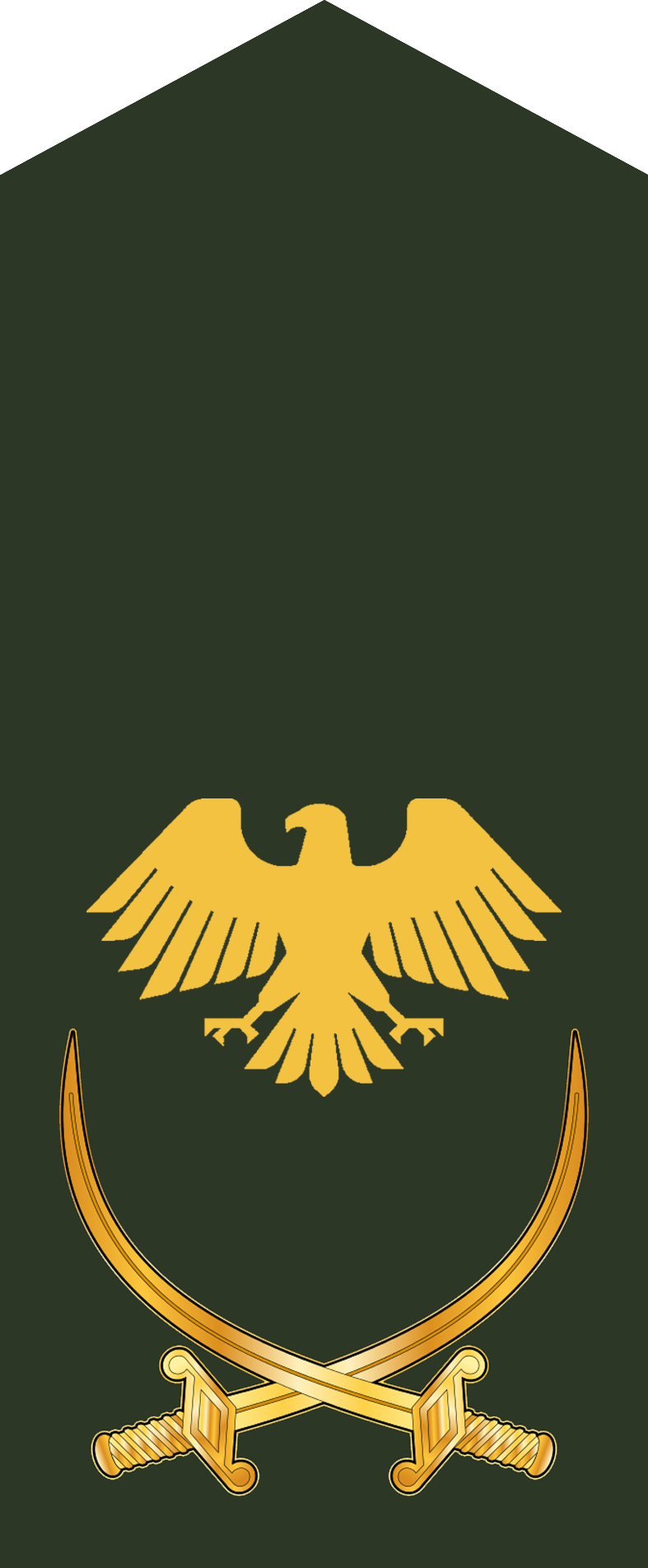
- Rank: Major general
- Commands: Abu Bakr al-Siddiq Army (2013–2020)
- Battles/wars: Syrian Civil War; Idlib Governorate clashes (June 2012 – April 2013); Battle of Idlib (2015); Siege of Abu al-Duhur Airbase; Battle of Aleppo (2012–2016); 2016 Southern Aleppo campaign; Aleppo offensive (October–November 2016); 2024 Syrian opposition offensives; Battle of Aleppo (2024); 2024 Hama offensive; 2024 Homs offensive; Fall of Damascus (2024)

Mohammed Khair Hassan Shuaib (Arabic: محمد خير حسن شعيب) is a Syrian military officer currently serving as Deputy Minister of Defense.

== Early life and education ==
He was born in Taftanaz, Idlib Governorate, in 1977.

== Role during the Syrian civil war ==
Shuaib joined the Al-Nusra Front upon its formation in 2012 and played a notable leadership role in the faction's military campaigns against the Syrian government, such as in the capture of Taftanaz Air Base in January 2013 and the Battle of Idlib in March 2015. He also led opposition fighters during the siege of Abu al-Duhur Airbase in September 2015, the capture of Al-Eiss, and in an offensive intended on lifting the siege of Aleppo during the Battle of Aleppo from 28 October 2016.

He served as commander-in-chief of the Abu Bakr al-Siddiq Army, a faction within Hay'at Tahrir al-Sham (HTS), since its formation in 2013 until its incorporation into the Military Operations Command by 2020.

In 2021, he was appointed to lead a military council consisting of factions such as HTS or the National Front for Liberation for the Idlib Military College, and he also contributed to the military college's establishment that same year.

From 2019 to 2024, he served as commander of the Central Operations Room in Idlib, affiliated with the Military Operations Command, and played a prominent role in planning the Operation Deterrence of Aggression offensive, which resulted in the fall of the Assad regime in December 2024, leading opposition offensives in Aleppo, Hama, Homs, and Damascus.

== Post-Assad ==
On 29 December 2024, following the fall of the Assad regime, Suhaib was appointed Brigadier General.

On 1 June 2025, Syrian President Ahmed al-Sharaa issued Presidential Decree No. 47 of 2025, promoting Shuaib to the rank of Major General and appointing him as Deputy Minister of Defense.
