= Siege of Wadi Deif (2014) =

Siege of two Syrian Army bases

Coordinates: 35.6437°N 36.6998°E

- Part of Syrian Civil War
- Maarrat al-Nu'man and the strategic M5 highway, the main Army supply route from Hama and Damascus to Aleppo.
Date	4 April – 15 December 2014 (8 months, 1 week and 4 days)
Location	Maarrat al-Nu'man, Syria
Result	Rebel victory: Al-Nusra Front and allies capture the Wadi Deif and Hamadiyah bases, a string of villages and 14 checkpoints around the two bases; Al-Nusra Front and allies claimed captures 35 tanks and 20 armored personnel carriers from the Syrian Arab Army; The Army retreats to Murak

Belligerents
Free Syrian Army; Islamic Front; Sham Legion; Al-Nusra Front	(Syria) Syrian Arab Republic: Syrian Arab Armed Forces; National Defense Force

Commanders and leaders
Abu Ammar Al-Jazraawi †	Brig. Gen. Shama'oun Suleiman

Units involved
Free Syrian Army; Syrian Revolutionaries Front; Liwa al-Maghawir; 13th Division; Knights of Justice Brigade; Islamic Front; Ahrar ash-Sham; Suqour al-Sham Brigade	11th Armored Division

Strength
3,000-3,300 fighters (December 2014)	1,500 soldiers and militiamen 50+ military vehicles

Casualties and losses
80 killed (final assault)	110 killed and 120–200 captured in final assault (Rebel claim); 35 tanks and 20 APC's captured in final assault (Rebel claim)

The siege of Wadi Deif was a siege of two Syrian Army bases, Wadi Deif and Hamadiyah (both just outside Maarrat al-Numan), by rebel forces, during the 2014 Idlib offensive of the Syrian Civil War. The first siege of these two bases was broken by the Syrian Army on 18 April 2013. During the siege, rebels detonated several 'tunnel bombs' underneath army positions surrounding the bases, which was similar to the tactics used during the First World War.

== Background ==
On 5 March 2014, rebels launched an offensive in Idlib Governorate to lift the siege of Khan Shaykhun and cut the supply lines to the Wadi Deif and Hamadiyah army bases. On 23 March, rebels advanced towards Khan Shaykhun resulted in both the lifting of the siege of the town and cutting the supply line to Syrian Army bases further north in the province. On 4 April, rebels cut off the second supply line to these two bases by capturing Aboulin town and al-Salhiya village.

== Siege ==
Map showing the siege

On 15 April, six rebels were killed while no less than 40 were injured, and contact was lost with 25 rebels after an ambush by Syrian Army units around Hamadiyah base.

On 14 May, rebels detonated a tunnel bomb underneath the Wadi Deif military base, destroying the western entrance of the base completely. According to opposition sources and SOHR, rebels killed between 35 and 100 Syrian soldiers due to the explosion. Rebel progression in Idlib continued in early July focusing on the area surrounding the Hamadiyah base. Immediately west of the Army base were four checkpoints: Hanajak, Tafar, Dahman and al-Midajin which form an arc, insulating Hamadiyah from the west to the north.

On 7 July, rebels raided the Taraf checkpoint southwest of Hamadiyah as part of an operation entitled "The Battle of One Army." After targeting a number of military tanks with TOW missiles, rebels stormed the checkpoint and seized a number of T-55 tanks. The checkpoint was used by the rebels as a staging point to continue their offensive northwest toward the Dahman checkpoint, before being completely demolished to prevent the Army from reoccupying it. Rebels also advanced 600 meters north towards the Dahman checkpoint located northwest of Hamadiyah and captured it on 9 July. After capturing the checkpoint and a quantity of supplies inside, rebels destroyed it, again in an attempt to prevent government forces from reoccupying the position. On 16 July, rebels attacked the al-Midajin checkpoint located north of Hamadiyah and the smaller, Hanajak checkpoint located immediately west of the base. Hanajak fell to rebels with little resistance. Clashes continued between rebels and soldiers as rebels attempted to continue their advance towards the base.

On 15 October, rebels detonated three tunnel-bombs under Hamadiyah and al-Dahrouj checkpoint. Opposition activists claimed that at least 35 pro-government fighters were killed in the blasts. The rebels were able to capture the Gerbal Abo Ya'rob checkpoint that day. Two rebels and at least five soldiers were killed in the clashes.

On 14 December, approximately 3,000 jihadist rebels (mainly al-Nusra and Ahrar ash-Sham) launched an offensive on the two bases and captured seven checkpoints on the first day. Early the next morning, the al-Nusra Front, supported by Jund al-Aqsa and other Islamic fighters, captured the Wadi Deif base and three checkpoints in addition to two tanks. According to the SOHR, al-Nusra used U.S.-made BGM-71 TOW missiles, tanks and other heavy weaponry taken from the U.S. backed Syria Revolutionaries Front in the assault. Later that day, rebels of the Ahrar ash-Sham also captured the Hamadiyah base and the Tell Bansara and al-Naseh areas, forcing the Army to retreat from Hamadiyah to the villages of Basidah and Ma'ar Hattat. A helicopter carrying Army officers took off from Hamadiyah base before it was captured. At the end of the day, rebels captured Basidah after the Army retreated towards Ma'er Hattat. Eventually, the Army also abandoned Ma'er Hattat and retreated towards the town of Murak through rebel-held territory. Some vehicles were reportedly hit by ambushes along the road, while dozens of soldiers managed to reach Murak in 10 vehicles. The Syrian Air Force conducted 42 airstrikes during the day.

The fighting left over 100 soldiers and at least 80 rebels dead. According to al-Nusra, another 120–200 soldiers were captured. A military source stated the Islamic Front's leader of field operations Abu Ammar Al-Jazraawi was killed at Wadi Deif. According to the SOHR, the rebels found 2 million liters of fuel in the two captured bases.

== Aftermath ==
On 17 December, 10 soldiers (including an officer), who were trying to reach Murak, were reportedly killed by an ambush by rebels near the town. Also, the remains of seven rebels killed in 2012 were found at the al-Dab'an checkpoint.

== Strategical importance ==
The Army-held enclave, which stretched from the two bases to the town of Hish in the south of Idlib province, was strategically located as it blocked rebel movements between the north and the south, and the coast and the east. The fall of these two bases paved the way for Jabhat al-Nusra and other jihadist groups to advance toward the besieged Abu al-Duhur Military Airbase and the city of Idlib.

== See also ==
- First siege of Wadi Deif
