= Idlib Military Council =

Revolutionary Military Council in Idlib Governorate
- Arabic: المجلس العسكري الثوري في محافظة ادلب
- Leader: Col. Afif Suleiman
- Dates active: April 2012 – 14 June 2014
- Headquarters: Kafr Nabl
- Active regions: Idlib Governorate
- Part of: Free Syrian Army: Syrian Revolutionaries Front (since December 2013) (2013—14)
- Wars: the Syrian civil war

The Revolutionary Military Council in Idlib Governorate (Arabic: المجلس العسكري الثوري في محافظة ادلب) was a Syrian rebel military council affiliated with the Free Syrian Army and was headed by Colonel Afif Suleiman. The group was active in the Idlib Governorate.

== History ==
Defected Syrian Air Force Colonel Afif Suleiman formed the Northern Shield Battalion in February 2012. In April 2012, Suleiman formed the Idlib Military Council. In late May 2012, the military council and its affiliated rebel groups, including the Syrian Martyrs' Brigade (then called the Martyrs of Mount Zawiya Battalion), terminated the Kofi Annan Syrian peace plan and began to launch attacks against Syrian Army positions near Idlib, in coordination with the allied Suqour al-Sham Brigade.

In December 2013, it issued a statement against the Islamic State of Iraq and the Levant to release all of its captured FSA officers, including Lieutenant Colonel Ahmed al-Saud of the 13th Division and Fares Bayoush of the Knights of Justice Brigade and their fighters.

The council joined the Syrian Revolutionaries Front on 9 December 2013.

On 14 June 2014, the commander of the Idlib Military Council, Col. Afif Suleiman, along with 8 other FSA military council commanders, all colonels or lieutenant colonels, resigned due to the lack of funding.

== See also ==
- List of armed groups in the Syrian Civil War
- Damascus Military Council
- Daraa Military Council
- Quneitra Military Council
