= Battle of Taftanaz =

2012 battle during the Syrian civil war

Coordinates: 35.9969°N 36.7866°E

- Part of April 2012 Idlib Governorate Operation (the early insurgency phase of the Syrian civil war)
Date	11 February – 5 April 2012 (1 month, 3 weeks and 4 days)
Location	Taftanaz, Idlib Governorate, Syria
Result	Syrian Army victory

Belligerents
Free Syrian Army; Suqour al-Sham; Liwa Dawud	(Syria) Syrian Arab Republic: Syrian Army

Commanders and leaders
Hassan Aboud; Abu Ali Bard	Unknown

Strength
Unknown	1st Armoured Division: 76th Armoured Brigade; 300 soldiers, 50 tanks

Casualties and losses
Unknown	9 tanks
- 120 killed in total (opposition claim)
- Location within Syria

The Battle of Taftanaz started on February 11, 2012, in Idlib Governorate, between anti-government fighters and Syrian Arab Army troops participating in a nationwide crackdown on dissent against Bashar al-Assad's government. Heavy fighting took place on the outskirts of the town of Taftanaz, killing 20 people. On the day of the battle Kofi Annan announced a cease-fire for the Syrian conflict.

By 5 April, the military captured Taftanaz's city center, which was defended by 200 armed rebels, after a two-hour battle, following which the army reportedly rounded up and executed 82 people. It was unknown how many were opposition fighters and how many were civilians.

Two months after, it was called a "massacre" in the town of Taftanaz, two-thirds of the population had left. The town had been a centre for opposition protests until the army had raided it with tanks on 3 April. Witnesses in the town said that tanks shelled the town from four sides before armored cars brought in dozens of soldiers who dragged civilians from their homes and gunned them down in the streets, and they also claimed that the soldiers looted, destroyed and torched hundreds of homes, bringing some down on their owners' heads. Videos showed this, and 62 people were killed during the attack, despite the town only having a small rebel presence. Nine Syrian Arab Army tanks were destroyed by homemade bombs as they left the town.
