= Saudi involvement in the Syrian civil war =

Saudi involvement in the Syrian civil war involved the large-scale supply of weapons and ammunition to various rebel groups in Syria during the Syrian Civil War.

Since the summer of 2013, Saudi Arabia has emerged as the main group to finance and arm the rebels. Saudi Arabia has financed a large purchase of infantry weapons from Croatia via shipments shuttled through Jordan.The weapons began reaching rebels in December 2012 which allowed rebels' small tactical gains against the Syrian army.

Saudi Arabia has backed Islamist rebel groups including the Army of Conquest.

In August 2017, the Syrian opposition was informed by the Saudi foreign minister that the Kingdom was disengaging from them. Subsequently, Saudi Arabia took a more conciliatory stance towards the Ba'athist Syrian government.

== Croatian weapons ==
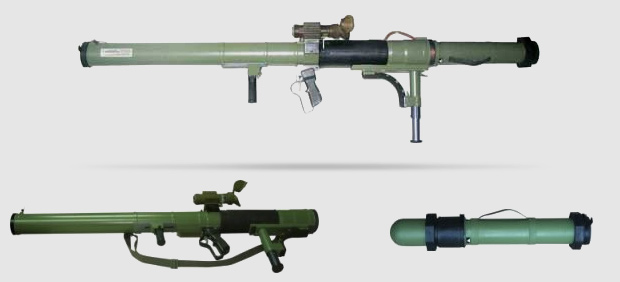
M79 Osa anti-tank weapon purchased by Saudi Arabia from Croatia for use in the Syrian Civil War

In December 2012, a new wave of weapons from foreign supporters were transferred to rebel forces via the Jordanian border in the country's south. The arms included M79 Osa anti-tank weapons and Yugoslav-made M-60 recoilless rifles purchased by Saudi Arabia from Croatia. Previously, most of the weapons were delivered via the Turkish border in the north. The goal for the change in routes was to strengthen moderate rebels and to support their push towards Damascus. This shipment was also said to be to counter shipments of weapons from Iran to aid the Syrian government.

== Timber Sycamore ==
Saudi Arabia was involved in the CIA–led Timber Sycamore covert operation to train and arm Syrian rebels. A classified US State Department cable signed by Secretary of State Hillary Clinton reported that Saudi donors were a major support for Sunni militant forces globally, and some American officials worried that Syrian rebels being supported had ties to Al Qaeda.

== Bandar bin Sultan ==
In August 2013 the Wall Street Journal reported that Saudi Prince Bandar bin Sultan had been appointed to lead Saudi Arabia's efforts to topple Syrian president Bashar al-Assad, and that the US Central Intelligence Agency considered this a sign of how serious Saudi Arabia was about this aim. Bandar was described as "jetting from covert command centers near the Syrian front lines to the Élysée Palace in Paris and the Kremlin in Moscow, seeking to undermine the Assad regime." After tensions with Qatar over supplying rebel groups, Saudi Arabia switched its efforts from Turkey to Jordan in 2012, using its financial leverage over Jordan to develop training facilities there, overseen by Bandar's half-brother Salman bin Sultan. In late 2012 Saudi intelligence also began efforts to convince the US that the Assad government was using chemical weapons. The Assyrian International News Agency reported that Saudi government also would be sending prisoners sentenced to death to fight in Syria.

According to an opinion piece by journalist Patrick Cockburn, former head of MI6, Richard Dearlove revealed he was told Bandar's intentions, claiming the Prince had told him "The time is not far off in the Middle East, Richard, when it will be literally 'God help the Shia'. More than a billion Sunnis have simply had enough of them." Dearlove has expressed his view that "Saudi Arabia is involved in the ISIS-led Sunni rebellion".

== Support for rebel factions ==
=== Jaysh al-Islam ===
Jaysh al-Islam is an Islamist rebel alliance based in the eastern suburbs of Damascus, led by Zahran Alloush, the son of Saudi-based religious scholar Abdullah Mohammed Alloush. Its creation was said to have been negotiated and spearheaded by Saudi Arabia, who believed that al-Nusra Front was gaining too much strength. After the alliance was formed in September 2013, The Guardian reported that Saudi Arabia was preparing to give the group millions of dollars to "arm and train" its fighters, and use instructors from Pakistan to help train the group.

=== Free Syrian Army ===
The Southern Front, a large, moderate Free Syrian Army-affiliated rebel alliance based in southern Syria between early 2014 and mid-2018 has been reported to have Saudi backing. Another moderate FSA faction financially supported by Saudi Arabia was the Syrian Revolutionaries Front, active from late 2013. One unit reported to have Saudi backing was the Syrian Martyrs' Brigades.

=== Nour al-Din al-Zenki Movement ===
The Nour al-Din al-Zenki Movement is an Islamist rebel faction formed in late 2011 that has gone through many affiliations. It was part of the Saudi-backed Authenticity and Development Front in 2013–14, which was considered to be moderate by Charles Lister (from Middle East Institute) and the BBC.

In January 2014, Nour al-Din al-Zenki was one of the founding factions in the anti-ISIL umbrella group Army of Mujahideen. In May 2014 it withdrew from the alliance and subsequently received increased financial support from Saudi Arabia, which had been reluctant to support the Army of Mujahideen due to its links with the Syrian Muslim Brotherhood.

On 9 May 2016, a plan was reportedly proposed by the US, Turkey, Saudi Arabia, and Qatar to have the Nour al-Din al-Zenki Movement form a "Northern Army". However, the plan was delayed due to doubts from U.S. officials about the capabilities of the Syrian rebel forces that Turkey had recruited to fight with its military, the opposition from the US-backed Syrian Democratic Forces, and the rift between Turkey and Russia that had only been mended in early August 2016.

=== Army of Conquest ===
In 2015, Saudi Arabia, Turkey and Qatar received criticism from Western media for backing rebels associated with the Army of Conquest, which includes the al-Nusra front, an al-Qaeda affiliated group.

== November 2015 escalation ==
Following the Russian military intervention in the Syrian Civil War, Saudi Arabia heavily increased its support and supply of arms such as anti-tank weapons in order to assist rebels in countering major new government offensives backed by Russian air support.

== Silk Airlines weapons transfers ==
In July 2017, an investigation by Dilyana Gaytandzhieva in Bulgarian daily newspaper Trud found that Azerbaijani state-owned Silk Way Airlines exploited a loophole in the international aviation and transport regulations to offer flights to arms manufacturers and private companies in 2016–17, with much of the cargo heading for Syria, and some ending up in the hands of ISIL and Kurdish fighters. The published documents included correspondence between the Bulgarian Ministry of Foreign Affairs and the Embassy of Azerbaijan to Bulgaria with attached documents for weapons deals and diplomatic clearance for overflight and/or landing in Bulgaria and other countries, including Saudi Arabia. The documents disclosed that American weapons manufacturers had shipped over $1 billion of weapons through Silk Way Airlines, corporate subcontractors included ″Purple Shovel LLC″ based in Sterling, Virginia, US Department of Defense subcontracting vehicle ″Culmen International LLC″ based in Alexandria, weapons and defense procurement firm ″Chemring Military Products″ based in Perry, Florida. When Silk Way Airlines did not have enough available planes, Azerbaijan's Air Force jets would transport the military shipments. In the investigation the reporter accused responsible authorities of many countries (Israel, Bulgaria, Serbia, Romania, the Czech Republic, Hungary, Slovakia, Poland, Turkey, as well as to the militaries of Saudi Arabia, UAE, the military forces of Germany and Denmark in Afghanistan and of Sweden in Iraq, and the US Special Operations Command (USSOCOM)) to "have turned a blind eye and allowed diplomatic flights for the transport of tons of weapons, carried out by civil aircrafts [sic] for military needs."

== Syrian Democratic Forces ==
As of early 2018 after the election of US President Donald Trump and other opposition groups losing ground, Saudi Arabia began talks with Arab factions in the Syrian Democratic Forces. The Kingdom also coordinated with the United States in its support for SDF after US President Trump suggested an end to American military presence in Syria, to be replaced with an Arab force made up of Saudi Arabia, Qatar, the United Arab Emirates and Egypt. However Egypt rejected the idea, since reaching out to Arab affiliated SDF groups Saudi Arabia has set up recruitment centers offering new recruits the equivalent of $200, Saudi Arabia has also set up two communications checkpoints in Qamshili and Hasakah.

== Groups known to have receive Saudi support ==
- 13th Division (Syrian rebel group)
- Nour al-Din al-Zenki Movement
- Authenticity and Development Front
- Jaysh al-Islam
- Conquest Brigade
- Southern Front
- Syrian Revolutionaries Front
- Syrian Martyrs' Brigades
- Revolutionary Commando Army
- Free Idlib Army
- Army of Conquest
