= 2026 Abu al-Duhur Air Base airstrikes =

August 2026 Israeli air strikes on a military airbase in Idlib Governorate, Syria

- Part of Israel–Turkey tensions and Israeli invasion of Syria (2024–present)
- Date: 18 August 2026
- Location: Abu al-Duhur Air Base, Idlib Governorate, Syria
- Caused by: Israeli concern over Turkish military presence at the base and Syrian efforts to rebuild its air force
- Goals: Prevent Turkish troop deployment at the base and deter Syrian air force reconstitution
- Methods: Airstrikes on runway and storage facilities

Parties
Israel	Syria Turkey

Casualties and losses
- No casualties reported; damage to runway and storage facilities

On 18 August 2026, the Israel Defense Forces carried out a series of air strikes carried out against the Abu al-Duhur Air Base in eastern Idlib Governorate, northwestern Syria. Syrian state television reported eight air strikes hit the base's runway and storage facilities, causing material damage but no casualties.

== Background ==
The Abu al-Duhur base, about 70 kilometres from the Turkish border, had been out of service as a dedicated military airfield since 2013 and changed hands repeatedly during the Syrian civil war. Since the fall of Bashar al-Assad in December 2024, the base had been used as a training centre for Syria's new army. Israeli officials had reportedly detected signs that Syria was accelerating efforts to rebuild its air force, including pilot recruitment, flight training, and an exercise using Russian-made MiG-21 fighter jets in early August 2026, the first such exercise since Assad's ouster. The strikes also followed a visit to the site by a Turkish military delegation days earlier.

== Strikes ==
Syria's state broadcaster Al-Ekhbariya reported that Israeli aircraft targeted the runway and storage facilities at Abu al-Duhur with eight strikes overnight on 18 August 2026. Israel initially declined to comment but claimed responsibility later in the day. The Israeli prime minister's office said Israel and Syria had "agreed to a status quo" on security matters that Syria was "on the verge of breaching" by allowing Turkish troops to deploy at the airbase, adding that Syria had ignored repeated warnings on the matter. A Turkish source told Axios that Turkey had no military presence at the base, and accused Israel of "inventing pretexts to bomb neighbouring countries and destabilize the region".

== Reactions ==
=== Syria ===
Syria's Ministry of Foreign Affairs and Expatriates condemned the strikes as an "unjustified act of aggression, a flagrant violation of Syria's sovereignty and territorial integrity, and a dangerous escalation that threatens security and stability in the region," and said it would continue to defend its rights by legitimate means under international law.

=== Jordan ===
Jordan's Ministry of Foreign Affairs and Expatriates also condemned the strikes, calling them "an unjustified act of aggression... and a blatant breach of international law and the UN Charter," and urged the international community to compel Israel to halt its attacks on Syria and end its occupation of Syrian territory.

=== Turkey ===
Turkey condemned the strikes as a violation of international law and called on the international community to hold Israel accountable. Turkish foreign minister Hakan Fidan said Israel's attacks on Syria were among the greatest destabilizing factors for the country's stability.

=== United States ===
US Ambassador to Turkey and Special Envoy for Syria Tom Barrack condemned the strike as an "unnecessary escalation," saying the government of Ahmed al-Sharaa had "neither adopted a predatory posture nor maintained proxy forces," and urged all parties to "prioritise logical discourse over further military incidents". Barrack later said the strike carried "a real risk of rapid escalation into a direct military confrontation between Israel and Turkey as well as Syria," noting Turkish forces had not been informed the Israeli aircraft were en route, and that Washington was engaged in discussions to relaunch a deconfliction cell between Israel and Syria.

== Analysis ==
Analysts told Al Jazeera the strike was intended as a message to both Damascus and Ankara against rebuilding Syria's air force and expanding Turkish influence in the country, drawing a comparison to Israeli strikes on Syrian airbases in March 2025 that had also followed visits by Turkish military teams. Israeli officials cited the strikes as part of its efforts to deter use of the base by Turkey and that "Syria chose to ignore" the message that this should not be allowed. The New York Times cited experts stating that the Israeli strikes were prompted by concerns that Turkish air defense systems could be installed at the base and used to prevent Israel from using Syrian airspace as a route for its aircraft to strike Iran.

== See also ==
- Abu al-Duhur Air Base
- Israel and the Syrian civil war
- Fall of Damascus (2024)
- Syria–Turkey relations
