= Saraya al-Areen =

Militant organization in Syria

- سرايا العرين
- Other name: Fawj Abu al-Harith and Brigades of the Den
- Leaders: "Abu al-Harith" Yisar al-Assad (2015–2024); Hashem Abu Shuaib (2024–present)
- Dates active: 2015–present
- Allegiance: Ba'athist Syria (2015–2024); Islamic Resistance Front in Syria (2025–present)
- Active regions: Latakia Governorate; Suwayda Governorate
- Ideology: Assadism
- Wars: Syrian civil war; 2016 Southern Aleppo campaign; 2016 Latakia offensive; Syrian Desert campaign (May–July 2017); Central Syria campaign; Syrian conflict (2024–present); Israeli invasion of Syria

Saraya al-Areen (Arabic: سرايا العرين, lit. 'Brigades of the Den') is a Syrian Assadist militant organization in Latakia, Syria.

== History ==
It was founded in 2015, led by Yisar al-Assad nicknamed "Abu al-Harith", although they claim to have been fighting since the beginning of the Syrian civil war, their operations are to expel the rebel forces from the north of the Latakia Governorate, during 2016 Latakia offensive, the group also brought fighters to fight in Aleppo during 2016 Southern Aleppo campaign. The group owns warehouses in Qardaha where they collect used furniture looted in battles in rural Latakia and work as intermediaries between the families of detainees and Ba'athist Syria.

The group together with Syrian Arab Armed Forces, National Defence Forces, Kata'ib al-Imam Ali and Hezbollah expelled the Syrian Free Army from Suwayda Governorate, in the Syrian Desert campaign (May–July 2017).

According to their Facebook page, the group participated in the Central Syria campaign.

In 2018, the Ba'athist Syria told the group that "Qardaha sends you a thank you card," adding, "It's enough that you protected the city of Qardaha and that no car bombs entered it".

In 2020, the group began recruiting militants in the south, specifically Saida, Dael and Izraa, for Iranian militias and Hezbollah, subjecting them to training courses in the Al-Lajat area.

Following the Fall of Assad, the group swore allegiance to the Islamic Resistance Front in Syria in 2025, now commanded by Abu Shuaib. Furthermore, together with the Syrian Popular Resistance, they made a joint appeal to all resistance factions and immediately establish the "Unified Military Council of the Syrian Resistance". Their forces are now concentrated in the south, against Israel in their invasion of Syria.
