= Junud al-Makhdi =

Active jihadist group

Katibat Junud al-Makhdi
- كتيبة جنود المهدی
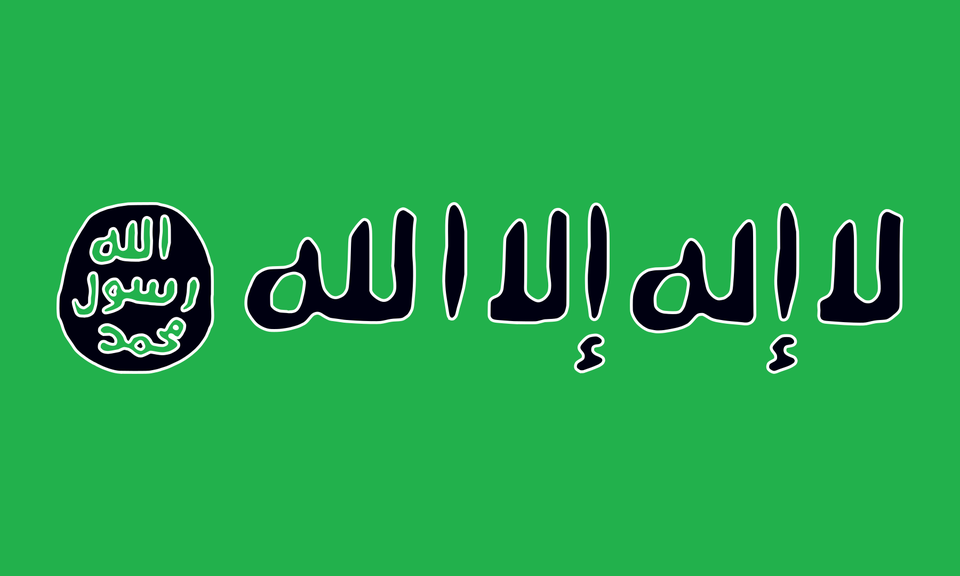
- Flag of Junud al-Makhdi
- Leader: Salahuddin al-Tatari
- Dates active: July 2016 - 2017?
- Groups: Jamaat Bulgar; Jaish al-Shomal al-Islami
- Headquarters: Latakia Governorate, Syria
- Active regions: Latakia Governorate, Syria
- Ideology: Jihadism; Separatism
- Size: 400
- Wars: Syrian Civil War

Katibat Junud al-Makhdi (commonly referred to as just Junud al-Makhdi) is a Syrian Civil War-era jihadist rebel group created by a merger of two smaller groups operating in Northern Syria, composed exclusively of Tatar and Bashkir fighters. The group's fighters hail mainly from Tatarstan and Bashkortostan as well as other areas in Russia with Tatar and Bashkir populations.

== History ==
The group was created by a merger of Jamaat Bulgar and Jaish al-Shomal al-Islam in mid-2016 (each made up of Tatar fighters from Russia). Jamaat Bulgar was initially founded in Afghanistan with its headquarters in Waziristan by an Avar from Dagestan and its fighters fought alongside the Taliban while not being formally part of it for 10 years and became involved in the Syrian Civil War during the beginning with several fighters arriving in 2012. The second group was founded in Syria to combat the Assad regime. The leader of Jaish al-Shomal al-Islam is the current leader of the Junud al-Makhdi.

The group cooperates with the Turkistan Islamic Party in Syria as well as local Syrian Turkmen Brigades in the Latakia Governorate because of linguistic similarities in the Turkic languages. The group also calls on Russian Muslims to join its ranks as well as wage war domestically, and claims to have members active in both Russia and Yemen.
