= 2014 raid on Idlib city =

Military attack in Syria

- Part of the Syrian Civil War
Date	27 October 2014
Location	Idlib Governorate, Syria
Result	Syrian Army victory: Rebels initially capture two buildings inside the city and Tell al-Mastouma; Syrian Army recaptures the buildings and Tell al-Mastouma; Rebels allegedly beheaded 70 soldiers and officers during the raid; Eruption of the al-Nusra Front–SRF/Hazzm Movement conflict

Belligerents
Al-Nusra Front; Jund al-Aqsa; Sleeper cells within Idlib; Supported by: Islamic State (alleged)	(Syria) Syrian Arab Republic: Syrian Armed Forces; National Defense Force

Commanders and leaders
Abu Waleed al-Libi † (local Nusra leader)	Mohamed Khair al-Sayyed (Governor of Idlib)

Strength
Hundreds	Unknown

Casualties and losses
35–70 killed	21 killed 70 captured & executed (rebel claim)
- 4 civilians killed

The 2014 raid on Idlib city refers to a military operation in the Idlib Governorate, during the Syrian Civil War, conducted by mainly Salafi jihadists backed by Islamist rebels against the Syrian Government.

== Rebel attack ==
Rebels from the al-Nusra Front launched an attack on Idlib city and al-Mastouma overnight in order to cut off the city from the south. During this attack, suicide cars were detonated at four Army checkpoints surrounding the city, killing "dozens" of soldiers, while rebels captured Tell al-Mastouma. The Army later recaptured the hill. According to the SOHR, 10 soldiers and nine rebels were killed on the hill. The rebels also managed to infiltrate the city and seized the governor mansion and the police headquarters with help from members of the local police and people’s committees. They took advantage of a power cut before dawn according to the Idlib police chief. These buildings were recaptured by pro-government forces later that day after the rebels pulled out of the city. It is believed that the rebels beheaded at least 70 soldiers (including army officers) in the two buildings they were holding, before pulling out. According to an opposition activist in the city, the rebels continue to hold the surrounding checkpoints that they took in morning.

According to the SOHR, at least 20 pro-government fighters, 15 rebels and four civilians were killed during the operation, while Al-Masdar placed the death toll at 21 government fighters (17 NDF and 4 Army) and 70 rebel fighters. Casualties among insurgents include a Jund al-Aqsa sleeper cell, which was discovered after the military intercepted rebel radio communications, and local rebel commanders. Al-Nusra Front claimed that it also had cut off the city, captured 12 soldiers and seized two tanks during the operation.
