= 2016 Southern Aleppo campaign =

Series of military operations

- Part of the Battle of Aleppo and the Syrian Civil War
Date	1 April – 18 June 2016 (2 months, 2 weeks and 3 days)
Location	Aleppo Governorate, Syria
Result	Rebel victory: The rebels capture Tel Al-Eis, Khan Tuman and seven other villages

Belligerents
Army of Conquest: Al-Nusra Front; Ahrar ash-Sham; Turkistan Islamic Party in Syria; Ajnad al-Sham; Sham Legion; Jund al-Aqsa; Caucasus Emirate (Syrian opposition) Free Syrian Army	Shia militias: Liwa Fatemiyoun; Harakat Hezbollah al-Nujaba; Badr Brigades; Hezbollah; Imam Mahdi Brigade; Baqir Brigade; Iran (Syria) Syrian Arab Republic; Russia; Liwa al-Quds (Syria) Saraya al-Areen

Commanders and leaders
Abu Abdollah Jabal † (al-Nusra top commander); Umar al-Daghestani † (al-Nusra commander); Seif al-Ansari † (al-Nusra commander); Abu Alaa Ta'oum † (Ahrar ash-Sham commander); Abu Aisha † (Jund al-Aqsa top commander)	(Iran) Brig. Gen. Javad Dourbin † (IRGC senior commander) (Iran) Brig. Gen. Shafi Shafii † (IRGC Quds Force senior commander)

Units involved
Fatah Halab: 13th Division; Knights of Justice Brigade	Syrian Armed Forces; Syrian Army; 4th Mechanized Division; 154th Brigade; National Defence Forces; (Iran) Iranian Armed Forces; IRGC; Quds Force; 25th Karbala Division; Iranian Army; 65th Airborne Special Forces Brigade; Russian Armed Forces; Russian Air Force

Casualties and losses
285 killed 1 tank destroyed 2 IFVs destroyed	255 killed 1 tank captured

The 2016 Southern Aleppo campaign was a series of military operations that started on 1 April when the Islamist rebel coalition Army of Conquest, led by the al-Nusra Front, launched a surprise offensive south of Aleppo. The main objective of the operation was to recapture territory they had lost during the large-scale government offensive in late 2015.

== Campaign ==
=== First offensive (April 2016) ===
In the afternoon of 1 April, rebel forces launched the offensive, targeting the strategic village of Tel el-Ais, that overlooks the Damascus–Aleppo highway. The operation started with preparatory shelling hitting the village's southwestern flank. This was followed up by a ground assault that included an attack conducted by three suicide car bombers against government positions. According to one report, the bombers did not reach their targets, while according to another, they managed to clear the way for the rebel infantry. Still, the attack on Tel el-Ais was eventually repelled. However, soon after, the rebels launched a second assault, and early on 2 April, they captured Tel el-Ais. The Al-Nusra Front claimed they ambushed government troops as they were withdrawing from the village.

After securing the village, the rebels proceeded to attack and seize the Jabal Al-'Eiss (Mount Eiss) area, with the Army withdrawing towards Hader. Meanwhile, elsewhere along the frontline, the rebels captured the villages of Abu Ruwayl, Hawbar and Birnah as the offensive started, however they were recaptured by the military by the following morning. Among the dead on the government side from the previous two days of fighting were 12 Hezbollah fighters and three IRGC officers.

As of early 3 April, a counter-attack had not yet started as government forces were awaiting the arrival of the final batch of ammunition and vehicles. Later in the day, a rebel source stated 100 government vehicles were seen heading towards the southern countryside of Aleppo. At 10 p.m. that evening, the Army counter-attack started and government forces reportedly captured several points on the eastern and northern perimeter of Tel el-Ais, coming to within a few hundred meters of the village. Still, by the morning, two attacks to breach the village itself had been repelled, although the main assault had not yet taken place as airstrikes continued.

On 5 April, a Syrian Air Force plane was shot down in the area of Tel el-Ais by the Al-Nusra Front, with the pilot captured. During the day, members of the Iranian 65th Airborne Special Forces Brigade reportedly arrived in Hader. For the first time since February, Russian air-strikes were conducted in the southern Aleppo countryside, in preparation for the Army counter-attack.

Late on 5 April, the Iranian special forces, supported by Syrian Army troops, attacked the village. In the early hours of the next day, it was incorrectly claimed they recaptured Tel el-Ais. Still, pro-opposition SOHR confirmed government troops made progress in the area of Tel el-Ais. During the day, the rebels temporarily withdrew from the village due to heavy shelling before returning. The same day, another large Army convoy arrived in the area.

On 9 April, the rebels took control of the village of Khalidiyah, near Khan Tuman, as well as two hilltops and large parts of Zaytan, Birnah and al-Qal'ajiyyeh. Meanwhile, government forces intensified their shelling of Tel el-Ais and nearby Zorba, with over 100 mortars and rockets being fired at rebel positions, while Russian air-strikes continued.

The next day, the military recaptured Khalidiyah and the rebels withdrew from Zaytan, Birnah and other positions they had taken during the previous 24 hours. During the rebel assault on Khalidiyah and Khan Tuman, four Iranian commandos were killed, including two members of the 65th Airborne Special Forces Brigade.

On 12 April, a new government assault on Tel el-Ais started. Before the attack, 300 rockets were launched at rebel positions in the area. Fighting also took place near Khan Tuman. The Army managed to advance and capture several hills in the area, as well as most of the village itself. However, this latest attack on Tel el-Ais was also eventually repelled, when government forces withdrew from the village after not being able to take Jabal Al-'Eiss hill. The hills that they had also seized earlier in the day were once again under rebel control.

=== Interlude ===
One week after the end of the offensive, the rebels once again launched a two-pronged attack against Khan Tuman, Zaytan and Birnah. The attack was quickly repelled, with more than 30 rebels reportedly being killed at Khan Tuman and two of their tanks being destroyed.

=== Second offensive (May 2016) ===
On 5 May, the United States and Russia agreed on a cessation of hostilities in Aleppo for 48 hours. However, fighting continued in the city and surrounding areas. The same day, the Army of Conquest militants, supported by Jund al-Aqsa and the Turkistan Islamic Party in Syria (TIP), advanced and captured the village of Khalidiyah, west of Khan Tuman and southwest of Aleppo. The rebels then launched artillery attack on Khan Tuman. During the fighting, the Army destroyed a car bomb with a rocket. Around 7 a.m. on 6 May, the rebels captured Khan Tuman, as well as five other nearby villages. In all, 62 pro-government fighters and 57 rebels were killed in the rebel assault. During the clashes, an air strike hit a heavy concentration of rebels, killing 18 fighters.

Following the capture of Khan Tuman, hundreds of government reinforcements, including Palestinian militiamen, were sent to help recapture the town. Preparations were being made for a counter-attack, with Russian air-strikes reportedly hitting rebel positions in the area. On 7 May, government troops recaptured three villages.

The counter-attack against Khan Tuman started on 8 May, and was reportedly repelled. By 11 May, the fighting in the area of Khan Tuman left 173 fighters dead on both sides and more than 300 wounded. Among those killed on the rebel side were 35 Turkistan Islamic Party members as well as a number of Uzbeks. Among pro-government dead were 55 Afghans, Iranians, Iraqis and Lebanese.

Overnight between 11 and 12 May, heavy Russian air-strikes hit rebel positions in the area of Khan Tuman.

=== Third offensive (June 2016) ===
On 3 June, a new surprise rebel offensive was started. al-Nusra suicide bombers detonated car bombs near Khan Tuman, followed by an assault with heavy armour toward pro-government positions. Ahrar al-Sham then seized the village of Maratah, capturing a large amount munitions crates, a T-62, and a fuel depot. The rebels also took over three more villages, an air defence battalion, and a weapons warehouse. By the next day, the rebels had taken control of five villages. The same day, the Sham Legion launched an anti-tank guided missile at a suspected Syrian Army position near the area, killing a Dagestani al-Qaeda commander in a friendly fire incident.

On 14 June, al-Nusra led a fresh jihadist assault in the southern Aleppo countryside, targeting the villages of Khalsah and Zeitain, controlled by a number of pro-government forces. The jihadists initially captured Zeitain, whilst heavy fighting continued in Khalsah.

On 15 June, the National Defence Forces, Hezbollah and allied forces launched a counter-attack and succeeded in recapturing the village of Zeitan, whilst also repelling the jihadist assault on Khalsah. It was reported that over 20 jihadist fighters had been killed, whilst a rebel T-72 tank and 2 BMP's were destroyed.

On 16 June, a pro-government counter-attack against Maratah was repelled.

During the night of 17 and 18 June, the jihadist rebels led by al-Nusra imposed full control over the villages of Khalsah, Zeitan and Birnah, despite suffering heavy losses, including the death of a top commander. Overall, 186 fighters on both sides were killed in the fighting over the previous four days, 100 rebels and 86 pro-government fighters.

Muhaysini visited Turkistan Islamic Party fighters before the battle and performed dua. Khan Tuman in Aleppo then came under attack by the Uyghur Turkistan Islamic Party. A picture of Muhaysini with a Turkistan Islamic Party fighter in Khan Touman was released by the Turkistan Islamic Party after the battle. They displayed weapons and munitions seized during the battle. Corpses of what the TIP labelled as "Rawafidh" (Shia) fighters and pictures of "Iranian" prisoners were released by the TIP.

== See also ==
- East Aleppo offensive (2015–16)
- Northern Aleppo offensive (February 2016)
- Northern Aleppo offensive (March–June 2016)
- 2016 Khanasir offensive
- 2016 Aleppo summer campaign
