= Jaysh al-Sham (2014) =

Syrian rebel group

Jaysh al-Sham جيش الشام
- Official logo of Jaysh al-Sham
- Dates active: 18 February 2014 – 28 July 2014
- Active regions: Idlib Governorate, Syria
- Size: 1,000+
- Wars: Syrian Civil War

Jaysh al-Sham (Arabic: جيش الشام, "Army of the Levant") was a rebel group active during the Syrian Civil War. The group began when the Suqour al-Sham brigade called Suyouf al-Haq split from its parent organization because it did not want to participate in the fighting between Suqour al-Sham and the Islamic State in Iraq and the Levant (ISIS).

In July 2014, the Liwa Dawud unit defected from Jaysh al-Sham to ISIS, bringing with them 1000 men and 10 tanks. Jaysh al-Sham claimed that it had expelled them. The group was disbanded on 28 July 2014, giving the remaining affiliated groups the option to join other groups.

== Groups involved ==
- Liwaa Suyouf al-Haq (former Suqour al-Sham brigade)
- Liwaa Ansar Allah
- Liwaa Suqour Asharq
- Liwaa fuqra'a ela Allah
- Liwaa Feteat al-Islam
- Liwaa Asuod al-Ghab
- Liwaa Nusor al-Islam
- Jisr al-Shughur Revolutionary Military Council

== Defected groups ==
- Liwaa Dawod (defected and joined the Islamic State of Iraq and the Levant)

== See also ==
- List of armed groups in the Syrian Civil War
