= Mustariha =

Mustariha المستريحة
- Village
- Location in Syria
- Coordinates: 35°47′49″N 37°7′34″E
- Country: Syria
- Governorate: Idlib
- District: Idlib District
- Subdistrict: Abu al-Duhur Nahiyah

Population (2004)
  - Total: 294
- Time zone: UTC+2 (EET)
  - Summer (DST): UTC+3 (EEST)
- City Qrya Pcode: C3894

Mustariha (Arabic: المستريحة) is a Syrian village located in Abu al-Duhur Nahiyah in Idlib District, Idlib. According to the Syria Central Bureau of Statistics (CBS), Mustariha had a population of 294 in the 2004 census.
