= Deir Sunbul, Idlib =

Deir Sunbul, Idlib دير سنبل
- Village
- Location in Syria
- Coordinates: 35°41′57″N 36°36′21″E
- Country: Syria
- Governorate: Idlib
- District: Ariha District
- Subdistrict: Ihsim Nahiyah

Population (2004)
  - Total: 1,751
- Time zone: UTC+2 (EET)
  - Summer (DST): UTC+3 (EEST)
- City Qrya Pcode: C4293

Deir Sunbul, Idlib (Arabic: دير سنبل) is a Syrian village located in Ihsim Nahiyah in Ariha District, Idlib. According to the Syria Central Bureau of Statistics (CBS), Deir Sunbul, Idlib had a population of 1751 in the 2004 census.

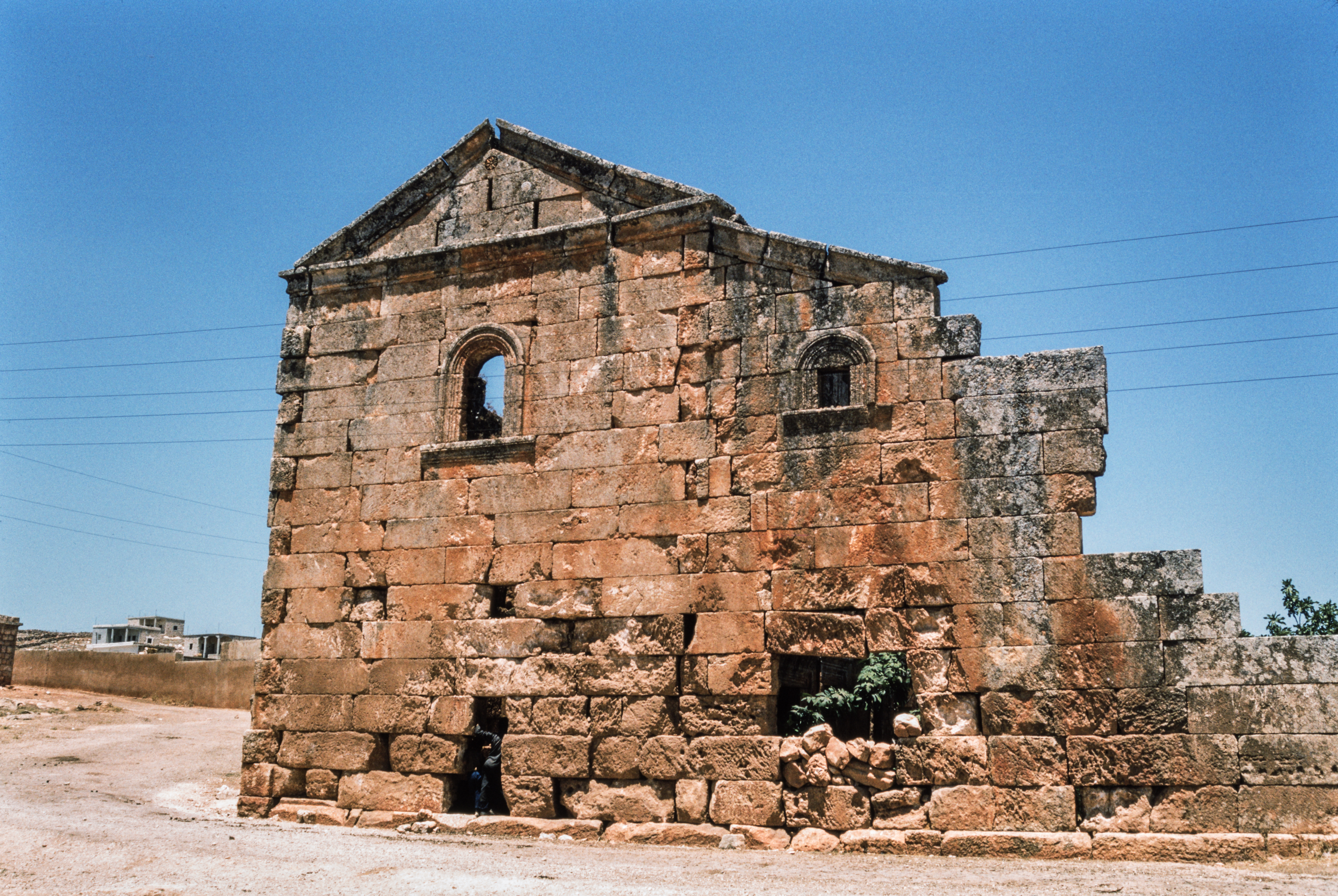
Byzantine villa photographed in 1996 by Frank Kidner

During the Syrian civil war, Deir Sunbul was occupied by Al Nusra and then Hayat Tahrir al-Sham (HTS), an Al-Qaeda linked group, which destroyed a 5th or 6th century Byzantine villa in the archaeological site of Deir Sunbul on 5 October 2017.
