= Siege of Wadi Deif (2012–2013) =

Siege of two Syrian Army bases

- Part of Idlib Governorate clashes (June 2012–April 2013) and the 2012–2013 escalation of the Syrian civil war
- Maarrat al-Nu'man and the strategic M5 highway, the main Army supply route from Hama and Damascus to Aleppo. For a war map of the area around Maarrat al-Nu'man, see Cities and towns during the Syrian civil war.
Date	11 October 2012 – 18 April 2013 (6 months and 1 week)
Location	Maarrat al-Nu'man, Syria
Result	Syrian Army victory: The Wadi Deif and Hamidiyah bases were under continues siege from mid-October 2012 to mid-April 2013; Syrian Army recaptured several villages along the highway leading to Maarrat al-Nu'man and the bases by mid-November 2012; On 14 April 2013, the military broke the siege of Wadi Deif and Hamadiyah

Belligerents
Free Syrian Army; Al-Nusra Front	(Syria) Syrian Arab Republic: Syrian Arab Armed Forces

Commanders and leaders
Col. Heitam Afasi; Jamal Maarouf; Lt. Col. Khaled Hmood	Gen. Riyad Younes

Units involved
Maarrat Al-Nu'man Martyrs Brigade; Farouq Brigades	5th Armored Division: 17th Armoured Brigade

Strength
600+	250–500 soldiers, 15 tanks

Casualties and losses
180–237 killed	Unknown
- 44 civilians killed

The siege of Wadi Deif was a siege of two Syrian Army bases, Wadi Deif and Hamadiyah (both just outside Maarrat al-Nu'man), by rebel forces, starting on 11 October 2012, during the Idlib Governorate clashes (June 2012–April 2013) of the Syrian civil war.

== Background ==
On 8 October, the rebels launched an offensive to capture the town of Maarrat al-Nu'man, which holds a strategic position next to the M5 Highway, a key route which government reinforcements from Damascus would need to use in order to enter the battle in Aleppo. By 10 October, rebels were in control of the city and three days later repulsed a convoy of Army reinforcements that were being sent in an attempt to recapture the town. However, two military bases on the outskirts of Maarrat al-Nu'man remained under Army control and the rebels soon imposed a siege with continuous attacks in a bid to capture them.

The Wadi Deif base was protected by two large outposts: Zahlani, which was just 600 to 700 meters from rebel positions, and Hamidiyah, which also came under a heavier attack by rebels. The two rebel launch points were Maarat al-Numaan and Marshamsheh. In addition to its imposing position near a strategic spot along the south-north Damascus-Aleppo highway, Wadi Deif was also an important barracks with an armored regiment and a fuel depot believed to hold millions of liters in underground silos. There were at least four other smaller checkpoints protecting it, beside Zahlani and Hamidiyah. The rebels were spread out along a 5-km southern front in Maarat al-Numaan, working to take out the Hamidiyah checkpoint. Each position was 100 m from the other. There were seven men per post. The nearest military location was only 400 meters away in some places, 700 in others.

== Siege ==
=== First rebel attacks ===
On 11 October, an AFP reporter said that the rebels were in control of five kilometers of highway running from the town. On the same day, the FSA launched an attack on the Wadi Deif siege, which was being used to shell Maarrat al-Nu'man, just east of the town near the highway. Rebels used at least one captured tank, RPGs and mortar bombs, as the town continued to be hit by airstrikes.

On 14 October, government troops made attempts to block a new rebel attack on the military base with fighting raging in the nearby villages of Maarshurin and Hish. The next day, rebels pushed the military back from the town to two barracks on its outskirts. Rebel commanders called it "a major breakthrough".

=== Army reinforcements sent ===
On 15 October, a column of reinforcements was sent to make an attempt to break through to the base.

On 16 October, the military counter-attack continued with additional air-strikes on the town and surrounding areas. The next day, a military attack helicopter was shot down during fighting in Maarhtat, on the outskirts of Maarrat al-Nu'man.

On 18 October, military fighter jets destroyed two residential buildings and a mosque, where many women and children, who had thought the danger had passed and returned to the town, were taking refuge. Rescue workers said the airstrikes had killed at least 44 people. 23 children were among those killed in the airstrike, including a nine-month-old baby, according to the workers. In the evening, the rebels launched what they said was a "final assault" on the Wadi Daif military base. The rebels claimed to have destroyed three tanks and captured six soldiers in the fighting. Hundreds of rebels were involved in the operation, according to an AFP correspondent. The rebels captured the fertiliser storage area, which is part of the military complex, and killed six soldiers, according to SOHR.

On 19 October, rebels announced they had removed part of a collection of mosaics from the city's museum in order to protect it from ongoing bombardment. The collection was reported to have suffered little looting, though a pre-Islamic era coin collection has gone missing. On 8 October a government jet dropped a bomb close to the building's entrance, shattering its doors and damaging some of the more fragile pieces.

By 20 October, rebels had encircled Wadi Deif on three sides. The base was defended with at least 15 tanks and 250-500 troops. Soldiers inside the base were relying on airdrops for resupply, however most were missing and falling into rebel areas or no man's land. Meanwhile, Army reinforcements had advanced to five kilometers south of Maarrat al-Nu'man, but were still being held back by rebel forces.

On 21 October, four tanks were destroyed as the reinforcement column tried to reach the base.

On 23 October, government air-strikes on Maarrat al-Nu'man and the village of Mar Shamsheh killed and wounded more than two dozen rebels. By this point, the battle for the Wadi Deif base had been going on for two weeks. The fall of the base would result in government forces having only one land route to resupply their forces in Aleppo, via the port of Lattakia. Government control of the base meant the rebels could not claim full control of Maarrat al-Nu'man. The military was using airdrops to resupply the soldiers at the base with bread and other food. Government forces had also been using continuous attacks along the M5 highway to link up with the besieged soldiers based in Wadi Daif. The base itself is believed to hold 5 million liters of kerosene according to a defected army officer. By taking the base, the FSA would also be able to protect their flank and then advance on Jisr al-Shughour and block supply and reinforcement convoys coming in from Latakia for Aleppo.

On 25 October, despite rebel attempts to stop their advance, the military armored column, sent to reinforce the base 10 days before, had arrived near Maarrat al-Nu'man. They deployed south of the town and started shelling rebel forces that were attacking Wadi Daif, thus curbing the two-week-old rebel siege of the military base.

On 26 October, at 10:30am (local time), rebels, including the Islamist Al-Nusra Front, attacked government positions near the Wadi Dief base sparking 'fierce clashes' between the two sides. The Army responded by shelling Deir Sharqi, a nearby village. It is considered to be the first violation of the attempted ceasefire for the Muslim holiday of Eid al-Adha, according to the Syrian Observatory for Human Right. The Al-Nusra Front had earlier warned that, although not the only group to do so, there was "no truce between us and this transgressing regime". According to SOHR, rebels shelled a building in the Waif Dief complex, completely destroying it and killing 9-10 soldiers. SOHR also reported four rebels were killed at the perimeter of the base during the fighting.

On 27 October, in spite of the truce, government forces were moving convoys full of reinforcements up the road to Wadi Deif. FSA fighters were struggling to stop their advance.

=== Army secures the highway ===
On 30 October, rebels clashed with Syrian Army troops south of the city, killing two soldiers and two members of Al-Nusra Front. Also, the military shelled the nearby village of Maarshmareen. Rebel fighters and Syrian Army forces fought new gun battles around the besieged Wadi Deif army base. 28 civilians were killed by government bombings of the city. Rebel fighters had largely left the town itself for the front lines outside of it.

On 31 October and 1 November, air-strikes on the city intensified as clashes just south of Maarrat al-Nu'man continued. The siege of Wadi Deif continued with FSA units, backed by the Al-Nusra Front, trying to capture the base.

By early November, rebels were beginning to fear that they might have to withdraw from the city. Insufficient coordination, supplies, and firepower combined with the intense army pressure and counter-attacks from air and ground make holding the city a "costly" for them. Rebels have also had to use their own monthly wages (US$150) to buy ammunition. Despite the continuous siege of Wadi Deif, the army has kept the base supplied on a regular basis.

By 10 November, after 10 days of fighting, Syrian forces gradually recaptured villages along the highway that leads to Maarrat al-Nu'man. These villages fell to the rebels in early October. Combined with the recent resupply of food and ammunition to the besieged Wadi Deif base, fighting intensified between the two sides. Although government forces had not yet entered the town of Maarrat al-Nu'man and the siege of the Wadi Deif continued, pressure increased on rebel forces in the area.

On 14 November, Syrian forces launched two air strikes on Maaret al-Numan while continuing their attempt to retake the town from the rebels, a battle which has been ongoing since 9 October.

=== Continued fighting ===
On 19 November, rebels and loyalist soldiers clashed south of Maarrat al-Nu'man on the highway and nearby villages. Rebels still controlled the city and the highway entrance to the town. Rebels destroyed two tanks and shot down one helicopter. Rebel fighters also made another advance onto the Wadi Deif army base, where heavy fighting erupted.

On 22 November, rebels claimed to have destroyed two government tanks near the Hamidieh army base.

By 26 November, the vast majority of the city's 150,000 original inhabitants had fled. Much of the city lay in ruins; government media labelled the destruction as the result of a magnitude 6.6 earthquake, but residents maintained that unrelenting shelling of the rebel-controlled city by the military was the actual cause. The stretch of highway running south of the city to Damascus was reportedly under government control, while the stretch running north to Aleppo was not under the firm control of either side. The parallel military highway remained open, but was characterised as a very slow and inefficient supply line due to the roughness of the road.

On 28 November, several rebel brigades launched a fresh assault against the base at Wadi Deif. Clashes in the southern part of Ma'arat al-Nu'man killed four soldiers and one rebel.

=== December and January rebel assaults ===
FSA fighters launched another attack on the base on 25 December, in what was described as the heaviest fighting in months in the area. The attack was commenced by a car bomb and then mortars. 20 rebels, including a "commander" were killed in the fighting.

By 29 December, the renewed rebel offensive against the Wadi Deif base was faltering due to a lack of supplies.

Following the failed December offensive, questions were being raised who was responsible for the rebel failure to capture Wadi Deif. The main cause was pointed to be the divisions among different rebel groups, a lack of coherence in their joint operations due to competition for loot, uneven funding and, according to one report, firebrand clerics who lack an understanding of battle field realities.

In January, more coordinated and planned rebel assaults were launched against the bases, however they too were repulsed with at least another 26 rebels being killed.

=== Siege continues ===
On 7 February, Time Magazine reported that a council of clerics, led by Jahbat al-Nusra, was marshaling supplies and organizing multiple rebel groups around Maarat al-Nu'man, including Suqour al-Sham and the FSA's Idlib Revolutionary Military Council, for a new offensive against the besieged Wadi Deif base. The large government base of Wadi Deif houses an armored regiment and the rebels believe it also holds millions of liters of fuel in underground silos.

On 10 February, intermittent clashes took place between government forces and fighters from several rebel battalions around Wadi al-Dayf and the Hamidiya army base. Areas in Ma'arat al-N'uman city and the Kafruma town were bombarded.

On 11 February, it was reported that armed fighters—allegedly from Jabhat al-Nusra—shot at and beheaded a statue of the blind poet and philosopher Al-Maʿarri, who was born in the city during the Abbasid era. Al-Maʿarri was known for his criticisms of religion, including Islam.

Situation in Ma'arrat al-Nu'man mid-March 2013

On 7 March, a Syrian fighter-jet was downed by anti-aircraft machine-guns while it was bombarding the town of Heish and its surrounding area, in southern Reef Idlib, south of Ma'arat al-Nu'man city. A SOHR activist witnessed the plane falling after it was hit, with black smoke coming out of it. Eyewitnesses reportedly saw the pilots parachuting out of the plane.

=== Siege broken ===
On 13 April, the Syrian Army launched an offensive to resupply the Wadi Deif base, inflicting losses on the rebels. They ambushed the rebels near the village of Babulin. At least 21 rebels were killed and others were wounded in the attack. On 14 April, the rebel siege of the bases had been broken with government troops securing two strategic hilltops, on both sides of the highway, between which half a dozen supply trucks passed to reach the bases. The number of rebel fighters dead or missing in the Army offensive had risen to 50. On 15 April, rebels attempted a counter-attack, although their front was reported to have been weakened in previous weeks due to infighting and the deployment of forces to other battles. Clashes continued into the night at the village of Babulin as rebels made attempts to stop the Army from consolidating their gains. An opposition activist claimed that shouts of people from Babulin were heard on a wireless communication device, calling for rebel fighters to help them, after government forces took control over the town. Rebel fatalities in the two-day government offensive had reportedly reached 100–107. SOHR claimed that if the government is able to hold this gain, they could reopen the whole road to Aleppo and it would have major strategical implication. Rebels attempted a counterattack on 15 April, but their front was weakened due to infighting and deployment of fighters elsewhere.

Rebel fighters claimed that government soldiers disguised themselves as rebels before ambushing opposition fighters. Such disguises included changing their uniforms for civilian clothes used by rebels and wearing religious headbands with sayings such as “There is no God but God”.

On 16 April, rebels managed to recapture the village of al-Tah, pushing back Army troops to Babulin. However, the rebel forces were still not able to re-establish the blockade of the military bases and neither side had full control of the highway.

On 18 April, rebel forces made a fresh attempt to recapture Babulin, although their attack was repelled. Military reinforcements were being sent to the village to reinforce Army positions.

== See also ==
- Second siege of Wadi Deif
