= Shaam News Network =

Syrian opposition media outlet

- شبكة شام الإخبارية
- Abbreviation: SNN
- Region served: Middle East
- Official language: Arabic
- Website: www.shaam.org

Shaam News Network (S.N.N., Arabic: شبكة شام الإخبارية) is a Syrian media outlet. It is named after the Arabic name for the Levant region. It was funded by Syrian-American activists at the beginning of the Syrian revolution in 2011.

It publishes videos, photos and articles by citizen journalists on its website and social media networks. It also publishes a newspaper called Shaam. Many international media used footage published by Shaam News Network, including Al Jazeera English, Associated Press, Al Arabiya, Al Aan TV, and Sky News Arabia.
