= Maasaran =

Maasaran معصران
- Village
- Location in Syria
- Coordinates: 35°42′30″N 36°48′18″E
- Country: Syria
- Governorate: Idlib
- District: Maarrat al-Nu'man District
- Subdistrict: Maarrat al-Nu'man Nahiyah

Population (2004)
  - Total: 8,334
- Time zone: UTC+2 (EET)
  - Summer (DST): UTC+3 (EEST)
- City Qrya Pcode: C3980

Maasaran (Arabic: معصران) is a Syrian village located in Maarrat al-Nu'man Nahiyah in Maarrat al-Nu'man District, Idlib. According to the Syria Central Bureau of Statistics (CBS), Maasaran had a population of 8,334 in the 2004 census.

== Syrian Civil War ==
On 4 February 2018, the village was targeted by the Russian Air Force during air raids.
