= Battle of Morek =

Part of the Syrian Civil War

- Part of the Syrian Civil War
Date	1 February – 23 October 2014 (8 months, 3 weeks and 1 day)
Location	Morek, Syria
Result	Syrian government victory

Belligerents
Syrian Opposition; Free Syrian Army; Islamic Front; Al-Nusra Front; Sham Legion; Liwa Aqab al-Islami	(Syria) Syrian Government; Hezbollah

Commanders and leaders
Mondher Saras (Sham Legion leader); Lt. Col. Ahmad Al-Sa'oud (13th Division leader)	(Syria) Colonel Suheil al-Hassan (Final Assault only)

Units involved
Free Syrian Army; 13th Division; Knights of Justice Brigade	Syrian Armed Forces; Syrian Army; 11th Tank Division; National Defense Force

The Battle of Morek took place during the Syrian Civil War in the Hama Governorate between the rebels and the Syrian Government. The clashes were concentrated around and in the eastern side of the town of Morek (or Murak), as the Syrian Army tried to regain the town after it was lost to the rebels on 1 February 2014. The city was retaken by the rebels shortly after the collapse of the Northwestern Syria offensive (October–November 2015).

== Capture of Morek ==
On 1 February, rebels reportedly took the al-Harsh checkpoint, north of Morek, and the al-Jeser checkpoint, between Helfaya and Taybat al-Imam. They also captured the al-Aboud military checkpoint, thus fully taking control of Morek and cutting the supply line to the Wadi al-Daif and al-Hamidiyah military bases near Maarrat al-Nu'man, and isolating Army checkpoints in Khan Shaykhun. By doing this, the rebels managed to link up with other rebel groups in the eastern and western countryside of Hama.

== Army counter-attack ==
On 3 February, violent clashes took place between the rebels and an Army convoy heading to Morek near the bridge of Soran. According to the SOHR, at least 20 Army soldiers were killed in the fighting. Two days later, violent clashes were taking place at the tank battalion north of Mork, Soran, and on the highway south of Soran. The Army managed to capture Soran. On 11 February, at least 10 pro-government fighters were killed after a suicide car-bomb struck the Al-Aboud checkpoint, south of Mork. On 15 February, the rebels destroyed the Madajin checkpoint near Morek (not to be confused with ones with the same name near Khan Shaykhun and Taybat al-Imam, respectively). On 17 February, it was reported that the Army stormed Mork, but was pushed back by the rebels. The Army entered the perimeter of Mork again later that day. On 28 February, the Army managed to advance towards Mork, amid heavy fighting and mutual bombardments.

== Stalemate and Army advance into eastern Morek ==
On 4 March, violent clashes took place on the international highway south of Morek, while the west side of Morek was struck by air strikes. By 24 March, the rebels had repeatedly fought off attempts by the Army to break through their lines at Morek.

On 4 April, six rebels were killed by clashes around the town and the government forces reportedly captured parts of Morek on 14 April. Between 18 and 22 April, the SOHR reported that rebels managed to disable three Army tanks near Morek and on its perimeter. On 24 April, it was reported that at least 6 soldiers and pro-government fighters were killed and wounded by a rebel ambush on the perimeter of Morek.

On 1 May, rebels managed to capture an Army checkpoint to the south of Morek, while the Army regained control over the eastern district of Mork five days later.

== July–August Army assault ==
On 16 July, the Army renewed its offensive and bombed the town over 20 times in an attempt to storm the rebel-held part of Morek to break the siege of Wadi al-Daif base. The attack resulted in the death of 15 rebels. The SOHR stated that, at this point, the rebels were on the verge of losing the strategic location. At least 11 rebels were killed that day, while at least one soldier and three Hezbollah fighters were killed. The Army conducted at least 10 air strikes the following day.

On 18 July, it was reported that the Army launched 12 air strikes, while it also dropped 6 barrel bombs on Morek. According to the SOHR, the Army captured the tank battalion base north of Morek, but rebels managed to recapture the military site and the '6th point' later that day. At least seven rebels (including a rebel commander) and many pro-government fighters were killed and captured in the fighting. The rebels also allegedly destroyed a tank and recaptured the Kassaret Al Fostoq area, in the east of Morek.

On 20 July, at least seven rebel fighters were killed in an ambush by the Army around Soran. Afterwards, the fighting for Morek returned to a stalemate, with local skirmishes in and around the town.

== Rebels regain lost ground ==
The rebels managed to advance in the southern side of Morek on 29 July, according to the SOHR, and eventually recaptured the southwestern part of the town during the night of 12–13 August. It was also reported that the Army began retreating to the outskirts of Mork. However, fighting continued in the town the next day. On 25 August, rebels advanced in the northern countryside of Morek.

== October Army assault and capture of Morek ==
On 14 October, rebels advanced in the area between the so-called 'Eight point' and Kassarah checkpoint and destroyed three Army vehicles, while it was unclear who controlled the 'Tanks battalion' base north of Morek at that time. On 17 October, it was confirmed the base had been captured by the Army and later in the day it made more advances on the outskirts of the town, as well as inside it, as both sides sent reinforcements to the area. Al-Masdar news reported the Army had captured the Morek–Khan Sheikhoun Road, north of Morek. Although, the SOHR reported continued fighting on the road the next day.

On 23 October, the Syrian Army, backed by allied militias, took back total control of Morek, nine months after it was seized by rebel forces. According to Al-Masdar, over 200 Islamic Front militants, 27 Syrian Army troops and 32 NDF fighters were killed in the final week of the battle. Rebel fighters retreated from the town southwest to Tal Itmeen hill where they were confronted by more government forces and in the late afternoon the Army secured the hill.

== Aftermath ==
On 5 November 2015, rebels seized control of Morek, following clashes with pro-government forces.
