= Abu al-Duhur Air Base =

Abu al-Duhur Air Base قاعدة أبو الظهور الجوية العسكرية
- IATA: none; ICAO: none; LID: OS57

Summary
- Airport type: Military
- Owner: Syrian Armed Forces
- Operator: Syrian Air Force
- In use: Unknown-present
- Coordinates: 35°43′58″N 37°06′06″E

Map
- Location in Syria

Abu al-Duhur Air Base (spelled Abu ad-Duhur, in Arabic: قاعدة أبو الظهور) is a major Syrian Air Force air base. The airbase is located about 5 km east of Abu al-Duhur, in Idlib Governorate.

== Syrian civil war ==
During the Syrian civil war, the airbase was besieged by Syrian rebels from 2012 to 2015. On 9 September 2015, the Army of Conquest, a coalition of Syrian rebel groups, captured the airbase. A video showed a number of fighter jets that had been out of service for several years mostly pulled to the side of the aprons, and rocket launchers. On 10 January 2018, the Syrian army and allies recaptured the air base. Over the course of the Syrian Civil War, the airbase was completely destroyed and rendered useless.

On 30 November 2024, rebel groups led by Hay'at Tahrir al-Sham recaptured the air base along with Shaheed Suad Al-Kayari Airport, during the offensive that led to the fall of the Assad regime.

== Post civil war ==
On 18 August 2026, the Israeli Air Force planes struck the airfield's runways and storage facilities in multiple airstrikes. Israeli officials cited the strikes as part of its efforts to deter use of the base by Turkey and that "Syria chose to ignore" the message that this should not be allowed. The New York Times cited experts stating that the Israeli strikes were prompted by concerns that Turkish air defense systems could be installed at the base and used to prevent Israel from using Syrian airspace as a route for its aircraft to strike Iran.

== See also ==
- List of Syrian Air Force bases
- Siege of Abu al-Duhur Airbase
