= Jamal Maarouf =

Syrian rebel leader

- جمال معروف
- Born: 1975 (age 50–51); Deir Sunbul, Idlib, Syria
- Known for: Leader of the Syrian Martyrs' Brigade
- Military career
- Allegiance: FSA (2011–2025) SDF(2025-2026)
- Branch: Syria Revolutionaries Front (SRF) (December 2013–5 May 2015)
- Service years: 2011–2015
- Rank: Leader of Syrian Martyrs' Brigade; Military Chief of the Syria Revolutionaries Front
- Conflicts: Syrian Civil War; Siege of Wadi Deif; Al-Nusra Front–SRF/Hazzm Movement conflict; Opposition–Islamic State conflict during the Syrian civil war

Jamal Maarouf (Arabic: جمال معروف) is a Syrian revolutionary. He was one of the most powerful rebel leaders in northern Syria during the earlier stages of the Syrian Civil War. He was the military chief of the Syrian Revolutionaries Front and leader of the Syrian Martyrs' Brigade, both part of the Free Syrian Army.

== Biography ==
Before the uprising against president Bashar al-Assad, Jamal Maarouf was a construction worker. He was one of the first to take up arms in the Idlib province against the Assad regime. Jamal Maarouf created the Syrian Martyrs' Brigade in December 2011 and later the Syria Revolutionaries Front, with funding by Saudi Arabia. The SRF was accused of corruption and of hoarding bread to raise prices in areas under its control, prompting the al-Nusra Front to attack it. Maarouf then fled to Turkey after his force was defeated by the al-Nusra Front in late 2014.

On 16 December 2016, Maarouf and other leaders of groups ousted by al-Nusra declared their willingness to return to Syria. Their statement was handwritten and signed by Maarouf, Abdullah Awda (Hazzm Movement), Mithqal al-Abdullah (Ansar Brigades) and Youssef al-Hassan (Haq al-Muqatila Front).

On 16 October 2020, Maarouf broke his long years of silence by putting a statement online, praising those who stand against Hayat Tahrir al-Sham. He also put forward an open initiative aimed at establishing a unified military council.
