= Syrian Martyrs' Brigades =

Free syrian army unit

Union of Martyrs of Syria Battalions and Brigades
- تجمع كتائب وألوية شهداء سوريا
- Official logo of the Syrian Martyrs' Brigade
- Leaders: Jamal Maarouf; Capt. Yusuf Yahya (2011–12); Lt. Alaa Hussein (POW)
- Dates active: 15 December 2011 – 5 May 2015
- Group: Martyrs of Mount Zawiya Battalion
- Headquarters: Jabal Zawiya, Idlib Governorate, Syria
- Active regions: Syria: Idlib Governorate; Hama Governorate; Aleppo Governorate; Latakia Governorate; Raqqa Governorate; Damascus Governorate; Rif Dimashq Governorate
- Size: 7,000–12,000
- Part of: Free Syrian Army: Syria Revolutionaries Front
- Wars: Syrian Civil War

The Syrian Martyrs' Brigades, full name Union of Martyrs of Syria Battalions and Brigades (Arabic: تجمع كتائب وألوية شهداء سوريا), was a unit of the Free Syrian Army and the Syrian Revolutionaries Front which was active in the Idlib Governorate. The unit was formed during the early years of the Syrian Civil War in order to fight against the Syrian Government.

== Background ==
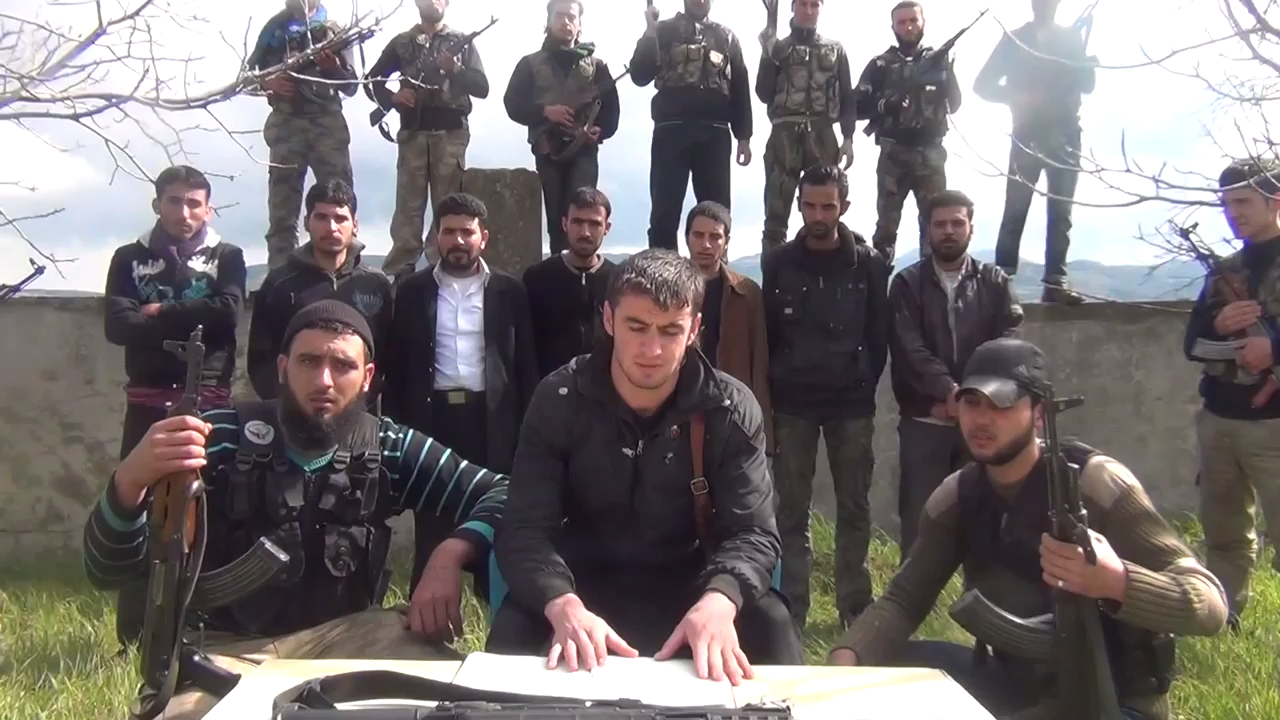
Syrian Navy personnel from Qardaha defect to the Syrian Martyrs Brigades in the Latakia Governorate in February 2013

The Martyrs of Mount Zawiya Battalion was formed on 15 December 2011, operating from the 33 villages that make up the rural Jabal Zawiya region south-west of Idlib. Unlike the other major rebel group that operates out of Jabal Zawiya, Suqour al-Sham, the Martyrs of Mount Zawiya Battalion has been tied closely to the Idlib Military Council, a provincial-level military structure that integrates different rebel groups. By July 2012, as the group expanded its size and operating territory from the Turkish border in the north to Hama in the south, it had changed its name and merged with other groups.

The group was led by Jamal Maarouf (also known as Abu Khalid), who once hunted and worked in construction, and was one of the first men in the area to take up arms against the Syrian security forces, the group has grown to become one of the largest rebel factions in Idlib Governorate.

The Syrian Martyrs' Brigades has traditionally relied on its support from local communities, and much of their weapons has been captured from government forces or purchased from corrupt army units, but it has been reported that the group also receives funds and weaponry from Saudi Arabia.

Popular support for the Martyrs' Brigades dwindled throughout much of 2013 due to the groups perceived lack of any defined ideology and allegations of criminality from rival rebel groups. In December 2013 Maarouf and his group became the leading figures in a new rebel alliance called the Syrian Revolutionaries Front.

== Activity ==
After placing the Syrian Air Force base at Abu al-Duhur under siege, the Syrian Martyrs' Brigades were credited with downing two MiG-21 and one MiG-23 jet fighters in August and September 2012, including one reportedly shot down by Maarouf himself.

In January 2014, the Syrian Martyrs' Brigades killed Haji Bakr, a senior military commander in the Islamic State of Iraq and the Levant group.

== Ideology ==
Unlike the Islamist Suqour al-Sham, the Martyrs of Mount Zawiya Battalion had been described as not motivated by any particular ideology, although the leadership came from a background of Sunni Muslim observance and traditional rural values. The groups subunits were often named after Syrian nationalist figures rather than Islamic ones. Maarouf did not advocate an Islamic state, and was wary of Islamist groups, however his group cooperates with them on the battlefield.

== See also ==
- List of armed groups in the Syrian Civil War
