= Suqour al-Sham Brigades =

Rebel organization in the Syrian Civil War

Suqour al-Sham Brigades أَلْوِيَةُ صُقُورِ الشَّامِ
- Logo of the Suqour al-Sham Brigades, in use since 2018
- Leaders: Ahmad Issa al-Sheikh; Abu Hussein al-Dik †; Ahmad Sarhan ("Abu Satif")
- Dates active: September 2011 – 22 March 2015; 3 September 2016 – 26 January 2017; 26 January 2017 – 2018 (as a semi-autonomous subgroup of Ahrar al-Sham); 2018 – 2025
- Headquarters: Sarjeh, Idlib Governorate, Syria
- Active regions: Idlib Governorate, Syria; Aleppo Governorate, Syria; Homs Governorate
- Ideology: Sunni Islamism; Salafism (from 2015); Jihadism (2013-2014, 2015-present); Post-Salafi jihadism (2015-present)
- Size: 9,000–10,000 (2013); 400 (2014); 1,800 (2017); 3,100 (2023); 2,500 (2024)
- Part of: (Syrian opposition) Free Syrian Army (2011–2013); Syrian Islamic Liberation Front (2012–2013); Islamic Front (2013–2015); Ahrar al-Sham (2015–2016, 2017–2018); Syrian Revolutionary Command Council (2014–2015); National Front for Liberation (August, 2018-December, 2023) (Syrian opposition) Military Operations Command (2023–2025)
- Wars: the Syrian Civil War

The Suqour al-Sham Brigades (Arabic: أَلْوِيَةُ صُقُورِ الشَّامِ, romanized: ʾAlwiyat Ṣuqūr aš-Šām, lit. 'Falcons of the Levant Brigades'), also known as the Falcons of the Levant Brigades, was an armed rebel organisation formed by Ahmed Abu Issa early in the Syrian Civil War to fight against the Syrian Government. It was a member of the Islamic Front and a former unit of the Free Syrian Army and the Syrian Islamic Liberation Front. They have a history of coordinating with Ahrar al-Sham and al-Qaeda's al-Nusra Front (a group rebranded as Tahrir al-Sham since January 2017), though clashes with the latter broke out in January 2017. In March 2015, the Suqour al-Sham Brigades merged with Ahrar ash-Sham, but left Ahrar al-Sham in September 2016. Also, in September 2016, they joined the Army of Conquest, of which Ahrar al-Sham was also a member. On 25 January 2017, Suqour al-Sham rejoined Ahrar al-Sham, but later became independent.

At the Syrian Revolution Victory Conference, which was held on 29 January 2025, most factions of the armed opposition, including the Suqour al-Sham Brigades, announced their dissolution and were incorporated into the newly formed Ministry of Defense.

== Ideology ==
Suqour al-Sham's ideology has been described by Asher Berman of the Institute for the Study of War as Islamist but not having a global jihadist outlook. In a sermon delivered in a mosque in April 2012, Abu Issa said Muslims had lost their honor because they had abandoned jihad, replacing aspirations for martyrdom with a fear of death. However, in an interview in June 2012 Issa described his vision for a post-Assad Syria as a moderate Islamic state "without imposing it on society."

A publication of the Counter Terrorism Centre in August 2013 described Suqour al-Sham as belonging to the most stridently Islamist wing of the Free Syrian Army and the Syrian Islamic Liberation Front. After ending relations with those two organisations it joined the Islamic Front in November 2013, a charter released by the new group described their shared beliefs as rejecting representative democracy and secularism, instead seeking to establish an Islamic State ruled by a Majlis-ash-Shura and implementing Sharia law.

== Activity and tactics ==
As Suquor al-Sham grew in prominence, rebel units in neighboring regions such as Aleppo and Idlib Governorate declared themselves to be members of Suqour al-Sham. The central leadership sometimes recognized their affiliation, but the amount of coordination with these groups was believed to be low. By June 2013 the group had recognised some 17 sub-brigades.

Suqour al-Sham has been known to carry out roadside IED attacks targeting the Syrian Army since its inception. The organization has also carried out attacks on security checkpoints using VBIEDs that had been secretly rigged with explosives and driven unwittingly by released captives, upon reaching the target they were detonated remotely. The group had not been known to carry out suicide bombings as of mid-July 2012.

== History ==
After three months of protests in 2011, the Syrian government released many high-profile Salafist Islamist prisoners from Sednaya Prison such as Zahran Alloush, Hassan Aboud and Ahmed Abu Issa. The Suqour al-Sham Battalion was formed in September 2011 under the leadership of Ahmed Abu Issa in the town of Sarjeh in the Jabal al-Zawiya region of Idlib Governorate. The group's fighters were a mix of military defectors and civilian volunteers. According to its website, the brigade has a civilian and a military wing. The civilian wing was run by a shura council headed by Ahmed Abu Issa, this wing was responsible for acquiring military supplies, food, and media operations. The military wing was independent, but acts on the advice of the civilian leadership.

Suquor al-Sham initially identified itself as part of the Free Syrian Army and recognized the Syrian National Council as the "chief representative of the revolution abroad;" however, the group does not view the SNC as an organization that can legitimately issue orders. In September 2013, Suqour al-Sham was one of a number of rebel groups that issued a communique stating that the SNC was not representative of them and that they were abandoning it. This was followed in December 2013 by a statement from Suqour al-Sham's leader, announcing that they were no longer part of the Free Syrian Army.

In September 2012, a large number of Islamist rebel brigades, including the Farouq Brigades and the Suquor al-Sham formed the Syrian Islamic Liberation Front, under the leadership of Suquor al-Sham commander Ahmed Abu Issa. Abu Issa claimed the new Front had more than 40,000 fighters and aimed to establish a state with an Islamic reference. This alliance was superseded in November 2013 by a new alliance called the Islamic Front, again led by Abu Issa.

By early 2014, Suqour al-Sham had reportedly been substantially weakened following the outbreak of open warfare between many Syrian rebel factions and the Islamic State of Iraq and the Levant. On 21 January 2014, Suqour al-Sham's top religious official, Abu Abderrahman al-Sarmini, defected from the group, in protest of the internecine warfare. In February 2014, the group's top military commander, Mohammed al-Dik (alias Abu Hussein), was killed in an ISIL attack. In the same month, Suqour al-Sham's chief of staff and one of its most powerful founding factions, the Suyouf al-Haq Brigade, announced an unapproved separate peace with ISIL and defected from the group. Suyouf al-Haq joined with Liwa Dawud, a powerful Suqour al-Sham faction that had defected in 2013, to form a new group called Jaysh al-Sham, or the Army of the Levant.

In May 2014, the group conducted joint suicide attacks with the al-Nusra Front that involved American foreign fighter, Moner Mohammad Abu Salha who took part in one of the series of suicide bombings himself against Syrian government forces in Ariha.

In September 2016, after more than a year of being absorbed by Ahrar al-Sham, the Suqour al-Sham Brigades left Ahrar al-Sham while continuing to use the Islamic Front logo. Also, in September 2016, they joined the Army of Conquest, of which Ahrar al-Sham was also a member. On 25 January 2017, Suqour al-Sham rejoined Ahrar al-Sham amid clashes with the al-Nusra Front. By 2018 the group left Ahrar al-Sham again. On 1 August 2018, it joined the National Front for Liberation, with Suqour al-Sham commander Ahmad Sarhan ("Abu Satif") named as the NFL's first deputy commander.

On 6 August 2019, al-Masdar which has been described as a pro-Syrian government news site, claimed that the Russian military carried out an ambush resulting in the death of 14 fighters from the group in the northern part of the Hama Governorate during a Syrian government offensive in the area.

According to a Syrian opposition source and an activist in Afrin, the Suqour al-Sham Brigades were among the Turkish-backed insurgent groups which volunteered to send fighters to Libya as part of a Turkish-led operation to aid the Tripoli-based Government of National Accord in December 2019.

== War crimes ==
The UN Commission of Inquiry for Syria reported that the group unlawfully detained Hekmat Khalil al-De’ar for alleged dealings with the Syrian Democratic Forces. His dead body returned to his family the next day. The autopsy showed that he had been subjected to torture.

== See also ==
- List of armed groups in the Syrian Civil War

== Sources ==
- O'Bagy, E. (September 2012). "Jihad in Syria". Middle East Security Report (6): 1–41.
