= October 2016 Idlib Governorate clashes =

- Part of the inter-rebel conflict during the Syrian Civil War
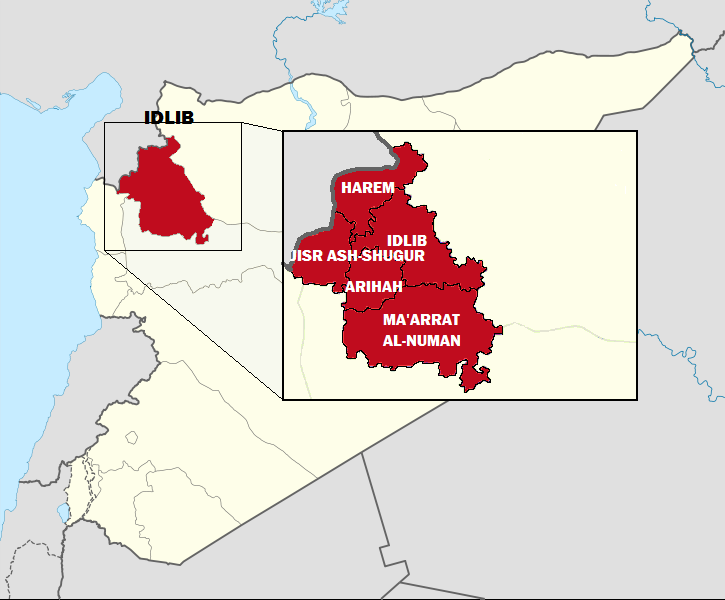
Date	4–13 October 2016 (1 week and 2 days)
Location	Idlib Governorate and Hama Governorate, Syria
Result	Inconclusive: Ahrar al-Sham expels Jund al-Aqsa from Maarat al-Nu'man and 4 other villages; Jund al-Aqsa expels Ahrar al-Sham from Khan Shaykhun; Most of Jund al-Aqsa joins JFS

Belligerents
Ahrar al-Sham; Suqour al-Sham Brigades	Jund al-Aqsa; Jabhat Fateh al-Sham Islamic State of Iraq and the Levant

Commanders and leaders
Abu Yahia al-Hamawi (general commander of Ahrar al-Sham); Muhammad al-Dabbous (executed) (Ahrar al-Sham senior commander); Ali Hilal al-Ahmad (executed) (Ahrar al-Sham commander)	Abu Dhar al-Najdi al-Harethi

Strength
Unknown	1,600 fighters

Casualties and losses
Unknown number of dead, 800 defected	Unknown number of dead, 150 defected to ISIL
- 100–170 fighters killed on both sides

The October 2016 Idlib Governorate clashes were a series of violent confrontations between the Salafi jihadist group Jund al-Aqsa and the Syrian rebel group Ahrar al-Sham, supported by several other rebel groups. The two groups were previously allied during the 2016 Hama offensive, but sporadic clashes also occurred time by time.

== The clashes ==
Tensions between the two groups initiated on 4 October, when Ahrar al-Sham captured a Jund al-Aqsa member accused of being a cell for the Islamic State of Iraq and the Levant. In response, Jund al-Aqsa militants kidnapped an Ahrar al-Sham member, beat his wife, and shot his brother. Both sides called for the release of their captured members and threatened military action.

The conflict escalated on 6 October, as clashes broke out throughout the Idlib Governorate and the northern Hama Governorate. Jund al-Aqsa captured all Ahrar al-Sham positions in the town of Khan Shaykhun and attacked them in northern Hama, while Ahrar al-Sham expelled the former from Maarat al-Nu'man and 4 other villages in Idlib. 800 fighters from Ahrar al-Sham and Jabhat Fateh al-Sham defected to Jund al-Aqsa during the clashes.

As a reaction to the clashes, several other rebel groups signed a statement announcing that they would side with Ahrar al-Sham against Jund al-Aqsa in the conflict. The signatory groups were: Jaysh al-Islam, Suqour al-Sham Brigade, Sham Legion, Army of Mujahideen, Fatah Halab, and Fastaqim Union.

On 8 October, clashes between the two groups spread to a village in Jabal Zawiya, and a senior military commander of Ahrar al-Sham was killed. The next day, in an attempt to end the conflict and find protection, Jund al-Aqsa pledged its allegiance to the al-Qaeda-affiliated al-Nusra Front (also known as Jabhat Fateh al-Sham). However, clashes continued in Idlib, after Ahrar al-Sham rejected the move and vowed to continue fighting Jund al-Aqsa.

Two days later, a ceasefire agreement was signed between Jund al-Aqsa, Ahrar al-Sham, and al-Nusra. However, clashes between the two groups soon erupted again in Idlib. In addition, Jund al-Aqsa, along with al-Nusra, reportedly attacked a base of Ahrar Al-Sham in the town of Tahtaya. Meanwhile, 150 Jund al-Aqsa fighters reportedly defected to ISIL as result of the rebel infighting and their group's pledge to the al-Nusra Front.

On 13 October, the general commander of Ahrar al-Sham announced the "end" of Jund al-Aqsa.

== Aftermath ==
On 22 October, Jund al-Aqsa as part of Jabhat Fatah al-Sham attacked Ahrar al-Sham's headquarter in Sarmin.

In January 2017, the al-Nusra Front launched several coordinated attacks against Ahrar al-Sham headquarters and positions in the northern Idlib Governorate, near the Bab al-Hawa Border Crossing. In addition, al-Nusra also attacked Ahrar al-Sham outposts in Darkush and Jisr al-Shughur. On 20 January, Jund al-Aqsa raided an Ahrar al-Sham prison in the Zawiya Mountain and freed 13 of their prisoners.

== See also ==
- Second Battle of Maarat al-Nu'man
- Idlib Governorate clashes (2017)
