= Army of Aleppo =

Coalition of Syrian rebel groups

- جيش حلب; Jaysh Halab
- Leaders: Hashim al-Sheikh ("Abu Jaber") (February 2016); Abu Abdul Rahman Noor †; Omar Abdul-Razaq ("Abu Bashar al-Mara")(overall commander, since December 2016)
- Dates active: February 2016 – 8 December 2024 (first group); 1 December 2016 – 21 December 2016 (second group)
- Headquarters: Aleppo, Syria
- Active regions: Aleppo, Syria
- Wars: Syrian Civil War

The Jaysh Halab (Arabic: جيش حلب, lit. 'Army of Aleppo') was a coalition of Syrian rebel groups based in rebel-held areas inside the city of Aleppo, Syria. The coalition was created by Hashim al-Sheikh, the former general commander of Ahrar al-Sham with the intent of unifying various rebel groups in Aleppo. After the announcement, nothing was heard of the group until December 2016.

== Initial member groups ==
The joint operations room consisted of both Sunni Islamist and Salafist factions and some Free Syrian Army groups. On its formation on 6 February 2016, the former Ahrar al-Sham commander issued an ultimatum that ordered 15 rebel factions to join the group within 72 hours.

- Ahrar al-Sham
- 101st Infantry Division
- 16th Division
- First Regiment
- Mountain Hawks Brigade
- Sultan Murad Division
- Nour al-Din al-Zenki Movement
- Fastaqim Union
- Muntasir Billah Brigade

== Re-activation ==
On 1 December 2016, during the Aleppo offensive, all rebel groups in southeastern Aleppo reportedly merged into the coalition replacing Fatah Halab in southeastern Aleppo. A new commander, Abu Abdul Rahman Noor was named.

The 2nd iteration of the group includes:

- Ahrar al-Sham
  - Abu Amara Brigades
- Jaysh al-Islam
- Army of Mujahideen
- Nour al-Din al-Zenki Movement
- Sham Legion
- Levant Front
- Sultan Murad Division
- 16th Division remnants
- Elite Islamic Battalions
