= Jaysh al-Ahrar =

Salafi Islamist rebel group in Syria

Jaysh al-Ahrar Army of the Free
- Arabic: جيش الأحرار
- Logo of the group
- Leaders: Hasim al-Sheikh ("Abu Jaber", founder and commander until Sept. 2017); Abu Saleh Tahan; Khalil Ismail Arslan ("Abu Ismail Gubas", deputy commander) †; Walid al-Mushayil ("Abu Hashim", artillery commander)
- Dates active: 1 December 2016–22 January 2017; 14 September 2017-29 January 2025
- Split from: Ahrar al-Sham
- Groups: Liwa al-Tamkeen; Liwa Ahrar al-Jabal al-Wastani; Martyr Ali Mutlaq Battalion; al-Naasan Bloc
- Active regions: Northwestern Syria: Idlib Governorate; Aleppo Governorate; Hama Governorate; Latakia Governorate
- Ideology: Sunni Islamism; Salafism; Salafi Jihadism
- Status: Dissolved
- Size: 1,500–2,000 (Jan. 2017)
- Part of: Tahrir al-Sham (Jan.–Sep. 2017); National Front for Liberation (since Aug. 2018); Defeat the Invaders Operations Room (Feb.–May 2018)
- Wars: the Syrian Civil War

Jaysh al-Ahrar (Arabic: جيش الأحرار, lit. 'Army of the Free'), was an armed Salafi Islamist rebel group in northwestern Syria that originated as a clique composed of 16 units in Ahrar al-Sham that opposed involvement in Operation Euphrates Shield, after a fatwa was released by religious clerics in Jabhat Fatah al-Sham, which led to the group's separation from Ahrar al-Sham.

Most members of the group joined Tahrir al-Sham (HTS) in January 2017. The founding leader of Jaysh al-Ahrar, Hashim al-Sheikh ("Abu Jaber") was appointed as the head of HTS. Jaysh al-Ahrar left HTS in September 2017, and have since then closely cooperated with both HTS and Ahrar al-Sham, as well as other rebel groups in the area.

At the Syrian Revolution Victory Conference, which was held on 29 January 2025, most factions of the armed opposition, including Jaysh al-Ahrar, announced their dissolution and were incorporated into the newly formed Ministry of Defense.

== History ==
=== Formation and HTS ===
On 20 September 2016, Ahrar al-Sham's shura council authorized its fighters to cooperate with the Turkish Armed Forces and the Turkish-backed Free Syrian Army and participate in Operation Euphrates Shield against the Islamic State of Iraq and the Levant and the Syrian Democratic Forces, while the Battle of Aleppo was still active. This led to a split between Ahrar al-Sham's majority pro-Turkey, nationalist and pragmatic faction on one side and its minority Salafi jihadist faction, who favoured a merger with Jabhat Fatah al-Sham, the former Syrian branch of al-Qaeda, on the other. Members of the pragmatic faction opposed such merger in fears of losing support from foreign backers, mainly Turkey.

On 1 December, 16 units from the hardliner faction grouped together under the name of Jaysh al-Ahrar, led by Abu Jaber. Soon after its formation, Jaysh al-Ahrar destroyed Liwa Ahfad al-Sahaba in the Kafr Halab area after the latter killed one of the former's fighters.

On 22 January 2017, amid heavy infighting between Ahrar al-Sham and JFS, Abu Jaber announced the temporary dissolution of Jaysh al-Ahrar, while continuing to push for a merger with JFS. This merger was achieved when JFS, member groups of Jaysh al-Ahrar and other Ahrar al-Sham defectors, Jabhat Ansar al-Din, Liwa al-Haqq, Jaysh al-Sunna, and the Nour al-Din al-Zenki Movement formed Hayat Tahrir al-Sham (HTS) on 28 January. Abu Jaber was named HTS's general commander.

In September 2017, a number of Jaysh al-Ahrar members left HTS due to disagreements with HTS after a leak in which Ahmed al-Sharaa and HTS Idlib commander Abu Hamza Binnish discussed using foreign Salafi jihadist clerics such as Abdullah al-Muhaysini as tools, while Abu Maria al-Qahtani encouraged al-Julani to eliminate other rebel groups and to develop a relationship with Iran. The split came after Muhaysini, as well as another cleric, officially resigned from HTS. However Jaysh al-Ahrar and HTS both agreed to maintain good terms and continue to cooperate.

Abu Jaber remained with HTS. On 1 October, he resigned as HTS's general commander, being replaced by al-Sharaa, who was considered to be HTS's top commander all along. Abu Jaber was then appointed as the head of HTS's shura council.

=== Post-HTS ===
Jaysh al-Ahrar fought alongside other rebel groups, including HTS, Ahrar al-Sham, Free Idlib Army, Army of Victory, Army of Glory, Nour al-Din al-Zenki Movement, and Jund al-Malahim against the Syrian Army's Northwestern Syria campaign (October 2017–February 2018), which resulted in a rebel defeat.

In February 2018, during fighting between Hayat Tahrir al-Sham and the Syrian Liberation Front, a coalition of Ahrar al-Sham and the Nour al-Din al-Zenki Movement, Jaysh al-Ahrar released a statement urging the Turkistan Islamic Party in Syria to not get involved in the fighting on the side of HTS, and for HTS' leader Ahmed al-Sharaa to submit to the authority of a Sharia court in order to mediate the conflict.

On 18 June 2018, unidentified gunmen assassinated Jaysh al-Ahrar deputy commander Khalil Ismail Arslan ("Abu Ismail Gubas") and his son in a village near Saraqib.

On 1 August 2018, the group, along with the Ahrar al-Sham-led Syrian Liberation Front, Suqour al-Sham Brigades, and the Damascus Gathering joined the National Front for Liberation. Walid al-Mushayil ("Abu Hashim"), artillery commander of Jaysh al-Ahrar, was appointed the NFL's second deputy commander.
