= Muntasir Billah Brigade =

Turkmen Free Syrian Army militia

- Arabic: لواء المنتصر بالله, romanized: Liwa al-Muntasir bi-llah Turkish: Muntasır Billah Tugayı
- Logo of the militia
- Leader: Firas Paşa
- Dates active: 2011 – 2013 (Raqqa group); 2013 – 2025 (Aleppo group)
- Ideology: Main: Islamism (Raqqa group); Syrian nationalism Elements: Neo-Ottomanism (Aleppo group); Turanism (Aleppo group)
- Size: 350 (February 2016)
- Part of: Free Syrian Army: Ahfad al-Rasul Brigades (Raqqa group); Syrian National Army (from 2017); Syrian Turkmen Brigades; Army of Aleppo
- Wars: the Syrian Civil War

The Muntasir Billah Division (Arabic: فرقة المنتصر بالله, romanized: Firqah al-Muntasir bi-llah), (Note: The unit was called both "Muntasir Billah Division" as well as "Muntasir Billah Brigade" since around 2017. The militia's official Twitter account uses "Muntasir Billah Division".) also known by its original name Muntasir Billah Brigade (Arabic: لواء المنتصر بالله, romanized: Liwa al-Muntasir bi-llah, lit. "God's Victory Brigade"), was a predominantly ethnic Turkmen Free Syrian Army militia that has taken part in the Syrian Civil War. One of the most prominent pro-Turkish formations in the FSA, the group fought in the Battle of Aleppo (2012–2016) and other campaigns in Aleppo Governorate against the Ba'athist Syrian government, ISIS, and the SDF. The exact origin of the Muntasir Billah Brigade was unclear, and it was possible that it originated as remnant of a rebel group that had been active in Raqqa Governorate until being subsumed by the al-Nusra Front and ISIS in 2013. During the integration of Syrian rebel factions in 2025, the Muntasir Billah Brigade was reorganized into the 72nd Division.

== Etymology ==
The militias in Raqqa and Aleppo were both originally called "Muntasir Billah Brigade". From c. 2018, some sources such as the Anadolu Agency, Al-Araby, Vatan, and others have begun calling the Aleppo group "Muntasir Billah Division". However, other sources such as SOHR, the Syrians for Truth and Justice group, and Smart News continued to call the group "Muntasir Billah Brigade".

== History ==
=== Raqqa militia ===
The exact origin of Raqqa's Muntasir Billah Brigade is unclear. One of its fighters stated that he joined the group "when the revolution began", and NOW News reported that it originated in or around Raqqa city. By early 2013, the Muntasir Billah Brigade was an Islamist-leaning Free Syrian Army militia that operated as part of the Ahfad al-Rasul Brigades and fought against government forces in Raqqa Governorate, while receiving support by Qatar. Though relatively small at the time, the Muntasir Billah Brigade played a significant part during the Battle of Raqqa (March 2013). Having joined the "Raqqa Liberation Front's Military and Revolutionary Council", the unit first helped other rebel groups to clear the city's outskirts of Syrian Army outposts on 3 March. Three days later, Raqqa's remaining garrison handed over the eastern entrance, and then the city's center, to the Muntasir Billah Brigade and the al-Nusra Front, mostly without offering any resistance. It remains unclear how this came to pass. In any case, capturing the city was a major success for the militia, and it subsequently took part in the siege of the nearby 17th Division base which was still held by the Syrian Army.

In July 2013, the Muntasir Billah Brigade and other FSA units in Raqqa united and formed the 11th Division in an attempt to counterbalance the rising power of various Jihadist groups such as the al-Nusra Front, Ahrar al-Sham, and the Islamic State of Iraq and the Levant. As time went on, however, ISIL began to eclipse the other groups in power, so that fighters of the Muntasir Billah Brigade started to defect to the Islamic State. In September 2013, the Muntasir Billah Brigade joined the al-Nusra Front in an attempt to halt its decline. At the time, the militia claimed to consist of 15 battalions. In October, the group fought in Tabqa against government holdouts. After ISIL suppressed the al-Nusra Front in its territory, the Muntasir Billah Brigade lost its protector, and consequently chose to join ISIL in December 2013.

=== Aleppo militia ===
Besides a white flag with its logo, the Muntasir Billah Brigade also uses the regular flag of Turkey as well as a green variant of the latter

It is unclear how and to what extent Raqqa's Muntasir Billah Brigade is related to the militia of the same name that appeared in Aleppo after the former's submission to ISIL. Firas Paşa, leader of Aleppo's Muntasir Billah Brigade, stated in a 2017 interview with TRT World that his militia was founded by Turkmen and Arab natives of Aleppo city in 2013, while NOW News reported that Firas' group "has its origins in Raqqa". Regardless of its origin, the Muntasir Billah Brigade of Firas Paşa was fighting for the Syrian opposition in the Battle for Aleppo by January 2014, and consisted mostly of Turkmens at the time. In October 2015, the militia was among the rebel groups that attacked the YPG-held Sheikh Maqsood district of Aleppo, accusing the YPG of aiding the government and attacking Turkmen villages.

By early 2016, the Muntasir Billah Brigade was still rather small, counting just 350 fighters, but its leader had gained some prominence in Turkey. Paşa "regularly" appeared in Turkish television at the time, talking about the situation of the Turkmens in Syria and attempting to garner support for his group. Meanwhile, the Muntasir Billah Brigade suffered from heavy Russian airstrikes, causing Paşa to argue that "if there were no Russian planes, there would be no Assad today". The militia joined the "Army of Aleppo" rebel coalition in February, and subsequently took part in unsuccessfully resisting a large Russian-backed offensive by government forces as well as the Syrian Democratic Forces in the northern Aleppo countryside. The Muntasir Billah Brigade also fought in the Northern Aleppo offensive (March–June 2016) against ISIL, this time as part of the Army of Conquest. On 20 June 2016, the militia took part in a prisoner exchange with Liwa al-Quds, a pro-government militia.

Like several other Turkmen FSA units, the Muntasir Billah Brigade moved at least part of its forces from Aleppo city to support the Turkish-led Operation Euphrates Shield in November 2016. This further weakened the last rebel resistance in the city, which was fully retaken by government forces in the following December. A senior official of the Muntasir Billah Brigade justified the retreat by arguing that the rebel defeat in Aleppo had become inevitable anyway. The group arrested three Syrian Army soldiers near al-Bab in May 2017, reportedly to prevent them from looting a village. In early 2018, the militia took part in Operation Olive Branch which resulted in the conquest of Afrin Canton from the SDF. After the capture of Afrin city, the Muntasir Billah Brigade distributed 300 tons of sugar among the local populace. The group claimed that the sugar had been captured from the "black market storage room of the PYD" and this proved that "the Turkish army and the Free Syrian Army, have come here [Afrin] to put an end to [the PYD's] oppression". On the other side, the pro-PYD Hawar News Agency accused the unit and allied groups of looting antiquities in the Mobata district.

By 2020, the Muntasir Billah Brigade was one of several Syrian National Army groups which still controlled Afrin and the surrounding countryside. According to the Syrians for Truth and Justice group, the Muntasir Billah Brigade was involved in an arbitrary arrest of a civilian in Rajo in March 2020, followed by demands of ransom.

== Organization and ideology ==
The Muntasir Billah Brigade is prominently led by Firas Paşa, and consisted of 350 fighters, 170 of them ethnic Turkmen, by February 2016. The group is among the Syrian rebel groups that support or at least tolerate Turkish nationalist or pan-Turkic ideologies like Neo-Ottomanism and Turanism. As result, the Muntasir Billah Brigade has been associated with various Turkish right-wing or Islamist associations: By 2016, the militia received aid from the Grey Wolves and Great Unity Party, though Firas Paşa claimed at the time that no Turkish citizens were fighting with his group. By 2018, several Turkish jihadists and ultranationalists had joined the militia. Despite this, Firas Paşa has argued that his group makes no great distinction between Turkmens and Arabs, and mostly accepts aid by Turkish and Islamist groups out of simple necessity.

The militia has also received support by the Turkish state, particularly after joining the Syrian National Army. Parts of the Muntasir Billah Brigade were trained by the Turkish Armed Forces in early 2018. By 2019, the unit served as "Brigade 122", part of the Division 12, in the Syrian National Army's First Legion. The militia is also known to distribute and organize humanitarian aid in the Aleppo countryside, and was supported by organizations like Türkmen-Der and the Turkish Red Crescent in this regard. By 2020, the group was still described as a Turkmen militia by SOHR.
