= Idlib Governorate clashes (January–March 2017) =

Military confrontations

- Part of the Syrian Civil War, and the Inter-rebel conflict during the Syrian civil war
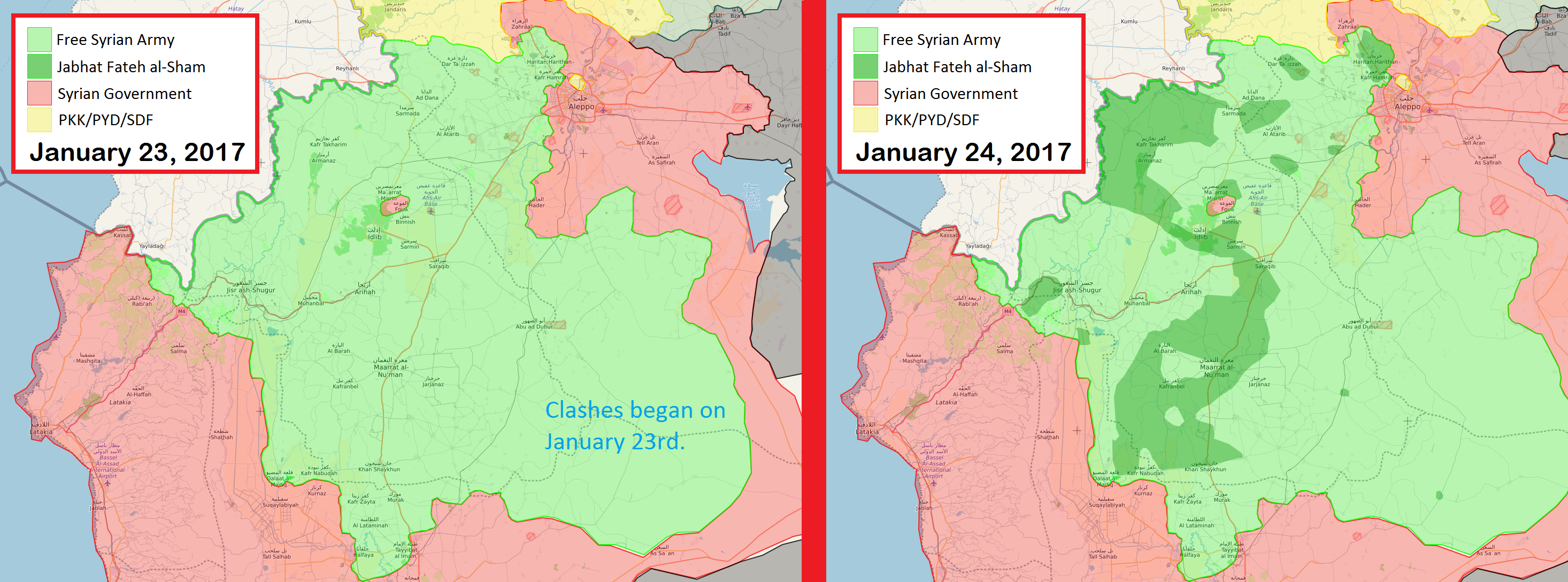
- Map of region of Idlib and western Aleppo where the conflict took place
Date	20 January – 9 March 2017 (1 month, 2 weeks and 3 days)
Location	Idlib Governorate, western Aleppo Governorate, and north Hama Governorate, Syria
Result	Hay'at Tahrir al-Sham victory: Jabhat Fatah al-Sham captures Anadan, Kafr Hamra, Halfaya, and Hayyan; Ahrar al-Sham captures multiple villages in northern Jabal Zawiya, and Saraqib; Jund al-Aqsa captures 17 towns and villages, including Kafr Zita, Taybat al-Imam and Morek; Hay'at Tahrir al-Sham recaptures al-Tamanah, Kafr Zita, Khan Shaykhun, Morek, and 13 other villages from Jund al-Aqsa; Local civilians expel Ahrar al-Sham from Kafr Nabudah; Jund al-Aqsa forces withdraw from Idlib Province to join ISIL in the Raqqa Governorate

Belligerents
Ahrar al-Sham (Syrian opposition) Free Syrian Army; Ajnad al-Sham; Saraya al-Ghuraba; Al-Maghawir	Hay'at Tahrir al-Sham; Turkistan Islamic Party	Islamic State

Commanders and leaders
Abu Ammar al-Omar (Ahrar al-Sham general commander); Rawad al-Khalifa † (Ahrar al-Sham commander); Lt. Col. Muhammad Bakr (Army of Mujahideen commander) (Syrian opposition) Capt. Tariq Jadou (executed) (Army of Victory military commander) (Syrian opposition) 1st Lt. Mohammed Dukhan (executed) (Army of Victory commander) (Syrian opposition) Lt. Col. Ammar Dayoub (executed) (Free Idlib Army commander) (Syrian opposition) Mustafa Abu al-Hadid (executed) (Central Division commander) (Syrian opposition) Saddam al-Mohammed (executed) (FSA commander) (Syrian opposition) Eagle Abu Qusay Hussein Khalil (executed) (FSA commander)	Abu Mohammad al-Julani; Abu Jaber Sheikh; Abdul Rahim Atoun	(Islamic State) "Karmo"

Units involved
Ahrar al-Sham; Suqour al-Sham Brigade (since 25 January); Jaysh al-Islam (Idlib branch, part of AAS since 25 Jan.); Fastaqim Union (part of AAS since 25 January); Army of Mujahideen (part of AAS since 25 January); 101st Brigade; (Syrian opposition) Levant Front (Western Aleppo branch part of AAS since 25 Jan.); (Syrian opposition) Free Syrian Army; Sham Legion; (Syrian opposition) Free Idlib Army; (Syrian opposition) Jaysh al-Nasr; (Syrian opposition) Central Division	Hay'at Tahrir al-Sham; Jabhat Fatah al-Sham (part of HTS since 28 January); Jund al-Aqsa (Until 23 January); Nour al-Din al-Zenki Movement (part of HTS since 28 January); Ansar al-Din Front (part of HTS since 28 January); Jaysh al-Sunna (part of HTS since 28 January); Liwa al-Haqq (part of HTS since 28 January); Pro-JFS elements of Ahrar al-Sham	Military of the Islamic State; Jund al-Aqsa (7–22 February) (Note: Jund al-Aqsa was part of Jabhat Fateh al-Sham (JFS) until 23 January; it also became known as Liwa al-Aqsa since 7 February. The group was allied with HTS until 13 February, when clashes erupted between the two groups)

Strength
Several thousand fighters	400 Zenki fighters	Up to 2,100 militants

Casualties and losses
250 captured (160–197 executed)	107 killed	52 killed
- 2+ civilians killed

The Idlib Governorate clashes (January–March 2017), were military confrontations between Ahrar al-Sham and their allies on one side and the al-Qaeda-aligned Jabhat Fatah al-Sham (which disbanded in 28 January and joined Hay'at Tahrir al-Sham) and their allies on the other. After 7 February, the clashes also included Jund al-Aqsa as a third belligerent, which had re-branded itself as Liwa al-Aqsa and was attacking the other combatants. The battles were fought in the Idlib Governorate and the western countryside of the Aleppo Governorate.

== Background ==
In October 2016, major clashes erupted between Ahrar al-Sham and Jund al-Aqsa in the Idlib province. This resulted in most of Jund al-Aqsa pledging allegiance to Jabhat Fatah al-Sham (JFS) on 13 October 2016. Sporadic clashes continued for the next few months.

Another reason for the recent attacks by JFS were airstrikes conducted by the US Air Force earlier in January, which killed more than 100 fighters belonging to the group. Jabhat Fatah al-Sham accused rival opposition groups of providing targeting information to the United States. In a statement released by JFS, the group claimed its attacks were to "prevent conspiracies" against them.

One of the rebel groups involved in the conflict, the Army of Mujahideen, is a party to the peace talks in Astana, Kazakhstan. Representatives from Jaysh al-Islam and the Sham Legion, along with 13 more factions are also involved. Ahrar al-Sham, on the other hand, refused to participate in Astana due to their relations with JFS. Negotiations between Syrian government and opposition representatives began on 23 January.

== The clashes ==
=== January 2017 ===
On 20 January 2017, Jabhat Fatah al-Sham (JFS) launched several coordinated attacks against Ahrar al-Sham headquarters and positions in the northern Idlib Governorate, near the Bab al-Hawa Border Crossing. JFS also attacked Ahrar al-Sham outposts in Darkush and Jisr al-Shughur. On the same day, Jund al-Aqsa raided an Ahrar al-Sham prison in Jabal Zawiya and freed 13 of their prisoners.

On 23 January, JFS announced that it has expelled Jund al-Aqsa from its ranks. Clashes then continued. JFS fighters, with support from the Nour al-Din al-Zenki Movement, captured the headquarters of the Army of Mujahideen in western Aleppo. They also proceeded to attack the Levant Front in Haritan.

By 24 January, the Army of Mujahideen joined Ahrar al-Sham after its defeat by JFS. Ahrar al-Sham then deployed several military convoys to the countryside of Idlib and western Aleppo in order to deter attacks by JFS. Meanwhile, the Sham Legion repelled a JFS attack against a Mujahideen Army base in rural Idlib.

On 25 January, JFS militants captured the Idlib central prison from the Suqour al-Sham Brigade.

By 26 January, Ahrar al-Sham and its allies had captured multiple villages in the northern part of the Jabal Zawiya region from JFS, in a region between Balyin, Kafr Naya, and Maarrat al-Nu'man. On the same day, militants loyal to JFS captured the strategic town of Halfaya from rival opposition forces. The next day, JFS forces attacked the headquarters of Jaysh al-Islam in northern Idlib. By 27 January, it was reported that JFS had lost over 35 fighters in the clashes with other rebel groups.

During the clashes, it was reported that civilians gathered near settlements caught in the conflict and protested against Fatah al-Sham's attacks on rival opposition forces, and called on the conflict to end in order to save civilian lives.

On 28 January, JFS disbanded and merged with several other Islamist groups and formed Hay'at Tahrir al-Sham. The overall mission for this new front is likely to consolidate power in northwestern Syria against rival opposition groups, most prominently Ahrar al-Sham.

On 30 January, there were reports of mobilizations by Hay'at Tahrir al-Sham and Ahrar ash-Sham at the Bab al-Hawa Border Crossing and other nearby areas, and that the 2 groups were preparing for another round of clashes.

=== February 2017 ===
On 2 February, Hay'at Tahrir al-Sham's former JFS forces attempted to occupy a bakery in Atarib, the largest bakery in western Aleppo, but withdrew after protests by residents. Several days later, the Uzbek Jihadist group Katibat al-Tawhid wal-Jihad pledged its allegiance to Hay'at Tahrir al-Sham.

On 7 February 2017, Jund al-Aqsa attacked the headquarters of Jaysh al-Nasr near the town of Murak, in northern Hama. Jund al-Aqsa then captured the town of Kafr Zita and stormed Taybat al-Imam, capturing more than 250 fighters and weapons from Jaysh al-Nasr. On 9 February, Jund al-Aqsa attacked the headquarters of Ajnad al-Sham, Saraya al-Ghuraba, Liwa al-Maghawir and several other rebel units around Kafr Zita and in other areas in the northern Hama countryside, expanding its influence and capturing weapons, supplies and vehicles. By then, Jund al-Aqsa had taken full control of 17 towns and villages overall.

During the afternoon of 11 February, local civilians expelled Islamist rebels of Ahrar al-Sham and Jaysh al-Nasr from the town of Kafr Nabudah. The rebels were mobilizing in the town to prepare for an offensive in northern Hama. Protesters threw stones and attacked the rebel convoy, killing 3 and injuring 20 of the rebel fighters.

On 13 February, clashes erupted between the previously allied Hay'at Tahrir al-Sham and Jund al-Aqsa in northern Hama and southern Idlib. HTS declared war on Jund al-Aqsa as a result, and the clashes resulted in the deaths of almost 70 fighters on both sides. At least 17 of those killed were Jund al-Aqsa fighters, Abu Bakr Tamanna, who led a group of suicide bombers for JFS during the rebel the attempt to break the siege of Aleppo, at the 3000 apartments, was killed by Liwa al-Aqsa. During the fighting, Kafers Jonah village was captured by Liwa al-Aqsa after its general security leader Abu Rihana was killed by Hay'at Tahrir al-Sham.

On 14 February, Jund al-Aqsa announced the execution of 150–200 prisoners of war, including both HTS and FSA fighters. More than 160 of those executed were FSA fighters, including more than 70 from Jaysh al-Nasr, while 43 were HTS members who were killed after a Sharia Court was stormed in Idlib's rural countryside in Moqa village by Liwa al-Aqsa. In order to secure a potential withdraw the Syrian opposition and Liwa Aqsa engaged in talks. Still, on the next day, HTS captured the village of Heish from Jund al-Aqsa, and then besieged the retreating Jund al-Aqsa forces in Khan Shaykhun and Murak. The Turkistan Islamic Party and Hay'at Tahrir al-Sham surrounded Liwa Al-Aqsa in Mourak and Khan Shaykhoun. Turkistan Islamic Party and Liwa al-Aqsa negotiated an agreement.

On 19 February, it was reported that 600 Jund al-Aqsa militants would be transported to the Ar-Raqqah Governorate to join ISIL, while the remaining Jund al-Aqsa forces would surrender their heavy weapons and join the Turkistan Islamic Party within 72 hours. By this point, it was reported that over 250 Free Syrian Army and Hay'at Tahrir al-Sham fighters had been killed in clashes by Jund al-Aqsa. That afternoon, a convoy of Jund al-Aqsa members and their relatives tried to cross from Idlib Province into the Raqqa Governorate, across a Syrian government supply route to Aleppo, stretching from Ithriyah to Salamiyah, in order to escape the rebel infighting. However, they were ambushed by the National Defence Forces, resulting in several deaths, with rest of the militants surrendering themselves. On the same day, Tahir al-Sham stormed Jaysh al-Islam positions near the Bab al-Hawa Border Crossing and captured heavy weapons. HTS also occupied several abandoned warehouses formerly belonging to the Hazzm Movement.

On 22 February, the last of Liwa al-Aqsa's 2,100 militants left Khan Skaykhun to join ISIL in Ar-Raqqah province, after a negotiated withdrawal deal with Hay'at Tahrir al-Sham and the Turkistan Islamic Party. Armored vehicles, tanks, and heavy weapons were all burned by Liwa al-Aqsa during their withdrawal. Afterwards, Hay'at Tahrir al-Sham declared the termination of Liwa al-Aqsa, and promised to watch for any remaining cells.

On 23 February, the relatives of the FSA prisoners executed by Liwa al-Aqsa accused the group of treating them worse than the Syrian government ever did. Around Khan Seikhoun, mass graves were discovered following Liwa al-Aqsa's retreat. Between 22 and 23 February, two separate mass graves containing the bodies of at least 131 executed rebels were found near the town. This was in addition to the discovery of the bodies of 41 fighters the previous week.

On 25 February, Ahrar al-Sham raided the Free Idlib Army's headquarters and warehouses in the village of Aqrab. Its fighters occupied the area for "protecting" the FIA from a potential HTS attack. The Free Idlib Army, however, denied that they were under attack by Ahrar al-Sham. Three days later, HTS attacked a Sham Legion headquarters in northern Idlib, and captured an arms depot.

=== March 2017 ===
On 2 March, according to pro-government sources, the Sham Legion split into three armed groups, while fighting erupted in town of Saraqib, after a brigade in Ahrar al-Sham defected to Hay'at Tahrir al-Sham. The former Ahrar al-Sham brigade had been responsible for manufacturing and maintaining Ahrar al-Sham's weapons, according to pro-government sources. On 3 March, according to pro-government sources, the clashes escalated, with clashes erupting between Ahrar al-Sham and Hay'at Tahrir al-Sham in the city of Salqin.

On 6 March, according to pro-government sources, Hay'at Tahrir al-Sham attacked Ahrar al-Sham inside of Al-Mastoumeh and Kafr Yahmoul, to the south of Idlib, and captured several checkpoints inside of those villages, severing the main Idlib-Ariha road.

On 7 March, according to pro-government sources, three Hay'at Tahrir al-Sham fighters died when their vehicle hit an IED in the eastern Hama province; one of the fighters was reportedly as young as 14 years old. Later that day, Hay'at Tahrir al-Sham and Ahrar al-Sham signed a ceasefire deal to end the fighting between them, and to create a new council to resolve their issues diplomatically instead of fighting. However, two days later, according to pro-government sources, clashes broke out between Ahrar al-Sham and Hay'at Tahrir al-Sham again in the Jabal Zawiya region, after Hay'at Tahrir al-Sham attempted to arrest a senior Ahrar al-Sham leader in the area.

== US aid for Syrian rebels ==
During the infighting, CIA military aid was frozen, due to the Islamist attacks on FSA groups in the Idlib Governorate. Salaries, training, and ammunition were halted, due to fears of falling into Islamist hands.

On 10 March 2017, United States labeled Hay'at Tahrir al-Sham a terrorist organization, although in the past it supported and provided military assistance to some rebel groups which are now part of this alliance, most notably Harakat Nour al-Din al-Zenki.

== Aftermath ==
After the inter-rebel clashes, HTS grew further in size and launched the 2017 Hama offensive in March 2017.

On 5 April 2017, a vehicle carrying Lt. Col. Ahmed al-Saud of the 13th Division and Col. Ali al-Samahi, the chief of staff of the Free Idlib Army, came under fire from Hay'at Tahrir al-Sham fighters at a checkpoint near Khan al-Subul, which was under complete control of HTS. Al-Samahi and another FSA fighter was killed in the shootout, while al-Saud was wounded and was transferred to Turkey for treatment.

On 29 May, Ahrar al-Sham reportedly executed at least 6 fighters of Hay'at Tahrir al-Sham after capturing them in southern Idlib province. On 4 June 5 fighters of the Sham Legion were killed and 2 wounded after their vehicle hit a roadside bomb.

From 6 to 8 June, clashes broke out between Hay'at Tahrir al-Sham and Sham Legion in Maarrat al-Nu'man. The Free Idlib Army's 13th Division and the Free Police joined the fighting on 8 June. By the evening of 8 June, HTS captured both the 13th Division and the Sham Legion's headquarters in Maarat al-Nu'man and killed Col. Tayser al-Samahi, the brother of Col. Ali al-Samahi and the head of the Free Police in the town. Ahrar al-Sham reportedly deployed fighters to the town during the fighting. On 9 June, Hay'at Tahrir al-Sham announced the completion of their operations against the FSA and took full control of the town. Later that day, a ceasefire agreement was signed between the Free Idlib Army and Hay'at Tahrir al-Sham in the town and the latter ordered the 13th Division to be disbanded.

From 14 to 23 July, clashes erupted between Ahrar al-Sham and Suqour al-Sham against Hay'at Tahrir al-Sham in multiple locations in the Idlib Governorate, including Saraqib and Jabal Zawiya. These clashes resulted in HTS capturing Idlib city and most of the areas bordering Turkey.

== See also ==
- Al-Nusra Front–SRF/Hazzm Movement conflict
- October 2016 Idlib Governorate clashes
- Second Battle of Idlib
- Siege of al-Fu'ah and Kafriya
- Qaboun offensive (February–March 2017)
- Khan Shaykhun chemical attack
