= Abu Jaber Sheikh =

Syrian rebel commander

- أبو جابر الشيخ

Emir (General-Commander) of Hay'at Tahrir al-Sham (Nominal leader of the Hay'at Tahrir al-Sham)
- In office 28 January 2017 – 1 October 2017
- Leader: Ahmed al-Sharaa (as de facto Military Commander of Hay'at Tahrir al-Sham)
- Preceded by: Position established Ahmed al-Sharaa as Emir of Jabhat Fatah al-Sham
- Succeeded by: Ahmed al-Sharaa

Commander of Jaysh al-Ahrar
- In office 1 December 2016 – September 2017
- Preceded by: Office established
- Succeeded by: Unknown

Commander of Jaysh Halab
- In office February 2016 – 1 December 2016
- Preceded by: Office established
- Succeeded by: Abdul Rahman Noor and Omar Abdul-Razaq (as commanders); Abu al-Abd Ashidaa (as emir)

General-Commander of Harakat Ahrar al-Sham al-Islamiyya
- In office 9 September 2014 – 12 September 2015
- Preceded by: Hassan Aboud
- Succeeded by: Abu Yahia al-Hamawi

Head of the Shura council (also Shura council leader or also Shura head)
- In office 2 October 2017 – 29 January 2025
- Preceded by: Office established
- Succeeded by: Office abolished

Personal details
- Born: Hashim al-Sheikh; 1968 (age 57–58) Maskanah, Syria
- Education: University of Aleppo
- Nickname: Abu Jaber Sheikh

Military service
- Allegiance: Harakat Fajr ash-Sham al-Islamiya (2012–14); Ahrar al-Sham (2014–15); Army of Aleppo (February 2016); Hay'at Tahrir al-Sham; Jaysh al-Ahrar
- Branch/service: Hay'at Tahrir al-Sham
- Years of service: 2011–2025
- Commands: General commander of Ahrar al-Sham (2014–15); Commander of the Army of Aleppo (February 2016); Emir of Tahrir al-Sham (January–October 2017); Shura head of Tahrir al-Sham (October 2017–January 2025)
- Battles/wars: Syrian Civil War; Battle of Aleppo (2012–2016); Northern Aleppo offensive (February 2016); Hama offensive (March–April 2017)

Hashim al-Sheikh (Arabic: هاشم الشيخ), also known by his nom de guerre Abu Jaber Sheikh (Arabic: أبو جابر الشيخ), is a Syrian military officer who served in Hay'at Tahrir al-Sham during the Syrian civil war. Previously a senior commander in Ahrar al-Sham, he directed its merger with other Islamist groups to form Hay'at Tahrir al-Sham.

== Pre-war activities ==
Several accounts indicate that Abu Jaber was born in 1968 in Aleppo and later received a bachelor's degree in mechanical engineering at the University of Aleppo. After this, he worked at the Defence Factories near as-Safira. His Islamist activities and opposition against the Ba'athist government led to him being arrested by the Syrian government several times. In 2005, he was imprisoned in the Sednaya Prison, infamous for holding a number of other Salafist prisoners who were later released.

== Syrian Civil War ==
On 25 September 2011, during the early phase of the Syrian Civil War, Abu Jaber was released from Sednaya Prison along with a number of other Salafist and Islamist political prisoners. He joined Harakat Fajr ash-Sham al-Islamiya and fought alongside the al-Nusra Front. He led a subgroup within Harakat Fajr ash-Sham al-Islamiya called the Mus‘ab ibn 'Umair Battalion, which became one of the founding members of Ahrar al-Sham. As of 2017, Abu Jaber was one of the three surviving founding figures of Ahrar al-Sham.

In September 2014, the founder and commander of Ahrar al-Sham, Hassan Aboud, was assassinated along with 45 of his fighters in a bombing in the Idlib Governorate. Abu Jaber replaced his position and became the overall commander of Ahrar al-Sham. He resigned and was replaced by Muhannad al-Masri (Abu Yahia al-Hamawi) in September 2015. An Ahrar al-Sham spokesman described Abu Jaber's leadership as the "hardest" period of the group.

On 15 February 2016, during the northern Aleppo offensive, 8 rebel factions pledged allegiance to Abu Jaber and established the Army of Aleppo to fight the Syrian Armed Forces and the Syrian Democratic Forces, including the Army of Revolutionaries.

On 28 January 2017, Abu Jaber and dozens of other Ahrar al-Sham commanders declared their resignation from Ahrar al-Sham as five major Sunni Islamist rebel groups, including Jaysh al-Ahrar and Jabhat Fatah al-Sham, merged into Tahrir al-Sham. Abu Jaber became the group's emir. Abu Jaber is one of the three surviving founding leaders of Ahrar al-Sham.

On 1 October 2017, Abu Jaber resigned from his position as the general commander of Tahrir al-Sham, being replaced by Ahmed al-Sharaa (also known as Abu Mohammad al-Julani). Abu Jaber took another position as the head of HTS's Shura council.

== See also ==
- Hassan Soufan
