= Ajnad al-Sham =

Rebel group in the Syrian Civil War

- أجناد الشام
- The Black Standard used by Ajnad al-Sham
- Leaders: Sheikh Abu Ibrahim al-Diri Abu Hamza al-Hamwi (former); Abu Abdullah Taoum †; Abdel Aziz al-Ali †; Zainuri Kamaruddin (2014)
- Dates active: November 2013 – 28 April 2017
- Groups: Martyr Khalid Zaarour Battalion (former); al-Majd Brigade (former)
- Active regions: Idlib Governorate; Hama Governorate
- Ideology: Sunni Islamism: Salafi Jihadism
- Part of: Army of Conquest (2015–2017); Tahrir al-Sham (Jan.-Jun. 2017; Nov. 2017-Jan. 2025); Ahrar al-Sham (Jun.-Nov. 2017)
- Wars: the Syrian Civil War

The Ajnad al-Sham (Arabic: أجناد الشام, Soldiers of the Levant) was an independent Idlib and Hama-based rebel group active during the Syrian Civil War. The group is named after Ajnad al-Sham. It joined the Army of Conquest on 24 March 2015 and took part in the Second Battle of Idlib. On 29 March 2014, it announced that its military leader, Abu Abdullah Taoum, was killed during clashes around al-Fouaa.

== History ==
On 5 November 2015, during the 2nd Northwestern Syria offensive, Ajnad al-Sham militants in the Hama Governorate killed and beheaded an unnamed Syrian Army Brigadier general and placed his head in a bin. They posted a picture of it on Facebook and Twitter where fellow militants praised this execution and labelled the Brigadier general with derogatory slogans like "Nusayri" - a term for Alawites.

In May 2016, a statement by the group threatened to retaliate against government forces if demands related to a prison riot in Hama were not met. On 5 May, as part of the Southern Aleppo campaign, members of Ajnad al Sham, Al Nusra Front and the Free Syrian Army assaulted the village of Khan Tuman, leaving 43 assailants (including suicide bombers), 30 Syrian and Iranian soldiers and other 21 wounded.

In June, Ajnad al-Sham along with more rebel groups led a new jihadist assault in the southern Aleppo countryside, targeting the villages of Khalsah and Zeitain, controlled pro-government forces, leaving near 86 soldiers killed. The rebels initially captured Zeytan, whilst heavy fighting continued in Khalsah. The group continued its armed campaign in the next months. The incident most notorious was the attack with Hamdaniyeh neighborhood, which left three civilians killed and other twelve wounded.

In February 2017, during clashes between Ahrar al-Sham, Hayat Tahrir al-Sham and the ISIL affiliated Jund al-Aqsa, the pro-opposition Syrian Observatory for Human Rights reported that Ajnad al-Sham came under attack from fighters from Jund al-Aqsa at their headquarters along with Saraya al-Ghuraba another Jihadist group, and during the attack, Jund al-Aqsa reportedly seized weapons and vehicles from Ajnad al-Sham and Saraya al-Ghuraba.

On 18 June 2017, after joining Hayat Tahrir al-Sham the group left HTS instead joining Ahrar al-Sham, before rejoining HTS later in November 2017.

== See also ==
- List of armed groups in the Syrian Civil War
