= Hassan Aboud =

Founder of Ahrar al-Sham

- حسان عبود
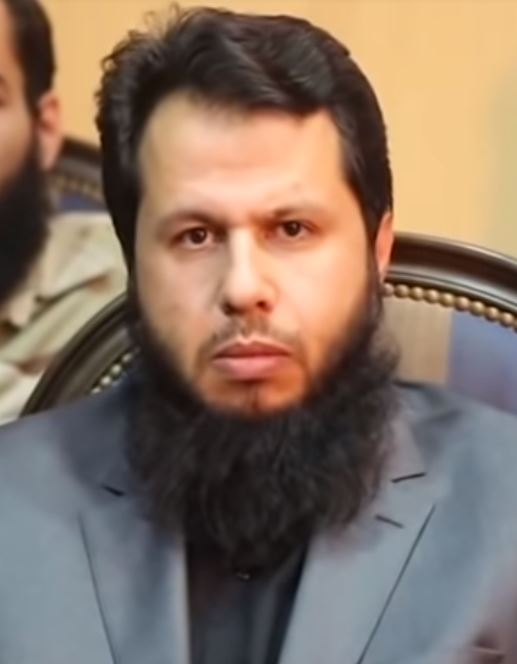
- Aboud in 2013

Emir of Ahrar al-Sham
- In office 2011–2014
- Preceded by: Position established
- Succeeded by: Hashim al-Sheikh

Personal details
- Born: 1979 Hama, Syria
- Died: 9 September 2014 (aged 34–35) Ram Hamdan, Idlib, Syria
- Nickname: Abu Abdullah al-Hamawi

Hassan Abboud (Arabic: حَسان عَبود, romanized: Ḥassān Abbūd), also known under his nom de guerre Abu Abdullah al-Hamawi, was a Syrian militant and political leader who was one of the founders of Ahrar al-Sham. He was part of its leadership until his death in September 2014.

== Biography ==
He was born in 1979 in Hama.

He was imprisoned in Sednaya Prison for four years between 2007 and 2011 until he was released as part of an amnesty following the commencement of uprisings in Syria.

He served as the head of the political council in the rebel union Islamic Front. German periodical Frankfurter Allgemeine Zeitung describes him as "one of the most important heads of the Syrian opposition against the government in Damascus".

In December 2013, he gave an interview to Al Jazeera's Sami Zeidan, in which he discussed his organisation's objectives and Syria's future. He stated that his group's ultimate aim was to establish an Islamic state in Syria, which represented the long suppressed aspiration of the Syrian people. Concerning the Geneva peace talks he stated that it did not represent his group, which had not participated therein, and that they viewed it as a plot to derail the Syrian Revolution from its objectives.

== Death ==
On 9 September 2014 he was killed along with 45 other rebel leaders in a bomb attack that targeted a secret meeting in an underground hideaway in Ram Hamdan, rural Northern Idlib. There are controversies around the nature and the perpetrators of the attack. Based on witnesses of the dead corpses, a sophisticated gas attack is suggested. Whereas some people mention a suicide bomber. The Islamic State (IS) has been forwarded responsible for the attack; however, some circles suggest the involvement of the United Arab Emirates. Others have speculated that his death may have been an accident in a weapons workshop in the complex he was in, or possible involvement from Western intelligence agencies, or that the attack was carried out by a rebel rival of Ahrar al-Sham.
