= Abu Yahia al-Hamawi =

Third leader of Ahrar al-Sham

- مهند المصري
- Born: Mohannad al-Masri; 1981 (age 44–45); Qalaat al-Madiq, Hama, Syria
- Military career
- Allegiance: Ahrar al-Sham
- Service years: 2011–2025
- Conflicts: Syrian Civil War

Mohannad al-Masri (Arabic: مهند المصري; born 1981), known by the alias Abu Yahia al-Hamawi, (Arabic: أبو يحيى الحموي; sometimes transliterated Abu Yahya al-Hamawi or Abu Yehya al-Hamawi) was the third leader of the Ahrar al-Sham during the Syrian Civil War. He served from 12 September 2015 until his term ended in November 2016.

== Biography ==
Al-Hamawi came from Qalaat al-Madiq, Hama, Syria. He trained as a civil engineer and studied at Tishreen University in Latakia. He was with Hadi al-Abdullah who was a journalist during the civil war. He was an activist and an inmate of the "Islamist wing" of the Syrian government’s main political prison in Sednaya from 2007 to 2011. An article in the Toronto Star described him as a "political prisoner". He was released in 2011, when the Syrian uprising began.

He later became leader of the Osama bin Zeid Company, a militia based around his hometown of Qalaat al-Madiq, and then rose through the ranks to become leader of Ahrar al-Sham in September 2015. According to Al-Monitor, the change is leadership is said to have made Ahrar Al-Sham "more palatable to the West" since al-Hamawi "is seen as someone who will fit the 'moderate Salafist' image Ahrar al-Sham wants to have". According to The Daily Beast, al-Hamawi claimed that "Ahrar al-Sham was mainstream and aligned with Western interests." In December 2015, al-Hamawi sent Labib al-Nahhas to Riyadh, Saudi Arabia in order to participate in the Saudi-led rebel conference that produced the High Negotiations Committee (HNC). Al-Hamawi has also falsely claimed that Al-Nusra had withdrawn from the Army of Conquest.

His term as leader could have been extended, but the Shura Council of Ahrar al-Sham appointed Ali al-Omar as leader in November 2016.
