= Ahrar al-Sham =

Syrian Islamist military and political organization

Harakat Ahrar al-Sham al-Islamiyyah
- حركة أحرار الشام الإسلامية
- Flag of Ahrar al-Sham Flag of Ahrar al-Sham (2013–2016) Variant of the logo of the Islamic Front used by Ahrar al-Sham
- Leaders: Hassan Aboud, nom de guerre Abu Abdullah al-Hamawi † (leader, 2011–2014); Hashim al-Sheikh, nom de guerre Abu Jaber Sheikh (leader, 2014–2015); Abu Yahia al-Hamawi (leader, 2015–2016); Ali al-Omar, nom de guerre Abu Ammar al-Omar (leader, 2016–July 2017 ); Hassan Soufan, nom de guerre Abu al-Bara (overall leader, 31 July 2017–August 2018); Jaber Ali Basha (leader, August 2018–January 9, 2021; deputy leader, 2017–2018); Amer al-Sheikh (leader, January 9, 2021–November 8, 2022, leader of the Amer faction, November 8, 2022–January 29, 2025); Yousef al-Hamwi (leader of the Yousef faction, November 8, 2022–?); Anas Abu Malek (deputy leader, 2017); Jamil Abu Abdul Rahman (northern sector commander, 2017)
- Spokesperson: Abu Yousef al-Mujajir (by 2016)
- Dates active: 2011–2013 (as Ahrar al-Sham Brigades); 2013–2025 (as Ahrar al-Sham Islamic Movement)
- Merger of: Kata’ib Ahrar Al-Sham (Note: In January 2013, the original Kata'ib Ahrar al-Sham officially expanded by absorbing several smaller Sunni Islamist rebel factions operating in northern and central Syria. This consolidation included Harakat Fajr Ash-Sham Al-Islamiya (The Islamic Dawn Movement in the Levant) based in Aleppo, Jama'at al-Tali'a al-Islamiyya (The Islamic Vanguard Group) from rural Idlib, and the Damascus-based Kata'ib al-Iman al-Muqatila (The Fighting Faith Brigades). Following the merger, the group lengthened its formal name from a collection of "brigades" into a unified movement, rebranding as Harakat Ahrar al-Sham al-Islamiyya (The Islamic Movement of Ahrar al-Sham) under the unified leadership of Hassan Aboud.)
- Headquarters: Babisqa, Idlib Governorate, Syria
- Active regions: Syria
- Ideology: Sunni Islamism; Salafism; Salafi jihadism (until 2015); Post-Salafi jihadism (2015-present); Syrian nationalism (officially since 21 June 2017, unofficially before); Factions: Salafi jihadism (2014-2016/2017)
- Status: Dissolved
- Size: 10,000–20,000 (July 2013); 16,000 (December 2016); 18,000–20,000 (March–June 2017)
- Part of: Syrian Islamic Front (2012–2013); Islamic Front (2013–2015); Mujahideen Shura Council (2014–2015); Syrian Revolutionary Command Council (2014–2015); Unified Military Command of Eastern Ghouta (2014–2015); Army of Conquest (2015–2017); Fatah Halab (2015–2017); Ansar al-Sharia (2015–early 2016); Jaysh Halab (2016) Syrian National Army: 3rd Legion; Levant Bloc; Levant Front (northern Aleppo branch, 2017–2025); National Front for Liberation (2018–2025): Syrian Liberation Front (2018–2025)
- Wars: Syrian Civil War: First Battle of Idlib (2012); Rojava conflict; Rojava–Islamist conflict; Battle of Aleppo; Battle of Raqqa (2013); 2013 Latakia offensive; Inter-rebel conflict during the Syrian Civil War; Al-Nusra Front–SRF/Hazzm Movement conflict; 2nd Idlib inter-rebel conflict (January–March 2017 2017); 2nd East Ghouta inter-rebel conflict (April–May 2017); 3rd Idlib inter-rebel conflict (July 2017); Syrian Liberation Front–Tahrir al-Sham conflict; Military intervention against IS; American-led intervention in Syria; Second Battle of Idlib; 2015 Jisr al-Shughur offensive; Daraa offensive (February 2017); Qaboun offensive (2017); Hama offensive (March–April 2017); Daraa offensive (June 2017); Northwestern Syria campaign (October 2017–February 2018); Battle of Harasta (2017–18); Beit Jinn offensive; Rif Dimashq offensive (February–April 2018); 2018 Southern Syria offensive; 2022 Ahrar al-Sham–Levant Front clashes; Northwestern Syria clashes (December 2022–November 2024); 2024 Syrian opposition offensives

Harakat Ahrar al-Sham al-Islamiyya (Arabic: حركة أحرار الشام الإسلامية, romanized: Ḥarakat Aḥrār aš-Šām al-Islāmiyah, lit. 'Islamic Movement of the Freemen of the Levant'), commonly referred to as Ahrar al-Sham, was a coalition of multiple Sunni Islamist units that coalesced into a single brigade and later a division in order to fight against the Ba'athist regime led by Bashar al-Assad during the Syrian Civil War. Ahrar al-Sham was led by Hassan Aboud until his death in 2014. In July 2013, Ahrar al-Sham had 10,000 to 20,000 fighters, which at the time made it the second most powerful unit fighting against al-Assad, after the Free Syrian Army. It was the principal organization operating under the umbrella of the Syrian Islamic Front and was a major component of the Islamic Front. With an estimated 20,000 fighters in 2015, Ahrar al-Sham became the largest rebel group in Syria after the Free Syrian Army became less powerful. Ahrar al-Sham and Jaysh al-Islam were the main rebel groups supported by Turkey. On 18 February 2018, Ahrar al-Sham merged with the Nour al-Din al-Zenki Movement to form the Syrian Liberation Front.

The group aims to create an Islamic state under Sharia law. While both are major rebel groups, Ahrar al-Sham is not to be confused with Tahrir al-Sham, its main rival and former ally. Before 2016, Ahrar al-Sham allied with the al-Nusra Front, a now-defunct affiliate of al-Qaeda. From 2017 onward, it increasingly fought against Tahrir al-Sham, an Islamic coalition formed under the initiative of a former Ahrar leader, Abu Jaber Sheikh; through a merger of Ahrar al-Sham's Jaysh al-Ahrar faction, Jabhat Fatah al-Sham, Nur al-Din Zenki and other militia groups.

At the Syrian Revolution Victory Conference, which was held on 29 January 2025, most factions of the armed opposition, including Ahrar al-Sham, announced their dissolution and were incorporated into the newly formed Ministry of Defense.

== Kata’ib Ahrar Al-Sham ==
Kat’aib Ahrar Al-Sham Ahrar Al-Sham Brigades
- كتائب أحرار الشام
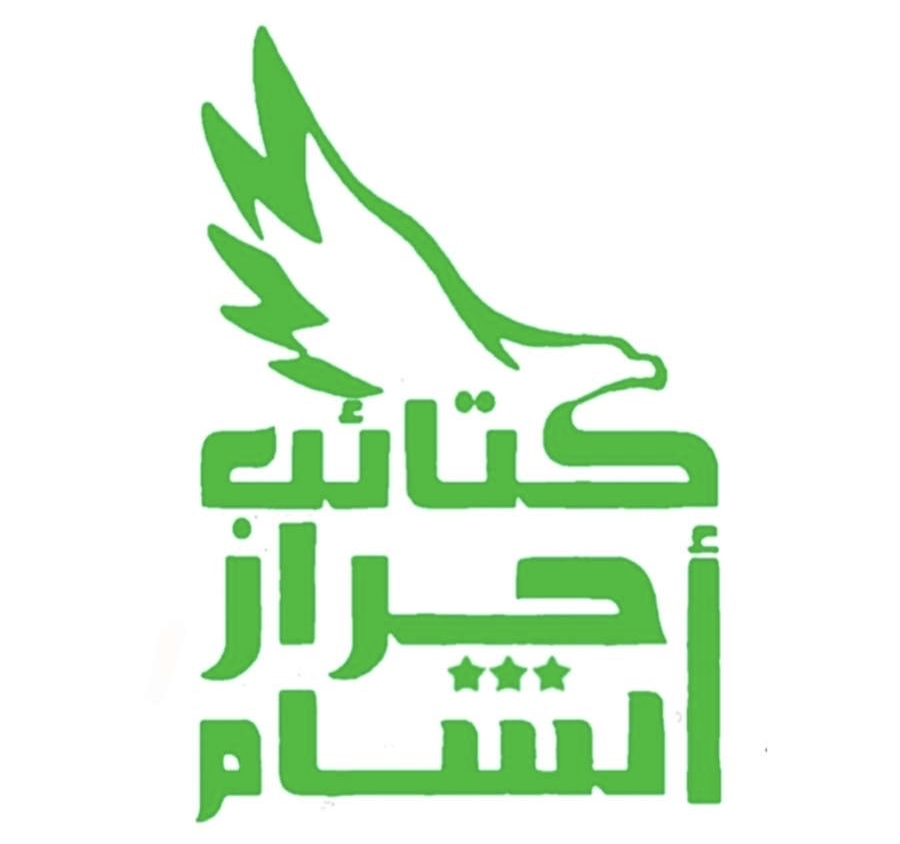
- Leaders: Hassan Aboud, nom de guerre Abu Abdullah al-Hamawi; Abu Khalid Al-Suri
- Founded: June 2011; Officially December 2011
- Dates active: June 11, 2011-January 2013
- Country: Syria
- Ideology: Sunni Islamism; Salafism; Salafi jihadism
- Part of: Syrian Islamic Front (2012)
- Wars: Syrian Civil War; First Battle of Idlib; Idlib Governorate clashes (September 2011 – March 2012); Idlib Governorate clashes (June 2012 – April 2013); Rif Dimashq clashes (November 2011–March 2012); Al-Qusayr offensive; 2012 Aleppo Governorate clashes
- Website: WWW.Ahraralsham.com (inactive)

Kata'ib Ahrar al-Sham was officially formed in December 2011.

While its founding members—primarily Sunni Islamist political prisoners released from the Saidnaya military prison—began organizing secret revolutionary cells in the Idlib and Hama governorates around June 2011, the group did not publicly announce its formation or operational existence as an armed brigade until later that winter.

Kata'ib Ahrar al-Sham (the Battalions of the Free Men of Syria) was the foundational Sunni Islamist rebel brigade that later expanded into Harakat Ahrar al-Sham al-Islamiyya. It operated as one of the largest and most powerful armed opposition forces fighting against the Bashar al-Assad regime during the Syrian Civil War, until its official dissolution on January 29, 2025.

== Ideology ==
Ahrar al-Sham has defined itself in this way:

The Islamic Movement of the Free Men of the Levant is an Islamist, reformist, innovative and comprehensive movement. It is integrated with the Islamic Front and is a comprehensive and Islamic military, political and social formation. It aims to completely overthrow the Assad regime in Syria and build an Islamic state whose only sovereign, reference, ruler, direction, and individual, societal and nationwide unifier is Allah Almighty's Sharia (law).

In its first audio address, Ahrar al-Sham stated its goal was to replace the Assad government with a Sunni Islamic state. It acknowledged the need to take into account the population's current state of mind. It also described the uprising as a jihad against a Safawi (Iranian Shi'ite) plot to spread Shia Islam and establish a Shia state from Iran through Iraq and Syria, extending to Lebanon and Palestine.

Newspaper The New Arab argued that "Ahrar Al-Sham started as a Syrian Salafi jihadist group in late 2011". This view was shared by Wilson Center researcher Ali El Yassir who stated that the group had "unambiguously espoused a Salafi and Jihadi discourse when it was created". Researcher Hassan Hassan similarly stated that "Salafi-jihadism [was] the movement to which its top echelon once subscribed". According to the International Crisis Group in 2012, Ahrar al-Sham, along with the more extreme al-Nusra Front, had "embraced the language of jihad and called for an Islamic state based on Salafi principles." Around the same time, Institute for the Study of War researcher Elizabeth O'Bagy stated that Ahrar al-Sham consisted of "conservative Islamist, and often Salafist, member units" and also included "many Salafi-jihadists". She further paralleled the group's ideology to that of the Fighting Vanguard, an older Syrian Islamist militant faction. According to US intelligence officials, a few al-Qaeda members released from prisons by the Syrian government have been able to influence actions of the group, and install operatives within the senior ranks of Ahrar al-Sham. Such ties were not disclosed publicly until January 2014, when Abu Khalid al-Suri, a senior leader of Ahrar al-Sham and its emir in Aleppo at the time, acknowledged his long-time membership in al-Qaeda (A veteran of the Afghanistan war) and role as Ayman al-Zawahiri's representative in the Levant.

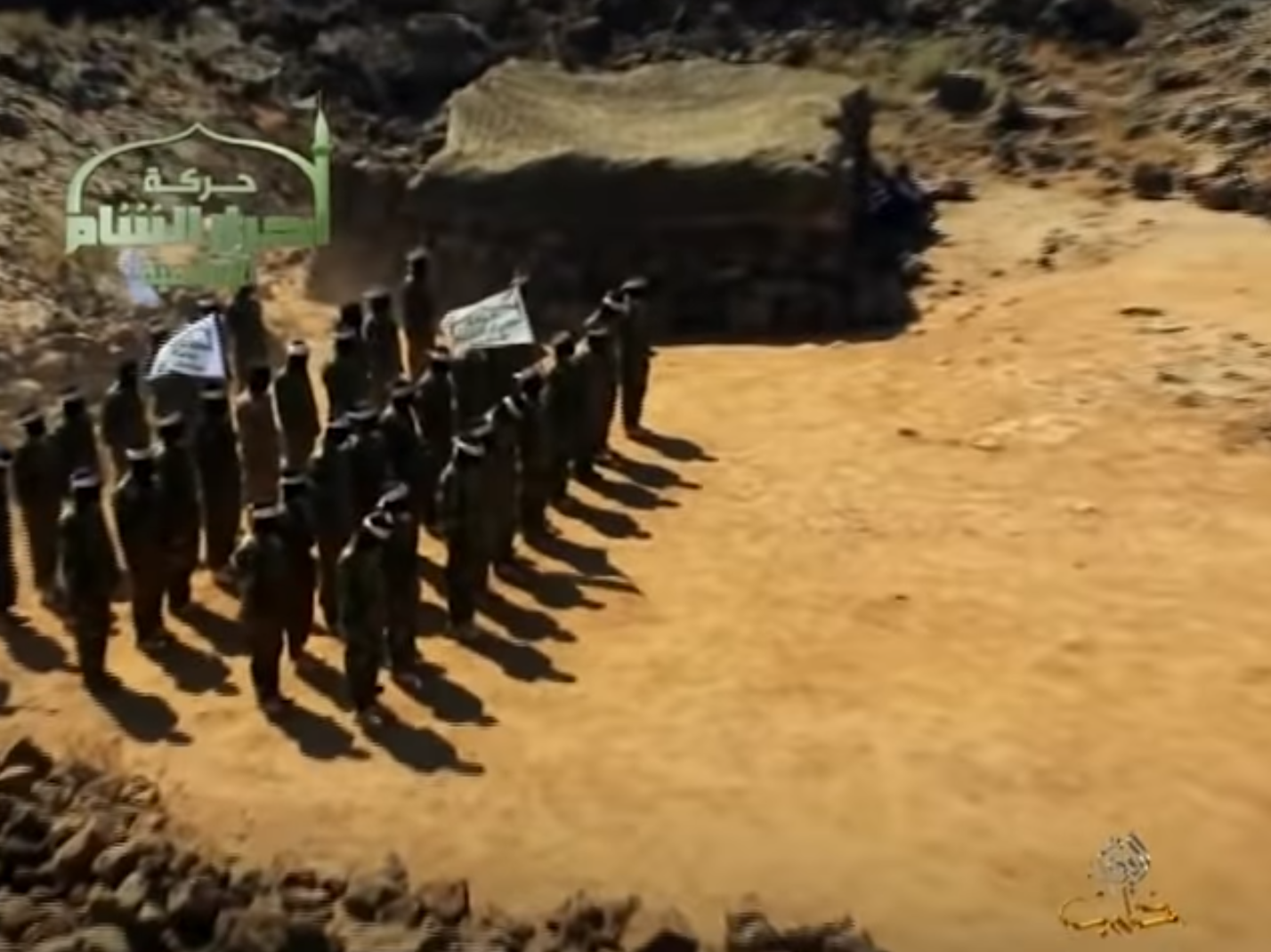
Ahrar al-Sham fighters on parade

However, Ahrar al-Sham had a Syrian leadership which "emphasize[d] that its campaign is for Syria, not for a global jihad". In general, the group did not advertise its most extreme ideological elements, and was willing to cooperate with secular Syrian rebel factions. Some scholars have argued for Ahrar al-Sham to be noted as a "nationalist jihadist salafi" group. The goal of regime change can be seen in Ahrar al-Sham's involvement in the conflict in Syria. Ahrar al-Sham has joined forces with other groups in the conflict in their opposition to the Assad regime in Syria.

In 2014, regional expert Aymenn Jawad Al-Tamimi has speculated two factions existed within Ahrar al-Sham, a nationalist moderate faction and a hardline jihadist faction influenced largely by Abu Khalid al-Suri whom was appointed by Ayman al-Zawahiri to act as a mediator between Jabhat al-Nusra and the Islamic State of Iraq and the Levant (ISIL), the faction at the time mostly existing in eastern Syria, in particular in Hasakah and having a pro-Caliphate outlook, that allied with ISIL and held ties with Ansar al-Islam with a number of Ahrar al-Sham members later joining ISIL during the group's presence there. In this year, the group experienced disputes about its ideology and aims, resulting in a drift away from Salafist jihadism and toward a localized form of jihadism as well as Syrian nationalism.

In 2015, researcher Sam Heller interviewed several Ahrar al-Sham commanders who stated that the group had initially been "something close to 'Salafi-jihadist', though "the group as a whole subsequently diverged from 'Salafi-jihadism'". Instead, Ahrar al-Sham had reportedly begun to espouse "revisionist jihadism" or "post-Salafi-jihadism"; this belief system argued that global jihadism in the tradition of al-Qaeda and IS was doomed to fail, and instead argued for a "jihad that balances between the ideological leadership of an elite vanguard and populist energy". According to Heller, the group's drift away from Salafist jihadism had mainly taken place in 2014, as the group had begun to oppose the Islamic State which espouses Salafist jihadism. In August 2015, Ahrar al-Sham commander Eyad Shaar said "We are part of Syrian society and the international community. ... We want to be part of the solution." Ahrar al-Sham's political representative stated in December 2015 that Ahrar al-Sham are "not related with al Qaeda, we only fight with them against Assad and ISIS".

In May 2016, Ahrar al-Sham released an address by then deputy general director Ali al-Omar in which he distinguished Ahrar al-Sham's militancy from the Salafi jihadism of al-Qaeda and IS, and defended its political engagement. During al-Omar's address, he stated that Ahrar al-Sham was a new school of Islamism born out of three other currents created after the fall of the Ottoman Empire, those currents being political organizations such as the Muslim Brotherhood, prostelyzation movements like the Tablighi Jamaat, and the general Jihadist movement, and that Ahrar al-Sham combines elements of these currents into its own methodology and practices establishing it as a new school of Islamism. However, various ideological factions peristed within Ahrar al-Sham; hardliners still dominated the group's Sharia office and military wing, while more moderate pragmatists controlled the political office. At this point, researcher Hassan Hassan also voiced doubts about the extent to which Ahrar al-Sham had actually drifted away from Salafist jihadism, as the group's writings (distributed in training camps) was still Salafi jihadist in nature. As a result of the continuing disputes within the group, a faction called "Jaysh al-Ahrar" headed by Abu Jaber Sheikh, a senior commander in Ahrar al-Sham, split from the group and joined Hayat Tahrir al-Sham. Jaysh al-Ahrar later left HTS due to disagreements with the leadership and the resignation of the Saudi cleric Abdullah al-Muhaysini, and went on to join the National Front for Liberation alongside Ahrar al-Sham in 2018.

The Syrian independence flag, a symbol for Syrian nationalism, is used by some Ahrar al-Sham factions

Ahrar al-Sham leader Hassan Aboud stated that Ahrar al-Sham worked with the Nusra Front and would have no problems with al-Nusra as long as they continued fighting the regime. Aboud also said Ahrar worked with the Islamic State of Iraq and the Levant (ISIL) in some battles, but that their agenda was disagreeable. He said all parties, whether they were ISIL, al-Nusra, the Islamic Front, or the FSA, shared the same objective of establishing an Islamic state, but they differed as to the "tactics, strategies or methods". Aboud claimed that in Syria "there are no secular groups".

Ahrar al-Sham, and the Islamic Front in general, issued condolences for Afghan Taliban leader Mullah Omar upon his death.

In February 2015, after the Charlie Hebdo shooting carried out by individuals linked to al-Qaeda in the Arabian Peninsula, a pro-opposition newspaper printed papers with the Je Suis Charlie slogan as well as a tribute to those who were killed in the attack, which was viewed as anti-Islamic by Ahrar al-Sham and some members were filmed burning copies of the newspaper with "Je Suis Charlie" printed on it, the newspaper's writers responded by saying the publication was taken out of context.

On 21 June 2017, the group issued a fatwa permitting it to display the Syrian independence flag.

=== Governance ===
During the group's existence, it has administered localities under its control including areas in the Raqqa Governorate, the Deir ez-Zor Governorate and elsewhere in Syria. Ahrar al-Sham also held strong ties to Syria's Arab tribes in the south and recruited several tribesmen from southern Syria into the group.

In 2013, during the opposition's offensive in Raqqa, Ahrar al-Sham established a local affiliate known as Brigade of the Trustees of Raqqa, the brigade acted as a law enforcement unit in Raqqa and cooperated with local Islamic courts in enforcing Sharia law, and reportedly beat an individual in the city per the ruling of a local court. The brigade also took part in humanitarian activities such as food distribution to locals.

An internal faction of Ahrar al-Sham, known as the Ashidaa Mujahideen Brigade, led by Abu al-Abd Ashidaa had flogged individuals for not attending Friday prayers.

In an Amnesty International report in July 2016, Ahrar al-Sham, along with al-Nusra Front, was described as having "applied a strict interpretation of Shari'a and imposed punishments amounting to torture or other ill-treatment for perceived infractions." A political activist was abducted and detained by Ahrar al-Sham for having not worn a veil and accused of affiliation with the Syrian government. At least three children have been recorded to be abducted by Jabhat al-Nusra and Ahrar al-Sham between 2012 and 2015. Lawyers and political activists have faced reprisal attacks by Ahrar al-Sham and other Islamist rebel groups due to their political activities and perceived religious beliefs. Mohamed Najeeb Bannan, an Islamic Front Sharia Court judge in Aleppo, stated, "The legal reference is the Islamic Sharia. The cases are different, from robberies to drug use, to moral crimes. It's our duty to look at any crime that comes to us. ... After the regime has fallen, we believe that the Muslim majority in Syria will ask for an Islamic state. Of course, it's very important to point out that some say the Islamic Sharia will cut off people's hands and heads, but it only applies to criminals. And to start off by killing, crucifying etc. That is not correct at all." In response to being asked what the difference between the Islamic Front's and the Islamic State's version of sharia would be, he said "One of their mistakes is before the regime has fallen, and before they've established what in Sharia is called Tamkeen [having a stable state], they started applying Sharia, thinking God gave them permission to control the land and establish a Caliphate. This goes against the beliefs of religious scholars around the world. This is what [IS] did wrong. This is going to cause a lot of trouble. Anyone who opposes [IS] will be considered against Sharia and will be severely punished." On 18 June 2017, Ahrar al-Sham adopted Unified Arab Law in its courts in Syria.

Ahrar al-Sham has claimed that it only targets government forces and militia and that it has cancelled several operations due to fear of civilian casualties. It provides humanitarian services and relief to local communities, in addition to pamphlets promoting religious commitment in daily life.

== History ==
=== Formation and early activities ===
Salafi groups emerged as important political and social actors in Egypt and Tunisia after the Arab Spring. Salafist groups can look very different from each other but author Markus Holdo identifies three accepted categories of Salafist groups. There are scripturalist Salafis who refuse to participate in politics because they find it useless in achieving their goals, the political Salafist who do engage in politics while seeking to put in place a fundamentalist agenda, and lastly there are the Jihadist Salafis who identify as part of a global jihad and generally find more popularity among younger people. While there may be differences in how Jihadist Salafist groups define the act of jihad, they generally reject the institutional politics of liberal democracy and westernization because "of its inability to deliver the material and ethical goods they demand." Jihadist Salafist do not just rally behind a shared religious view, but around fighting the ideals they think exist in institutional politics such as hierarchy, exclusion, and corruption. Ahrar al-Sham can be described as Jihadist Salafis whose definition of Jihad is one of active war fighting. Often, this view of Jihad is used as a recruitment tool by calling fighters to join a cause and complete their duty to Islam.

Ahrar al-Sham started forming units just after the Egyptian revolution of January 2011, and before the Syrian uprising started in March 2011. Most of the group's founders were Salafist political prisoners who had been detained for years at the Sednaya prison until they were released as part of an amnesty by the Syrian Government in March–May 2011. At the time of its establishment in December 2011, Ahrar al-Sham consisted of about 25 rebel units spread across Syria. On 23 January 2012, the Ahrar al-Sham Battalions was officially announced in the Idlib Governorate. In the same announcement, the group claimed responsibility for an attack on the security headquarters in the city of Idlib. "To all the free people of Syria, we announce the formation of the Free Ones of the Levant Battalions," the statement said, according to a translation obtained by the Long War Journal. "We promise God, and then we promise you, that we will be a firm shield and a striking hand to repel the attacks of this criminal Al Assad army with all the might we can muster. We promise to protect the lives of civilians and their possessions from security and the Shabiha [pro-government] militia. We are a people who will either gain victory or die."

By July 2012, the group's website listed 50 units, and by mid-January 2013, the number had increased to 83 units. Most of these units are headquartered in villages in Idlib Governorate, but many others are located in Hama and Aleppo Governorates. Some Ahrar al-Sham units that have been involved in heavy fighting include the Qawafel al-Shuhada and Ansar al-Haqq Brigades (both in Khan Shaykhun), the al-Tawhid wal-Iman Brigade (Maarat al-Nu'man, Idlib), the Shahba Brigade (Aleppo City), the Hassane bin Thabet Brigade (Darat Izza, Aleppo), and the Salahaddin and Abul-Fida Brigades (both in Hama City).

Members of the group are Sunni Islamists. Ahrar al-Sham cooperates with the Free Syrian Army; however, it does not maintain ties with the Syrian National Council. Although they coordinate with other groups, they maintain their own strict and secretive leadership, receiving the majority of their funding and support from donors in Kuwait.

Ahrar al-Sham was credited for rescuing NBC News team including reporter Richard Engel, producer Ghazi Balkiz, cameraman John Kooistra and others after they were kidnapped in December 2012. While Engel initially blamed pro-Assad Shabiha militants for the abduction, it later turned out that they were "almost certainly" abducted by an FSA affiliated rebel group. There were around 500 people in Ahrar al-Sham in August 2012.

=== 2013–2014: The Islamic Front ===
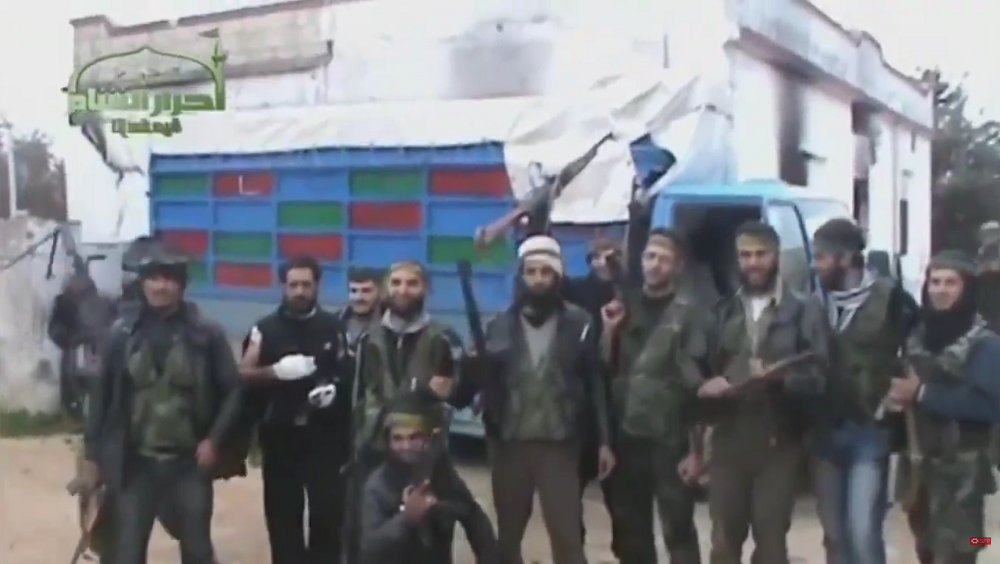
Ahrar al-Sham fighters in a village in Hama Governorate, March 2013

Ahrar al-Sham BM-21 Grad launch during the 2014 Latakia offensive

In December 2012, a new umbrella organization was announced, called the Syrian Islamic Front, consisting of 11 Islamist rebel organizations. Ahrar al-Sham was the most prominent of these, and a member of Ahrar al-Sham's, Abu 'Abd Al-Rahman Al-Suri (aka Abdulrahman Al Soory), served as the Front's spokesman.

In January 2013, several of the member organizations of the Syrian Islamic Front announced that they were joining forces with Ahrar al-Sham into a broader group called Harakat Ahrar al-Sham al-Islamiyya (The Islamic Movement of Ahrar al-Sham).

In May 2013, Ahrar al-Sham alongside Al-Nusra, ISIL, and the Tawhid Brigade fought the Ghuraba al-Sham Front because of looting and corruption on behalf of Ghuraba al-Sham as well as disputes Ghuraba al-Sham had with the Aleppo Sharia Court.

In September 2013, members of ISIL killed the Ahrar al-Sham commander Abu Obeida Al-Binnishi, after he had intervened to protect a Malaysian Islamic charity; ISIL had mistaken its Malaysian flag for that of the United States.

In August 2013, members of the brigade uploaded a video of their downing of a Syrian Air Force MiG-21 over the Latakia province with a Chinese-made FN-6 MANPADS, apparently becoming the first recorded kill with such a weapon.

In mid-November 2013, after the Battle for Brigade 80 near the Aleppo International Airport, fighters from the Islamic State of Iraq and the Levant beheaded a commander of Ahrar al-Sham forces, mistaking him for an Iraqi Shiite pro-government militiaman.

In November 2013, the SIF announced that it was dissolving, and that its components would henceforth operate as part of the newly formed Islamic Front.

In December 2013, there were reports of fighting between ISIL and another Islamic rebel group in the town of Maskana, Aleppo; activists reported that the Islamic rebel group was identified as Ahrar al-Sham.

=== 2014–2016: shifting alliances with rebels and Islamists ===
On 23 February 2014, one of the groups top commanders, Abu Khalid al-Suri, who also served as an al-Qaeda representative, was killed in a suicide bombing in Aleppo, organized by ISIL. In March 2015, the Suqour al-Sham Brigade merged with Ahrar al-Sham, but left in September 2016. Later in September, Suqour al-Sham joined the Army of Conquest, a group which also has Ahrar al-Sham as a member.

==== September 2014: leadership killed in bomb attack ====
On 9 September 2014, a bomb went off during a high-level meeting in Idlib province, killing Hassan Abboud, the leader of the group, and 27 other senior commanders, including military field commanders, members of the group's Shura council, and leaders of allied brigades. There was no claim of responsibility for the attack. The day after the bombing Abu Jaber was announced as replacement leader. Ahrar ash-Sham received condolences from the al-Qaeda organization Nusra. Ahrar received condolences from other al-Qaeda members.

Name	Function	Alias	Notes
Hassane Abboud	Head of the Political Bureau of the Islamic Front	Abu Abdullah al-Hamawi	
Abu Yazen al-Shami			Had founded the Aleppo-based Fajr al-Islam
Abu Talha al-Ghab	a top military commander		
Abu Abdulmalek al-Sharei	Head of the Islamic Sharia Council of the Islamic Front		
Abu Ayman Al-Hamwi			
Abu Ayman Ram Hamdan			
Abu Sariya al-Shami	Ideologue		
Muhibbeddin al-Shami			
Abu Yusuf Binnish			
Talal al-AhmadTammam			
Abul-Zubeir al-Hamawi	Ahrar leader in Hama		
Abu Hamza al-Raqqa			Had founded the Aleppo-based Fajr al-Islam
several other leaders			

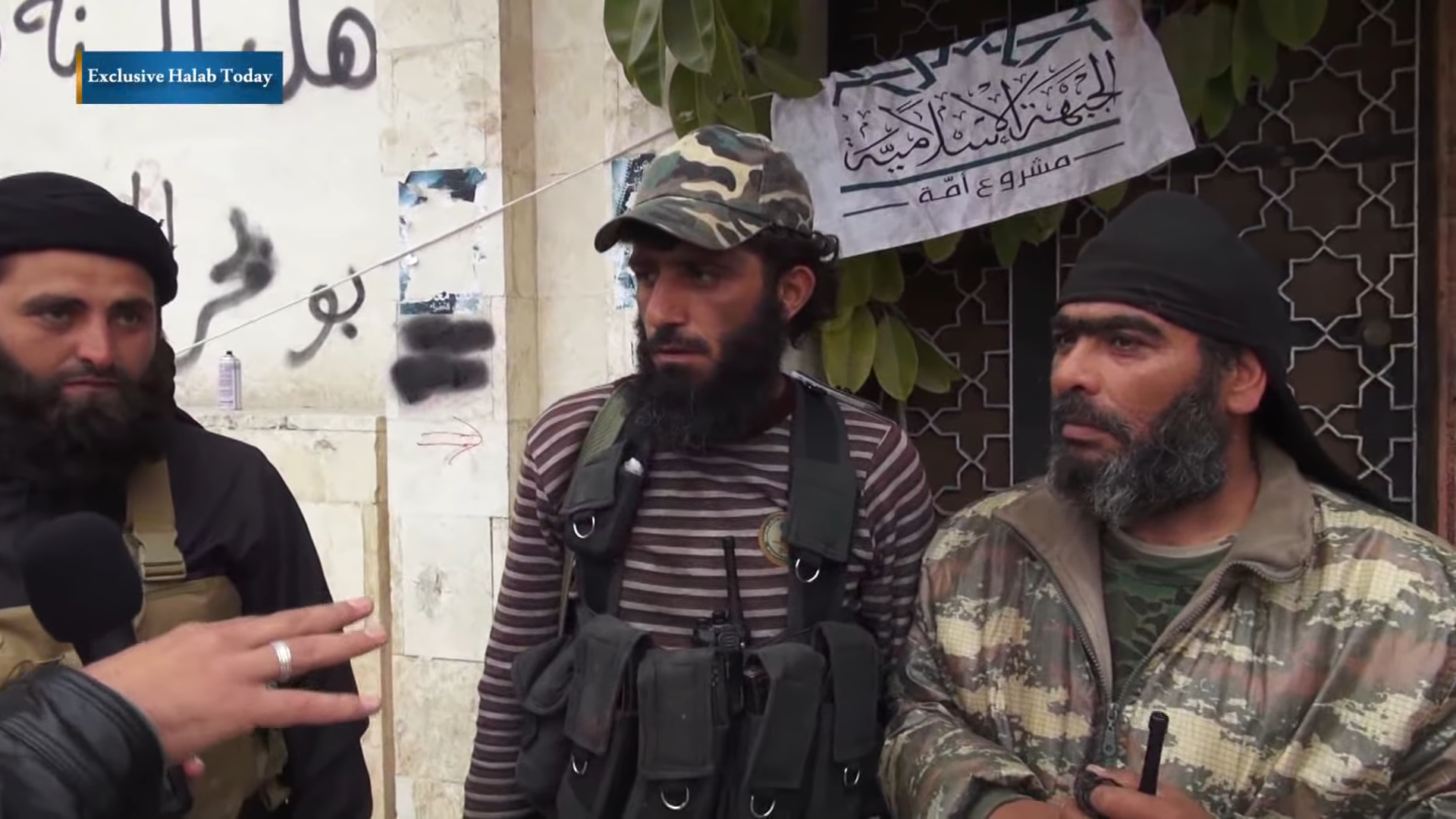
Ahrar al-Sham field commanders in Idlib after they participated in the battle to capture the city, 30 March 2015

In early November 2014, representatives from Ahrar al-Sham reportedly attended a meeting with al-Nusra Front, the Khorasan Group, the Islamic State of Iraq and the Levant, and Jund al-Aqsa, which sought to unite the groups against the Syrian government. However, by 14 November 2014, it was reported that the negotiations had failed.

During the night of 6 November 2014, a US airstrike targeted the group for the first time, hitting its headquarters in Idlib governorate and killing Abu al-Nasr, who was in charge of receiving weapons for the group. On 24 November 2014, a US airstrike on the IS headquarters building in Ma'dan, Raqqa, killed another Ahrar al-Sham fighter, who was being held prisoner by IS.

The New York Times reported that the pro Al-Qaeda Saudi cleric Abdullah Al-Muhaisini ordered that Christians in Idlib were not to be killed, and that Christians were being defended by Ahrar al-Sham. However, according to Middle East Christian News, there were subsequent unconfirmed reports from the Assyrian Observatory for Human Rights of Ahrar al-Sham executing two Christians in the city.

On 26 April 2015, Ahrar al-Sham, along with other major Aleppo based groups, established the Fatah Halab joint operations room.

On 14 July 2015, two suicide bombers blew themselves up at an Ahrar al-Sham Movement headquarters killing Abu Abdul Rahman Salqeen (an Ahrar al-Sham leader) and 5-6 others in Idlib province.

Mohannad al-Masri, known by the alias Abu Yahia al-Hamawi, was appointed leader in September 2015. Ali al-Omar, known by the alias Abu Ammar al-Omar, was appointed leader in November 2016.

In October 2015, Abu Amara Brigades left the Levant Front, which they had joined in February 2015, and joined Ahrar al-Sham.

On 21 October 2015, the Jund al Malahim operations room was created as an alliance of Ajnad al Sham, Ahrar al-Sham and Al-Nusra in Rif Dimashq.

On 25 February 2016, a car bomb was detonated at the Russian military base in Idlib, Syria. Ahrar al-Sham claimed responsibility on their website alleging "dozens" of casualties among Russian officials. On the following day, Jaysh al-Sunna's branch in Hama merged with Ahrar al-Sham, though its northern Aleppo branch was not a part of this merger.

On 13 May 2016, Amnesty International named Ahrar al-Sham as one of the groups responsible for "repeated indiscriminate attacks that may amount to war crimes" and reported allegations of their use of chemical weapons. On 12 May 2016, Al-Nusra Front fighters attacked and captured the Alawite village of Zara'a, Southern Hama Governorate. Pro-government media reported that Ahrar al-Sham fighters were involved. The Syrian Observatory for Human Rights confirmed that civilians had been kidnapped and the Red Crescent reportedly confirmed that 42 civilians and seven National Defence Force (pro-government militia) fighters were killed during the militant attack. Additionally, some pro-Syrian government news sources reported that around 70 civilians, including women and children were kidnapped and taken to Al-Rastan Plains. Some of the captured were pro-government soldiers.

In September 2016, Ashida'a Mujahideen Brigade left Ahrar al-Sham, apparently due to Ahrar's support of Turkey's Operation Euphrates Shield and lack of willingness to be closer to al-Nusra Front.

Ahrar al-Sham was praised by Tawfiq Shahabuddin, leader of the Nour al-Din al-Zenki Movement, in October 2016.

On 10 December 2016, 16 Ahrar al-Sham units under Hashim al-Sheikh, known by the alias Abu Jaber, formed a quasi-independent group within Ahrar called Jaysh al-Ahrar, or the Free Army, for similar reasons as Ashida'a Mujahideen Brigade leaving 3 months prior.

Syrian Civil War battles and offensives

In September 2015: In collaboration with Jabhat al-Nusra, Ahrar al-Sham overtook an Assad regime stronghold, the Abu al-Zuhur military air base in Idlib governorate.

Autumn 2015: In alliance with Jabhat al-Nusra, Ahrar al-Sham was involved in offensives in Northern Aleppo against ISIS and in Southern Aleppo against Assad regime forces.

May and June 2016: Allied with Jabhat al-Nusra, they conducted attacks in Northern Aleppo against ISIS that initially made rapid advances but were eventually pushed back.

Spring 2016: Ahrar al-Sham was involved in heavy fighting with other Anti-ISIS rebel forces in Eastern and Western Ghouta and in the Dar'a region in southern Syria.

June 2016: In alliance with Jabhat al-Nusra and others, major offensive against Assad regime forces in Jabal al-Akrad.

=== 2017: conflict with HTS ===
On 21 January 2017, four factions from Ahrar reportedly left in order to form a coalition known as Tahrir al-Sham: al-Bara, Dhu Nurayn, al-Sawa'iq and Usud al-Har Battalion.

On 23 January 2017, the Jabhat Fatḥ al-Sham attacked Jabhat Ahl al-Sham bases in Atarib and other towns in western Aleppo. All the bases were captured and by 24 January, the group was defeated and joined Ahrar al-Sham.

On 25 January 2017, several factions from Jaysh al-Islam based in Aleppo left to join Ahrar, establishing the Ansar Regiment. On the same day, the remaining Fastaqim Union members of its Aleppo branch joined Ahrar al-Sham.

On 25 January 2017, Suqour al-Sham Brigade along with the Idlib branch of Jaysh al-Islam and the Aleppo branch of the Levant Front joined Ahrar al-Sham. On the following day, al-Miiqdad Brigade also joined Ahrar.

On 4 February 2017, American aircraft killed an Egyptian al-Qaeda member, Abu Hani al-Masri. He was killed in Idlib's Sarmada region by a drone strike. Egyptian Islamic Jihad was co-created by him. Thomas Joscelyn pointed out that the publication al-Masra of al-Qaeda in the Arabian Peninsula talked about Abu Hani al-Masri. He was also a military commander in Ahrar ash-Sham. In Egypt he was jailed for several years and he was in Chechnya, Bosnia, Afghanistan, and Somalia. In 2012 he was released from prison in Egypt. In Chechnya, several Russian prisoners once appeared in a video with Abu Hani al-Masri.

Jaber Ali Basha and Anas Abu Malek were made deputy leaders of Ahrar al-Sham in February 2017.

On 31 July 2017, Hassan Soufan, also known by his nom de guerre "Abu al-Bara", was appointed as the leader of Ahrar al-Sham's shura council. Soufan was born in Latakia, and in 2004, Saudi Arabia extradited him to the Syrian government, which sentenced him to life imprisonment in Sednaya Prison. In December 2016, he was released as part of an agreement during which the rebels withdrew from Aleppo. Soufan was among those who temporarily split from Ahrar al-Sham as part of Jaysh al-Ahrar in the same month.

On 6 August 2017, 120 Ahrar al-Sham fighters in Arbin, Eastern Ghouta defected to the al-Rahman Legion after internal disputes. Ahrar al-Sham accused the Rahman Legion of seizing their weapons, while the Rahman Legion accused Ahrar al-Sham of their attempt to implement their "failed" experience from northern Syria in eastern Ghouta. A ceasefire agreement between the Rahman Legion and Ahrar al-Sham was implemented on 9 August.

In August 2018, Hassan Soufan resigned as leader and deputy leader Jaber Ali Basha was promoted to replace him.

On 22 June 2018, an Ahrar al-Sham commander was assassinated in al-Bab by gunmen believed to be part of the Hamza Division.

Around 2,000 fighters in Ahrar al-Sham came from Hama. After its defeat in Idlib by Tahrir al-Sham in July 2017, territorial control by Ahrar al-Sham are confined to the al-Ghab Plain, Mount Zawiya, Ariha, and a number of villages in the northeastern Latakia Governorate and the western Aleppo Governorate. Eventually, Ahrar al-Sham gained a presence on equal grounds within the Idlib area, as the conflict lessened its intensity during the Syrian Salvation Government with the Fateh al-Mubin Operations Room consolidating military power.

=== 2024-2025: Operation Deterrence of Aggression, dissolution ===
Ahrar al-Sham participated in the Operation Deterrence of Aggression which began on November 27, 2024, as part of the National Front for Liberation.

On the 29th of January 2025, during the Conference for Announcing the Victory of the Syrian Revolution, Ahrar al-Sham declared its dissolution and merged into the Syrian Armed Forces.

Certain generals of Ahrar al-Sham now serve as generals within divisions of the Syrian Armed Forces.

== Capabilities and tactics ==
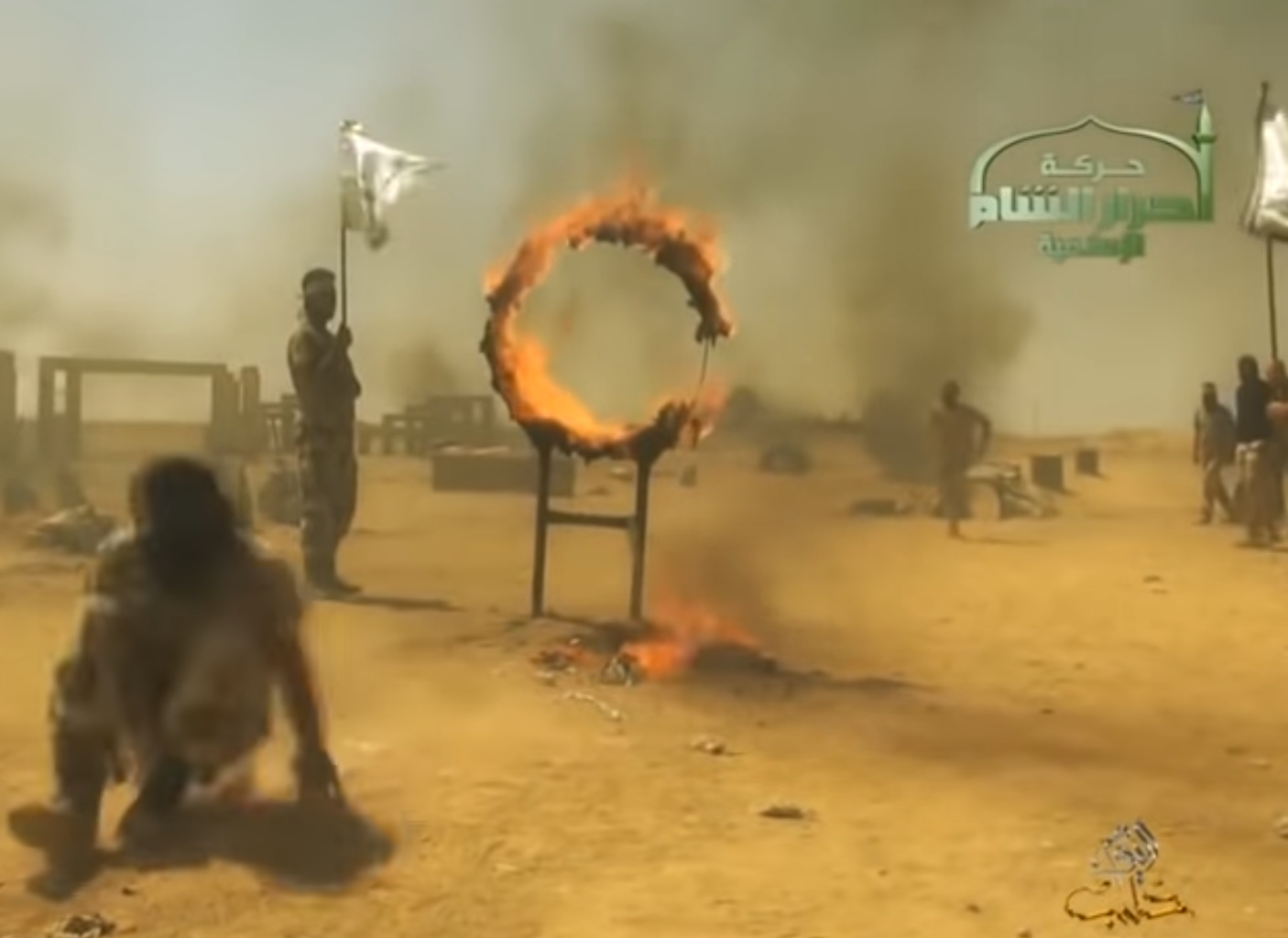
Ahrar al-Sham fighters train by jumping through a burning ring

Ahrar al-Sham is one of the best-armed and most powerful rebel factions active in the Syrian Civil War. It progressed from the use of improvised explosive devices and small-arms ambushes in early 2012 to assuming a lead role in large-scale sustained assaults on multiple fronts by 2013. The capture of materiel from the Syrian Armed Forces enabled Ahrar to regularly deploy tanks and mobile artillery and anti-tank guided missiles. It occasionally employed 1990s-era Croatian rocket and grenade launchers. Ahrar al Sham was involved in every major rebel victory over Syrian Government forces between September 2012 and mid-2013. Ahrar grew significantly by absorbing into its ranks other rebel factions from the Islamic Front and the Syrian Islamic Front which preceded it.

As of 2016, Ahrar al-Sham had between 10,000 and 20,000 members. When Ahrar al-Sham cooperated with Jabhat al-Nusra, it had a force strong enough for military offensives that gained control of territory and pushed back Assad forces and the Islamic State. Aside from large scale offensives, Ahrar al-Sham was known for its use of Improvised Explosive Devices (IEDs) and a tactic in which they would target military bases and capture weapons. Ahrar al-Sham even has a technical division devoted to cyber attacks. There is one confirmed report of Ahrar al-Sham using a SVBIED and it associates with groups who do.

== Foreign support ==
Discussions about foreign support in the media often center on the weapons that foreign powers provide to their proxies. Money is just as important as weapons though. As soon as a soldier / rebel has to fight away from his home, the rebel group has to pay at least his sustenance, and in practice some more. For Ahrar the amount of financial aid it got from abroad might be the very reason it became so powerful. After the December 2013 suspension of all U.S. and the U.K. non-lethal support, which included medicine, vehicles, and communications equipment, to the Free Syrian Army after the Islamic Front, a coalition of Islamist fighters that broke with the American-backed Free Syrian Army, had seized warehouses of equipment. In 2014 the U.S. was considering indirectly resuming non-lethal aid to the moderate opposition by having it "funneled exclusively through the Supreme Military Council, the military wing of moderate, secular Syrian opposition" even if some of it ends up going to Islamist groups. Several European states have attempted small-level engagements with individual Ahrar al-Sham political officials in Turkey.

Ahrar al-Sham generally welcomes foreign fighters without demanding too much of them. Ahrar al-Sham encourages foreign fighters to arrive unmarried, committed to stay with the organization for six months, and prepared to pay in advance for their stay and their own weapon. While Ahrar al-Sham does not consider jihad to be a duty for all Muslims, they do consider they objective of toppling the Assad regime in Syria to be a conflict that at its core is about Muslim concerns. While foreign fighters may come from other countries, Ahrar al-Sham extends welcoming arms because they believe in a common linkage among Muslims fighting for an Islamic regime in Syria.

Donations from supporters abroad were important for Ahrar's growth. Saudi Arabia, Qatar and Turkey have been reported to have actively supported Ahrar al-Sham. A statement issued by Ahrar al-Sham thanked Turkey and Qatar for their help. By 2013, the Kuwaiti private fund Popular Commission to Support the Syrian People, managed by Sheikh Ajmi and Sheik Irshid al-Hajri had supported Ahrar with US$400,000, for which Ahrar recorded a public thanks.

== Designation as a terrorist organization and relations with other groups ==
Ahrar al-Sham is not designated a terrorist organization by the U.S. State Department, the United Nations, or the European Union. Since December 2015, the UN Security Council has been trying to assemble a list of terrorist groups in Syria. Syria, Iraq, Russia, Lebanon, Egypt, and the United Arab Emirates support classifying Ahrar al-Sham as a terrorist group, but they have not been able to achieve a unanimous consensus.

Ahrar al-Sham's relationships with U.N. designated terrorist organizations has been, and continues to be, a key point of contention in U.S. and Russian foreign relations and in their Syrian ceasefire negotiations. The U.S. Department of State has said that "Ahrar al-Sham is not a designated foreign terrorist organization". However, some U.S. officials have reportedly considered designating it as a terrorist organization because of its links to al-Qaeda subgroups such as the al-Nusra Front.

In a speech at the Aspen Ideas Festival in Colorado on 28 June 2016, United States Secretary of State John Kerry referred to Ahrar al-Sham as one of several "subgroups" of terrorist groups, saying

But the most important thing, frankly, is seeing if we can reach an understanding with the Russians about how to, number one, deal with Daesh and al-Nusrah. Al-Nusrah is the other group there – Jabhat al-Nusrah. They are a designated terrorist group by the United Nations. And there are a couple of subgroups underneath the two designated – Daesh and Jabhat al-Nusrah – Jaysh al-Islam, Ahrar al-Sham particularly – who brush off and fight with that – alongside these other two sometimes to fight the Assad regime.

before which he had said of Ahrar al-Sham that

From Orlando to San Bernardino to the Philippines and Bali, we've seen pictures and we've heard testimony of shocking crimes committed by al-Qaida, by Boko Haram, by Jaysh al-Islam, by Ahrar al-Sham, by al-Shabaab, Daesh, other groups against innocent civilians, against journalists, and against teachers particularly.

— U.S. Department of State

It was reported that administration officials disapproved this mention and thought that it would potentially harm the U.S. government efforts to convince the Russians and the Syrian government not to attack Ahrar al-Sham with one senior administration official reportedly saying that despite the fact that "for months, we've been arguing to make sure the Russians and the Syrian regime don't equate these groups with the terrorists, Kerry's line yields that point." Explaining these comments, US State Department spokesman John Kirby said that "secretary Kerry was simply trying to describe the complexity of the situation in Syria, noting that we aren't blind to the notion that some fighters shift their loyalties." It was also reported that some Syrian groups see Kerry's comments as an example of how the Obama administration has slowly moved toward the Russian view of Syria, which includes painting all opposition groups as terrorists in order to justify attacking them.

Although Ahrar al-Sham is not officially designated as a terrorist organization in Germany, on 6 October 2016 a German court has convicted four German-Lebanese men who supplied the group in Syria of "supporting a terrorist organization", and, on 30 March 2017, two Syrian refugees who were members of Ahrar al-Sham were placed on trial in Munich, Germany for being members of a terrorist organization. According to the prosecutor, the goal of the group is to "overthrow the Syrian president Bashar al-Assad and establish an Islamic regime".

On 29 March 2019, the criminal court in Rotterdam, the Netherlands designated Ahrar al-Sham as a terrorist organization. The judge based his decision on the period between 2013 and 2018.

=== Relations with other groups ===
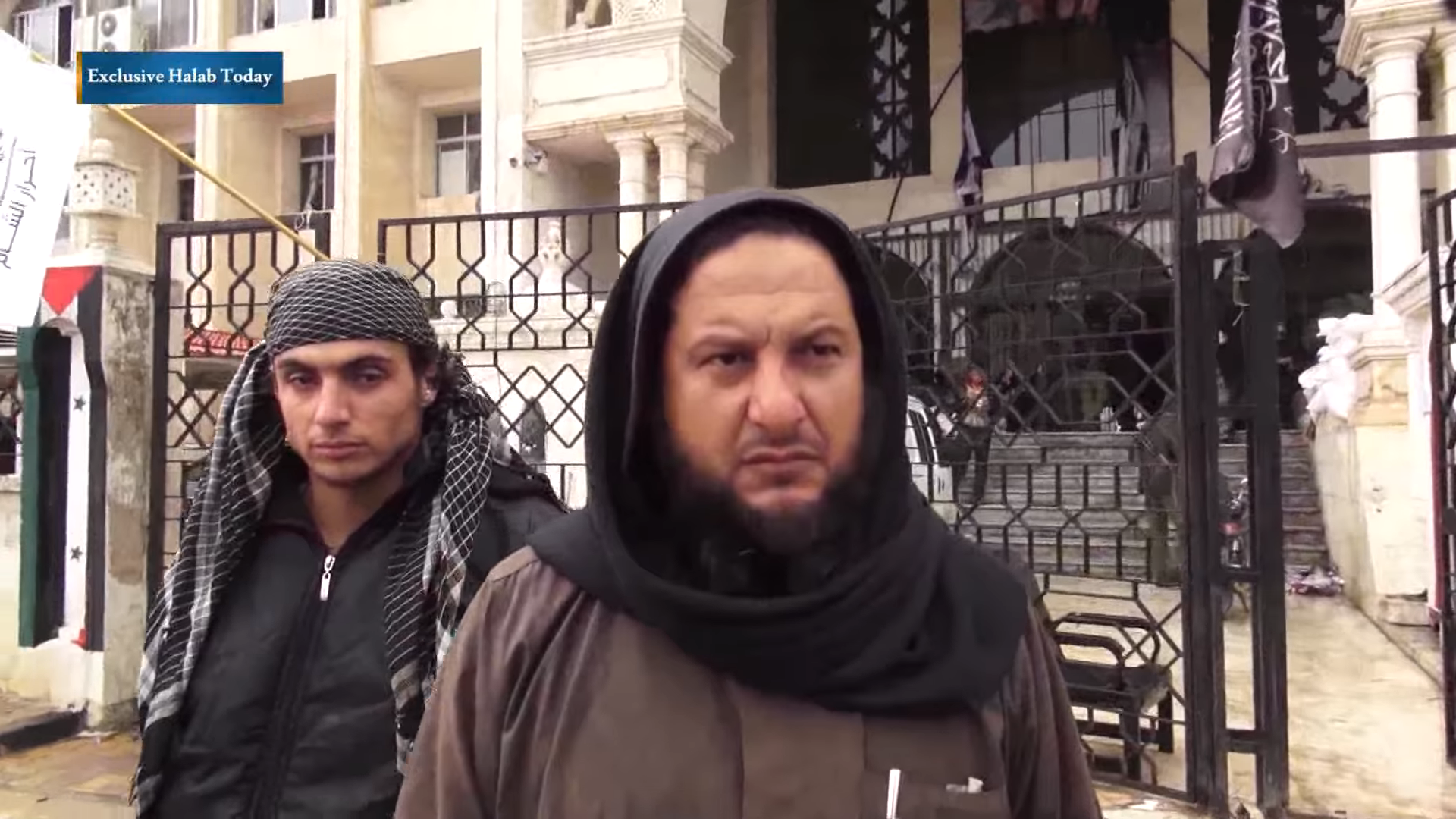
An al-Nusra Front field commander outside a building jointly occupied by al-Nusra and Ahrar al-Sham in the city of Idlib, 30 March 2015

Ahrar al-Sham had worked with ISIL until the two groups began their present-day hostilities with one another in February 2014. During Ahrar al-Sham's presence in Deir ez-Zor, after capturing oil fields from the Syrian government alongside other opposition groups, the group alongside the al-Nusra Front and Jaysh al-Islam co-signed a request asking the Islamic State's leader Abu Bakr al-Baghdadi to mediate a dispute over an oil field that was recently captured. In one instance, a commander affiliated with the Syrian Revolutionaries Front, claimed that the Islamic Front, which Ahrar al-Sham was a principle and founding member of, was more extreme than al-Nusra, and would eventually become a second IS.

In 2013, in response to a chemical weapon attack in eastern Ghouta by Government forces, ISIL, and the al-Nusra Front conducted separate revenge attacks, Ahrar al-Sham along with other Free Syrian Army-aligned factions including the Jesus Son of Mary Battalions and Alwiya al-Furqan jointly took part in the ISIL-led attacks code named "Volcano of Rage", and shelled Alawite neighborhoods in Damascus, as well areas near the Embassy of Russia in Damascus and the Four Seasons Hotel Damascus, where UN observers were reportedly staying to investigate the chemical attack. In the Raqqa Governorate between August and July 2013, several protests were held against both IS and Ahrar al-Sham, due to ISIL arresting Free Syrian Army commanders, the arrests also led to the defection of al-Nusra's commander from ISIL back to al-Nusra. The Ahfad al-Rasul Brigades supported the protests against ISIL and Ahrar al-Sham in August 2013.

Abu Khalid al-Suri, a "top al-Qaeda leader", co-founded Ahrar al-Sham and was until the time of his February 2014 death, by a suicide car bomb attack believed to be carried out by ISIL, though the attack was denied by ISIL, helping to lead Ahrar al-Sham which allowed Ayman Zawahiri, the leader of al-Qaeda, to influence the rebel group's actions despite the group officially having no affiliation with al-Qaeda. In 2015, Ahrar al-Sham, "whose late leader fought alongside Osama bin Laden," again denied having any links to al-Qaeda and in May 2016, the U.S., Britain, France, and Ukraine blocked a Russian proposal to the United Nations to blacklist Ahrar al-Sham as a terrorist group. The group was openly allied with its longterm partner al-Nusra Front and carried out joint operations with the group, and was in talks with it about a possible merger in mid-2016. Pro-government media reported that Ahrar al-Sham rejected the 2016 September 12 U.S.- and Russian-brokered Syrian ceasefire, citing the ceasefire's exclusion of certain Syrian rebel groups and declared solidarity with the al-Nusra Front, which was one of the groups excluded from this ceasefire.

After fighting broke out between ISIL and other opposition factions in Syria, Ahrar al-Sham and ISIL mutually agreed to withdraw from each other's spheres of influence, with Ahrar al-Sham withdrawing from the Raqqa Governorate that was dominated by ISIL and ISIL agreed to withdraw from opposition strongholds in the Idlib Governorate in 2014.

However, since late 2016, Al-Nusra and Ahrar al-Sham have been increasingly rivalrous, with military clashes between them taking place in the Idlib Governorate in January–March 2017 and July 2017.

In July 2017, in the Islamic State's weekly online newspaper al-Naba, IS mentioned Ahrar al-Sham as having previously shown, what it considers good Islamic character, and mentioned that in past disputes between Ahrar al-Sham and IS, Ahrar al-Sham had resolved disputes in a way in accordance to Sharia law.

In February 2018 Ahrar al-Sham and the Nour al-Din al-Zenki Movement merged and formed the Syrian Liberation Front then launched an offensive against Tahrir al-Sham seizing several villages and the city of Maarrat al-Nu'man.

In January 2020, a former IS-linked media outlet that has since turned critical of IS, wrote in a publication that IS had allowed former Ahrar al-Sham members to "repent" in eastern Syria, and specifically mentioned one former Ahrar al-Sham commander that joined IS despite openly opposing the group, and though defecting to IS he did not hold a military position in the group but he did work in oil fields held by IS, and held a prominent position in IS's oil industry.

== Flags ==
Flags of Ahrar al-Sham
The official flag of Ahrar al-Sham since early 2016

The Syrian independence flag used officially by Ahrar since 21 June 2017, in addition to their official flag, though members were using it for some months prior in an informal basis

This flag is occasionally used by Ahrar al-Sham

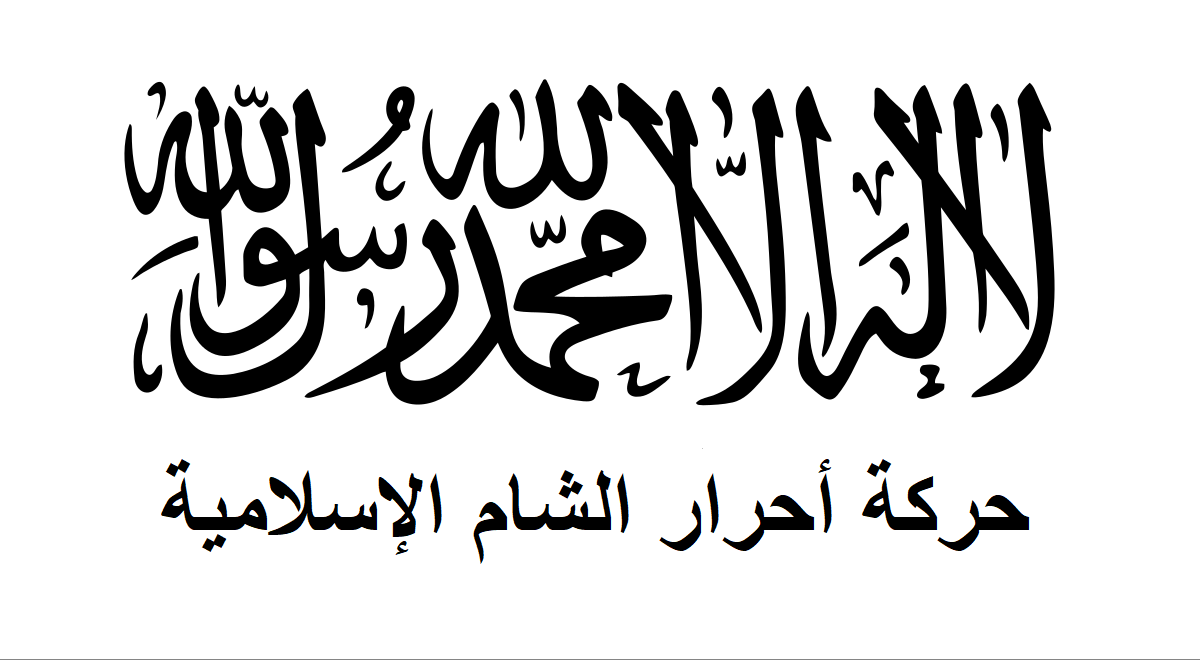
This flag is occasionally used by Ahrar al-Sham

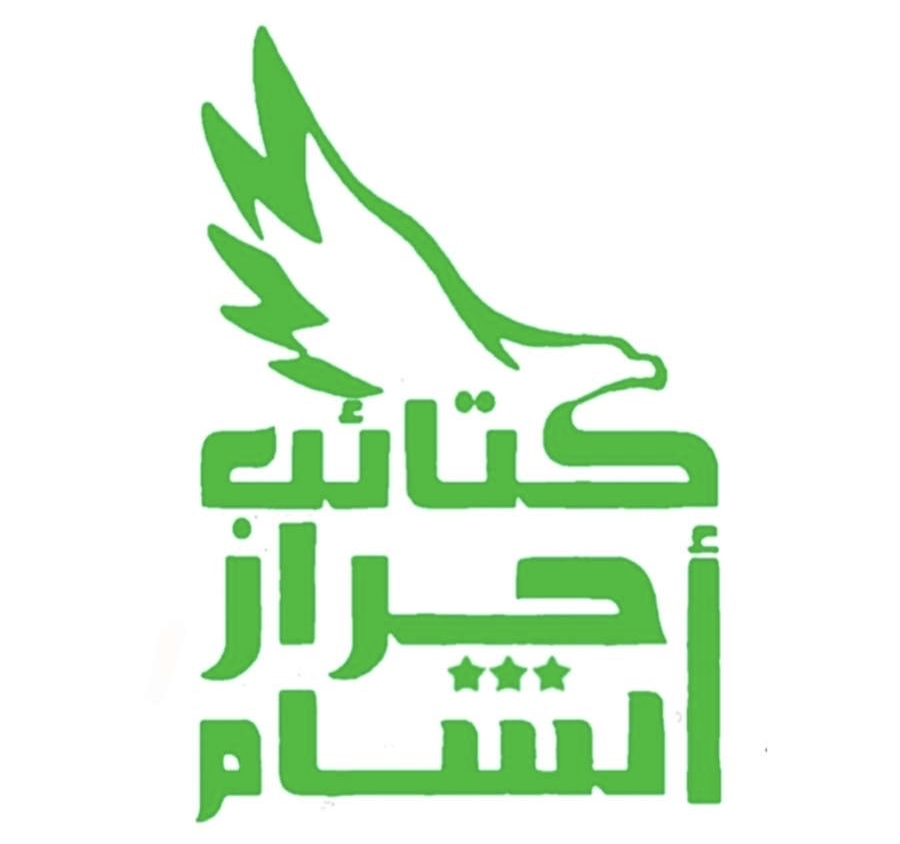
The original flag and logo of Ahrar al-Sham Brigades as used by the group from late 2011 to early 2013

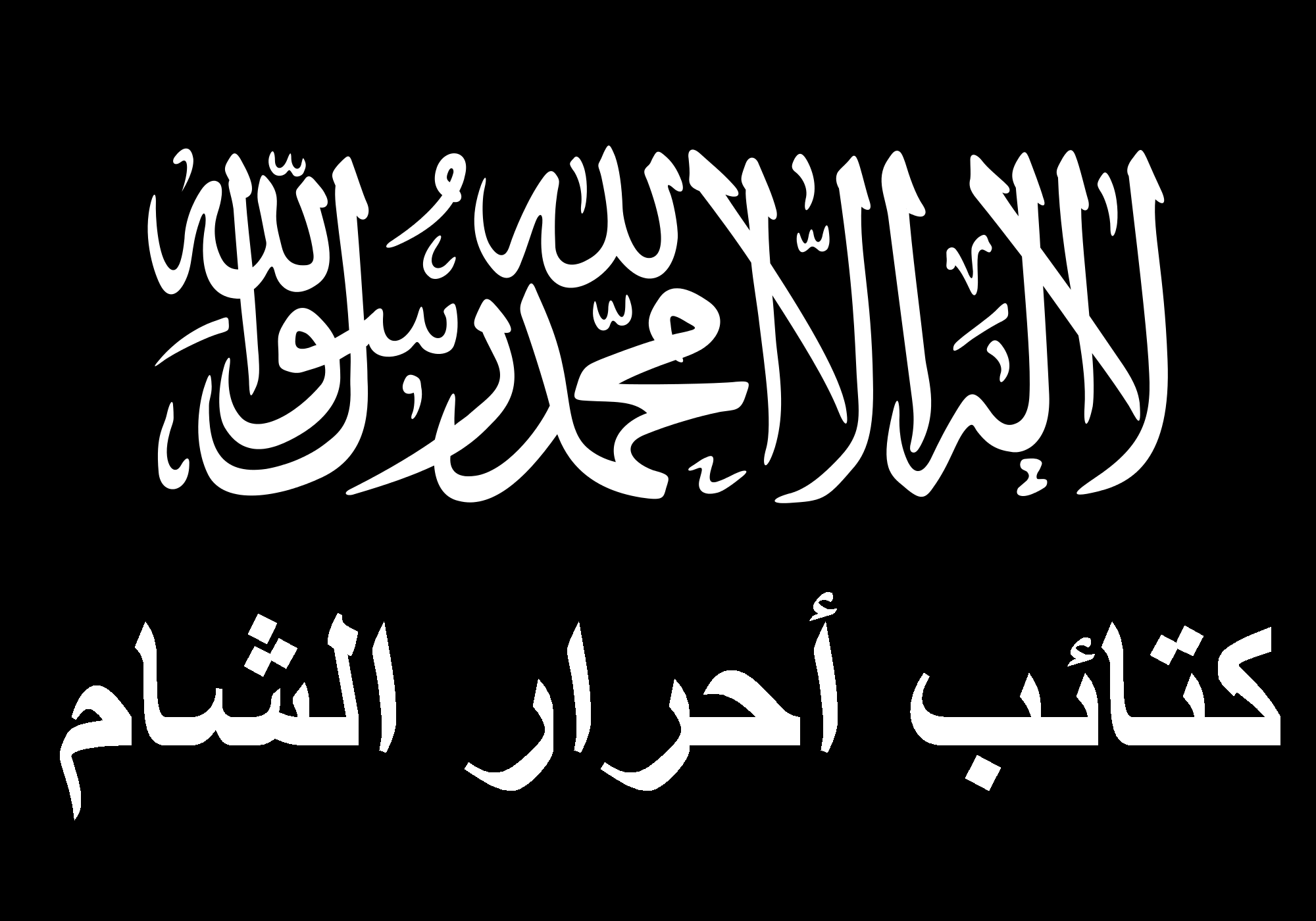
Another Flag used by Ahrar al-Sham Brigades

This variant of their flag was used from early 2013 to 2016 (also was used for the 10 year anniversary of Ahrar al-Sham in 2022)

== Member groups ==
- Al-Iman Army
- Hamza ibn Abdulmutallib Brigade
- Jaysh Al-Tawhid
- Mus'ab ibn Umayr Brigade
- Eagles of Islam
- Islamic Vangaurd
- Al-Fajr Islamic Movement
- Special Forces Unit
- Liwa Mujahidi al-Sham
- People of the Levant Front
  - Army of Mujahideen
    - 19th Division
      - Ansar Al Sharia Brigade
      - Abdullah Ibn El-Zubeir Brigade
      - The Men of Allah Brigade
      - The Martyr Mustafa Abdul-Razzaq's Brigade
      - Swords of The Most Compassionate Brigade
      - Khan al-Asal Free Brigades
      - Ash-Shuyukh Brigade
      - Muhajireen Brigade
    - Farouq Battalion
    - 5th Battalion
    - Revolutionaries of Atarib Gathering
    - Atarib Martyrs Brigade
    - Battalion of the Martyr Alaa al-Ahmad
    - Central Force for the City of Atarib
    - Ansar al-Haqq Battalion
    - Loyalty to God Battalion
    - Shells of Justice Brigade
    - Atarib Martyrs Brigade
- Jaysh al-Islam (Idlib branch)
- Fastaqim Union (most members, since January 2017)
- Kurdish Islamic Front
- Liwa al-Haqq
  - Katibat al-Furati
  - Kataeb Atbaa al-Rasoul
  - Katibat al-Ansar
- Jaysh al-Sunna (Hama branch)
- Levant Front (South-western Aleppo branch)
- Farouq Brigades (Binnish remnants)
- Omar al-Farouq Brigade
- Jaysh al-Sham
- Brigade of Conquest (Idlib branch)
- Ibn Taymiyyah battalions
- al-Miqdad ibn Amr
- Supporters of the East Regiment
- Martyr Usama Suno Battalion
- Katibat Khaled Ibn al-Walid
- Tahrir al-Sham elements in Northern Aleppo City outskirts
- Fajr al-Umma Brigade
- Katibat Saraya al-Fath
- Katibat Ansar al-Huda
- Lions of Islam Battalion
- Manbij Brigade (part of the TFSA, and not the SLF)
- Homs Legion (part of the TFSA, and not the SLF)
- Liwa al-Haramayn al-Sharifiyeen
- The Kurdish Pavilion
- Abu Amara Battalions
- Binaa Ummah Movement
- Dabous al-Ghab
- Lancer Corps
- Martyr Colonel Ahmed al-Omar Brigade
- Tawhid al-Asimah Brigades and Battalions
- Wa'atasimu Brigade
- Al-Adiyat Brigade
- Al-Abbas Brigade
- Al-Muhajireen wal Ansar Brigade
- Ahrar al-Homs Brigade
- Soldiers of Sunnah Brigade
- Ahrar al-Jabal Brigade
- Levant Revolutionaries Battalions
- Khattab Brigade
- Badr Brigade
- Jund al-Sham Battalions
- Al-Bishr Brigades
- Commandos of the Levant Brigade
  - Sheikh al-Islam Ibn Taymiyyah Battalion
  - Martyr Abu Dawood Battalion
  - Martyr Abu al-Baraa Battalion
  - Al-Ikhlas Battalion
  - Al-Jabriya Martyrs Battalion
  - Sinjar Martyrs Battalion
  - Martyr Adnan al-Timr Battalion
- Zeitan Battalions
- Liwa Rayat al-Nasr
- Al-Sakhana Brigades

== Former groups ==
Groups in italics left to join Hayat Tahrir al-Sham (HTS)

- Ahrar al-Sharqiya
- Jaysh al-Ahrar (Left HTS in mid-2017 due to disagreements with the leadership becoming an independent faction, later joined the National Front for Liberation with Ahrar al-Sham in August 2018)
  - Tamkeen Brigade
  - Liwa Ahrar al-Jabal al-Wastani
- Conquest Brigade
- Suqour al-Sham Brigades
- Ansar al-Sham (Though joining HTS the group did come under attack from HTS in August 2018, resulting in its separation from the group.)
- Ajnad al-Sham (Temporarily joined HTS then rejoined Ahrar al-Sham in mid-2017, however the group eventually rejoined HTS thereafter.)
- Hudhayfah ibn al-Yaman Battalions
- Qassem Battalion
- Lions of Tawhid Battalion
- Katibat al-Siddiq
- Martyr Ibrahim Qabbani Battalion
- Tawhid Battalion
- Martyrs of Islam Front
- Knights of the Caliphate Battalion
- Mountain Lions Battalion
- Abdullah Azzam Brigade
- Iman Brigade
- Lions of War Brigade
- Ahl al-Bayt Brigade
- Al-Majd Brigade
- Liwa Umana al-Raqqa (Joined the Syrian Democratic Forces)
- Liwa Jund al-Haramain (Joined the Army of Mujahideen later joined the Syrian Democratic Forces.)
- Ashida'a Mujahideen Brigade

== See also ==
- List of armed groups in the Syrian Civil War
- Abdul Razzaq al-Mahdi
