= Mujahideen Army (Syria) =

Syrian rebel group (2014–2017)

- Arabic: جيش المجاهدين; Jaysh al-Mujahideen
- Flag of the Army of Mujahideen
- Leaders: Lt. Col. Muhammad Juma Abdul Qader Bakur ("Abu Bakr"); Capt. Muhammad Shakerdi; Salim Abu Jaafar; Hammoud al-Barm †
- Dates active: 2 January 2014 – 25 January 2017
- Active regions: Aleppo Governorate, Syria
- Ideology: Sunni Islamism
- Size: 5,000+–12,000 (own claim, 2014); 4,000 (own claim, May 2016); 8,000 (December 2016, Russian military claim)
- Part of: Free Syrian Army (until 2017); Levant Front (2014–15); Fatah Halab (2015-2017); Ahrar al-Sham (since 2017)
- Wars: the Syrian Civil War

The Mujahideen Army (Arabic: جيش المجاهدين, Jaysh al-Mujahideen) was a Sunni Islamist rebel group formed in order to fight the former Syrian government and the Islamic State of Iraq and the Levant (ISIL) during the Syrian Civil War. Originally a coalition of several Islamist rebel groups, it accused ISIL of disrupting "security and stability" in areas that had been captured from the Syrian government. During its establishment in January 2014, the spokesperson of the coalition said it would start operations in Idlib and Aleppo and gradually expand towards the rest of Syria. In December 2016, the Army of Mujahideen was briefly reorganized as Jabhat Ahl al-Sham (Arabic: جبهة أهل الشام; Front of the People of the Levant), but this formation soon fell apart during rebel infighting in January 2017.

== Ideology ==
The Army of Mujahideen did not have a political program. Although the member groups have an Islamist identity, they were largely non-ideological Free Syrian Army affiliated groups formed earlier in the Syrian Civil War.

== History ==
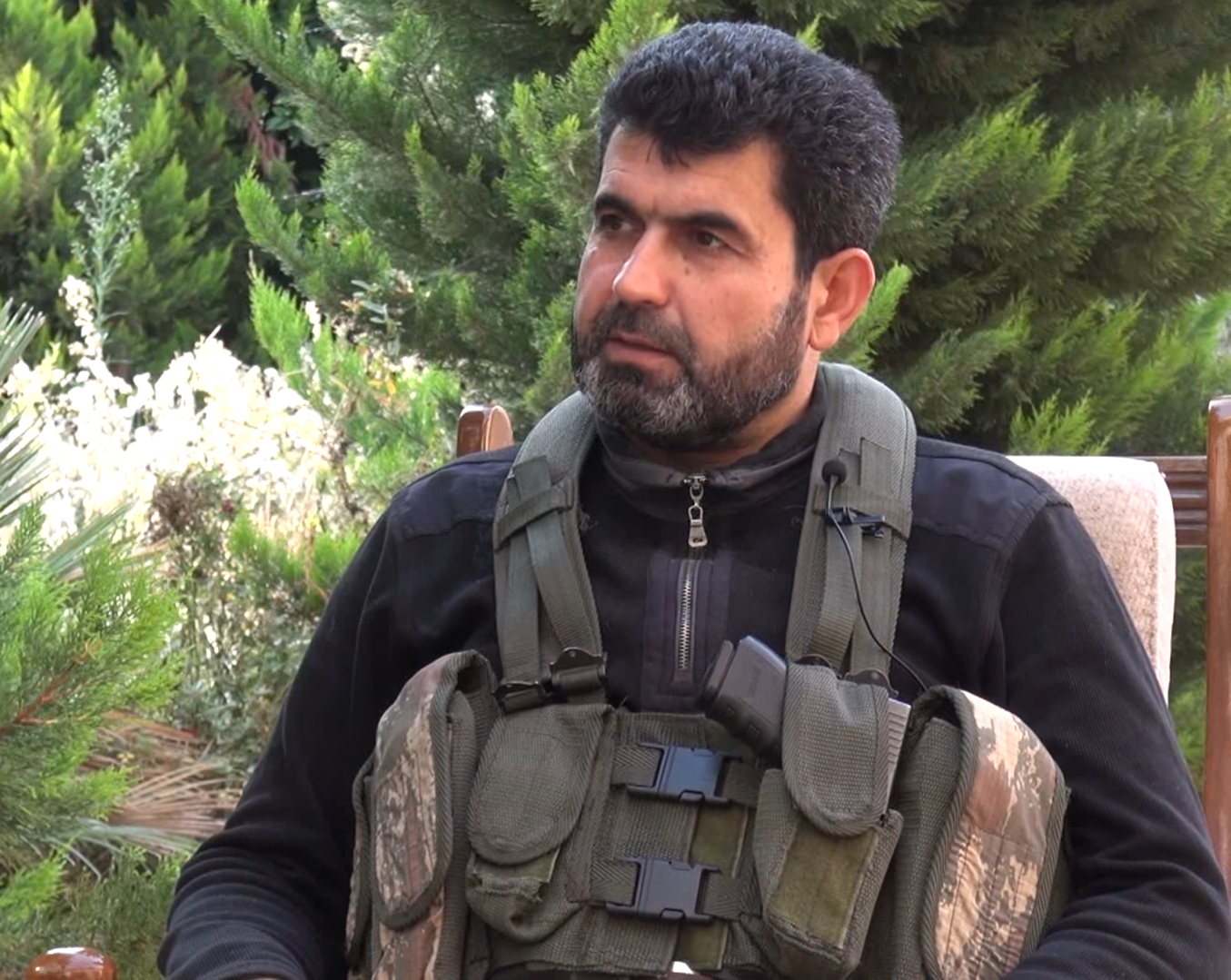
Lieutenant Colonel Muhammad Juma Abdul Qader Bakur (nom de guerre "Abu Bakr"), commander of the 19th Division and the Army of Mujahideen

The factions which formed the Army of Mujahideen largely emerged from the villages and towns of the Aleppo hinterland. The three groups at the core of the alliance were Division 19, the Fastaqim Union and the Nour al-Din al-Zanki Islamic Brigades, which was also then part of the Authenticity and Development Front.

In March 2014, members of one of its component groups, the Fastaqim Union, stopped Marcell Shehwaro, a Syrian Christian opposition activist, and demanded that she wear a hijab. She refused and was arrested, taken to a Sharia court, and forced to sign an agreement pledging to wear the hijab. An Army of Mujahideen commander issued a statement apologizing for its fighters' violent actions, but the ruling requiring Shehwaro to wear a hijab still stood.

On 4 May 2014, the Army of Mujahideen announced the withdrawal of the Nour al-Din al-Zanki Islamic Brigades from the coalition. On 3 June 2014, the Army of Mujahideen announced the expulsion of Division 19's Ansar Brigade and its leader, Abu Bakr, accusing them of theft and kidnapping.

Charles Lister, of the Brookings Doha Center, described the Army of Mujahideen as being a shadow of its former self by August 2014, partially due to a reduction in support it had received from foreign states. Fastaqim Kama Umirt left the group around December 2014.

In September 2014, the United States began planning weapon supplies to the group, and in the same month, fifty of the group's fighters were given military training in Qatar and supplied with BGM-71 TOW anti-tank missiles in a covert CIA program.

On 6 May 2015, it, along with 13 other Aleppo-based groups, joined the Fatah Halab joint operations room.

It announced its support to Turkey against the Kurdistan Workers Party. It also fights the Syrian Democratic Forces in Aleppo.

Several factions of the group, including the al-Noor Islamic Movement, the Amjad al-Islam Brigade, and the al-Quds Brigades left to join the Revolutionaries of the Levant Battalions in April 2015.

In December 2016, the Army of Mujahideen re-merged with Thuwar al-Sham Battalion and the Banner of Islam Movement to form Jabhat Ahl al-Sham.

On 23 January 2017, the al-Nusra Front attacked Jabhat Ahl al-Sham bases in Atarib and other towns in western Aleppo. All the bases were captured and by 24 January, the group was defeated and joined Ahrar al-Sham.

== Member groups ==
- 19th Division
  - Supporters of the Caliphate Brigade(denied by group)
  - Liwa Amjad al-Islam
  - Ahrar Khan al-Asal Brigades
  - Ash-Shuyukh Brigade
  - Muhajireen Brigade
- Farouq Battalion
- 5th Battalion
- Revolutionaries of Atarib Gathering
- Atarib Martyrs Brigade
- Battalion of the Martyr Alaa al-Ahmad
- Central Force for the City of Atarib
- Ansar al-Haqq Battalion
- Loyalty to God Battalion
- Shells of Justice Brigade

== Former member groups ==
- Nour al-Din al-Zenki Islamic Battalions
- Fastaqim Union
- Azadî Battalion
- Ansar Brigade (formerly part of the 19th Division)
- Liwa Jund al-Haramain (formerly part of the 19th Division, later joined the Syrian Democratic Forces.)

== See also ==
- List of armed groups in the Syrian Civil War
