= Fastaqim Union =

Syrian rebel group

Fastaqim Kama Umirt Union
- تجمع فاستقم كما أمرت; Union of Be Upright as Ordered
- Logo of the group. It also used the Syrian independence flag.
- Leaders: Sheikh Tawfiq Shahabuddin (1st overall leader); Mustafa Berro (nom de guerre: Saqr Abu Quteiba; overall leader); Ammar Sakkar (POW) (spokesman); Abu Hasanayn (POW) (military commander); Abu Abdo al-Zir (military commander); Lord Fourati (office director)
- Dates active: December 2012 – January 2017 (main faction); January 2017 – 2025 (various remnant groups)
- Groups: Nour al-Din al-Zenki Movement (formerly); Aleppo City Battalion; Aleppo of Shahba Brigade; Islam Brigade; Peace Brigade
- Active regions: Aleppo Governorate; Idlib Governorate
- Ideology: Islamism; Jihadism (until 2015)
- Size: 1,000-3,000 (2015)
- Part of: (Syrian opposition) Free Syrian Army; Army of Mujahideen (January-December 2014); Levant Front (late-2014-2015); Fatah Halab; Hawar Kilis Operations Room; Ahrar al-Sham (most members, since January 2017) (Syrian opposition) Syrian National Army
- Wars: the Syrian Civil War

The Fastaqim Kama Umirt Union (Arabic: تجمعُ فاستقم كما أمرتَ, romanized: Tajammuʿ Fastaqim Kamā Umirt, lit. 'Union of Be Upright as Ordered') was a rebel group active during the Syrian Civil War.

== History ==
=== Operations of the main faction ===
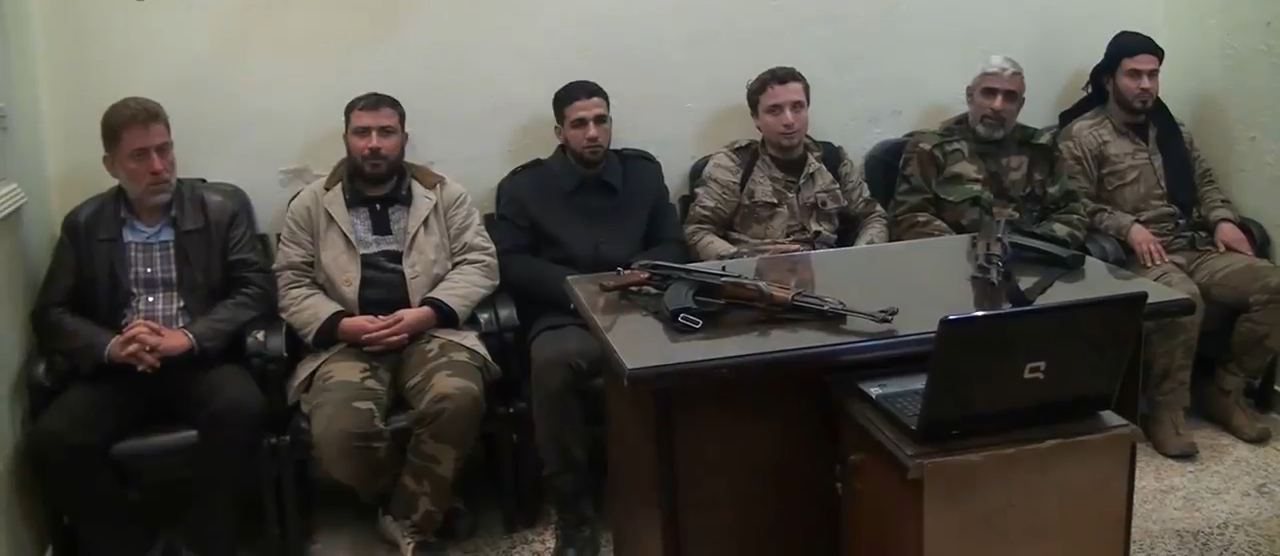
Fastaqim Union commanders announce an operation in Aleppo, January 2013.

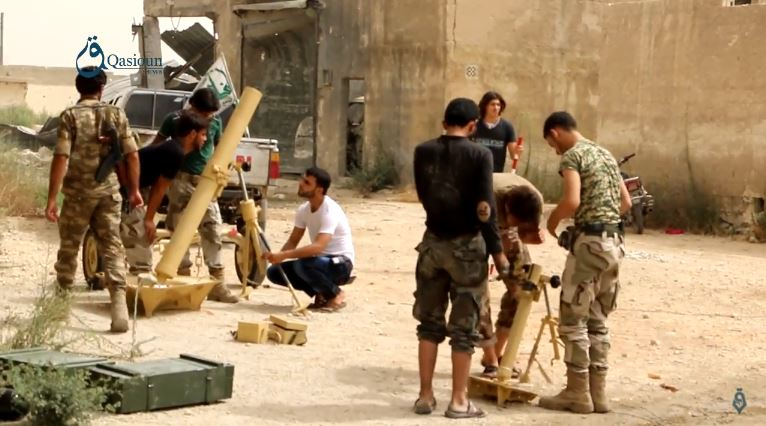
Mortar teams of the Fastaqim Union in 2015.

The Fastaqim Union takes its name from a Quranic verse, and was founded as an "Islamist umbrella movement" of pro-Free Syrian Army factions in December 2012. Its first overall commander was Sheikh Tawfiq Shahabuddin who headed the Nour al-Din al-Zenki Movement which was one of the Fastaqim Union's member groups at the time. Later on, Peace Brigade commander Mustafa Berro ("Saqr Abu Quteiba") became the Fastaqim Union's overall leader. Berro was described by one analyst in 2014 as "a young FSA-linked fighter." Analyst Nicholas A. Heras described Berro as moderate Islamist who regarded his uprising as being motivated by "secular idealism" yet also as part of a "jihad against the al-Assad government." By early 2014, the Fastaqim Union controlled territory in Aleppo city and the Aleppo countryside. It was one of the most important rebel groups involved in the Battle of Aleppo (2012–16), and served as a leading faction within several operations rooms and alliances such as the Levant Front.

In January 2014, it joined the Nour al-Din al-Zenki Movement and other rebel factions in the Aleppo-based Army of Mujahideen coalition. The group and the overall Army of Mujahideen caused controversy in March 2014 when other opposition groups criticised it for stopping Marcell Shehwaro, a Christian anti-government activist in Aleppo, and demanding that she wear a hijab. Shehwaro refused to do so, and was detained and forced by the fighters to sign an agreement pledging to wear a hijab from then on. A Fastaqim and Mujahideen commander released a statement which apologised and claimed that the arrest was a mistake by local commanders. However, he still demanded that Shehwaro wear a hijab.

On 26 April 2015, along with other major Aleppo based groups, they established the Fatah Halab joint operations room.

=== Collapse and remnant groups ===
On 2 November 2016, during the Aleppo offensive, Fastaqim Union fighters captured a military commander of the Nour al-Din al-Zenki Movement. In response, al-Zenki fighters attacked the Fastaqim Union's headquarters in the Salaheddine District and al-Ansari district of Aleppo. At least one rebel were killed and more than 25 wounded on both sides in the raid. The next day, the Levant Front and the Abu Amara Brigades began to patrol the streets to arrest any rebels taking part in the clashes. At least 18 rebels were killed in the infighting.

The group was mostly dissolved when the Nour al-Din al-Zenki Movement and the Abu Amara Brigades eventually captured all positions of the Fastaqim Union in eastern Aleppo in November 2016. Dozens of rebels from the latter group surrendered and were either captured, joined Abu Amara Brigades' parent group Ahrar al-Sham, or deserted. Some remnants of the Union remained active, but they were considered very weak. As the rebel-held parts of Aleppo were finally conquered by the Syrian Army in December 2016, the loyalist remnants of the Fastaqim Union were among the rebels that were evacuated from Aleppo to Idlib Governorate.

On 25 January 2017, the remaining members of the union's Aleppo branch that had relocated to Idlib joined Ahrar al-Sham. Former Fastaqim Union spokesman Ammar Sakkar explained that this move had become "a necessity", as the rebel factions had to unite in face of recent government gains, most notably the fall of rebel-held Aleppo. According to him "division has become illogical and would neither build a state nor establish a system of governance, which is an objective of the Syrian revolution".

On 11 May 2017, a former military commander of Fastaqim Union, Abu Hasanayn, was requested to a meeting in Idlib after coming from al-Bab. Once in Idlib, he was arrested by Ahrar al-Sham. The latter then demanded the remaining holdouts of the Fastaqim Union to surrender their weapons, leading to a clash. Less than an hour later, the Fastaqim headquarter was captured by Ahrar al-Sham. The incident was described as the "final nail in the coffin" for the group. Ammar Sakkar, the group's former spokesperson, was also arrested by Ahrar al-Sham. The attack by Ahrar al-Sham was justified by accusations levied against the Fastaqim union implying the group intended to pledge allegiance to Hay'at Tahrir al-Sham, with Lord Fourati, the former office director of the Fastaqim Union, calling the claims "shameful and illogical."

Despite the January 2017 merger of the remaining members of Fastaqim Union with Ahrar al-Sham, some members of the group remained independent. A Fastaqim Union remnant group under the command of Abu Abdo al-Zir was still active in the northern Aleppo countryside by November 2017, and under Hisham Eskif, it took part in the Turkish military operation in Afrin in early 2018.

== Organization ==
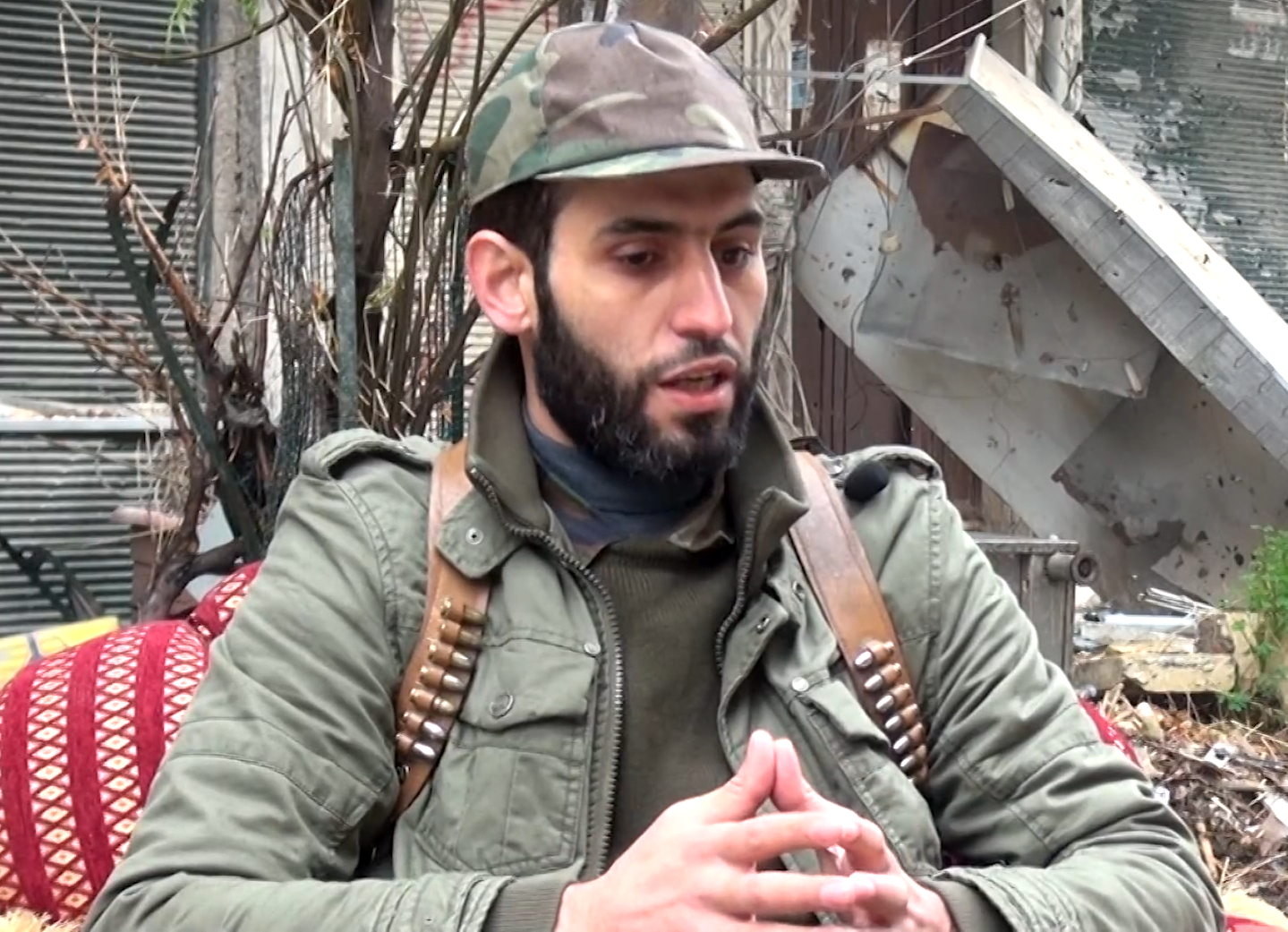
Mustafa Berro ("Saqr Abu Quteiba"), commander of the Fastaqim Union, in 2015.

Before it mostly collapsed in 2016, the Fastaqim Union was an umbrella organization for several militias, most of them operating on a "neighborhood level." It had around 1,500-3,000 fighters by 2015 and was supported by the Syrian Muslim Brotherhood, Turkey, and Qatar. The Fastaqim Union attempted to improve the fighting quality of its member groups through training by defected Syrian officers.

As part of the Turkish-backed Syrian National Army, the Fastaqim Union and its former member group the Peace Brigade are nominally organized as part of the 344th Brigade of the 34th Division of the SNA's 3rd Legion, alongside the 23rd Division.

== See also ==
- List of armed groups in the Syrian Civil War
