= Idlib insurgency =

Clashes in Idlib Governorate during the Syrian civil war

- Part of the Syrian civil war
| Date | 2011–2024 |
| Location | Idlib Governorate, Syria |
| Status | Hay'at Tahrir al-Sham victory |

Belligerents
| Syrian Government and loyalists Supported by: Russia | Syrian Salvation Government: Hayat Tahrir al-Sham; Jaysh al-Izza; Jaysh al-Ahrar; Army of Conquest (dissolved in 2017): Ahrar al-Sham (2015-2017) | National Front for Liberation: Syrian Liberation Front; Nour al-Din al-Zenki Movement; Ahrar al-Sham; Sham Legion; Free Idlib Army; Jabhat Thuwar Saraqib; Turkey | Islamic State; Support: Jund al-Aqsa (until 2017) Liwa Dawud (until 2014) Al-Qaeda: Hurras al-Din; Allies: Ansar al-Tawhid (sometimes, until 2020) |

Commanders and leaders
| Unknown | Ahmed al-Sharaa; Abu Jaber Sheikh; Abu Khadija Bilal al-Khuraisat †; Ali Keda; Riad al-Asaad; Abdul Jashari | Ala Abu Ahmed † | Ali Nejdet Aldiri (POW); Said al-Hunaiti (POW); Abu Khattab Kafr-Nabudah (POW) Abu Al-Walid al-Tunisi † |

Units involved
| Government loyalists: Military Intelligence Directorate | Syrian Salvation Government: Police forces | Unknown | Unknown |

The Idlib insurgency was an insurgency during the Syrian civil war in Idlib Governorate between multiple factions. The conflict was primarily between the supporters of Syrian Salvation Government and forces loyal to Syrian Arab Republic. Other factions participating in insurgency range from the Syrian opposition forces in the Syrian National Army, supported by Turkey, to supporters of Al-Qaeda branch Hurras al-Din and members of the Islamic State. The insurgency was marked by assassinations and bombings, as well as armed confrontations with small arms and raids.

== Initial fighting (2011-2015) ==
=== Beginning of clashes ===
On 29 June 2011, Syrian troops killed at least four civilians as army tanks and helicopters attacked a village in the northwestern province of Idlib, according to a Syrian human rights activist. Then in July, the Syrian government deployed more troops to the region, first on 2 July, then later again on 4 July following massive anti-government protests. Nightly protests continued despite the military siege.

On 8 September 2011, military clashes began when government security forces abducted the 74-year-old Muhammad Harmoush, who was the brother of army defector Lieutenant Colonel Hussein Harmoush, one of the first defecting officers. Muhammad Harmoush's body was later returned to his family, with three military defectors and six government soldiers reportedly killed. A few weeks later on 29 September, the Harmoush Battalion of the Free Syrian Army claimed responsibility for an attack on security forces in the Jabal Zawiya area, killing a number of security personnel.

=== Government defense ===
By 21 December 2011, it was reported that the Free Syrian Army had taken control over large swathes of Idlib province including some towns and villages. On 16 February 2012, Russian sources reported that several of the Idlib neighbourhoods fell under the control of armed groups who were looting government buildings and private offices. The LCC reported that a massacre took place in the city, with 38 people killed, most in the Muhameel, allegedly executed by Syrian Army. Heavy tank fire was also reported in the area. Several days later, FSA gunmen killed a state prosecutor and a judge.

In March 2012, following a battle in the city of Idlib, sources from both sides reported that government forces had recaptured the city. By the end of 17 March, the AFP, Associated Press, Al Jazeera and Al Arabiya had also reported that the city was recaptured by the Syrian Army. Soon afterwards, government forces also recaptured neighboring towns in the Idlib province, including Sarmin and Killi.

=== Restart of hostilities ===
Military situation around Idlib in May 2014, with government forces in red and opposition forces in green.

In early April 2012, the clashes briefly paused as a result of a ceasefire from the Kofi Annan Syrian peace plan, but the plan soon fell apart and fighting later resumed. By early June, the area of al-Ghab plain near Idlib was reportedly under opposition control, along with surrounding towns such as Jisr al-Shughour in the north and Tell Salhab in the south. However, Idlib proper was still being held by government forces.

On 8 October 2012, opposition forces launched an offensive to capture the strategically significant town of Maarrat al-Nu'man, where government reinforcements from Damascus heading toward Aleppo would need to pass through. By the next day, the opposition had captured all of the government checkpoints around the city except one at the entrance, and the town came fully under opposition control by 10 October.

On 20 January 2013, the Free Syrian Army began a coordinated attack on Idlib, successfully capturing several checkpoints in the western parts of the city. Opposition forces from Hish also captured part of the M5 motorway and severed the connection between Aleppo and Hama for government forces.

== Intra-opposition fighting (2015-2024) ==
=== 2016 ===
On 31 March 2016, the Army of Conquest coalition claimed to have captured members of a cell belonging to Jaysh al-Thuwar, an Arab component of the Syrian Democratic Forces (SDF) in Idlib that was reportedly conducting assassinations and kidnappings in the area.

On 4 October 2016, Ahrar al-Sham arrested an alleged ISIL cell affiliated with Jund al-Aqsa, which later retaliated by arresting some Ahrar al-Sham members, allegedly beating the wife, and shooting the brother of one member in the process. Two days later, Ahrar al-Sham gave an ultimatum to Jund al-Aqsa to release the captured members. Jund al-Aqsa countered by asking for Ahrar al-Sham to release the captive Jund al-Aqsa members that were alleged to be a part of ISIL.

=== 2017 ===
On 16 June 2017, a suicide bomber attempted to assassinate Saudi cleric Abdullah al-Muhaysini, who was serving on Hayat Tahrir al-Sham (HTS)'s Sharia component and had left a mosque in Idlib. In an online video after the attack, Muhaysini said that he was uninjured and explained that an individual had approached his car, wore an explosive belt, and blew himself up.

On 24 July 2017, during fighting between Ahrar al-Sham and Hayat Tahrir al-Sham, car bombs were detonated in Idlib that reportedly killed 50 HTS members and had belonged to Ahrar al-Sham.

=== 2018 ===
In February 2018, Hayat Tahrir al-Sham accused the Nour al-Din al-Zenki Movement of planting IEDs and of assassinating HTS members in Idlib, which later led to an armed conflict between them.

On 26 April 2018, the HTS commander Abu al-Ward Kafer Batikh and his bodyguards were killed in Ma'arrat al-Nu'man. On the same day, Abu Salim Binnish, a Syrian Liberation Front (SLF) commander was killed by gunmen in Binnish.

On 28 April, a Free Syrian Police commander was killed by an IED in northern Idlib. Hours later, pro-opposition activists reported that two members of Jaysh al-Izza had been killed by unidentified gunmen in Khan Shaykhun and that a commander belonging to Jaysh al-Ahrar had been killed the same day. In response, an HTS security official accused Ahrar al-Sham of carrying out the assassinations.

In May 2018, HTS claimed to have detained members of an all-female assassination cell in Idlib that were loyal to the Syrian government and had even recruited by Russia.

On 18 June 2018, Jaysh al-Ahrar's deputy commander was killed by gunmen in Saraqib after he had prayed at a mosque. The group released a statement saying that the assassins were unknown individuals.

On 22 June, a senior HTS leader, Abu Khadija Bilal al-Khuraisat, was killed by gunmen in Tarmala. On the same day, Jaysh al-Ahrar and the Sham Legion arrested the leader of ISIL's Idlib Province.

On 29 July, three SLF members were killed in Ma'arrat al-Nu'man. The group claimed the assassination had been carried out by spies belonging to the Syrian government.

=== 2019 ===
In January 2019, an ISIL-linked media group called the Muhajireen Foundation, which provides reports on events that effect displaced ISIL fighters in Syria, released a statement warning displaced ISIL fighters in Idlib to avoid gatherings because of crackdowns by HTS and Al-Qaeda's Syrian branch: the Guardians of Religion Organization.

On 18 January 2019, a car bomb exploded at an HTS checkpoint in Idlib and reportedly resulted in the death of 10 HTS militants. On the same day, gunmen wounded three HTS fighters, and a Jaysh al-Izza commander was killed after a bomb detonated that had been placed into his car by an unknown group.

On 29 January, a female suicide bomber HTS believed to be affiliated with ISIL attacked the headquarters of the Syrian Salvation Government. After fighting the guards outside, she blew herself up, wounding a number of people. The group's Amaq News Agency later denied being involved with the attack.

In March 2019, HTS executed several ISIL members believed to be behind drive-by shootings, assassinations, and bombings in Idlib city. HTS reportedly installed security cameras around the city to monitor the area.

On 5 March 2019, HTS raided an ISIL compound in Atarib and captured an ISIL commander as well as several stockpiles of small arms, munitions, as well as bomb making materials and explosives already manufactured by ISIL.

On 14 March, several ISIL members escaped from an HTS prison, reportedly after a series of Russian airstrikes in the area.

In August 2019, the ISIL-linked Muhajireen Foundation published an infographic showing three separate HTS activities against ISIL in Idlib. The infographic announced that several individuals held by HTS were executed publicly for allegedly belonging to ISIL and carrying out bombings. The report also included a report that two individuals were arrested in Nayrab for planting IEDs on behalf of ISIL. The report also stated that HTS raided the military headquarters of the Guardians of Religion Organization and its ally Ansar al-Tawhid, which is made up of former Jund al-Aqsa elements, in a town near Jisr al-Shughur, and arrested two Egyptians from both groups for having ties to ISIL.

On 5 August, a Tunisian commander of the Guardians of Religion Organization was assassinated by unknown perpetrators in Taftanaz, and some pro-opposition activists claiming the assassins were ISIL-linked.

=== 2020 ===
On 18 March 2020, as part of a ceasefire arrangement after a Syrian government offensive in Idlib, Turkish troops entered the de-escalation zone to reopen the M4 highway previously blocked by HTS and other jihadist factions. On the same day, an Ahrar al-Sham commander was killed after a roadside bomb went off while he was driving near Jisr al-Shughur.

On 19 March, two Turkish soldiers were killed and a third was wounded by an attack that the Turkish Defense Ministry claimed had been carried out by unnamed radical groups. The Guardians of Religion Organization was accused of carrying out the attack.

On 24 March, a mine detonated while a Turkish military convoy was passing through the town of Sufahan in southern Idlib on the M4 highway, which resulted in two Turkish soldiers wounded. On the same day, unknown gunmen tried to kidnap a rebel commander of Jabhat Thuwar Saraqib in Idlib city and wounded him by gunshot.

On 30 March, a judge affiliated with Hayat Tahrir al-Sham was killed, along with another individual with him in an IED attack in Idlib.

On 4 April, an Ahrar al-Sham field commander was killed by a mine in Sufahan.

On 13 April, protestors who were demonstrating against Turkish forces patrolling the M4 highway, as part of a ceasefire agreement with Russia, were broken up by Turkish military personnel. In response fighters from HTS, which supported the protests, opened fire on the Turkish military. After the incident, the HTS fighters involved in the shootings were reprimanded by their command. Ut has been the first reported incident of aggressive actions between HTS and Turkish forces in Syria, but HTS had reportedly stopped Russian patrols and acted aggressively towards them since the implementation of the agreement between Turkey and Russia regarding Idlib.

On the same day, following the incident between HTS and the Turkish military, HTS arrested a commander from Faylaq al-Sham, a Turkish-backed rebel group, and members of his National Front for Liberation. The National Front for Liberation members were reportedly heading to frontlines in Saraqib when they were arrested at an HTS checkpoint in the town of Neyrab, near Saraqib.

On 16 April, an unknown aircraft attacked a jihadist vehicle killing three rebels from Jaish al-Nasr in the al-Ghaab plain. The aircraft was supposedly a Russian drone according to Al Masdar News and the Syrian Observatory for Human Rights.

On 19 April, HTS attacked the headquarters of the Guardians of Religion Organization and attempted to force the group to withdraw from the town of Armanaz after HTS's decision to reopen trade crossings to government held areas had been opposed by locals and the Guardians of Religion Organization. The Guardians of Religion Organization then released a statement that stated that HTS was reckless and should redirect its attention to fighting the Syrian government instead.

On 26 April, Turkish forces demolished tents set by protestors during a sit-in in Al-Karama. Protesters, including Hayat Tahrir al-Sham rebels opposed the agreement made between Turkey and Russia regarding the reopening of the M4 highway. After clashes that had left four killed including HTS members, jihadist forces attacked a Turkish outpost and left several Turkish soldiers wounded, who were evacuated by helicopter to Turkey. Turkish drones were reported targeting a car belonging to the HTS killing two fighters and leaving three wounded.

On 8 May, Syrian government forces captured two members of Jaysh al-Ahrar in Idlib near the border between the Syrian government-held territory and countryside frontlines with the rebels.

On 21 May, an HTS leader was targeted by an improvised explosive device planted below his vehicle, killing him instantly.

On 27 May, the Turkish Ministry of Defense announced the death of a Turkish soldier by an explosion on the Aleppo-Latakia Highway in northwestern Idlib. A convoy of Turkish military vehicles and opposition factions was targeted by an IED, Turkish helicopters evacuated the wounded to Al-Rayhaniyyah.

On 29 May, Hayat Tahrir al-Sham raided the house of a former Jund al-Aqsa commander, killed him in front of his family and disposed his body at an unknown location. On the same day, a Christian civilian was kidnapped in Al-Ya’qubiya for unknown reasons by unidentified persons.

On 5 June, an attack on a Turkish Army ambulance killed two Turkish soldiers on the Idlib-Sarmin Highway in Idlib Governorate.

On 14 June, a drone targeted a vehicle killing two jihadist leaders, one Jordanian and one Yemeni national, both leaders of an Al-Qaeda-affiliated group, Guardians of Religion Organization. The Syrian Observatory for Human Rights hinted that the attacking drone could have been an American drone.

On 15 June, unknown assailants targeted and killed a leader of Jaysh Al-Suqur, a Turkish-backed rebel group in Idlib tgatwas part of the National Liberation Front. Another rebel leader was injured in the attack.

On 26 June, fighting between HTS and Hurras al Din took place in Kafr Rohin and Ma’artin left 19 fighters killed in Idlib, 12 from Guardians of Religion Organization and 7 from HTS.

On 18 August, two US MQ-9 Reapers combat drones were lost over Idlib. According to US officials, both drones collided and crashed. However, video images show one of the drones already on fire before crashing and an explosion in the air hinted that at least one of the drones had been shot down by Turkish-backed rebels or Turkish forces.

On 6 September, unknown assailants targeted a Turkish military base in the town of Ma’atram near Idlib city. The attack resulted in two Turkish soldiers wounded, but one of them later died.

On 13 and 14 September, International Coalition combat drones targeted and killed two leaders of Guardians of Religion Organization. A Tunisian national in Al-Qusoor neighbourhood of Idlib city and the Uzbek jihadist leader Abu Yehia of Guardians of Religion Organization were killed.

On 20 Septemberm Syrian and Russia aircraft targeted jihadist positions of HTS and the Guardians of Religion Organization group in Idlib Governorate. During the attack, a command center was destroyed.

On 22 October, US-led coalition drones targeted a meeting in Salqin Province Idlib that had been arranged by an ex-ISIS member with the participation of Guardians of Religion Organization members. At least 23 persons were killed including;17 jihadists and 6 civilians.

On 26 October, Russian aircraft bombed a training camp of Sham Legion, a Turkish-backed rebel group, near Kafr Takharim in Idlib Governorate. The strike killed 78 fighters and wounded more than 100. The head of the Syrian Observatory for Human Rights called the strike the heaviest attack since the beginning of the ceasefire.

On 1 November, fighters of Hayyaat Tahrir Al-Sham besieged and stormed the headquarters of Ahrar al-Sham in Jabal Al-Zawiyah, Idlib.

On 7 November, seven Jihadists from Uzbekistan affiliated to Hayyaat Tahrir Al-Sham were killed by a loitering munitions drone strike in Jabal Al-Zawiyah. The attack was carried out by pro-government forces. Syrian Air Forces backed by Russian Jet fighters targeted rebel forces at 6 locations in Idlib including, command centers and arms depots used by Hayaat Tahrir Al-Sham, leaving 30 rebels killed.

=== 2021 ===
On 3 February, a Turkish soldier died of wounds sustained in an attack on 31 January by unnamed gunmen.

On 29 April, fighting between Syrian Army and rebel forces in Idlib killed one Syrian government officer.

On 11 May, the Turkish Ministry of Defense announced the death of a soldier and the wounding of four others as a result of rocket fire by unknown attackers on Idlib.

On 20 September, two Jihadist commanders with ties to Al-Qaeda are killed by a US-led coalition drone strike in Idlib region. The vehicle was targeted on the road leading from Idlib city to Binnish.

On 3 October, SOHR reported an explosion in an ammunition warehouse in Wadi al-Naseem neighbourhood in Idlib city, which killed a member of the Turkistan Islamic Party and injured four others while Russian jets continue bombing areas belonging to the “de-escalation zone”.

== See also ==
- SDF insurgency in Northern Aleppo
- Eastern Syria insurgency
- Second Northern Syria Buffer Zone
- Daraa insurgency
