= Abu al-Abd Ashidaa =

Syrian rebel commander

Abu al-Abd Ashidaa أبو العبد أشداء
- Military career
- Allegiance: Syrian Opposition; Suqour al-Sham Brigades (2012-2013); Ahrar al-Sham (2013-2016); Fajr al-Sham; Hay'at Tahrir al-Sham (2017-2019); Jihad Coordination (2020-2023)
- Service years: 2011-2023
- Nickname: Abu al-Abd Ashidaa
- Commands: Army of Aleppo; Ashidaa Mujahideen Brigades; Army of Umar Ibn Khattab (Until 2019)
- Conflicts: Syrian Civil War; Battle of Aleppo (2012-2016); Aleppo offensive (November–December 2016); Inter-rebel conflict during the Syrian Civil War; Idlib Governorate clashes (June 2020); Northwestern Syria offensive (April–August 2019)

Abu al-Abd Ashidaa is a Syrian rebel commander, Aleppo native, and former head of the Aleppo-based Army of Aleppo rebel coalition that included several Syrian rebel groups including various Free Syrian Army factions as well as Ahrar al-Sham and the Levant Front.

== Background ==
Ashidaa was the commander of the Ashidaa Mujahideen Brigade which was first publicly noticed in 2014, however the Ashidaa Mujahideen Brigade was established in 2012, with his brother Abu Ahmad al-Halabi, he was also associated with Suqour al-Sham and served as Suqour al-Sham's religious advisor. In 2013 the group joined Ahrar al-Sham and remained part of it until defecting from Ahrar al-Sham in 2016 in response to Ahrar al-Sham's involvement in Operation Euphrates Shield which drew manpower away from Aleppo to other areas in northern Syria to fight the Islamic State and the Syrian Democratic Forces alongside the Turkish military, despite several recent losses in Aleppo to pro-government forces in the area at the time. The group was based in the Sukkari area of Aleppo and has been accused of flogging individuals for not attending Friday prayers.

After the flogging incident, Ahrar al-Sham denied involvement in it, causing the Ashidaa Mujahideen Brigade to temporarily leave Ahrar al-Sham for Harakat Fajr ash-Sham al-Islamiya. However the group later rejoined Ahrar al-Sham.

During his leadership over the Ashidaa brigade which was part of Ahrar al-Sham, he attracted Egyptian recruits based in rural Aleppo who organized Dawah campaigns, including Abu Yaqdhan al-Masri who later became a prominent religious official in Hay'at Tahrir al-Sham.

== Biography ==
On 1 December 2016, after suffering several setbacks and losses in Aleppo, Ashidaa was made the emir of the Army of Aleppo rebel alliance in the besieged rebel pocket in eastern Aleppo. After the rebel loss in Aleppo, he blamed several unnamed rebel groups for hoarding supplies that would later end up unused and thus falling into the hands of the Syrian government, as well as claiming that several of the rebel groups had been infiltrated by agents from the Syrian government, as well as groups backed by foreign states, claiming they were ordered to withdraw from Aleppo in order to take part in Operation Euphrates Shield.

In 2017 after the formation of Hay'at Tahrir al-Sham, Ashidaa joined the group and was made the leader of the group's branch in western Aleppo, known as the Army of Umar Ibn Khattab.

On 9 September 2019, Ashidaa released a video criticizing Hay'at Tahrir al-Sham, saying that the group was corrupt internally and called upon its members to launch a revolt from within while calling its leadership tyrannical and had taken part in the seizure of property and monopolizing the local economy in its own favor and inadequately spending on its military activities, being incompetent in the defense of rebel held areas as a result. The next day he was reportedly dismissed from his position as the leader of the Army of Umar Ibn Khattab by HTS and would face punishment from the leadership of HTS.

On 12 September 2019, he was arrested by HTS for charges of slander and inciting division in HTS as well as leaking potentially damaging information publicly, that HTS claimed could benefit its enemies. Ashidaa remained in HTS custody as of 17 September 2019, and was reportedly being held under close supervision and his family was not allowed to communicate with him.

In 2020, during the late 2019-early 2020 Syrian government's offensive in Idlib he was released from prison by Hay'at Tahrir al-Sham, and formed his own group called Jihad Coordination, and stated that the COVID-19 pandemic was spreading as a result of moral corruption and cited Hadiths regarding the spread of viruses as a punishment of God.

Jihad Coordination joined the So Be Steadfast Operations Room when it formed in June 2020.

He was arrested in Turkey in June 2023 and was released over two years later.

== See also ==
- Abu Jaber Sheikh
- Abdul Razzaq al-Mahdi
- Sami al-Oraydi
