= Abu Salah al-Uzbeki =

Sirojiddin Mukhtarov Сирожиддин Мухтаров
- Nickname: Abu Salah al-Uzbeki
- Born: 23 May 1990; Kyrgyzstan
- Died: 8 September 2022 (aged 32) Idlib, Syria
- Allegiance: Leader of Katibat al-Tawhid wal-Jihad, Imam Shamil Battalion and member of the Ansar al-Din Front
- Service years: until 2022
- Conflicts: Syrian civil war †; North Caucasus Insurgency; Islamic State insurgency in the North Caucasus

Sirojiddin Mukhtarov (23 May 1990 -8 September 2022), commonly known by his nom de guerre Abu Salah al-Uzbeki, was the head of the Ansar al-Din Front in Syria and was the founder of Katibat al-Tawhid wal-Jihad (KTWJ).

== Life ==
Al-Uzbeki headed KTWJ, which he formed in 2013, until he was deposed in 2019. As head of KTWJ, he reaffirmed his bay'ah to Al Qaeda in January 2019.

Al-Uzbeki was given the title sheikh by various jamaats from Central Asia, given his knowledge of Islam; he had studied "fiqh... and hadith" in Damascus in the 2000s. He was also known as Hafiz, as he had memorized the Quran. In contrast, his successor, Ilmurad Khikmatov, also known as Abdul Aziz, was known as ustoz or damlo, meaning teacher, and was not as well-versed in Islamic studies.

He and 50 other fighters defected from Hay'at Tahrir al-Sham (HTS) and joined the Ansar al-Din Front.

The So Be Steadfast Operations Room was formed in June 2020 by Hurras al-Din, Ansar al-Din Front, Jihad Coordination and the Ansar Fighters Brigade, as well as Ansar al-Islam. His arrest on 16 June 2020 led to infighting between HTS and other militant groups. Al-Uzbeki was released in March 2021, after serving nine months.

Al-Uzbeki was reportedly killed in a Russian air raid on Idlib on 8 September 2022, though his death was denied by HTS.
