= Idlib Governorate clashes (June 2020) =

Military operation

- Part of the Syrian Civil War
- Situation in Idlib Governorate as of 23 June 2020. Hurras Al-Din control Tahrir al-Sham and allies control National Front for Liberation and allies control Syrian Government and allies control
Date	23–26 June 2020 (3 days)
Location	Idlib Governorate, Syria
Result	Hay'at Tahrir al-Sham victory
Territorial changes	Guardians of Religion Organization and its allies capture several checkpoints and sites near the city of Idlib and in the Jisr-ash-Shugur countryside.; HTS recaptures all lost territory and surrounds HaD strongholds; The two sides sign a ceasefire agreement on 26 June

Belligerents
Syrian Salvation Government; National Front for Liberation	So Be Steadfast Operations Room

Commanders and leaders
Abu Mohammad al-Julani	Abu al-Abd Ashidaa; Unnamed foreign commander †; Abu Salah al-Uzbeki (POW); Abu al-Malik al-Talli (POW)

Units involved
Hay'at Tahrir al-Sham	Hurras al-Din; Ansar al-Din Front; Jama'at Ansar al-Islam; Jihad Coordination; Ansar Fighters Brigade

Casualties and losses
11 killed	18 killed
- 1 civilian killed, 4 injured Dozens displaced

The Idlib Governorate clashes (June 2020) were a series of armed confrontations between Hay'at Tahrir al-Sham (HTS) and the So Be Steadfast Operations Room, led by the Guardians of Religion Organization (HaD). The conflict began after HTS arrested the leader of the Ansar al-Din Front, Abu Salah al-Uzbeki, and a dissenting leader of a group within HTS, Abu al-Malik al-Talli.

== Background ==
On 5 March 2020, a cease-fire was agreed to between Russia and Turkey, ending the battle for the province that began in December 2019. Several hard-line jihadist groups rejected the ceasefire. On 12 June, the So Be Steadfast Operations Room was formed, to continue violating the cease-fire.

Hay'at Tahrir al-Sham was engaged in a campaign of arrests of opponents and extremist fighters in areas of Idlib province under its control. HTS arrested several leaders of the new operations room, including al-Uzbeki, leader of the Ansar al-Din Front, and dissenter Abu al-Malik al-Talli, leader of the Ansar Fighters Brigade which defected from HTS.

The Guardians of Religion Organization set up several checkpoints in areas west of Idlib city, and refused to dismantle them according to HTS.

== Timeline ==
In response to the arrests of several senior leaders, the So Be Steadfast Operations Room deployed fighters to checkpoints in the areas of Armanaz, Arab Said, and Malas. HTS put its fighters throughout the province on high alert.

On 23 June, according to pro-government Al-Masdar News, fighting began between the two sides. The Guardians of Religion Organization captured Idlib Central Prison, and the Kansarwah factory, as well as several housing blocks west of Idlib city. Clashes continued until the end of the day, temporarily halting before resuming the following day.

On 24 June, the two sides brought in vehicles and soldiers to their areas and checkpoints. HTS attacked the So Be Steadfast Operations Room's stronghold of Arab Said with tanks and artillery, leading to clashes between the two sides with heavy weapons, while clashes resumed west of Idlib city. Hurras al-Din fighters attacked the Al-Yaqoubiya village checkpoint, and seized control from Tahrir al-Sham. Janudiyah was also seized. Multiple roads between towns witnessing fighters were cut, as civilians fled from Arab Said, which witnessed heavy fighting. Nine fighters from either side were killed, and four civilians were injured in the clashes. However, according to Al-Masdar, clashes continued around the western outskirts of Idlib as the Guardians of Religion Organization advanced towards the city reportedly capturing ground from HTS.

The next day on 25 June, the cease-fire collapsed, with clashes resuming west of Idlib as Hay'at Tahrir al-Sham strengthened its positions with gear, soldiers, and vehicles. Meanwhile, HTS brought in reinforcements for a new assault on Arab Said. On the same day a former rebel fighter from the Suqour al-Sham Brigades was injured and died from his injuries during clashes west of Idlib city, when a stray artillery shell landed near his home in the village of Ma'artin. Clashes continued through the day as both HTS and the So Be Steadfast Operations Room exchanged shelling west of Idlib around Arab Saeed, during the clashes five Guardians of Religion Organizations fighters were killed and four HTS fighters were also killed. After intervention from Shuria men and elders in the Jisr ash-Shugur countryside, Hurras al-Din withdrew from the Al-Yaqoubiya checkpoint and headed to areas near the villages of al-Harameh and Zarzour. As heavy fighting continued in Arab Said, HTS managed to recapture the Idlib Central Prison from HaD, and stationed heavy weapons and vehicles at the site. One tracked vehicle was destroyed by HaD during the clashes. The death count rose to 19, with 12 HaD and nine HTS fighters confirmed dead.

On 26 June, clashes once again resumed after an initial calm. HTS advanced in the Arab Said area, capturing the water purification station and the Armanaz well. Hurras al-Din released an official statement announcing its willingness to remove the checkpoints under the condition that negotiations be held regarding the prisoners, and a judicial commission take up the issues raised. The two sides reportedly reached a new agreement: Hurras al-Din fighters could stay in Arab Said with their weapons, and anyone who wished to leave would be allowed to. The captured leaders would be tried by the Turkestan Islamic Party. The organization pledged to close all its headquarters and vow not to set up any more checkpoints. HaD was also to withdraw from all territory captured from HTS. The So Be Steadfast Operation Room's fighters were allowed to withdraw to rebel-held areas of Latakia, where some of its affiliates were stationed.

== Aftermath ==
Despite the ceasefire, HTS attacked checkpoints of the So Be Steadfast coalition in al-Hamameh village and its surrounding areas, and in the Sarmada border area, while also raiding headquarters in Sarmada and Sahel. Hurras al-Din condemned the actions, calling them a "treachery" which may revoke the agreements if they continued.

HTS resumed its actions against The Guardians of Religion Organization, sending out a statement declaring that all factions were to unify after the Fateh Mubin operations room, preventing any other coalitions from being formed and operating in Idlib governorate. On 28 June HTS stormed Arab Said and arrested prominent HaD commander Abu Omar Manhaj.

== Reactions ==
- Al-Qaeda – Al-Qaeda's general command issued a statement condemning HTS and calling for the group to cease its actions. It also urged fighters to disobey orders to carry out attacks.
- Hay'at Tahrir al-Sham – A spokesperson of Hay'at Tahrir al-Sham called the behavior of HaD "unacceptable". Pro-HTS Ebaa news agency accused the group of robbing civilians and surrounding the house of the former head of the Syrian Salvation Government. Other media accused al-Talli of trying to split the ranks of HTS.
- So Be Steadfast Operations Room – a spokesperson for the operations room accused HTS of escalating the situation. Abu al-Abd Ashidaa, the leader of Jihad Coordination, issued a message on his Telegram channel saying "After Tahrir al-Sham arrested immigrants and jihad leaders, and its failure to comply with sharia, and its insistence on arrogance and aggression, the 'Be Steadfast' factions put their barriers west of Idlib to stop the arrests." He stated that the operations room didn't want a fight, but warned it had the ability to defend itself and spread its influence across Idlib.

== See also ==
- Tahrir al-Sham–Jundullah conflict
