= Syrian Liberation Front–Tahrir al-Sham conflict =

2018 military operation of the Syrian civil war

- Part of the inter-rebel conflict during the Syrian Civil War
- Situation in Aleppo Governorate and Idlib Governorate on 18 April 2018. Tahrir al-Sham and allies control Syrian Liberation Front and allies control Turkish-backed Free Syrian Army control Syrian Army control SDF control Syrian Army & SDF control
Date	19 February – 24 April 2018 (2 months and 5 days)
Location	Aleppo Governorate and Idlib Governorate, Syria
Result	Inconclusive: Tahrir al-Sham (HTS) controls nearly 70 percent of Idlib province, including the Turkish border, as well as areas of western Aleppo; SLF and the Suqour al-Sham Brigades capture many cities, towns and villages from Tahrir al-Sham

Belligerents
Syrian Liberation Front; Suqour al-Sham Brigades	Syrian Salvation Government; Turkistan Islamic Party in Syria

Commanders and leaders
Hassan Soufan (SLF general commander); Inad Darwaish (Ahrar al-Sham military commander); Khaled Omar Abu al-Yaman; Abu Walid al-Homsi † (prominent commander of Nour al-Din al-Zenki Movement); Naif Hamatu †; Abu Turab al-Masri †	Ahmed al-Sharaa; Abu Abdullah al-Iraqi (Aleppo sector leader); Fawaz al-Asfar †; Abu Abdul Rahman al-Maghrebi (MIA); Abu Ahed Taqiqa †; Abu Ouways al-Maghrbi †; Abu al-Yaman al-Ansari † Bashir al-Shahnah †

Units involved
Ahrar al-Sham; Revolutionaries of Atarib; Army of Mujahideen; Atarib Martyrs Brigade; Nour al-Din al-Zenki Movement; Levant Revolutionaries Battalions	Hay'at Tahrir al-Sham

Strength
1,000 fighters	1,500 fighters 30 tanks

Casualties and losses
174–225 killed	231–750 killed
- 26 civilians killed

On 19 February 2018, heavy clashes erupted between the newly established Syrian Liberation Front, which consists of Ahrar al-Sham and the Nour al-Din al-Zenki Movement, backed by the Suqour al-Sham Brigades, and Hay'at Tahrir al-Sham (HTS) in the western Aleppo Governorate. The conflict soon spread to the Idlib Governorate and the SLF captured several towns from HTS. A ceasefire between the two groups was reached on 24 April 2018. Fighting again resumed on 1 January 2019, ending with a total HTS military victory on 9 January.

== Background ==
Tahrir al-Sham was formed by five Salafi rebel groups in Syria, including the al-Nusra Front and the Nour al-Din al-Zenki Movement, on 28 January 2017. During clashes between Tahrir al-Sham and Ahrar al-Sham, however, Nour al-Din al-Zenki refused to fight Ahrar al-Sham and defected from HTS. Violent clashes then erupted between Zenki and HTS in western Aleppo and northern Idlib between August and November 2017.

On 18 February 2018, Ahrar al-Sham and the Nour al-Din al-Zenki Movement announced a merger which established the Syrian Liberation Front. According to Sam Heller of the International Crisis Group, the formation of the Syrian Liberation Front was an attempt by Ahrar al-Sham and the Zenki Movement to create a "counterweight" against the dominance of Tahrir al-Sham in northwestern Syria. HTS reportedly prepared to attack Zenki prior to the merger.

Hay'at Tahrir al-Sham released a statement condemning Nour al-Din al-Zenki Movement and calling them 'aggressors' and liars about their willingness to resolve inter-rebel disputes in a Sharia court as well as calling them traitors, the statement also said this is part of a long series of conflicts with the Zenki movement and listed several incidents of times the Zenki movement acted against Tahrir al-Sham. Allegations included recruiting former Syrian Democratic Forces and YPG fighters to fight Tahrir al-Sham as well as attacks on bases belonging to Tahrir al-Sham. The statement also said that the Zenki movement planted IEDs and attempted to assassinate Tahrir Al-Sham members via this method, and that they are responsible for killing a Tahrir Al-Sham official named Abu Ayman Al-Masri after attacking a court house, a child, and a teacher from a religious college. The statement also said that the Zenki movement is being hypocritical regarding affairs in Idlib and the siege in East Ghouta by not sending fighters to Ghouta but rather deploying them to attack Tahrir al-Sham, they also condemned the Zenki movement for their support of de-escalation zones. Ahrar al-Sham also released a statement about their support for the Nour al-Din al-Zenki Movement and plans to expel Tahrir al-Sham from the area. The Nour al-Din al-Zenki Movement denied the claims made by HTS such as assisting YPG fighters in fighting HTS, as well as the claims about killing HTS members, with the group's spokesman stating the deaths occurred as a result of mistaken identities and confusion over whom the individuals killed actually were.

Observers have said that the conflict is possibly being used by Turkey as an opportunity to expand influence over the area with groups aligned with Turkish interests in the area whilst liquidating hard-line groups such as HTS and Al-Qaeda.

== Conflict ==
=== First phase ===
The conflict was triggered by the assassination of HTS commander Abu Ayman al-Masri on 16 February 2018, by Nour al-Din al-Zenki. The commander's wife was also wounded during the attack that killed him.

==== February ====
On 19 February 2018, a day after the Syrian Liberation Front was established, clashes erupted between the SLF and HTS in western Aleppo and northern Idlib. By 21 February, the SLF, with support from Suqour al-Sham, captured the city of Maarrat al-Nu'man, the towns of Ariha and Tramla, and the Wadi Deif military base near Maarrat al-Nu'man following HTS withdrawal. Meanwhile, in western Aleppo, HTS captured the villages of Kafr Laha, Basratun, Uwayjil and Taqad from the SLF.
On social media, both groups accused each other of spreading fake news. HTS's official media outlet claimed on Telegram that "There are no problems between us and Ahrar al-Sham", and that Ahrar al-Sham fighters assisting the Nour al-Din al-Zenki Movement are "nothing more than individuals whose motivations are clear." This was said despite Ahrar al-Sham as a whole merging with the Nour al-Din al-Zenki Movement in forming the Syrian Liberation Front.

On 20 February the Syrian Liberation Front accused Tahrir al-Sham of capturing its members at checkpoints.

On 24 February, Hassan Soufan, general commander of the Syrian Liberation Front, called on the Sham Legion, who did not comment on the clashes, to side with the SLF against HTS.

During a brief battle on 26 February, mere hours after the loss of Darat Izza to the SLF, HTS reportedly captured the largest base of Ahrar al-Sham, Khirbet Bantanta Military Camp, located in northern Idlib province, thus securing a large stash of weaponry, including 20 tanks, towed artillery pieces, multiple rocket launchers, self-propelled guns and infantry fighting vehicles.

On 27 February, HTS withdrew from the city of Khan Shaykhun, and was expelled from western Aleppo, although it repelled the SLF advance on al-Dana. During the last day of February, HTS launched a large-scale counter-offensive, capturing settlements of Kafr Losen, Aqrabat, Deir Hassan, and Qah, as well as attacking the town of Atmeh.

HTS also handed over Morek to the Army of Glory and the SLF.

==== March ====
On 1 March, HTS released between 150 and 180 ISIL fighters captured during the Northwestern Syria campaign (October 2017–February 2018) by the Army of Victory and the Army of Glory to help in the fight against the SLF. Tahrir al-Sham recaptured Reef al-Muhandisin in the Aleppo Governorate, and a weapons depot there exploded. Syrian Civil Defense reported that they recovered bodies of eight individuals, while the reports claim that 20 were killed and eight wounded in the explosion.

On 2 March, Tahrir al-Sham advanced to the outskirts of the SLF stronghold of Atarib with an estimated 1,500 fighters and 30 tanks, along with other vehicles. However, Tahrir al-Sham fighters retreated from their staging positions after dozens of civilians demonstrated against the attack on Atarib. The head of Atarib's local council stated that they have reached an agreement with Tahrir al-Sham, which stated that the group will not enter Atarib. Multiple factions operating in Atarib, including the Atarib Martyrs Brigade, the Sham Legion, and Ahrar al-Sham, formed a unified military formation named the Revolutionaries of Atarib, consisting of over a thousand of fighters. The new formation stated that its goal is to protect Atarib from any aggressor. In Idlib, Abdullah al-Muhaysini and Musallah al-Olayan announced the formation of the Aba Union for foreign jihadist fighters to remain focused on fighting the Syrian government and not get involved in the infighting while still remaining in their respective factions.

The newly formed al-Qaeda faction Guardians of Religion Organization, specifically, Jaysh al-Sahel, threatened to engage the SLF if they attack certain villages.

As Atarib was surrounded on all sides by HTS, HTS has also announced plans to take Darat Izza and the Aleppo suburbs by force. The next day, the SLF took control of three in northern Aleppo and northwest Idlib, near Afrin. Hussam Atrash the head of the SLF political bureau posted on Twitter threats of further violence against HTS. Several tribal forces are to be deployed to Idlib from Turkey after clan leaders in Urfa had a meeting with Turkish President Recep Tayyip Erdogan to discuss the framework and development of a council. The tribal fighters are being sent to Idlib on an unspecified date to support the Turkish military operation in Afrin in an interview a representative from the tribal fighters was asked about the situation in Idlib to which he said "we were asked to be ready to go there (Idlib)" he added, "If there is an internal order to fight HTS, we will participate".

On 3 March, the SLF (specifically the Nour al-Din al-Zenki) took advantage of HTS forces being off-balance. Attacked west of Kafr Nabl, the SLF captured three towns along a road, further isolating HTS garrisons in southern Idlib governorate. A media channel linked to SLF and Suqour al-Sham claimed the killing of 3 HTS commanders in Jabal Zawiya.

On 4 March, HTS launched a large-scale counter-offensive in Idlib and Aleppo, reportedly recapturing 50 towns and villages. During the HTS counter offensive SLF destroyed 3 tanks and 1 BMP while damaging 2 tanks using TOW missiles. Tahrir al-Sham captured Taqad and Saadiyah villages in western Aleppo from SLF. SLF stated that they destroyed 6 tanks from Tahrir al-Sham during the past two days in Taqad and Saadiyah. Clashes between the two in Shamiku village reportedly killed three and wounded three civilians.

On 7 March, Tahrir al-Sham captured settlements of Kafr Naha, al-Sa’adiyah and A’jil from SLF in the Aleppo Governorate, as well as housing complexes of al-Arman, al-Fursan and al-Rahal.

On 8 March, reports emerged Tahrir al-Sham released 50 Jund al-Aqsa members.

On 11 March, fighting resumed and several SLF members surrendered to HTS.

On 17 March, Faylaq al-Sham mediated a ceasefire agreement between Tahrir al-Sham and the Syrian Liberation Front. The agreement includes release of prisoners on both sides, cessation of attacks, and opening of roads leading to the front lines with the Syrian Arab Army and its allies.

=== Second phase ===
==== March ====
On 19 March, two days after the cease fire agreement Ahrar al-Sham arrested a Tahrir al-Sham commander named Yusuf al-Abdullah as he was trying to flee areas under control of the Syrian Army in the Hama Governorate, he was reportedly trying to flee to Lebanon.

On 22 March, reports emerged that Tahrir al-Sham and SLF are expected to resume clashing soon, as the temporary ceasefire ended today as the parties were unable to successfully negotiate a truce. Suqour al-Sham blamed Hayat Tahrir al-Sham's leader, Abu Muhammad al-Jolani for the cease fire falling apart because he refused the SLF's proposals and demanded that SLF hands over localities they captured from Tahrir al-Sham.

On 23 March, Tahrir al-Sham clashed with SLF in the western part of the Aleppo Governorate, 100 people gathered to demonstrate against Tahrir al-Sham in Atarib near the headquarters of Tahrir al-Sham and they opened fire on the demonstrators injuring one while they shelled the 46th regiment base. On the same day unknown gunmen stormed the headquarters of the Sham Legion in Idlib killing four of their members there is evidence that suggests that Jund al-Aqsa is behind the attack which has cells and remnants active in Tahrir al-Sham, Guardians of the Religion organization, the Turkistan Islamic Party, as well as a new group consisting of 300 former members of the group called Ansar al-Tawhid. Turkish President Recep Tayyip Erdogan told US President Donald Trump and Russian President Vladimir Putin that after the military operation in Afrin is complete that his next goal is to take both Idlib and Manbij.

On 24 March, a car bomb detonated near a hospital in Idlib killing 7 and injuring 25 no one has claimed responsibility for the attack, several have accused Pro-Islamic State cells for the attack. Clashes occurred in the Aleppo Governorate, and Tahrir al-Sham shelled Syrian Liberation Front held positions there as well. In the Hama Governorate mass demonstrations were held in the town of Murak against The Army of Glory and the Syrian Liberation Front after Tahrir al-Sham handed over the town to the two groups, the protestors demanded allocation of 20% of the revenues from a crossing connecting rebel held territory to government held territory, currently Ahrar al-Sham receives 60% while the Army of Glory receives the other 40%, after the protests Ahrar al-Sham decided to give 5% to the council.

On 26 March, in the Idlib Governorate anti-HTS forces began pushing towards the Latakia Governorate to connect a pocket held by Ahrar al-Sham and began advancing towards the Hama Governorate.

On 27 March, the Syrian Liberation Front repelled an assault by Tahrir al-Sham in the Aleppo Governorate however HTS managed to kill two commanders from SLF while SLF was able to kill 6 HTS elements. Three civilians died as a result of SLF and HTS shelling one another in Darat Izza. In the Dara Governorate demonstrations were held demanding that Tahrir al-Sham withdraw from a locality in hopes of keeping the area neutral in the conflict. On 28 March, SLF fully captured Bisrtoun village in western Aleppo from HTS. In the Idlib Governorate HTS successfully repelled SLF and Suqour al-Sham assaults on three villages. In the Dara Governorate the protests continued against HTS however the protesters rejected military action.

On 29 March, HTS kidnapped the director of the Morek crossing in hopes to promote a prisoner exchange with SLF, however SLF did not respond to HTS. On 30 March, in the western parts of the Aleppo Governorate protests were held against HTS, its leader, well as the Assad Government. While in the Idlib Governorate protests were also held demanding that Turkey intervenes in the Governorate.

On 31 March, clashes occurred around Darat Izza between SLF and HTS. In the Idlib and Hama Governorates HTS raided several SLF positions and arrested 3 individuals part of the group.

==== April ====
On 1 April, another cease-fire was mediated by the Sham Legion and several scholars, the cease-fire also included Suqour al-Sham and began at 6:00pm Syrian time. On 2 April, fighting resumed between SLF and HTS, SLF accused HTS of detaining members of a delegate that were supposed to meet with a delegation from HTS.

On 4 April, several civic activists, scholars, and other community leaders launched an initiative called the "Union of Popular Initiatives" and they call on both SLF and HTS to stop fighting, SLF has stated they agree with the initiative, HTS has remained silent on it.

On 7 April, the Sham Legion negotiated another cease-fire agreement between Tahrir al-Sham and the Syrian Liberation Front. The cease-fire is set to last a week and both parties are expected to come to a longterm agreement.

On 9 April, There was an explosion in the vicinity of the Al-Rahman mosque in a neighborhood of Idlib. At least ten civilians were killed and more than 50 were wounded by the explosion; the perpetrators are unknown.

On 11 April, Tahrir al-Sham arrested incoming Jaysh al-Islam commanders that evacuated to Idlib after the Rif Dimashq offensive (February–April 2018), due to per-existing rivalries between the two. On 12 April, gunmen from an unknown group attacked a checkpoint in the city of Qalaat al-Madiq in the Hama Governorate that was run by the Free Syrian Army's Army of Victory, one gunman and one Army of Victory member were killed.

On 15 April, Tahrir al-Sham launched a massive offensive against the Syrian Liberation Front and Suqour al-Sham in the southern part of the Idlib Governorate, capturing several towns and villages, the SLF and Suqour al-Sham were able to repel an attack on Maarat al-Numaan and there are unconfirmed reports that they also retook Khan Shaykhun and Murak. Since the start of the conflict in February, at least 196 members of Hay'at Tahrir al-Sham and 148 members of Jabhat Tahrir Souriya have been killed in southern Idlib and western Aleppo provinces, according to SOHR, amidst heavy clashes between the dominant opposition groups.

On 16 April, the Syrian Liberation Front recaptured a few villages in western Aleppo from Tahrir al-Sham and claims to have killed 3 individuals linked to the Turkistan Islamic Party in Syria.

By 18 April, casualties in Idlib since the start of fighting on 18 February (according to pro-rebel media) had reached 750 HTS fighters killed, 225 SLF fighters killed, and 3,000 fighters on both sides wounded. 10 tanks and five other armored vehicles were also destroyed.

On 19 April, there was an explosion outside a mosque in Idlib city, on the same day demonstrations against HTS were held in Sarmada after HTS was accused of abusing a shop owner there, HTS opened fire injuring five civilians.

On 24 April, both groups signed another cease fire agreement, agreeing to end all aggression, the leaders of both groups Soufan and Joulani both signed the agreement.

==== Post-ceasefire assassinations ====
On 26 April, several assassinations took place targeting both HTS and SLF as well as the Turkistan Islamic Party in Syria, several reports have indicated Jund al-Aqsa cells are behind the assassinations.

On 27 April, after a mass assassination campaign against multiple opposition groups in Idlib began, an IED was targeted Saudi cleric Abdullah al-Muhaysini near Saraqib after he was leaving a meeting to mediate a prisoner exchange between HTS and SLF. On the same day another IED exploded on a road near the village of Bir al-Tayib killing 4 civilians and injuring 2. The Syrian Salvation Government declared a state of emergency in Idlib. On 29 April, the assassinations for the 4th continued day, with the killing of 2 Hayyaat Tahrir Al-Sham members and a lieutenant from the SAA who defected, by an IED. According to the SOHR over 30 people have died in selective assassinations after the ceasefire took place.

On 1 May, unknown gunmen assassinated a member of HTS.

On 3 May, a VBIED detonated outside the International Rescue Committee in the town of Al-Dana, Syria killing 4 and wounding dozens. Another IED was detonated in Saraqib killing 1 and injuring three, an IED also detonated targeting a vehicle belonging to the Sham Legion killing 4 of their members. HTS raided an ISIL meeting in the city of Kafr Nabl which resulted in clashes between members of the two groups, two ISIL members were killed while one HTS member was killed.

== Aftermath ==
In January 2019, rebel infighting flared back up again as HTS seized control of dozens of villages from Nour al-Din al-Zenki, forcing National Front for Liberation to sign a ceasefire deal. . HTS seized control of Idlib province on 10 January right after the ceasefire.

== See also ==
- al-Nusra Front–SRF/Hazzm Movement conflict
- October 2016 Idlib Governorate clashes
- Idlib Governorate clashes (January–March 2017)
- Idlib Governorate clashes (July 2017)
- East Ghouta inter-rebel conflict (April–May 2017)
