= Hassan Soufan =

Syrian rebel leader and politician (born 1977)

- حسن صوفان

Member of the People's Assembly
- Incumbent
- Assumed office 1 July 2026
- Appointed by: Ahmed al-Sharaa

Governor of Latakia
- In office 17 December 2024 – December 2024
- Preceded by: Khaled Walid Abaza
- Succeeded by: Mohammed Othman

Leader of Ahrar al-Sham
- In office 31 July 2017 – August 2018
- Preceded by: Ali al-Omar
- Succeeded by: Jaber Ali Basha

Personal details
- Born: Hassan Muhammad Salim Soufan; 1977 (age 48–49) Latakia, Syria
- Party: Independent
- Education: Latakia University (BA)
- Nickname: Abu al-Bara

Military service
- Allegiance: Ahrar al-Sham; Syrian Liberation Front; National Front for Liberation
- Years of service: 2017–2025
- Battles/wars: Syrian Civil War; Syrian Liberation Front–Tahrir al-Sham conflict; Northwestern Syria offensive (April–August 2019)

Hassan Muhammad Salim Soufan (Arabic: حسن صوفان; born 1977), also known by his nom de guerre as Abu al-Bara (Arabic: أبو البراء), is a Syrian government official and former rebel leader who participated in the Syrian Civil War. He was appointed as the leader of Ahrar al-Sham and held the position from July 2017 until his resignation in August 2018. He also served as the general commander of the Syrian Liberation Front, assuming the post in early 2018. He later appointed as the governor of Latakia Governorate in December 2024 after the fall of the Assad regime, before being succeeded by Mohammed Othman that same month.

== Biography ==
=== Early life ===
Hassan Soufan was born in the year 1977 in the coastal Syrian city of Latakia and had fully memorized the Quran at a young age.

=== Pre-war activities ===
Soufan had received a degree in economics from the Tishreen University. He had lived in Saudi Arabia and studied Islamic theology while there under scholars including Muhammad ibn al Uthaymeen and Abdullah Ibn Jibreen, until Soufan's arrest in 2005 by Saudi authorities and deportation back to Syria. Upon returning to Syria he was held in the Sednaya Prison and took part in a riot there in 2008 taking several guards hostage and later negotiated their release with Syrian officials, during his time in prison he associated with factions in the prison that would later go on to form al-Nusra and ISIL. A former fellow prisoner who knew Soufan who has become an activist has described Soufan as a moderate saying he disagrees with the approaches and positions taken by al-Nusra and ISIL but does not intend to fight them or any other Islamic factions and he is against infighting, and views issue such as Takfir as among the most complex issues in Islamic theology. The activist also claimed that Soufan's ideology is the same as Ahrar al-Sham's early leadership.

=== Syrian Civil War ===
He was released from prison in late-December 2016 following a prisoner swap between the Syrian government and the rebels, and was appointed the leader of Ahrar al-Sham in mid-2017. He has promised a revival of Ahrar al-Sham and has blamed the former leadership of the group for its decline. In 2018 he was made the general commander of the Syrian Liberation Front, a merger of Ahrar al-Sham and the Nour al-Din al-Zenki Movement which later came into conflict with Hayat Tahrir al-Sham shortly after its formation in February 2018. In August 2018 he resigned from his position as the leader of Ahrar al-Sham.

In May 2019, he resigned from his position as the leader of the National Front for Liberation as well as his position in Ahrar al-Sham for unknown reasons, he stated the reasons were personal, he also stated he was committed to fighting and would continue to participate in the Syrian Civil War.
