= Ansar al-Din =

Ansar al-Din may refer to:

- Ansar Dine, an Islamist militant organization based in Mali.
- Ansar al-Din Front, an Islamist militant organization based in Syria.
