= So Be Steadfast Operations Room =

Militant group

- Arabic: فاثبتوا; Fathbito
- Dates active: 12 June 2020 – 31 January 2025
- Groups: Ansar al-Din Front (until 2025); Ansar Fighters Brigade (until 2022); Hurras al-Din (until 2025); Jihad Coordination (until 2023); Jama'at Ansar al-Islam (until 2021)
- Active regions: Idlib Governorate, Syria; Latakia Governorate, Syria
- Ideology: Salafi jihadism
- Status: Dissolved
- Wars: Syrian civil war

The So Be Steadfast Operations Room (Arabic: فاثبتوا, romanized: Fathbito) (also commonly translated as Be Steadfast and Holdout) was a coalition of Salafist jihadist insurgent groups in Idlib Governorate, Syria during the Syrian civil war.

== Composition ==
The coalition included Hurras al-Din, Ansar al-Din Front, Jihad Coordination and the Ansar Fighters Brigade.

Jama'at Ansar al-Islam left the operations room in 2021. Ansar Fighters Brigade left the operations room in 2022. Jihad Coordination left the operations room in 2023.

== History ==
Hay'at Tahrir al-Sham (HTS) arrested Abu Salah al-Uzbeki, the founder of Katibat al-Tawhid wal-Jihad, who had defected from HTS and joined Ansar al-Din, on 17 June 2020, while Abu al-Malik al-Talli, another defector from HTS, was arrested on 22 June. So Be Steadfast called for their release and fighting broke out that same day. Infighting between the two factions spread to various towns, including "‘Arab Sa’id, al-Hamamah, al-Ya’qubiyah, Jdaydah, Armanaz, Kuku, and Shaykh Bahar."

The alliance briefly took over Idlib Central Prison in Arab Said. An agreement was signed following the fighting in which Hurras al-Din could not establish checkpoints and needed permission from the Al-Fatah al-Mubin operations room before launching attacks. The operations room was forced to close its various "military bases." al-Uzbeki was released by HTS in March 2021, while al-Talli was also released that year.

== See also ==
- Tahrir al-Sham–Jundullah conflict
