= Chinese Embassy in Bishkek bombing =

2016 attack in Kyrgyzstan

Coordinates: 42°52′22″N 74°34′04″E

- Part of Xinjiang conflict
- Location: Bishkek, Kyrgyzstan
- Date: 30 August 2016; 9:30 a.m.
- Target: Chinese Embassy in Bishkek
- Attack type: Suicide car bombing
- Deaths: 1 (the perpetrator)
- Injuries: 3

On 30 August 2016, a car rammed through the gates of the Chinese Embassy in Bishkek, Kyrgyzstan, and exploded. The driver of the car (a suicide bomber) was killed; three embassy employees were injured.

== Details ==
The three people wounded were all Kyrgyz citizens who worked at the embassy. The bomber is believed to be a Uyghur, an ethnic group primarily living in the Xinjiang region of China, and has reportedly been engaged in an insurgency in China for decades.

The suicide bomber was the only fatality from the attack. Three Kyrgyz staff members were wounded. The vehicle used was a Mitsubishi Delica. Nusra allied Syrian based Uighurs were involved in the Kyrgyzstan Chinese embassy bombing. A Kyrgyzstan government agency pointed the finger at Nusra allied Syrian based Uighurs. The embassy bombing was ordered by Sirojiddin Mukhtarov aka Abu Salah al-Uzbeki who commands Katibat al-Tawhid wal-Jihad in Nusra Front alongside Uighurs in Syria. Khalilova Zoira, an ethnic Uighur ETIM agent, was the perpetrator of the bombing. Zoir Khalimov was also given as his name.

== Aftermath ==
Three people were sentenced in connection with the attack. Khasamidin Ismailov was sentenced to 18 years in prison while Hikmatillo Abdulazhanov and Kunazim Mansirova, described as "brother and sister" by Zanoza.kg, were sentenced to 10 years in prison. In addition, in July 2022, the Chinese embassy was hit by a fake bomb threat along with the Russian embassy in Bishkek.
