= Abdul Jashari =

Macedonian Albanian militant

Abdul Samrez Jashari (Arabic: عبدل صمريز يشاري, Macedonian: Абдул Самрез Јашари; born 25 September 1976), also known by his nom de guerre Abu Qatada al-Albani (Arabic: أبو قتادة الألباني), is a Macedonian Albanian militant who is the leader of Xhemati Alban, an Albanian Islamist armed group allied with Hay'at Tahrir al-Sham (HTS) which is active in the Syrian civil war. Prior to 2017, Jashari and Xhemati Alban were allied to HTS's predecessor the al-Qaeda-affiliated al-Nusra Front. Following the fall of the Assad regime and the establishment of the Syrian transitional government, Jashari was promoted to the rank of colonel in the new Syrian Army.

Jashari was designated a terrorist by the United States Treasury Department in 2016 for his affiliation with al-Nusra.

== See also ==
- Albanians in Syria
