= Abu al-Malik al-Talli =

Jamal Zainia, commonly known by his nom de guerre Abu al-Malik al-Talli, is the head of the Ansar Fighters Brigade in Syria.

== Life ==
Al-Talli was held in Sednaya prison and other prisons for over eight years until his 2011 release.

He was considered a high-ranking member of al-Nusra Front.

It was speculated in December 2014 that al-Talli could join the Islamic State due to his close relations with them.

Al-Talli reportedly allowed his deputies, Abu Musab and Abu Sahib, to lead the Qalamoun offensive (May–June 2015), though they were inexperienced in direct combat.

He was part of Hay'at Tahrir al-Sham (HTS) until he left the organization in 2020. According to an article published by the Middle East Institute, he withdrew his resignation prior to his arrest.

The So Be Steadfast Operations Room was formed in June 2020 by the Ansar Fighters Brigade (which he heads) and other groups, which precipitated his arrest that same month. His arrest on 22 June at his house in Sarmada led to infighting between HTS and other militant groups. Al-Talli was released that year.
