= Xhemati Alban =

Sunni Albanian militant group

- Flag of Xhemati Alban
- Leader: Abdul Jashari
- Founded: 2012; 14 years ago
- Dates active: 2017–present
- Country: Syria
- Allegiance: Tahrir al-Sham (Until 2025)
- Active regions: Idlib Governorate, Northern Aleppo
- Ideology: Sunni Islamism; Salafism; Jihadism; Syrian opposition
- Size: 60-100+

Xhemati Alban (Arabic: جماعة الألبان) is a Sunni Albanian jihadi group composed primarily of ethnic Albanians from Kosovo, Albania, North Macedonia, and the broader Balkan diaspora. Operating mainly in the Idlib Governorate and northern Aleppo regions of Syria, the group is considered a subunit of Hay'at Tahrir al-Sham (HTS), a prominent Syrian militant organization.

== History ==
Established in the early 2010s, Xhemati Alban initially aligned with the al-Qaeda-affiliated al-Nusra Front before transitioning to HTS following the latter's formation. The group has actively participated in various operations within the Syrian civil war, notably in the 2015 Idlib offensive, which led to the capture of Idlib city by rebel forces. Their involvement has included sniper operations and training, contributing to their reputation for precision and effectiveness.

== Leadership ==
The group is led by Abdul Jashari, also known as Abu Qatada al-Albani. Born on 25 September 1976, in Skopje, North Macedonia, Jashari serves as a close military advisor to HTS leader Ahmed al-Sharaa. In 2016, the U.S. Treasury Department designated Jashari as a terrorist, citing his role in fundraising for Al-Nusra Front fighters and his leadership in military operations in northern Syria.

== Activities and operations ==
Xhemati Alban's membership is estimated to be between two dozen and several hundred fighters, with a significant portion specializing in sniper operations. The group has been involved in various military engagements, including operations in the Kabani region of the Latakia Governorate and the 2024 Syrian offensive. They are known for their expertise in sniper tactics, utilizing modified Mosin Nagant rifles and heavy-caliber weapons like the AM-50 Sayyad anti-materiel rifle.

== Funding and logistics ==
The group reportedly receives funding and support from HTS. Additionally, their subgroup, Albanian Tactical, offers training and tactical advice, potentially broadening their funding sources.

== Propaganda and recruitment ==
Xhemati Alban actively utilizes social media platforms to disseminate propaganda aimed at audiences in the Balkans. These materials often feature training exercises, combat footage, and messages promoting their jihadist ideology. The group's content is primarily in Albanian, with some materials offering English subtitles.

== Current status and outlook ==
As of 2025, Xhemati Alban continues to operate in Syria, maintaining its alliance with HTS. The group's current membership is estimated to be around 60-100+ individuals, specializing in various areas of weaponry.

== See also ==
- Islamism and Islamic terrorism in the Balkans
