= Green Battalion =

2013–2014 Syrian jihadist group

- الكتيبة الخضراء al-Katiba al-Khadra
- Logo (above) & flag (below) of the Green Battalion
- Leader: Abu Muhjin al-Omani †
- Dates active: August 2013 - ~ October 2014
- Active regions: Damascus Governorate, Syria; Homs Governorate, Syria
- Ideology: Salafist jihadism
- Part of: Jabhat Ansar al-Din
- Wars: Syrian Civil War

The Green Battalion (Arabic: الكتيبة الخضراء, al-Katiba al-Khadra) was a jihadist group that was active during the Syrian Civil War. Formed in 2013 by a group of Saudi veterans of the Iraq War and Afghanistan war, the group fought alongside Jabhat al-Nusra and the Islamic State of Iraq and the Levant (ISIL) against Syrian government forces, while remaining independent and neutral in the dispute between ISIL and other groups. The group announced on 25 July 2014 that it became part of Jabhat Ansar al-Din. The group claimed allegiance to Jaish al-Muhajireen wal-Ansar around October 2014.

== See also ==
- List of armed groups in the Syrian Civil War
