= Ansar Fighters Brigade =

Militant group

- Arabic: Liwa’ al-Muqatilin al-Ansar
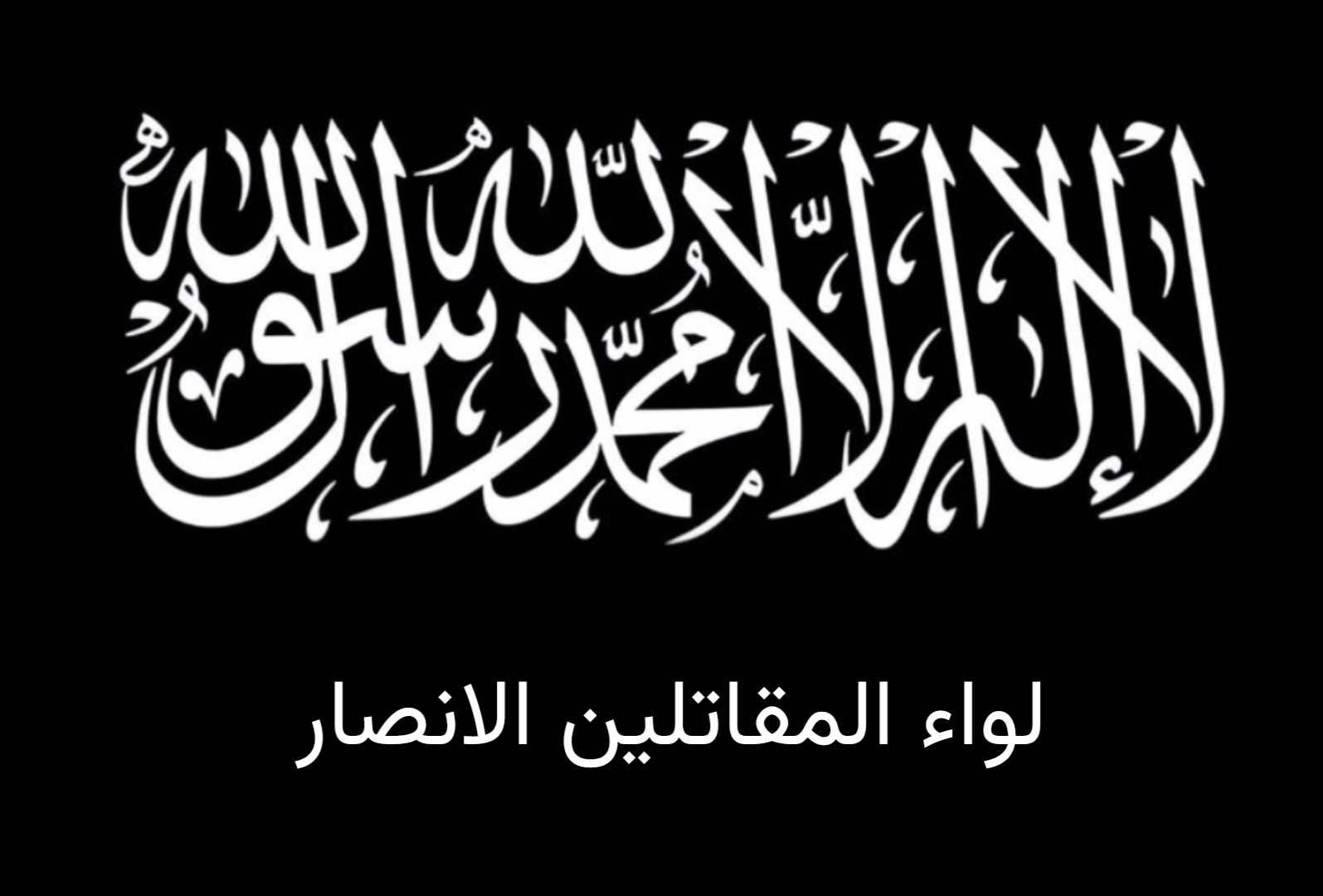
- Leader: Abu al-Malik al-Talli
- Dates active: ca. April 2020 – September 2022
- Active regions: Idlib Governorate, Syria; Latakia Governorate, Syria
- Ideology: Salafi jihadism
- Status: Dissolved
- Part of: So Be Steadfast Operations Room
- Wars: Syrian civil war

The Ansar Fighters Brigade (Arabic: Liwa’ al-Muqatilin al-Ansar) is a Salafist jihadist group in Idlib Governorate, Syria during the Syrian civil war.

The head of the group, Abu al-Malik al-Talli, left Hay'at Tahrir al-Sham (HTS) in April 2020 in protest following a deal between Turkey and Russia that halted the Northwestern Syria offensive (December 2019 – March 2020).

Al-Talli was arrested by HTS on 22 June 2020 and was released later in the year.
