= Syrian Liberation Front =

Syrian Islamist rebel group

- Arabic: جبهة تحرير سوريا; Jabhat Tahrir Suriya
- The logo of the Syrian Liberation Front
- Leaders: Hassan Soufan (general commander); Sheikh Tawfiq Shahabuddin (deputy commander and Nour al-Din al-Zenki Movement commander); Hussam Atrash (head of political bureau); Capt. Khalid Abu Yaman (military commander); Jaber Ali Pasha ("Abu Bara") (Ahrar al-Sham deputy commander)
- Dates active: 18 February 2018 – 29 January 2025
- Groups: Ahrar al-Sham; Nour al-Din al-Zenki Movement(until 2019); Katibat al-'Iqaab; Sheikh Fadel al-Akel; Katibat al-Bayia Lillah; Katibat Usud al-Tawheed; Liwa al-Adiyat; Martyr Abu Omar Battalion
- Active regions: Syria: Idlib Governorate; Aleppo Governorate; Hama Governorate
- Ideology: Sunni Islamism
- Part of: Revolutionaries of Atarib (2018); Maarrat al-Nu'man Military Council (2018); National Front for Liberation (since August 2018)
- Wars: the Syrian Civil War

Syrian Liberation Front (Arabic: جبهة تحرير سوريا, romanized: Jabhat Tahrir Suriya, JTS) was a Syrian Islamist rebel group that was formed in early 2018 during Syrian civil war and was based out of the Aleppo Governorate in northwestern Syria.

== Leadership ==
Initially, Jaber Ali Pasha, deputy commander of Ahrar al-Sham, was nominated as the general commander of the Syrian Liberation Front. Sheikh Tawfiq Shahabuddin, commander of the Nour al-Din al-Zenki Movement, was named the deputy commander. Hussam Atrash and Captain Khalid Abu Yaman were appointed as the political and military commanders of the group. However, after hours of disputes over leadership positions, Hassan Soufan, general commander of Ahrar al-Sham, took over as the general commander of the group, replacing Jaber Ali Pasha. Elected in October 2017, Hassan Soufan was the leader of Ahrar al-Sham and stated he was determined to distinguish his movement from "criminal" and "corrupt" projects, such as "Hitish and Daesh".

== History ==
On 18 February 2018 Ahrar al-Sham and the Nour al-Din al-Zenki Movement merged and joined the Syrian Liberation Front. By doing so the SLF gained two of the largest Sunni Islamist rebel groups in northwestern Syria behind their main rival, Tahrir al-Sham. In their merger announcement both groups called on other rebel groups to join, and stated that the merger was a result of an initiative by the Syrian Islamic Council.

On 19 Feb 2018, the day after the merger, violent clashes erupted between the group and Tahrir al-Sham in the western Aleppo Governorate. The conflict soon spread to the Idlib Governorate where the SLF captured the city of Maarrat al-Nu'man, the towns of Ariha and Tramla, and the Wadi Deif military base from HTS on 21 February.

By 18 April, pro-SLF media reported that after 60 days of fighting, 750 Tahrir al-Sham fighters and 225 SLF and Suqour al-Sham Brigades fighters had been killed, 3,000 fighters from both sides had been wounded, and 15 armoured vehicles (most of them belonging to Tahrir al-Sham) had been destroyed. The fighting ended with a ceasefire and gains for both sides.

On 3 May 2018, the Syrian Liberation Front, Suqour al-Sham, Sham Legion, and the Free Idlib Army formed a military council in the SLF-held Maarrat al-Nu'man. The council stated that it will not allow other factions to be formed in the city.

On 1 August 2018, in an effort to strengthen its position in Idlib before the Syrian Arab Army turned its attention towards the province and to eliminate al-Qaida groups in the region, the Syrian Liberation Front, along with 6 other groups (Suqour al-Sham Brigades, Jaysh al-Ahrar, Damascus Gathering, Unit 82 SWAT Forces, Free Hayan Brigade, Free North Brigade) in the area joined the National Front for Liberation. Anad al-Darwish ("Abu al-Munathir"), considered to be Ahrar al-Sham's most powerful military commander, was named the National Front for Liberation's chief of staff. As one of the 17 members of the National Front for Liberation, the Syrian Liberation Front has access to resources, weapons, and training from the Turkish government. The Turkish Government has been backing the National Front for Liberation since its inception, and in turn has been backing the Syrian Liberation Front since joining the National Front for Liberation.

In January 2019, Nour al-Din al-Zenki withdrew to Afrin following the HTS-NLF conflict.
