= Kuku - Ein Eljaj =

Kuku - Ein Eljaj كوكو عين الجاج
- Village
- Location in Syria
- Coordinates: 36°4′47″N 36°33′13″E
- Country: Syria
- Governorate: Idlib
- District: Harem District
- Subdistrict: Kafr Takharim Nahiyah

Population (2004)
  - Total: 637
- Time zone: UTC+2 (EET)
  - Summer (DST): UTC+3 (EEST)
- City Qrya Pcode: C4160

Kuku - Ein Eljaj (Arabic: كوكو عين الجاج) is a Syrian village located in Kafr Takharim Nahiyah in Harem District, Idlib. According to the Syria Central Bureau of Statistics (CBS), Kuku - Ein Eljaj had a population of 637 in the 2004 census. It is a Druze village of the Jabal al-Sumaq region.
