= Katibat al-Tawhid wal-Jihad =

Jihadist militant organization in Syria

- Uzbek: Tavhid va jihod katibasi Kyrgyz: Катибат аль-Таухид ва аль-жихад Arabic: كتاب التوحيد والجهاد
- Flag of Katibat al-Tawhid wal-Jihad
- Founder: Sirojiddin Mukhtarov † (nom de guerre: Abu Salah al-Uzbeki)
- Leader: Ilmurad Khikmatov (nom de guerre: Abdul Aziz al-Uzbeki)
- Dates active: 2014—present
- Country: Syria
- Allegiance: (al-Qaeda) Al-Qaeda: Al-Nusra Front (2015—2017); Tahrir al-Sham (2017—2024) Syria (2024—present)
- Ideology: Jihadism
- Wars: War in Afghanistan (2001-2021); Syrian Civil war; Northwestern Syria offensive (April–June 2015); Turkish military operation in Idlib Governorate; 2024 Syrian opposition offensives; Battle of Aleppo (2024)

Katibat al-Tawhid wal-Jihad (Uzbek: Tavhid va jihod katibasi, Kyrgyz: Катибат аль-Таухид ва аль-жихад, romanized: Katibat al'-Taukhid va al'-zhikhad, Arabic: كتائب التوحيد والجهاد, romanized: Kitā'ib al-tawḥīd wa-al-jihād) is an Uzbek/Kyrgyz jihadist militant organization based in Syria.

== History ==
The group was established in Syria in 2014 by Sirojiddin Mukhtarov, and consists of mostly Uzbek and Kyrgyz nationals.

In 2015 the group, with the help of Al-Nusra Front and Ajnad al-Kavkaz, attempted to establish a de facto state in northwestern Syria. This was all after the fighting in Idlib province, specifically in the town of Jisr ash-Shughur.

In 2016 the group bombed the Chinese embassy in Kyrgyzstan, under Mukhtarov's orders. Three people were arrested and sentenced for aiding and abetting the bombing.

In 2019 the group hired hitmen to kill Aierken Saimaiti, a man who exposed a large money laundering scheme. Also in 2019, the group's Shura council voted unanimously to replace Mukhtarov with Ilmurad Khikmatov.

In 2021 two of the head propagandists of the organization were arrested in the town of Tanzim after attempting to recruit Uzbek school children to go to Syria to fight for the group.

In 2022 the United States designated the group a terrorist organization. Also the same year, in September, Mukhtarov, the original founder of the organization, was killed in a targeted airstrike by the Russian Air Force.

In 2023, a foreign supporter of the group in Philadelphia attempted to build an IED in order to bomb certain targets in support of the group. The group supplied the materials overseas.

In September 2024 it was reported that militants from the group were operating in the Afrin Region and reinforcing the Hamza Division, working closely with its head, Sayf Bulad, in advance of anticipated fighting with the Levant Front.

In April 2026, a 30-year-old Uzbek national in South Korea was arrested for funding Katibat al-Tawhid wal-Jihad through cryptocurrency (around 4,600 USD) as well as received funding (around 124,500 USD) to purchase 11 used cars which were sent to Syria using a used car business he owned.

On 10 June 2026, Kyrgyzstan’s State Committee for National Security claimed to have arrested 31 members belonging to Katibat al-Tawhid wal-Jihad as well as members of the Islamic State in the southern Osh and Batken regions, specifically in the Kyzyl-Kiya, Kara-Suu district, and Üch-Korgon areas in Kadamjay district from 8 June through 9th, seizing religious extremist literature, electronic storage devices with extremist materials, four unregistered firearms, symbols of terrorist groups, and money used to fund terrorist organizations abroad.
