= Ansar al-Din Front =

Syrian jihadist alliance founded in 2014

Supporters of the Religion Front
- جبهة أنصار الدين; Ansar al-Din
- The flag and the logo of Jabhat Ansar al-Din
- Leaders: Abu Abdullah al-Fajr; Abu Abdullah al-Shami
- Dates active: 25 July 2014 – 28 January 2017; 1 February 2018 – present? (splinter faction)
- Groups: (Member groups of Ansar al-Din Front - Harakat Fajr ash-Sham al-Islamiya): Liwa Suyuf al-Sham (greater Idlib area); Islamic Dawn Movement of the Levant; al-Murabitin Battalion; Osama Battalion; Abu Ali Yemeni Battalion; Abu Hilal Zitan Battalion; Abna Sharia; Ansar al-Haqq; Fursan al-Iman
- Active regions: Aleppo Governorate; Idlib Governorate; Homs Governorate; Hama Governorate; Latakia Governorate
- Ideology: Salafist jihadism
- Status: Unknown
- Size: 1,000
- Part of: Ansar al-Sharia; Tahrir al-Sham (2017-2018); Rouse the Believers Operations Room; So Be Steadfast Operations Room

Jabhat Ansar al-Din (Arabic: جبهة أنصار الدين, lit. 'Supporters of the Religion Front') is a jihadist alliance that announced itself on 25 July 2014, during the Syrian Civil War. The alliance contains two groups, Harakat Sham al-Islam and Harakat Fajr ash-Sham al-Islamiya, and declared itself unaffiliated with any other parties. The Green Battalion was originally a signatory, but around October 2014, it swore allegiance to the leader of Jaish al-Muhajireen wal-Ansar and was integrated into that faction. The alliance had attempted to maintain neutrality in the conflict between ISIL and other groups. On 28 January 2017, it joined with numerous other factions to form Tahrir al-Sham, though portions of it left HTS in February 2018.

== History ==
Harakat Sham al-Islam, Harakat Fajr ash-Sham al-Islamiya, Jaish al-Muhajireen wal-Ansar and Green Battalion announced the creation of Jabhat Ansar al-Din as an alliance between the four groups on 25 July 2014.

The groups involved in the coalition have diverse memberships; Harakat Fajr Sham al-Islamiya numbers mostly Syrians from the Aleppo area, while Harakat Sham al-Islam was formed around a core of Moroccan fighters, the Green Battalion mainly had fighters from Saudi Arabia and Jaish al-Mujahireen wal-Ansar was formed by Chechen and other Russian-speaking fighters.

The Green Battalion joined Jaish al-Muhajireen wal-Ansar in October 2014. The following September, Jaish al-Muhajireen wal-Ansar left the alliance and joined the Al-Nusra Front.

The two remaining factions in the alliance, Harakat Sham al-Islam led by Abu Mohammed al-Baydawi, and Harakat Fajr ash-Sham al-Islamiya, led by Abu Abdullah al-Shami, completely merged under Jabhat Ansar al-Din on 10 December 2016, which was headed by Abu Abdullah al-Shami. The next month, Jabhat Ansar al-Din dissolved itself and joined Hay'at Tahrir al-Sham. Harakat Fajr ash-Sham al-Islamiya defected from Tahrir al-Sham in February 2018 and resumed working as an independent group under the name Ansar al-Din Front - Harakat Fajr ash-Sham al-Islamiya.

== Activities ==
The organization participated in the Aleppo offensive that began in late October 2016.

The So Be Steadfast Operations Room fought against Hay'at Tahrir al-Sham (HTS) during the Idlib Governorate clashes in June 2020 after the arrests of Abu Salah al-Uzbeki, who headed the Ansar al-Din Front, and Abu al-Malik al-Talli, a dissident leader in HTS.

== Groups ==
=== Harakat Sham al-Islam ===
Flag of Harakat Sham al-Islam

Harakat Sham al-Islam (Arabic: حركة شام الإسلام, meaning "Islamic Movement of the Levant") is a jihadist group composed of primarily Moroccans that has been active during the Syrian Civil War. The group announced on 25 July 2014 that it became part of the Jabhat Ansar al-Din. It was designated as a terrorist organization by the US State Department on 24 September 2014, by the United Nations on 29 February 2016 and by Bahrain and Morocco.

The group was founded in August 2013 by Moroccans Brahim Benchekroun, (known by the pseudonym Ibrahim Bin Shakaran) Mohamed Mazouz, and Mohammed Souleimani Laalami, who had been released from the Guantanamo Bay detention camp. Harakat Sham al-Islam first came to notice because of the role it played in the 2013 Latakia offensive. The following year the group was one of the three primary factions, alongside Al-Nusra Front and Ansar al-Sham, that took part in the 2014 Latakia offensive. Harakat Sham al-Islam also has a presence in Aleppo, being involved in battles for Kindi Hospital and the Aleppo Central Prison.

The group's leader, Ibrahim Bin Shakaran, was killed in a battle with Syrian government forces in April 2014, along with the group's military commander, Abu Safiya Al-Masri. On 12 December 2016 they fully dissolved into Jabhat Ansar al-Din.

=== Harakat Fajr ash-Sham al-Islamiya ===
Harakat Fajr ash-Sham al-Islamiya (Arabic: حركة فجر الشام الإسلامية, Islamic Dawn Movement of the Levant) is a jihadist group that has been active during the Syrian Civil War. The group announced on 25 July 2014 that it became part of the Jabhat Ansar al-Din. On 12 December 2016, the group fully dissolved into Jabhat Ansar al-Din.

On 1 February 2018, Harakat Fajr ash-Sham al-Islamiya left Tahrir al-Sham and began operating under the name Ansar al-Din Front - Harakat Fajr ash-Sham al-Islamiya.

On 20 June 2018, al-Murabitin Battalion, Osama Battalion, Abu Ali Yemeni Battalion and Abu Hilal Zitan Battalion left Tahrir al-Sham to join the Islamic Dawn Movement of the Levant.

On 2 August 2018, Ansar al-Haqq and Abna Sharia joined.

On 20 August 2018, Fursan al-Iman joined the group.

== Relationship with other groups ==
The group has stated they desire to maintain a policy of neutrality and independence between various groups in fighting against the Syrian government as well as stating a desire to cooperate with these groups as well, prior the formation of the group the member groups did cooperate with ISIL in early 2014 in besieging the Kweiris airbase.

In an interview in 2015 a representative from the group was asked about their views regarding both al-Nusra and ISIL to which the representative said regarding al-Nusra "The problem is with them, not with us: we are prepared to work with all upright factions whose goals are like ours. It is not hidden from anyone that the goals of the majority of factions are like our goals." He added when asked if al-Nusra has made mistakes on the ground "In my personal opinion indeed we all make mistakes…and perhaps in Jabhat al-Nusra’s point of view it is not necessary to establish a Caliphate while the gangs of Assad exist in Syria." When asked about the group's stance on ISIL he said "We have no relation with IS (Islamic State). We don’t fight them and they don’t fight us. But anyone who says that Jabhat Ansar al-Din is affiliated with IS is lying."

Abu Salah al-Uzbeki and 50 other fighters defected from Hay'at Tahrir al-Sham (HTS) and joined the group in 2020.

== See also ==
- List of armed groups in the Syrian Civil War
