= Jihad Coordination =

Militant group

- Arabic: تنسيق الجهاد; Tansiqiyat al-Jihad
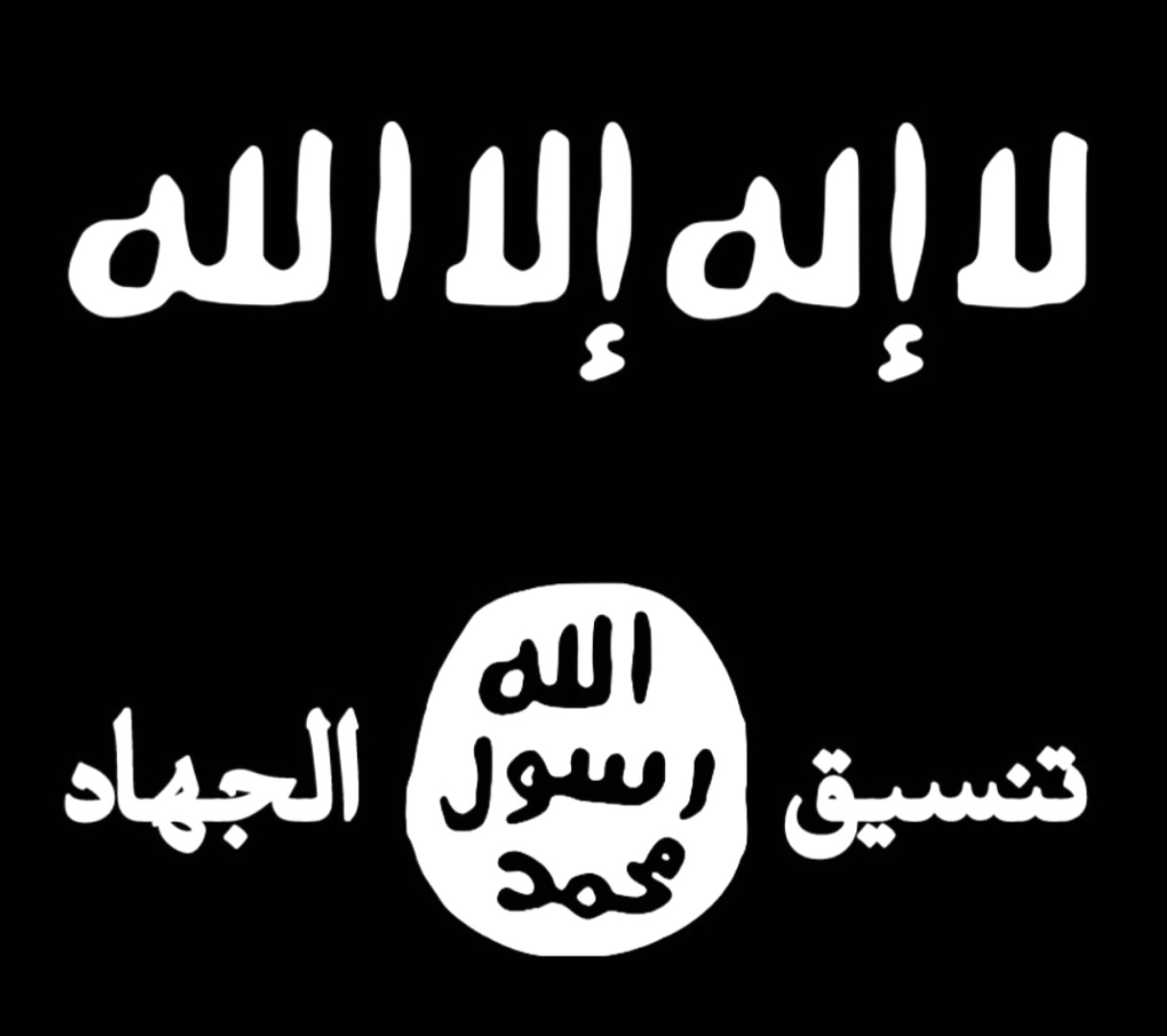
- Leader: Abu al-Abd Ashidaa
- Dates active: March 2020–June 2023
- Headquarters: Western Aleppo
- Active regions: Idlib Governorate, Syria; Latakia Governorate, Syria
- Ideology: Salafi jihadism
- Part of: So Be Steadfast Operations Room
- Wars: Syrian civil war

Jihad Coordination (Arabic: تنسيق الجهاد, romanized: Tansiqiyat al-Jihad) (also commonly translated as al-Jihad Coordination) was a Salafist jihadist militant group in Idlib Governorate, Syria during the Syrian civil war. The group has been led by Abu al-Abd Ashidaa since it formed.
