= Tramla =

Tramla ترملا
- Village
- Location in Syria
- Coordinates: 35°31′29″N 36°28′58″E
- Country: Syria
- Governorate: Idlib
- District: Maarrat al-Nu'man District
- Subdistrict: Kafr Nabl Nahiyah

Population (2004)
  - Total: 1,556
- Time zone: UTC+2 (EET)
  - Summer (DST): UTC+3 (EEST)
- City Qrya Pcode: C4051

Tramla (Arabic: ترملا) is a Syrian village located in Kafr Nabl Nahiyah in Maarrat al-Nu'man District, Idlib. According to the Syria Central Bureau of Statistics (CBS), Tramla had a population of 1,556 in the 2004 census.

== Syrian Civil War ==
On 2 February 2016, the village was shelled by the Syrian Army.
