= Ahmed al-Sharaa =

President of Syria since 2025

His Excellency Ahmed al-Sharaa
- أحمد الشرع
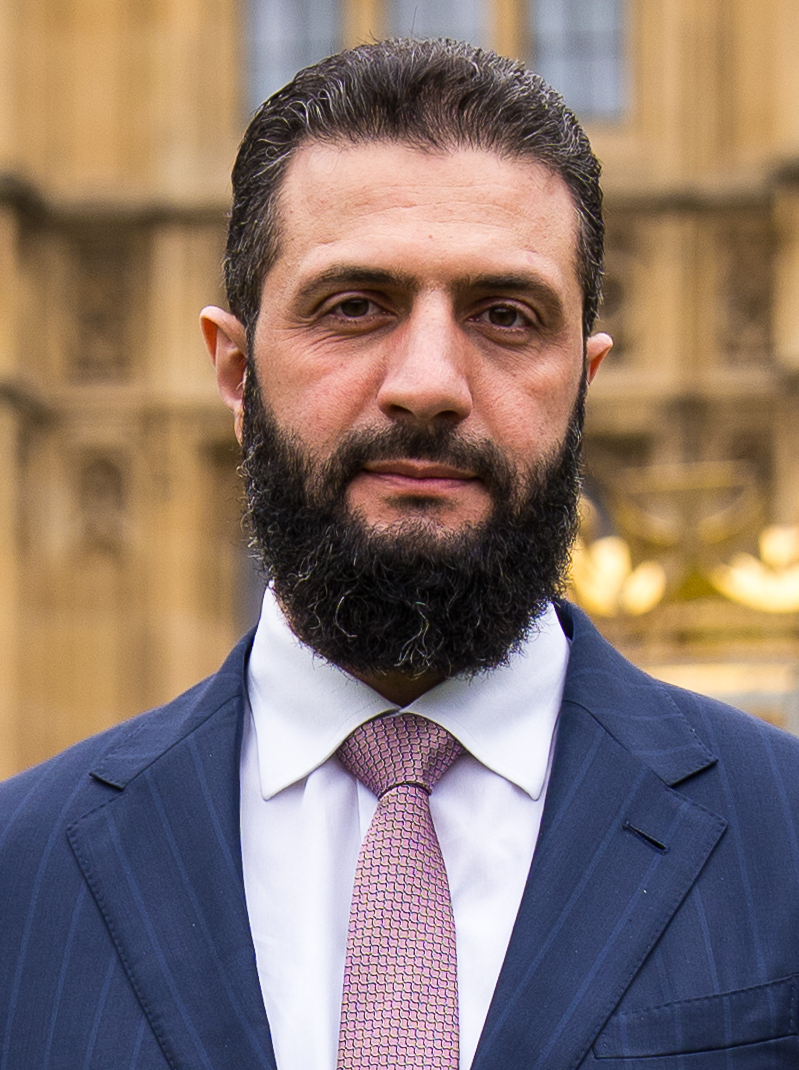
- Al-Sharaa in 2026

President of Syria
- Incumbent
- Assumed office 29 January 2025
- Prime Minister: Mohammed al-Bashir (2024–2025) (Note: From 10 December 2024 to 29 March 2025, Mohammed al-Bashir served as the Prime Minister of Syria under the Syrian caretaker government until al-Sharaa announced the formation of the Syrian transitional government, after which the position of Prime Minister was abolished.)
- Vice President: Vacant
- Preceded by: Himself (as de facto leader)

Leader of Syria (Note: Following the fall of the Assad regime, al-Sharaa served as Syria's de facto leader as the emir of the Hay'at Tahrir al-Sham, general commander and head of the new Syrian administration until 29 January 2025, when he was appointed President of Syria by the Syrian General Command.)
- De facto 8 December 2024 – 29 January 2025
- Prime Minister: Mohammed al-Bashir
- Preceded by: Bashar al-Assad (as President)
- Succeeded by: Himself (as President)

Leader of the Syrian Salvation Government (Note: As the emir of Hay'at Tahrir al-Sham (HTS), al-Sharaa was widely regarded as the de facto leader of the Syrian Salvation Government after HTS established control over most of Idlib Governorate, which was governed through its civilian administration.)
- De facto 2 November 2017 – 10 December 2024
- Prime Minister: See list: Mohammed al-Sheikh; Fawaz Hilal; Ali Keda; Mohammed al-Bashir
- Preceded by: Office established
- Succeeded by: Office abolished

Emir of Hay'at Tahrir al-Sham (Note: called Commander of Military Operations from 8 December 2024 until 29 January 2025.)
- In office 1 October 2017 – 29 January 2025
- Preceded by: Abu Jaber Sheikh
- Succeeded by: Office abolished

Emir of Al-Nusra Front (Note: Renamed "Jabhat Fatah al-Sham" from 28 July 2016)
- In office 23 January 2012 – 28 January 2017
- Preceded by: Office established
- Succeeded by: Office abolished

Personal details
- Born: Ahmed Hussein al-Sharaa; 29 October 1982 (age 44) Riyadh, Saudi Arabia
- Party: Independent (since 2025)
- Other political affiliations: Hay'at Tahrir al-Sham (2017–2025)
- Spouse: Latifa al-Droubi (m. 2012)
- Children: 3
- Parents: Hussein al-Sharaa (father); Widad al-Khaled (mother)
- Relatives: Sharaa family
- Education: Damascus University (dropped out)
- Nickname: Abu Mohammad al-Julani

Military service
- Allegiance: Formerly: Al-Qaeda (2003–2016); Al-Qaeda in Iraq (2003‍–‍2011); Al-Nusra Front (2012‍–‍2016); Jabhat Fatah al-Sham (2016‍–‍2017); Hay'at Tahrir al-Sham (2017‍–‍2025); Syrian Salvation Government (2017‍–‍2024)
- Years of service: 2003–2024 (Note: As president, he remains active as the Commander-in-chief of the Syrian Armed Forces.)
- Battles/wars: See list: Iraq War; Iraqi insurgency (2003–2006) (POW); Syrian civil war; Deir ez-Zor clashes (2011-14); Idlib insurgency; Battle of Damascus (2012); Damascus offensive (2013); Rif Dimashq offensive (March-August 2013); Rif Dimashq offensive (September-November 2013); Rif Dimashq offensive (August-November 2014); 2014 Hama offensive; Hama offensive (March-April 2017); Hama offensive (September 2017); 2017-18 Northwestern Syria campaign; Dawn of Idlib; Dawn of Idlib 2; 2022-24 Northwestern Syria clashes; Opposition-ISIL conflict; Battle of Markada; Deir ez-Zor offensive (April-July 2014); Inter-rebel conflict; al-Nusra Front-SRF conflict (2014); Battle of Maarat al-Numan (2016); January-March 2017 Idlib clashes; July 2017 Idlib clashes; 2018 Aleppo clashes; 2019 Aleppo clashes; 2020 Idlib clashes; 2021 Idlib clashes; 2024 Syrian opposition offensives; Northwestern Syria offensive; Battle of Aleppo; Hama offensive; Homs offensive; Fall of Damascus

Ahmed Hussein al-Sharaa (Note: Arabic: أحمَد حُسين الشرع, romanized: ʾAḥmad Ḥusayn ash-Sharaʿ, pronounced [ˈʔaħmad ħuˈsajn aʃˈʃaraʕ]. Also transliterated as Ahmad al-Sharaa and Ahmed al-Shara'.) (born 29 October 1982), also known by his former nom de guerre (Note: The term nom de guerre is used by multiple reliable sources: Abouzeid, Rania (25 December 2012). "Interview with Official of Jabhat al-Nusra, Syria's Islamist Militia Group". Time. Archived from the original on 27 December 2012. "Jabhat al-Nusra is headed by a man who uses the nom de guerre of Abu Mohammad al-Golani"; Szybala, Valerie (1 August 2013). "Al-Qaeda Shows Its True Colors in Syria". Institute for the Study of War. Archived from the original on 6 August 2013. "Among them was JN's leader, who goes by the nom de guerre of Abu Mohammad al-Julani."; Abdul-Zahra, Qassim; Karam, Zeina (4 November 2013). "Elusive Al-Qaeda leader in Syria stays in shadows". The Times of Israel. Archived from the original on 7 November 2013. "Al-Golani is a nom de guerre"; Al-Lami, Mina (9 December 2024). "From Syrian jihadist leader to rebel politician: How Abu Mohammed al-Jolani reinvented himself". BBC News. Archived from the original on 9 December 2024. "Syrian rebel leader Abu Mohammed al-Jolani has dropped that nom de guerre associated with his jihadist past"; Nasr, Wassim (17 December 2024). "Exclusive: Syria's de facto new leader Ahmed al-Sharaa calls for lifting of sanctions". France 24. Archived from the original on 17 December 2024. "His nom de guerre, Abu Mohammed al-Jolani, has been shed"; Gambrell, Jon (2 February 2025). "Syria's interim president visits Saudi Arabia on first trip abroad, likely a signal to Iran". AP News. Archived from the original on 2 February 2025. "first known internationally by the nom de guerre Abu Mohammed al-Golani"; Zeidan, Adam (2 February 2025). "Ahmed al-Sharaa". Encyclopædia Britannica. Archived from the original on 3 February 2025. "Before replacing Assad as the de facto leader of Syria, Sharaa went by the nom de guerre Abu Mohammad al-Jolani.") Abu Mohammad al-Julani, (Note: Arabic: أبو محمد الجولاني, romanized: ʾAbū Muḥammad al-Jawlānī, pronounced [ˈʔabuː muˈħammad al.dʒawˈlaːniː]. Also transliterated as Jolani, Joulani, Jawlani, and Golani.) is a Syrian statesman and former rebel commander who has served as the president of Syria since 2025. As the emir of Hay'at Tahrir al-Sham (HTS) and the de facto leader of the Syrian Salvation Government (SSG) during the Syrian civil war, he led the decisive Syrian opposition offensives that resulted in the fall of the Assad regime in 2024.

Born in Riyadh, Saudi Arabia, to a Syrian Sunni Muslim family from the Golan Heights, he grew up in Syria's capital, Damascus. Al-Sharaa joined al-Qaeda in Iraq shortly before the 2003 U.S. invasion of Iraq and fought for two years in the Iraqi insurgency. From 2005 to 2011, he was captured and imprisoned by American and Iraqi forces. His release coincided with the onset of the Syrian revolution against the Ba'athist regime of Bashar al-Assad. In 2012, with the support of al-Qaeda's central command, al-Sharaa founded Jabhat al-Nusra, also known as al-Nusra Front, to depose the Assad regime.

As the emir of al-Nusra Front, al-Sharaa built a stronghold in Idlib Governorate during the Syrian civil war, although his forces committed a number of war crimes against civilians. Al-Sharaa resisted Abu Bakr al-Baghdadi's attempts to merge al-Nusra Front with the Islamic State, leading to total war between the two groups. In 2016, al-Sharaa cut Jabhat al-Nusra's ties with al-Qaeda, launched a crackdown on its loyalists, and rebranded his organisation as Jabhat Fatah al-Sham. After breaking with al-Qaeda, he sought international legitimacy by presenting a more moderate view of himself, renouncing transnational jihadism and focusing on governance in Syria.

In 2017, al-Sharaa merged Jabhat Fatah al-Sham with other rebel groups to create Hay'at Tahrir al-Sham, which he led until 2025. HTS established the Syrian Salvation Government, a technocratic civilian administration, in the territory it controlled in Idlib Governorate. The SSG collected taxes and provided public services, though it faced protests and criticism within Idlib for authoritarian tactics and suppressing dissent. In November 2024, al-Sharaa launched a major 11-day offensive against the Assad regime that culminated in the capture of Damascus by opposition forces, toppling the Ba'athist regime as Bashar al-Assad fled to Russia.

Al-Sharaa became Syria's de facto head of state, leading the Syrian caretaker government from 8 December 2024 until 29 January 2025, when he was formally appointed to the Syrian presidency. As president of Syria's transitional government, he focused on consolidating power, rebuilding state institutions, unifying armed factions, and restoring foreign relations, including with the United States, Russia, and other regional powers. He signed a constitutional declaration establishing a five-year transitional period that enshrined Islamic jurisprudence as the main source of legislation with plans to hold elections afterwards. In October 2025, a parliamentary election was held under al-Sharaa's administration, the first since Assad's overthrow.

Domestically, al-Sharaa has pursued economic recovery, security stabilisation, transitional justice, and the return of Syrian refugees. Extensive negotiations with the Kurdish-led Syrian Democratic Forces (SDF) to integrate their organisation into the state remained inconclusive throughout 2025. In January 2026, after clashes in Aleppo between the transitional government and SDF forces, he signed a decree stating that Syrian Kurds are an essential part of Syria while recognising the Kurdish language and Newroz. His government launched a successful offensive against the SDF and subsequently signed a peace and integration agreement, culminating in the full integration of its civil institutions and the dissolution of the SDF in August 2026.

In the first year of al-Sharaa's presidency, massacres targeting Alawites took place in coastal Syria, while clashes with the Druze occurred in southern Syria, both involving government-affiliated troops. Following the fall of the Ba'athist regime, Israel called the 1974 Agreement on Disengagement void, and initiated a limited invasion of southwestern Syria from the Israeli-occupied Golan Heights. Al-Sharaa has opposed renewed conflict with Israel, reaffirmed Syria's commitment to the 1974 deal, and condemned Iranian influence.

== Early life and military career ==
=== Youth in Syria ===
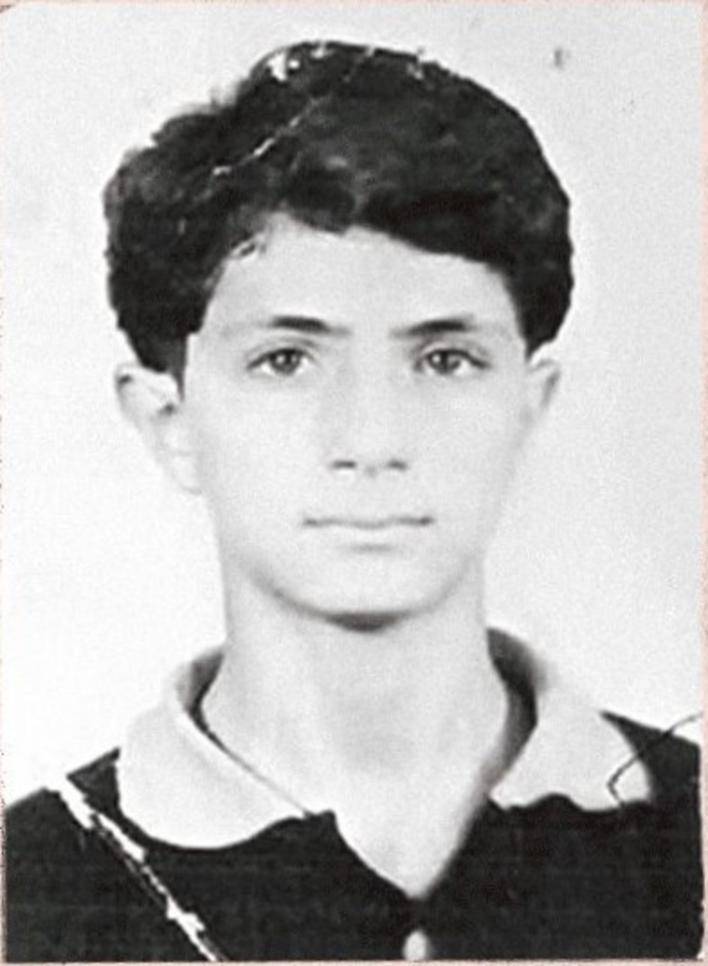
Al-Sharaa as a teenager, c. 1996

Ahmed Hussein al-Sharaa was born on 29 October 1982 in Riyadh to a middle-class Syrian Sunni Muslim family of four brothers and two sisters. The family claims to trace their lineage back to the Sahabi Abd al-Rahman ibn Awf from the Banu Zuhrah clan of the Quraysh tribe, whose grandson migrated to the region of al-Kafarat in Jordan as part of the early Islamic expansion. Like many other Qurayshi families across the Arab world, they had historically been involved in scholarly pursuits. According to The New York Times, the family discussed politics at home but had no record of involvement in Islamic extremism.

His father, Hussein al-Sharaa, worked as an oil engineer at the Ministry of Oil and Mineral Resources, while his mother, Widad al-Khaled, was a geography teacher. The family returned to Syria in 1989, settling in the affluent Mezzeh neighborhood of Damascus, where his father opened a real estate office. Whilst living in an apartment block in the Mezzeh neighbourhood in the west of the city, al-Sharaa worked part-time as a child in a grocery store owned by his father. He frequented the Shafi'i mosque in his neighbourhood, and at the age of seventeen, he became religious, habitually wearing a long austere tunic and a knitted cap.

According to Syrian researcher Hussam Jazmati, al-Sharaa's classmates remembered him as a studious but unremarkable boy who wore thick glasses and avoided attention. During his youth, he was described as "bookish", "quiet" and "shy", "manipulatively intelligent" but "socially introverted", and was noted for his "good looks" and a romance with an Alawite girl which both families opposed.

Al-Sharaa stated that, while he largely disagreed with his father ideologically, they both shared a commitment to defending the Palestinians. Besides the displacement of his grandfather and his family from the Golan Heights, al-Sharaa stated he was radicalised by the Second Intifada in 2000. He said: "I was 17 or 18 years old at the time and I started thinking about how I could fulfil my duties, defending a people who are oppressed by occupiers and invaders." When asked about his reaction to the September 11 attacks, al-Sharaa stated that "Anyone who lived in the Islamic or Arab world at the time who tells you he wasn't happy about it would be lying. But people regret the killing of innocent people, for sure."

Al-Sharaa enrolled at Damascus University, studying media studies and enrolling in the Faculty of Medicine for two years. Whilst being a university student, he travelled from Damascus to Aleppo on Fridays to attend the sermons of Mahmoud Gul Aghasi (Abu al-Qaqaa) there. After studying for two years, he moved to Iraq in 2003 without notifying his family.

=== Iraq war ===
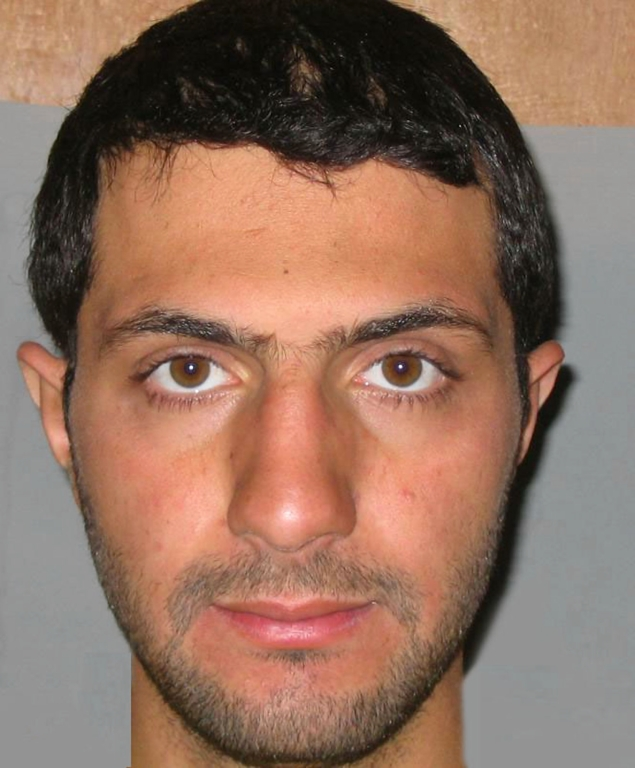
Mug shot of al-Sharaa, age 23, after his capture by U.S. forces in Iraq in 2005

In 2003, al-Sharaa travelled from Damascus to Baghdad by bus just weeks before the U.S. invasion of Iraq. He was subsequently detained and questioned by the Military Intelligence Directorate in Syria for his illegal departure to Iraq, but was released after denying affiliation with any political parties or extremist groups. Following his arrival he quickly rose through the ranks of al-Qaeda in Iraq (AQI). In 2004, Iraqi intelligence believed al-Sharaa was Zarqawi's deputy, according to The Economist. The Times of Israel claimed in 2013 that al-Sharaa was a close associate of AQI emir, Abu Musab al-Zarqawi. He later denied ever meeting al-Zarqawi and stated that he served only as a regular foot-soldier against the American occupation.

In 2005, al-Sharaa was arrested by American forces while planting explosives and imprisoned for six years in various detention centres, including Abu Ghraib, Camp Bucca, Camp Cropper and Camp Taji prisons. Al-Sharaa convinced the Iraqi authorities holding him that he was a local Iraqi, not a foreign fighter, by speaking in Iraqi-accented Arabic and using a pseudonym, Amjad Mudhafar. During this time, al-Sharaa reportedly taught classical Arabic to other prisoners, increasing his popularity.

== Syrian civil war ==
=== Syrian uprising and foundation of al-Nusra Front ===
During a routine detention review, Iraqi authorities, finding no charges against al-Sharaa's pseudonym, Amjad Mudhafar, released him on 13 March 2011, days before the beginning of the Syrian revolution. In August 2011, al-Sharaa was tasked by al-Qaeda emir Ayman al-Zawahiri to establish al-Qaeda's mission in Syria. Alongside senior al-Qaeda operatives, he formed Jabhat an-Nuṣrah li-Ahl ash-Shām (lit. 'Front of the Supporters of the People of the Levant') which was envisioned as a broad coalition of Islamist militant groups in Syria, led by al-Sharaa with direct allegiance to al-Qaeda's central command. During this time, al-Sharaa went under the nom de guerre Abu Mohammad al-Julani. According to his PBS Frontline interview, his nisba "al-Julani" referred to his family's origins in the Golan Heights.

Despite later tensions with the leadership of the Islamic State of Iraq (ISI), al-Sharaa proceeded to orchestrate an agreement with its emir Abu Bakr al-Baghdadi, who gave him $50,000 (approximately 60 million dinar) to expand Jabhat al-Nusra as al-Qaeda's Syrian branch. ISI provided al-Sharaa with fighters, weapons and funding, and maintained an alliance with Jabhat al-Nusra until 2013, with disputes referred to mediation by al-Qaeda emir Ayman al-Zawahiri. Sources differ on whether al-Sharaa was the one who came up with the idea of forming Jabhat al-Nusra or another leader in ISI; however, what is certain is that al-Sharaa became the "general emir" of Jabhat al-Nusra when it was officially announced in January 2012.

By December of that year, the US Department of State designated Jabhat al-Nusra as a terrorist organisation, identifying it as an alias for al-Qaeda in Iraq. The US State Department listed al-Sharaa as a Specially Designated Global Terrorist in May 2013. Under al-Sharaa's authority, Jabhat al-Nusra emerged as one of Syria's most powerful rebel groups. Its stronghold was centered on the Idlib Governorate in northwestern Syria, where they attacked both Ba'athist Syrian government forces and US-supported Syrian opposition groups.

=== War crimes of al-Nusra Front ===
Under al-Sharaa's leadership, al-Nusra Front committed a series of war crimes against Syria's Alawite, Shia, and Druze communities. In 2015, al-Nusra Front fighters killed 20 Druze villagers during the Qalb Loze massacre. According to Al-Arabiya, the central command of al-Nusra Front denounced the attack, asserting that the actions of the attackers were in contradiction to the organization's policy.

In June 2013, al-Nusra Front fighters took part in the Hatla massacre, during which 30 to 60 Shia civilians were killed in the Deir ez-Zor Governorate. On 12 May 2016, rebel militants led by al-Nusra Front killed 42 civilians while kidnapping up to 70 people after taking control of the Alawite village of Zara'a in Southern Hama. Al-Nusra Front was also behind suicide bombings in Lebanon directed against Alawite and Shia populations, including the 2015 Tripoli bombings.

=== Conflict with ISIS ===
He is a cunning person; two-faced; adores himself; does not care about the religion of his soldiers; is willing to sacrifice their blood in order to make a name for himself in the media; glows when he hears his name mentioned on satellite channels.

— Abu Ali al-Anbari, describing al-Sharaa per New Lines Magazine

As al-Sharaa carved out a fiefdom in northwestern Syria between 2012 and 2013, the Iraqi leadership of ISI grew suspicious of him. Al-Nusra Front became increasingly popular for providing social services and cooperating with other Syrian rebel groups against the Assad regime, and al-Sharaa ignored al-Baghdadi's orders to begin fighting these groups and assassinate opposition activists. Over time, al-Sharaa began distancing himself from transnational jihadism, increasingly framing his faction within the context of a nationalist Syrian struggle. Al-Baghdadi's top aide, Abu Ali al-Anbari, travelled to Syria to investigate al-Sharaa, concluding that he was a "cunning person; two-faced; [...] [who] glows when he hears his name mentioned on satellite channels".

Concerned about al-Sharaa's perceived insubordination and Jabhat al-Nusra's popularity, Abu Bakr al-Baghdadi unilaterally announced that it would merge into ISI to form the Islamic State of Iraq and Syria (ISIS) in April 2013. The proposed merger would have eliminated Jabhat al-Nusra's autonomy and allegiance to al-Qaeda's central command by placing all its leaders, decisions, and operations under al-Baghdadi's direct control. To preserve his independence, al-Sharaa publicly pledged allegiance directly to al-Qaeda emir, Ayman al-Zawahiri, who issued a declaration that confirmed the independence of Jabhat al-Nusra from ISI, proclaiming that Syria was the "spatial state" of Jabhat al-Nusra and that ISI's rule was restricted to Iraq.

Al-Zawahiri repudiated al-Baghdadi's merger, which was announced without consulting or informing al-Qaeda's central command, and appointed Abu Khalid al-Suri as his emissary to mediate between the two groups and supervise the implementation of the accords. In late 2013, al-Zawahiri ordered al-Baghdadi to accept the annulment of the merger, who refused and attempted to proceed with it. By February 2014, efforts to end the dispute between ISIS and Jabhat al-Nusra had failed, leading to al-Qaeda formally severing its ties with ISIS in February 2014; leaving Jabhat al-Nusra as the sole representative of al-Qaeda in Syria.

After the assassination of Abu Khalid al-Suri on 23 February 2014, al-Sharaa denounced ISIS and likened them to the Iraqi "sahawat" who fought against al-Qaeda alongside American forces, accusing them of undermining the fight against Assad. Open warfare between ISIS and al-Nusra Front ensued, and over the following months, ISIS captured much of the territory controlled by al-Nusra Front and the Syrian opposition, leaving an estimated four thousand fighters on both sides dead by February 2015. In June 2015, al-Sharaa told Al-Jazeera that no resolution to the conflict was forthcoming, and that unless ISIS "repent to God and return to their senses", there would be "nothing but fighting between us".

In July 2014, an audio recording of a major rally of fighters in Syria was leaked, including al-Sharaa, Jabhat al-Nusra's spokesman Abu Firas al-Suri, and its deputy emir Ahmad Salama Mabruk. In it, al-Suri could be heard introducing al-Sharaa as "Abu Mohammad al-Julani", the emir of al-Nusra Front, who then spoke of establishing an Islamic emirate in Syria. In a video released by al-Nusra Front on 8 August 2014, al-Suri said that an emirate in Syria would only be declared after consulting with other factions.

International and domestic threats

After the start of Operation Inherent Resolve, the U.S.-led coalition's airstrike campaign against the Islamic State, al-Sharaa, in a rare public declaration, described the airstrikes as an assault on Islam, and warned the Western public: "This is what will take the battle to the heart of your land, for the Muslims will not stand as spectators watching their sons bombed and killed in their lands, while you stay safe in your lands." Al-Sharaa also warned that al-Nusra Front would fight any group which takes American cash and weapons, condemning "traitorous factions that were bought by the West with some money and ammunition so as to be a pawn in its hands." In an audio statement released on 28 September 2014, al-Sharaa stated that al-Nusra Front would fight the "United States and its allies" and urged his fighters not to accept help from the West in their battle against the Islamic State.

By October 2015, the Russian intervention in the Syrian civil war prompted al-Sharaa to call for increased attacks on Assad strongholds in Alawite villages in retaliation for Russian airstrikes on Sunni areas, saying, "There is no choice but to escalate the battle and target Alawite towns and villages in Latakia." He also called on Muslims from the former Soviet Union to attack Russian civilians if Russia continued attacking Syrian civilians.

Also in 2015, al-Sharaa described the Geneva peace conference as a farce and claimed that the Syrian National Coalition did not represent the Syrian people and had no ground presence in Syria. Al-Sharaa mentioned that Jabhat al-Nusra had no plans for attacking Western targets and was focused on fighting the Ba'athist Syrian government, Hezbollah, and the Islamic State. When asked about plans for post-war Syria, al-Sharaa initially stated that all factions in the country will be consulted before anyone thinks about "establishing an Islamic state," referring to al-Baghdadi. He also stated that Jabhat al-Nusra would not target the country's Alawite minority despite its support for the Assad regime. He continued: "Our war is not a matter of revenge against the Alawites despite the fact that in Islam, they are considered to be heretics", he added. A commentary on this interview, however, states that al-Sharaa also added that Alawites would be left alone as long as they abandon elements of their faith which contradict Islam.

=== Split from al-Qaeda ===
The Russian entrance into the war led to military setbacks for the Syrian opposition, causing their foreign backers to exert a greater level of influence over them. In January 2016, al-Nusra Front held unity negotiations with other rebel groups in a bid to pre-empt any foreign attempt to co-opt these groups against it. When the talks collapsed due to concerns over Jabhat al-Nusra's affiliation with al-Qaeda, the reformist wing of al-Nusra Front, which may have comprised a third of its overall membership, presented al-Sharaa with an ultimatum: to sever ties with al-Qaeda and merge with other rebel groups, or face a mass defection.

In July 2016, al-Sharaa convened Jabhat al-Nusra's Shura Council twice to discuss the matter. The first council was inconclusive, while the second council settled on a "middle way" after several meetings: to break ties with al-Qaeda outside of Syria while retaining them inside Syria. As al-Zawahiri could not be contacted, several senior al-Qaeda leaders, including al-Zawahiri's deputy Abu Khayr al-Masri, approved the split contingent on al-Zawahiri later approving it himself. If he did not, the split would have to be reversed. Al-Sharaa agreed to these terms, which Jabhat al-Nusra's Shura Council narrowly approved.

On 28 July 2016, al-Sharaa announced that al-Nusra Front had severed ties with al-Qaeda and rebranded as Jabhat Fatah al-Sham (JFS). He added that the new organisation would have "no affiliation to any external entity". Ayman al-Zawahiri was publicly supportive of the split, even though he had rejected the plan when it was presented to him. In protest, several leading al-Qaeda loyalists in al-Nusra Front left JFS.

=== Formation of Hay'at Tahrir al-Sham (HTS) ===
After forming JFS, al-Sharaa attempted to arrange a merger with Ahrar al-Sham. However, negotiations collapsed due to al-Sharaa supporting Jund al-Aqsa, a group that he had secretly established to discourage Jabhat al-Nusra's foreign fighters from defecting to ISIS, in their conflict with Ahrar al-Sham. Ahrar al-Sham's leadership was also concerned that JFS continued to maintain ties with al-Qaeda. Meanwhile, al-Sharaa came under attack from al-Qaeda. Abu Muhammad al-Maqdisi wrote a critique of JFS, and rumours circulated that al-Qaeda was preparing to launch a new affiliate in Syria.

In a last-ditch attempt to secure a merger, al-Sharaa led efforts to undermine Ahrar al-Sham's nationalist and anti-merger wing. When Ahrar al-Sham's leadership again refused to merge in December 2017, the Islamist and pro-merger wing formed a breakaway "sub-faction" named Jaysh al-Ahrar. Shortly afterwards, JFS attacked Free Syrian Army (FSA) positions across Idlib and Aleppo, precipitating a conflict with Ahrar al-Sham. The conflict allowed JFS to defeat CIA-backed FSA groups, which it viewed as a "foreign conspiracy".

On 28 January 2017, al-Sharaa announced that JFS would dissolve and merge with Liwa al-Haqq, Jaysh al-Sunna, Ansar al-Din Front and the Nour al-Din al-Zenki Movement to form Hay'at Tahrir al-Sham (HTS), gaining approximately 3,000 to 5,000 more fighters. In an effort to demonstrate the maturity of the new group, al-Sharaa arranged for Jaysh al-Ahrar's leader Abu Jaber Sheikh to serve as the nominal emir of HTS, although authority was formally transferred back to al-Sharaa by December 2017. The remaining al-Qaeda loyalists in JFS viewed the formation of HTS as a definitive break from the organisation and refused to join. A number of al-Qaeda veterans publicly criticised al-Sharaa for his moves. As a result, several were arrested by HTS towards the end of 2017. After their release, some were involved in forming Hurras al-Din, the new Syrian affiliate of al-Qaeda.

The U.S. government quickly rejected this rebranding, with the U.S. Embassy in Syria stating that "The core of HTS is Nusra, a designated terrorist organisation. This designation applies regardless of what name it uses or what groups merge into it." The Embassy characterised HTS's formation as an attempt to "hijack the Syrian revolution" rather than a move toward moderation. On 10 May 2017, the Rewards for Justice program announced a $10 million reward for information leading to the identification or location of al-Sharaa, who was identified by the program as the leader of Jabhat al-Nusra.

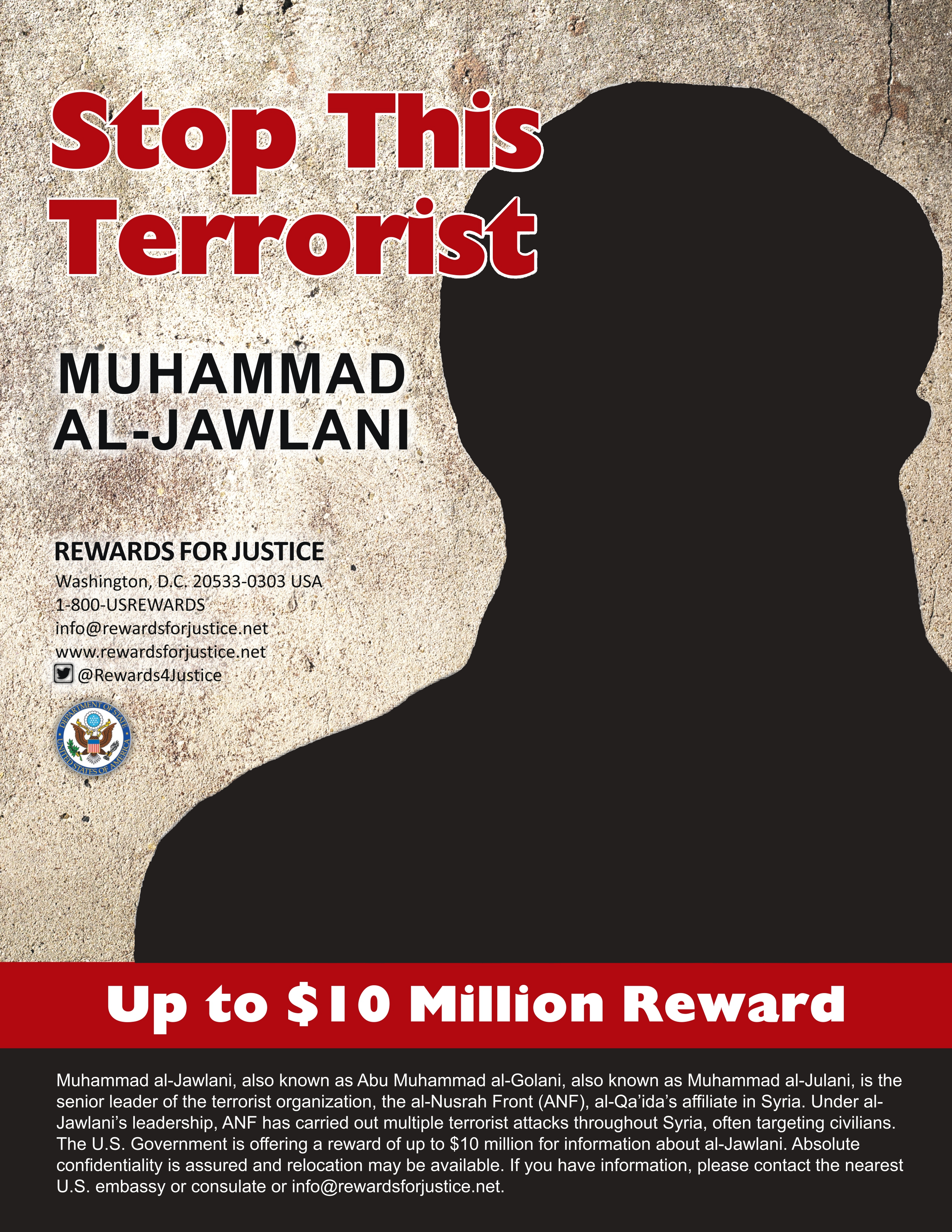
Redacted Rewards for Justice poster for al-Sharaa, with the photographic portrait removed due to copyright concerns.

Under al-Sharaa's leadership, Hay'at Tahrir al-Sham prioritised combating al-Qaeda and ISIS in an effort to improve its standing with Western nations. HTS successfully defeated ISIS, al-Qaeda, and most opposing forces in its territory, establishing control over most of Idlib Governorate, which it governed through its civilian administration, the Syrian Salvation Government (SSG).

=== Idlib governance ===
Military situation before the opposition offensives in late 2024. Territories held by Hay'at Tahrir al-Sham (white) and the Syrian government (red).

Under al-Sharaa's technocratic administration, Idlib experienced significant economic development, becoming Syria's fastest-growing region despite being historically its poorest province. The area featured new luxury shopping malls, housing estates, and a round-the-clock electricity supply surpassing that of the capital, Damascus. Educational facilities included a university with 18,000 segregated students. However, his government faced criticism for its taxation policies, including customs taxes on goods from Turkey and checkpoint fees on smuggled goods, as well as the economic impact of the Turkish lira's depreciation, which was the main currency in the region.

In August 2018, al-Sharaa said that both HTS's allies and opponents viewed the group as "the greatest defender of Sunnis in Syria." He cautioned that Turkish positions were uncertain, as political stances could change anytime. He also defended the evacuation of the Shia-majority villages of Foua and Kafraya, saying it removed the threat of "sectarian militias" and prevented Iran from having a pretext to attack.

In February 2023, Idlib Governorate, which was under the control of the Syrian Salvation Government, was one of the territories hardest hit by the Turkey–Syria earthquakes. The Assad regime's policy of besieging northwestern Syria and blockading the supply of food, medicines and other humanitarian supplies further worsened the crisis in Idlib. Al-Sharaa criticised aid agencies for neglecting Idlib and urged the international community to step up reconstruction and relief efforts, saying, "The United Nations needs to understand that it is required to help in a crisis." When asked about efforts to rebrand HTS, al-Sharaa said, "We have built a government that meets our people's needs, but much more is still required."

In March 2024, widespread protests erupted in Idlib Governorate against al-Sharaa's rule, with demonstrators adopting the slogan "Isqat al-Julani" ("Down with Julani"), reminiscent of earlier protests against the Assad regime. Hundreds of protesters marched through Idlib's cities and towns for over a month. The protests were triggered by multiple factors, including allegations of brutality by HTS, with reports of thousands of critics held in prisons, and economic grievances related to high taxes. In response, al-Sharaa made several concessions. He released hundreds of detainees from a previous summer's security operation, including his former deputy Abu Maria al-Qahtani, who had been arrested along with 300 others in a purge. He also promised local elections and increased employment opportunities for displaced persons, while warning protesters against what he termed as treachery.

Turkey, which had previously helped stabilize the province by connecting it to its electricity grid and allowing building materials to enter freely, had grown concerned about al-Sharaa's expanding influence. In response, it reduced trade through its border crossings with Idlib, affecting HTS's revenue. Reports indicated that al-Sharaa had twice attempted to take over territory from the Turkish-administered regions in northern Syria.

=== Fall of the Assad regime ===
Planning by Syrian opposition forces for a military offensive against Aleppo began in late 2023 but was delayed by Turkish objections. Turkish president Recep Tayyip Erdoğan sought negotiations with the Assad regime, to "determine Syria's future together," but received a negative response, following which he allowed the HTS-led opposition troops to begin their offensive against the Assad regime.

Al-Sharaa led the Syrian opposition offensives that overthrew the Assad regime in eleven days

On 27 November 2024, HTS announced that it had launched a large-scale offensive against Ba'athist Syrian government forces in northwestern Syria, that subsequently evolved into a nationwide military campaign. During the Battle of Aleppo, al-Sharaa instructed his forces not to "scare children" and on 29 November, HTS entered Aleppo and captured most of the city. HTS channels broadcast footage of Christians in the city continuing their everyday activities, while Archbishop Afram Ma'lui stated that services would not be affected by the change in control. After government forces were expelled from the city, al-Sharaa declared that "diversity is a strength".

The next day, HTS made rapid advances, capturing dozens of towns and villages as pro-government forces disintegrated, and advanced toward Hama in central Syria, subsequently capturing it on 5 December. HTS then advanced further south towards Homs. On 6 December, in a face-to-face interview with CNN, al-Sharaa declared that the offensive's goal was to remove Assad from power. Using his birth name, he outlined plans for establishing a government grounded in institutions and a "council chosen by the people". He also expressed his intention to facilitate the return of Syrian refugees to their homes and explicitly pledged to protect minority communities. By 8 December, HTS had captured Homs, which effectively cut Assad's forces from Syria's coast. HTS then advanced on Latakia and Tartus, the last two regional capitals held by Ba'athist forces, capturing them without a battle. The same day, opposition forces also captured Damascus, toppling the Assad regime and ending its 54-year-long rule.

== De facto leader of Syria (2024–2025) ==
=== Formation of caretaker government ===
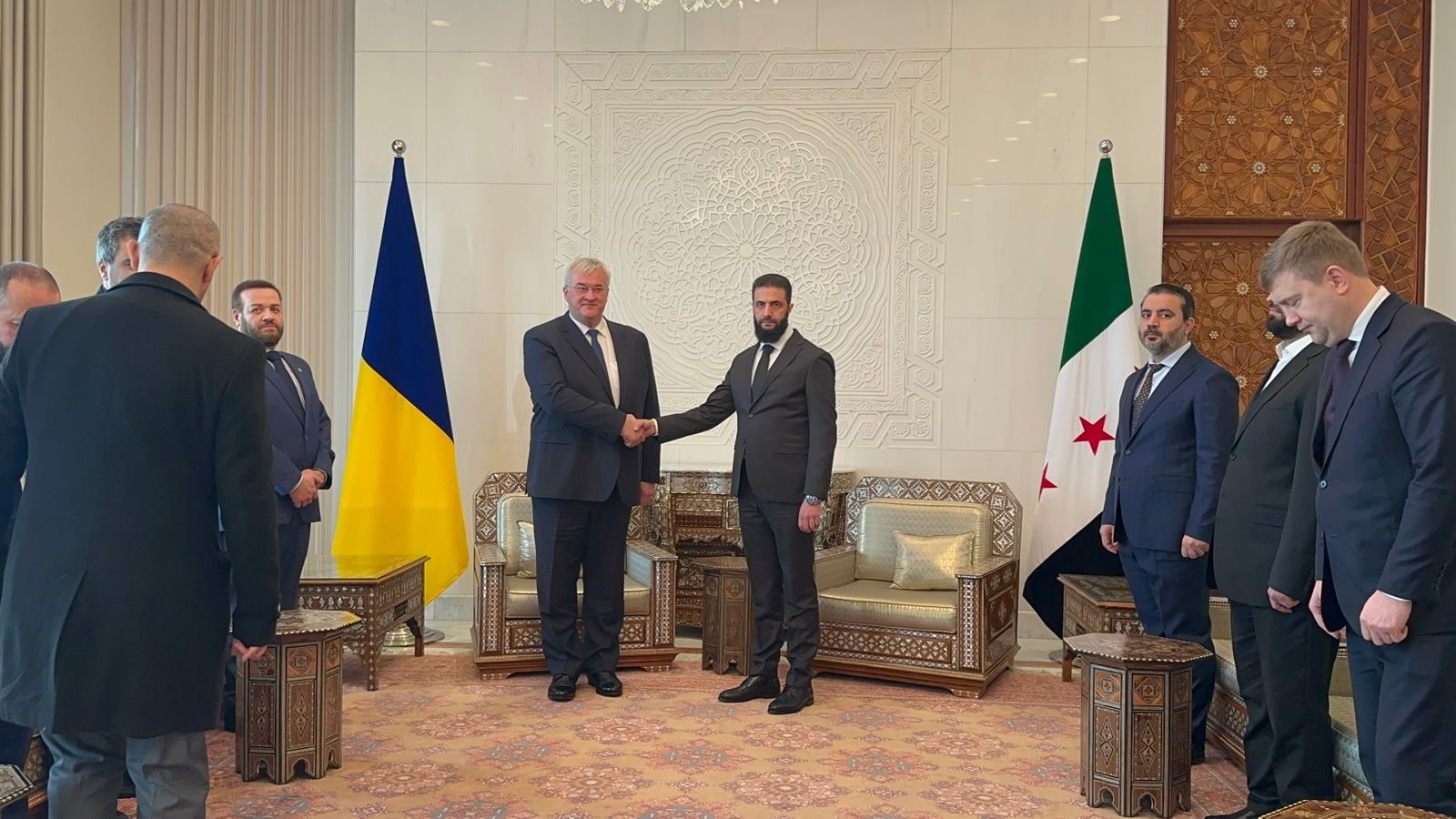
Al-Sharaa with Ukrainian foreign minister Andrii Sybiha, 30 December 2024

On 8 December 2024, al-Sharaa stated on Telegram that Syrian public institutions would not be immediately handed over to military forces but would instead remain temporarily under then–Prime Minister Mohammad Ghazi al-Jalali until they were officially transferred. Al-Jalali announced in a social media video that he had been in contact with al-Sharaa, and would stay in Damascus to discuss the transfer of authority.

Following the fall of Damascus, al-Sharaa delivered a speech at the city's landmark Umayyad Mosque, calling the fall of the Assad regime "a new chapter in the history of the region" and condemning Iran for using Syria as "a playground for Iranian ambitions", characterised by sectarianism and corruption.

After the fall of the Assad regime, al-Sharaa became the country's de facto leader as the emir of Hay'at Tahrir al-Sham and the head of the new Syrian administration. Mohammed al-Bashir, the Prime Minister of the Syrian Salvation Government, was tasked with forming an interim government after meeting with al-Sharaa and al-Jalali to coordinate the transfer of power, and was officially appointed the next day as the prime minister of the Syrian caretaker government.

=== Post-Assad governance ===
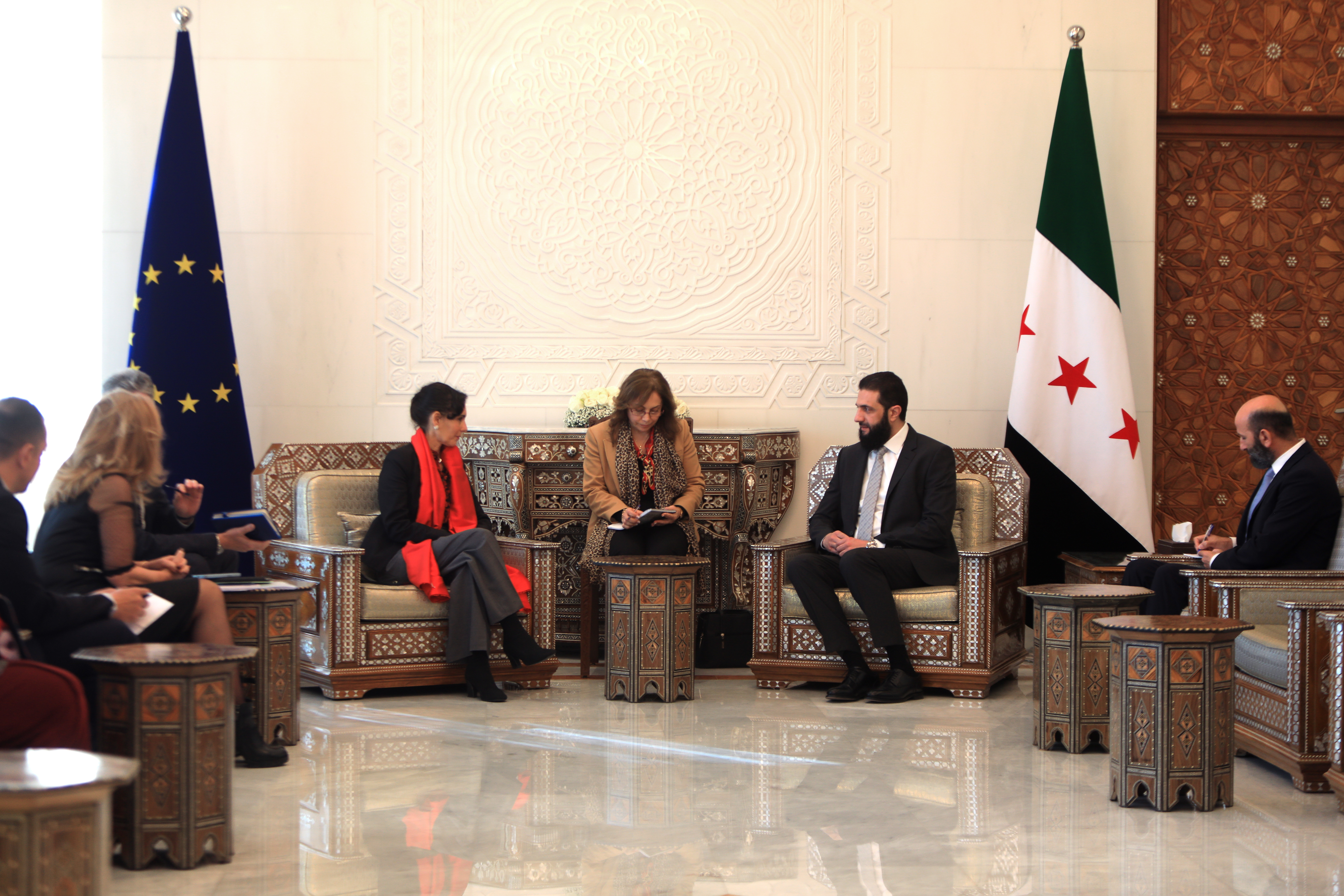
Al-Sharaa with European Commissioner Hadja Lahbib in Damascus, 17 January 2025

Only a few days after the fall of the Assad regime, al-Sharaa met with Turkish officials, marking the first diplomatic delegation to Syria since Assad's overthrow. The United States rescinded a seven-year-old $10 million Rewards for Justice bounty for information leading to al-Sharaa's capture after he met with a U.S. delegation—the first formal U.S. diplomatic presence in Syria in more than a decade—with U.S. Assistant Secretary of State for Near Eastern Affairs Barbara A. Leaf stating that the decision was made to initiate dialogue with HTS and noting that, during discussions in Damascus, al-Sharaa committed to preventing ISIS and other terrorist groups from operating within Syria.

On 24 December, al-Sharaa announced the dissolution and merger of multiple opposition factions, including the Syrian National Army, into the Ministry of Defense, while excluding the Kurdish-led Syrian Democratic Forces due to conflicts with Turkish-backed rebel forces in northeastern Syria. This reorganisation coincided with his efforts to establish new state institutions, including law enforcement and security forces, amid reports of revenge killings and highway banditry, and included the creation of processing centres for former government soldiers and the initiation of police force recruitment. In an interview with al-Arabiya on 29 December, al-Sharaa said that he expected the process of writing a new constitution of Syria to take two or three years, with elections expected after four years.

On 3 January 2025, German Foreign Minister Annalena Baerbock and French Foreign Minister Jean-Noël Barrot became the first top diplomats from European Union member states to visit Damascus since Assad's overthrow, meeting with al-Sharaa to discuss a new political beginning between Europe and Syria. A Russian delegation led by Deputy Foreign Minister Mikhail Bogdanov also visited Damascus on 29 January to meet al-Sharaa, reaffirming Moscow's support for Syria's sovereignty and territorial integrity following the collapse of the Assad regime.

== Presidency (2025–present) ==
=== Appointment ===
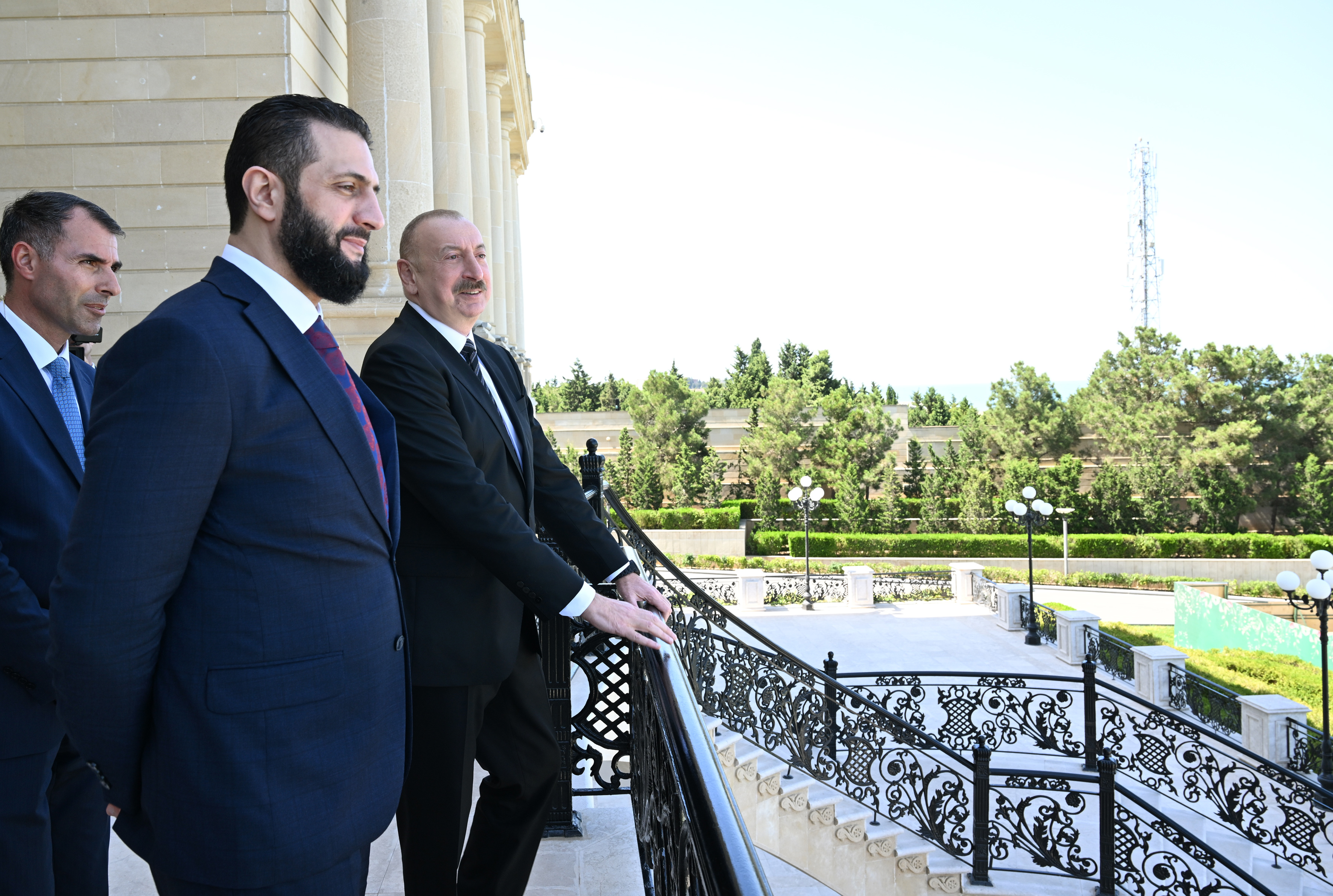
Al-Sharaa with Azerbaijani president Ilham Aliyev, 12 July 2025

On 29 January 2025, during the Syrian Revolution Victory Conference held at the People's Palace in Damascus, Hassan Abdul Ghani, spokesman for the HTS-led Military Operations Command, stated that al-Sharaa had been officially appointed as the president of Syria and would govern the country during the transitional period, assume the duties of the presidency, and represent the nation on the international stage. After his appointment as president, al-Sharaa gave a brief speech outlining the government's immediate priorities— filling the power vacuum, maintaining civil peace, building state institutions, developing the economy, and restoring Syria's international and regional standing—and received congratulations from leaders of many countries, including Afghanistan, Azerbaijan, Canada, Mauritania, Morocco, Russia, Saudi Arabia, and the United Arab Emirates (UAE).

=== Early actions ===
A day after al-Sharaa's appointment as president, Qatari Emir Tamim bin Hamad Al Thani became the first head of state to visit Damascus since the fall of the Assad regime to discuss post-conflict reconstruction and other topics, and on 12 February 2025, al-Sharaa held his first phone call with Russian President Vladimir Putin since the fall of the Assad regime, while also meeting representatives of the Syrian National Coalition and the Syrian Negotiation Commission, including their presidents Hadi al-Bahra and Bader Jamous, with both organisations announced to dissolve under the new authorities.

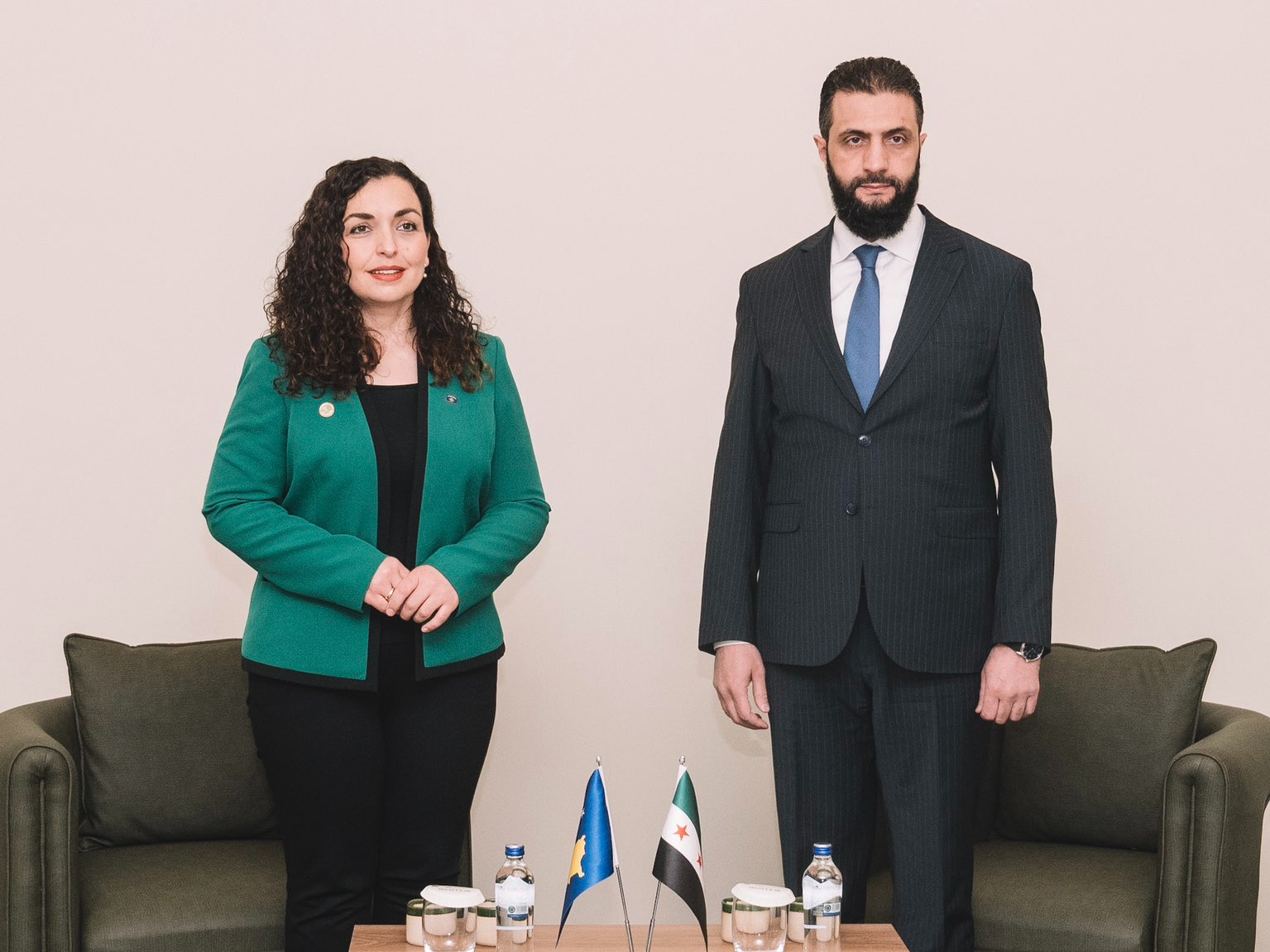
Al-Sharaa with Kosovan president Vjosa Osmani, 11 April 2025

In mid-February, al-Sharaa made his first official trip to the coastal provinces of Latakia and Tartus, former strongholds of the ousted president Bashar al-Assad, and on 21 February, he met with China's ambassador to Damascus, Shi Hongwei, marking the first official interaction between the two nations since Assad's overthrow, while in early June, he visited Daraa Governorate for the first time since the fall of the Assad regime, coinciding with Eid al-Adha, in the city widely known as the "cradle of the revolution" for being the site of the first protests against the Assad regime.

On 12 March 2025, the Syrian caretaker government announced the formation of a National Security Council, to be chaired by al-Sharaa. The next day on 13 March, he signed Syria's constitutional declaration, which set a five-year transitional period, established a presidential system with executive power vested in the president who appoints ministers, and abolished the position of prime minister. It enshrined Islamic law as the main source of jurisprudence while preserving freedoms of opinion and expression, and established the People's Assembly to serve as the Syrian parliament during the transition and oversee the drafting of a new permanent constitution.

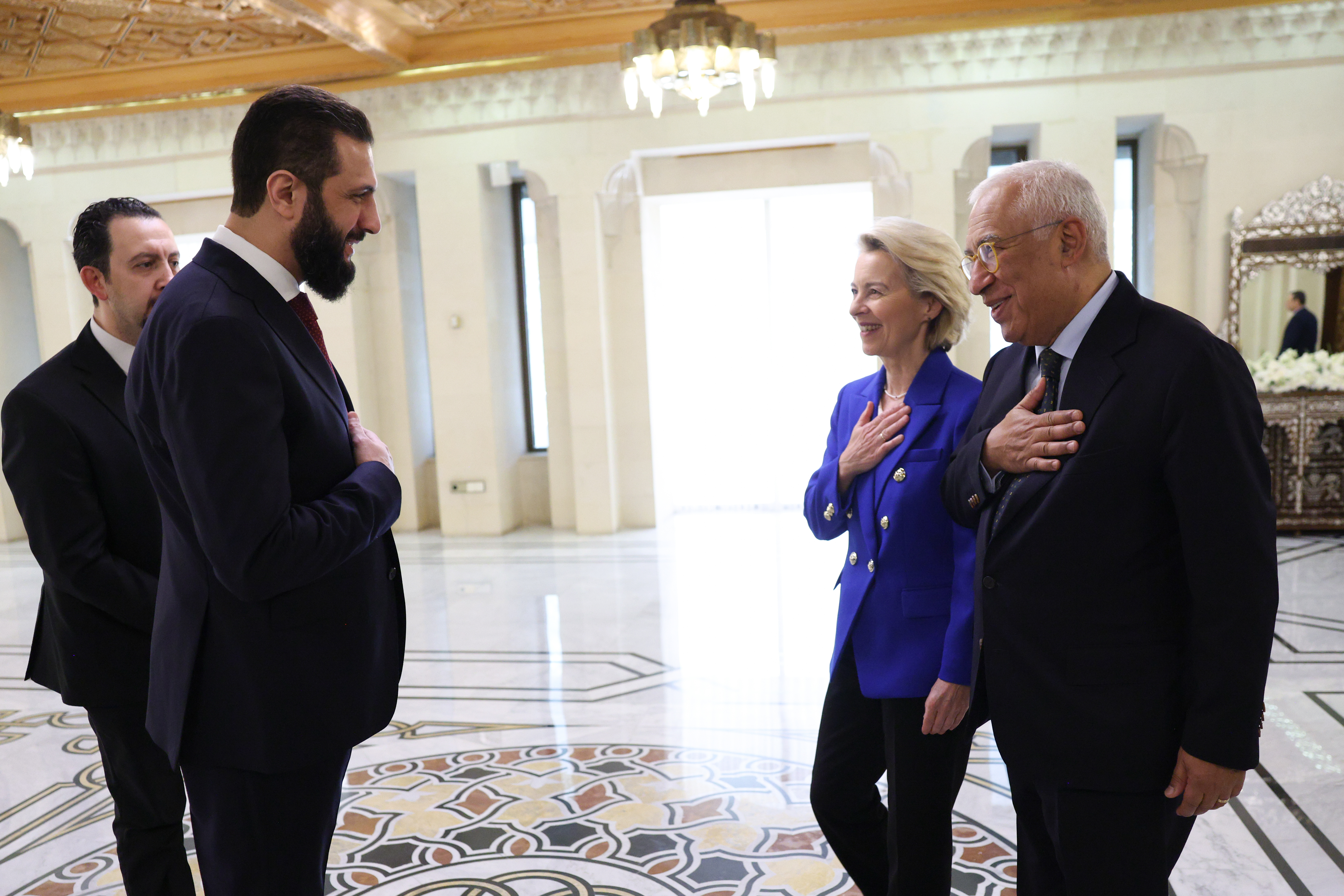
Al-Sharaa with European Commission President Ursula von der Leyen and European Council President António Costa, 9 January 2026

By 6 March 2025, clashes had broken out in coastal Syria between Assad loyalists and government forces, marking the worst violence since the Assad regime was toppled. Al-Sharaa urged pro-government fighters to "avoid any abuses" following reports of massacres of Alawite civilians in Latakia, and on 9 March, he announced the formation of an independent national committee of seven judges to investigate the events and violations in the Syrian coastal areas, emphasising that the committee must submit its findings to the president within 30 days and describing the coastal violence as part of the "expected challenges." In July 2025, armed clashes broke out in Suwayda between the Syrian Druze and government-affiliated troops, shortly after the ceasefire took effect, al-Sharaa addressed the nation, criticising Israel for its airstrikes on Damascus and its attacks on government forces and civilian facilities, while expressing gratitude to American, Turkish, and Arab mediators for helping de-escalate the conflict.

On 10 March 2025, al-Sharaa signed an agreement with Mazloum Abdi, commander-in-chief of the Syrian Democratic Forces (SDF), to integrate the organisation into state institutions and bring northeastern Syria under central government control, but negotiations remained inconclusive throughout 2025. After clashes in Aleppo in January 2026, he recognised the Syrian Kurds as an essential part of the nation, declaring Kurdish a national language and Newroz a national holiday. His administration launched a military campaign against the SDF, initially in the eastern Aleppo Governorate around Deir Hafir and Maskanah, before expanding to Raqqa, Deir ez-Zor, and Al-Hasakah. He announced ceasefires on 20 and 30 January 2026, before signing a peace agreement that included plans to integrate the SDF into the government. On 20 August 2026, Abdi declared that integration of its civil institutions into the Syrian government had been completed. On 25 August, Abdi, alongside YPJ commander Newroz Ahmed and co-president of the DAANES Executive Council, Îlham Ehmed, travelled to Damascus for a day of discussions, following which Abdi gave a press conference in which he declared the integration of the SDF into the Syrian state and its formal dissolution.

=== Administration and cabinet ===
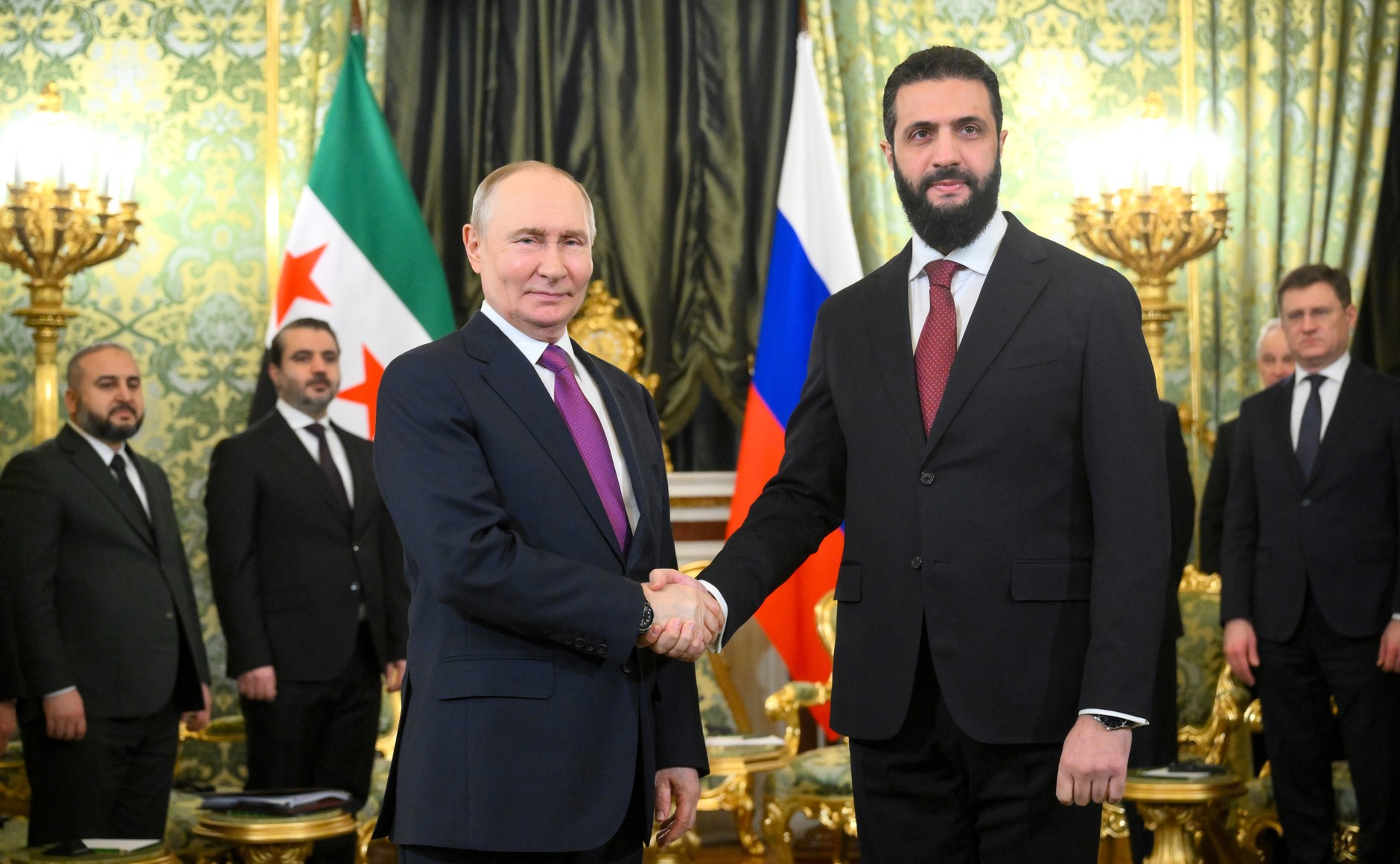
Al-Sharaa with Russian president Vladimir Putin, 28 January 2026

On 29 March 2025, al-Sharaa announced the formation of Syria's transitional government during a ceremony at the People's Palace in Damascus, where the newly appointed ministers took their oaths and presented their plans, replacing the Syrian caretaker government. The new administration included four ministers from minority communities— Yarub Badr, an Alawite; Amjad Badr, a Druze; Hind Kabawat, a Christian; and Mohammad Abdulrahman Tarkou, a Kurd—as well as figures from different former opposition groups, such as Mohammed Abu al-Khair Shukri, former member of the Syrian National Coalition and the new Minister of Endowments, and Raed al-Saleh, former Director of the White Helmets and the new Minister of Disaster Management and Emergency Response. The transitional government was described by some observers as technocratic, with ministers chosen according to their competencies, by al-Sharaa.

On 9 May 2026, as part of a partial cabinet reshuffle, al-Sharaa appointed Khaled Fawaz Zaarour and Basel al-Suweydan as the Ministers of Information and Agriculture, replacing Hamza al-Mustafa and Amjad Badr, respectively. The reshuffle was the first since the overthrow of former president Bashar al-Assad.

=== Foreign relations ===
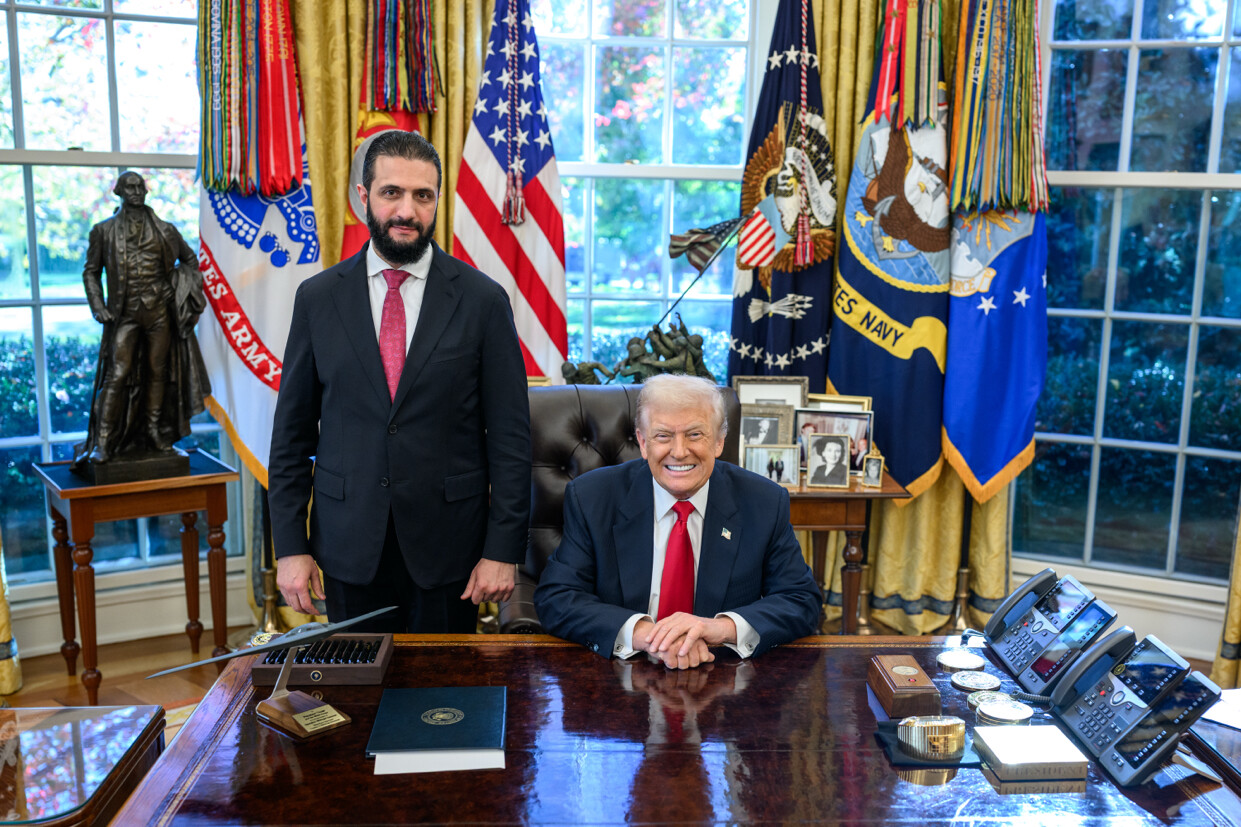
U.S. President Donald Trump with al-Sharaa in the Oval Office on 10 November 2025. The visit marked the first time a Syrian president had visited the White House since Syria gained independence in 1946.

After being appointed as president, al-Sharaa made a trip abroad, visiting Azerbaijan, Bahrain, Jordan, Kuwait, Saudi Arabia, Egypt, France, Qatar, Turkey, the United States, and the United Arab Emirates. He attended the emergency summit of the Arab League, the fourth Antalya Diplomacy Forum, and the 2025 Arab–Islamic extraordinary summit.

On 2 February 2025, al-Sharaa and Foreign Minister Asaad al-Shaibani visited Saudi Arabia and met with Saudi Crown Prince Mohammed bin Salman, marking al-Sharaa's first foreign visit since the fall of the Assad regime. On 7 May 2025, he met with French President Emmanuel Macron in Paris on his first official visit to Europe since becoming president of Syria, and on 14 May, he met with U.S. President Donald Trump in Riyadh— the first meeting between American and Syrian presidents since Bill Clinton and Hafez al-Assad met in Geneva in 2000—during which Trump urged him to join the Abraham Accords. On 28 January 2026, al-Sharaa met with Putin in Moscow for the second time to discuss Russia's military presence in Syria, during which Putin reaffirmed Moscow's support for Syria's unity and territorial integrity, congratulated Damascus on recent political developments, and expressed hope that the return of the Jazira region would advance the full restoration of Syrian sovereignty, while both sides also emphasised continued economic and reconstruction cooperation.

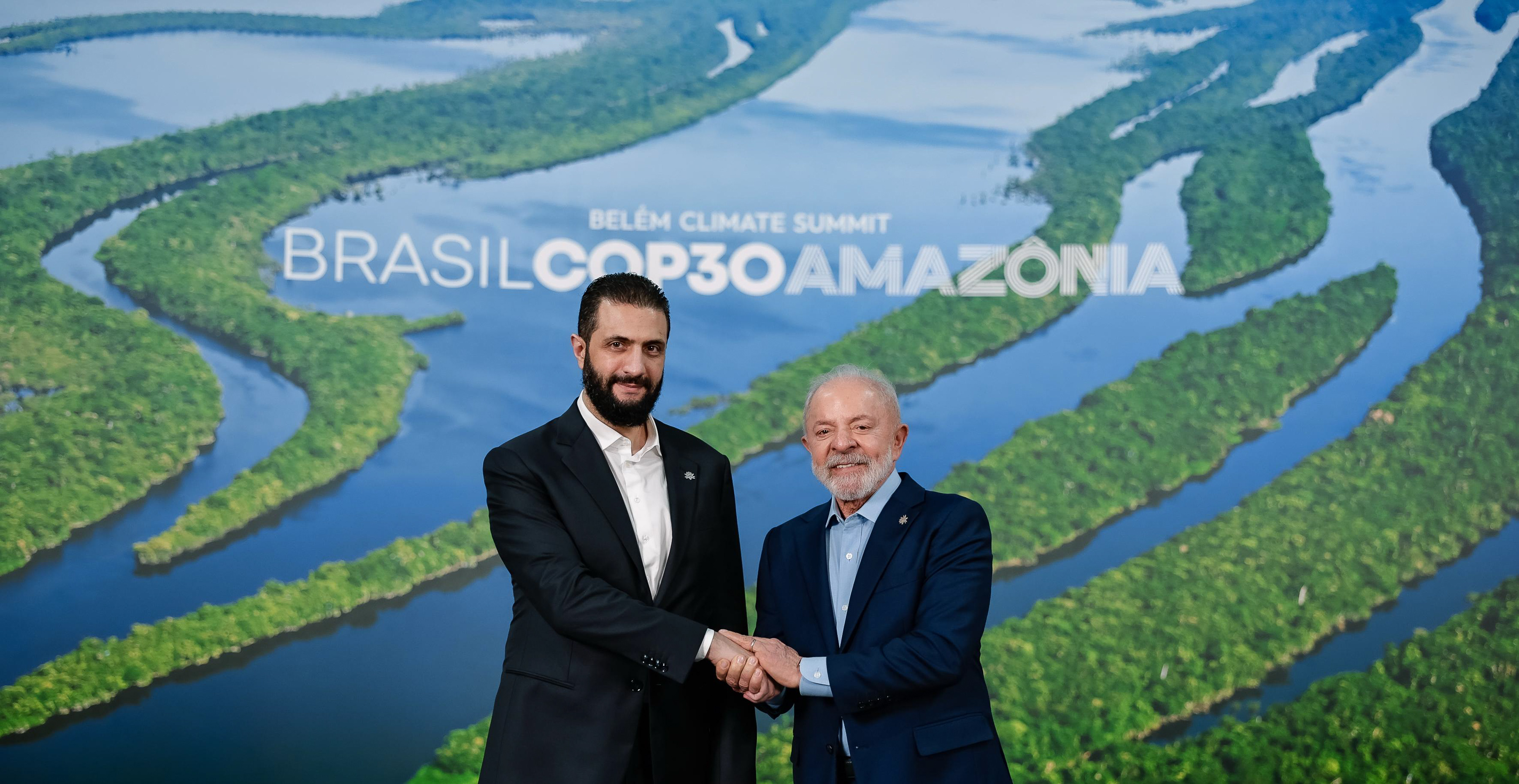
Al-Sharaa and Brazilian President Luiz Inácio Lula da Silva during the COP30 summit in Belém, 6 November 2025

=== Easing sanctions on Syria ===
Since 2011, several countries and international bodies have imposed sanctions on Syria under Bashar al-Assad's rule, mainly due to the Ba'athist regime's violent crackdown on civilians during the Syrian civil war. In an interview with The New York Times in April 2025, al-Sharaa stated that the sanctions should be permanently lifted, as they were imposed on the Assad regime. He noted that the sanctions were damaging his government and slowing economic recovery.

In November 2025, with the support of the United States and other countries, the UN Security Council removed al-Sharaa and his Interior Minister Anas Khattab from the sanctions list of the ISIL and Al-Qaida Sanctions Committee. On 7 November, the United States also delisted him from its Specially Designated Global Terrorist (SDGT) sanctions list, while the United Kingdom announced the removal of both al-Sharaa and Anas Khattab from its consolidated sanctions list, stating that he was no longer subject to asset freezes.

== Political positions ==
=== Views on Bashar al-Assad's handover to Syria ===
In an interview with The New York Times in April 2025, al-Sharaa said that Syrian officials requested Russia to extradite Assad as a condition for allowing their military presence in Syria, but Russia refused. In a September 2025 interview with 60 Minutes, al-Sharaa said he still intended to pursue justice against Bashar al-Assad through legal means.

In a Fox News interview on 10 November 2025, al-Sharaa said that Russia had a different view on sending wanted individuals back to Syria, but he stressed that justice must be carried out through a transitional justice committee to ensure accountability for all perpetrators, including Assad. In a November 2025 interview with The Washington Post, al-Sharaa said that the issue of Bashar al-Assad remained sensitive for Russia, with Syria's relationship with Moscow still in its early stages and emphasised that "Syria will preserve its right to demand Assad's trial."

=== Views on Syria ===
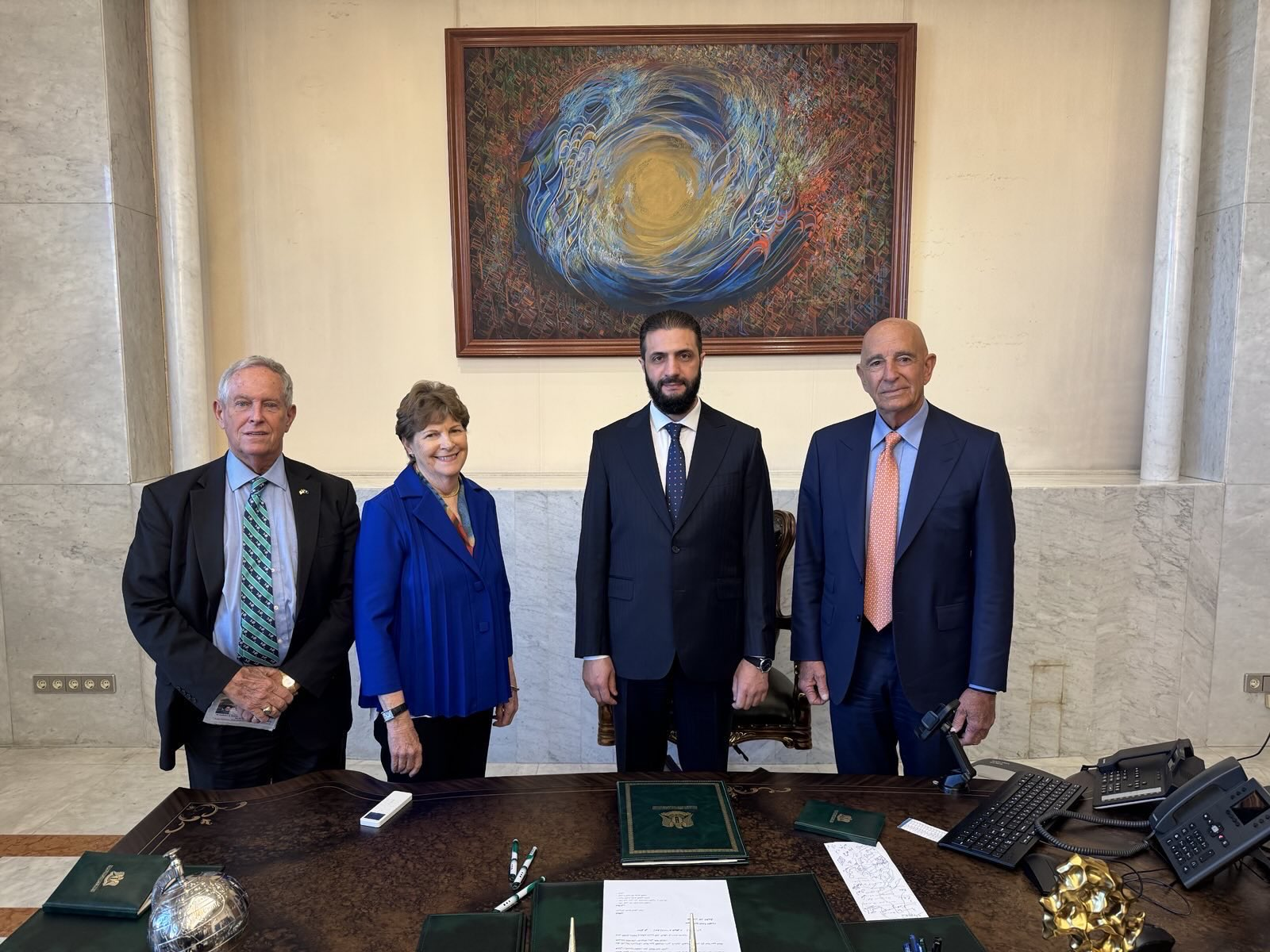
Al‑Sharaa with U.S. Congressman Joe Wilson, U.S. Senator Jeanne Shaheen, and U.S. envoy to Syria Tom Barrack, August 2025

In an interview with Al Arabiya, al-Sharaa spoke about his ambitions for Syria's economic development. Al-Sharaa said that Syria needs "experts who know the country's assets and try to benefit from all the experiences of the world, so as to come up with something that suits the nature of the society." He said that after the fall of the Assad regime, there are "major investment and economic opportunities" for all neighbouring countries that can implement joint economic projects with the new Syrian administration, and predicted that Saudi Arabia would have a very large role in Syria's economic development. Regarding the sanctions imposed on Syria, al-Sharaa said he had wished the incoming U.S. administration, led by Donald Trump, would lift them. He said that one of his top priorities is to rebuild the economy by issuing a new currency after the value of the current currency had stabilised.

On 14 December, al-Sharaa stressed in his statements that the next phase, after the fall of the Assad regime, will be an opportunity to serve the Syrian people and build the future. He explained that there is no justification for any foreign intervention after the withdrawal of Iranian forces from Syria, condemning the "Iranian project" as harmful, and declaring that the victory in Syria is a victory over this project. He also stressed that what happened in Syria was not a coincidence but the result of long preparations. He stated that Russia had become frustrated with the Assad regime and that the change in authority represented an opportunity for Russia to build a new relationship with Syria. Regarding Syrian leadership, he pointed out the need to move away from the mentality of revolution and move towards a state of law and institutions. Al-Sharaa stated to Al Jazeera Arabic that the choices of governance will be discussed among a group of legal experts; and then public elections would be held to make the final choice.

In an interview with the BBC, al-Sharaa discussed his plans and said that Syria is not like the Taliban. He said that their way of leading the country is different because Afghanistan has a tribal system, while the people and way of thinking in Syria are not the same. He also stated that the new Syrian government will follow its own history and culture in its governance.

In his first interview as president on 9 February 2025, al-Sharaa told The Economist that he opposed the federalisation of Syria. He also mentioned that Turkey was planning a full-scale operation in the north against Kurdish forces but had asked them to wait to allow for negotiations. In response to a question about whether Sharia could be implemented, he stated, "That decision rests with the experts. If they approve it, my duty is to enforce it; if they reject it, my duty is to uphold their decision as well." When asked if Syria would become a democracy, he responded, "In our region, there are various definitions of democracy. If democracy means that the people decide who will rule them and who represents them in parliament, then yes, Syria is moving in that direction."

In an interview with The New York Times in April 2025, al-Sharaa stated that his government was considering granting citizenship to foreign fighters who had lived in Syria for many years and supported the revolution. Furthermore, he said that his government was negotiating with Turkey and Russia regarding their military presence in Syria and suggested that both countries might eventually provide military support to the new Syrian government.

On 27 May 2025, during the "Aleppo, the Key to Victory" event celebrating the Syrian revolution and the liberation of Aleppo, al-Sharaa exhorted the Syrian people to help reconstruct the country: "Our war against tyrants has ended, and our battle against poverty has begun."

In a September 2025 interview with 60 Minutes, al-Sharaa said elections would be held once Syria's infrastructure and citizens' records are restored. He stated that he wants Syria to be a place where every person can vote. He added that rebuilding Syria is a top state priority and emphasised the need for international support. He said Syria has reshaped its political identity after years of isolation and is now pursuing balanced relations with the West, the United States, and regional powers such as Saudi Arabia and Turkey, adding that its calm and stable ties with Russia and China, built on shared strategic interests, align rather than conflict with its relations with Western nations.

In a November 2025 interview with The Washington Post, al-Sharaa said Syria is emerging from a long war and decades of dictatorship and is in a transitional phase. He compared the country's rebuilding to the long recovery after the American Civil War. He also said that some groups push their own interests and seek autonomy by claiming threats to their sect or creed, adding, "In Syria, we have been living in coexistence with different groups and different religious communities for 1,400 years. We're still here, and we still have that diversity."

On 6 December 2025, at the Doha Forum, al-Sharaa told CNN that Syria was moving towards stability and economic recovery following the revolution and the transition to a new system of governance. He noted that his government was working with the United States to lift the Caesar Act and explained that the National Dialogue Conference held after the liberation had resulted in a provisional constitution granting him a five-year mandate to pass new laws before a new permanent constitution was drafted ahead of elections scheduled in four years. He spoke about civil rights, stating that Syria had closed oppressive prisons such as Sednaya Prison and was committed to women's empowerment, with women fully participating in society, government, and the People's Assembly. He also spoke about engaging with Alawites, Druze, and other minorities, stressing that every sector of Syrian society had suffered under the Assad regime and that all of them took part in the revolution that brought it down. Al-Sharaa highlighted the need to uphold the rule of law in Syria, saying that it is "the way to guarantee everybody's rights, including the rights of all minorities".

On 10 January 2026, al-Sharaa said in an interview with Shams TV that the government was engaged in dialogue with the Syrian Democratic Forces (SDF). He said that the 10 March agreement protects Kurdish rights and culture, strengthens state authority across Syria, and has wide regional and international support. Al-Sharaa stressed that the Kurdish community should be protected through integration into the Syrian state, not through armed groups, with rights guaranteed by the constitution and participation based on ability. He reaffirmed Syria's commitment to the agreement and called on the SDF to integrate, stating that unity and the rule of law are essential for Syria's stability. Al-Sharaa said that in their first meeting, he told SDF general commander Mazloum Abdi that if the goal was to secure Kurdish rights, there was no need for bloodshed, as those rights would be guaranteed by the constitution. He stated that North and East Syria holds most of Syria's main resources, including oil, gas, water, agriculture, and energy. He added that SDF control had blocked the state from accessing these resources, damaging the economy and slowing reconstruction, despite the urgent need to improve living conditions.

=== Views on Israel and Palestine ===
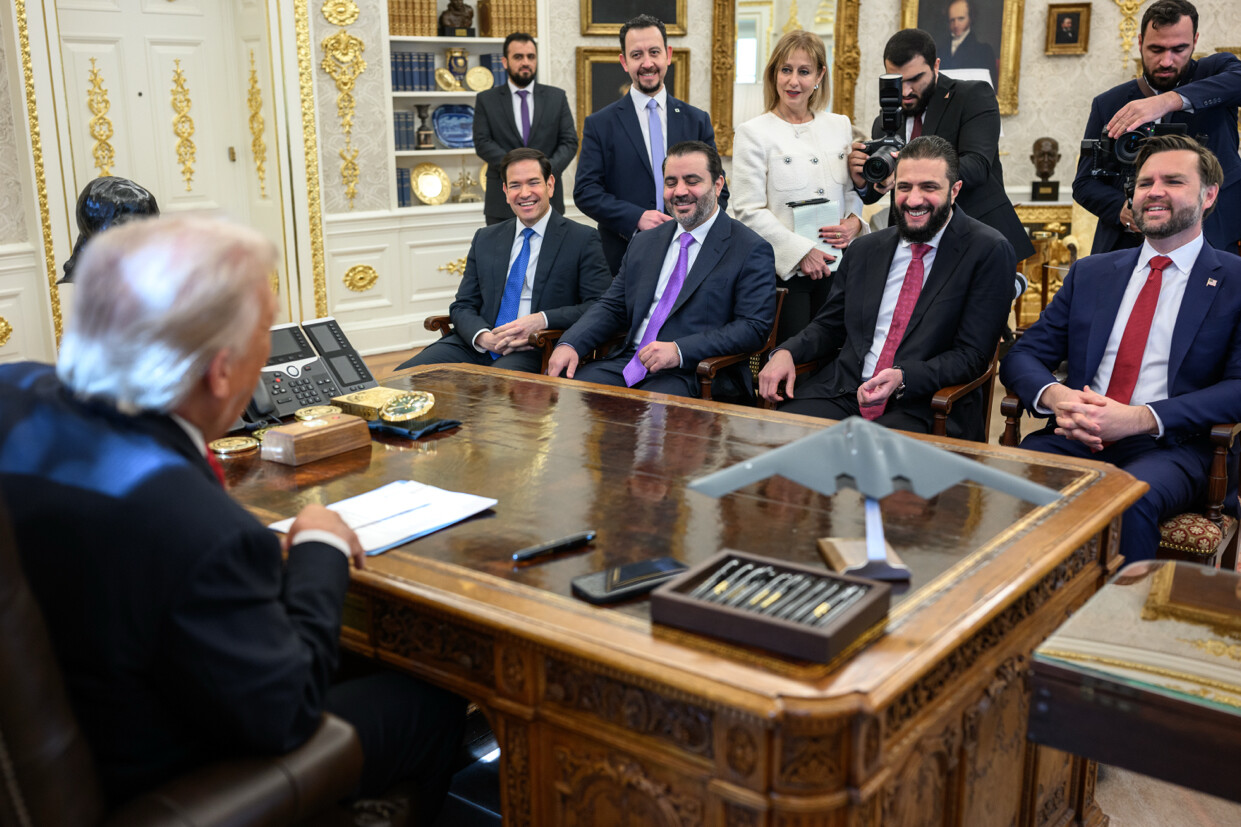
Al-Sharaa in the Oval Office with U.S. Secretary of State Marco Rubio, Syrian Foreign Minister Asaad al-Shaibani, U.S. Vice President JD Vance, and U.S. President Donald Trump, 10 November 2025

Al-Sharaa has stated that he believes in a commitment to defending the Palestinians, and that the displacement of his family from the Golan Heights as well as the Second Intifada in 2000 had a strong impact on his life choices. During a speech to exhort HTS fighters in January 2018, he declared: "If Allah wills it, we will reach not only Damascus, but Jerusalem awaits us as well."

In an interview with Syria TV regarding the ongoing Israeli invasion of Syria, al-Sharaa declared that after the fall of the Assad regime, Israel no longer has "any excuses" for attacking Syrian territory. He emphasised that diplomacy was the only way to ensure security and cautioned against "ill-considered military adventures". In an interview with The New York Times in December 2024, al-Sharaa reaffirmed Syria's commitment to the 1974 Agreement. He stated, "Israel entered Syria under the pretext of the Iranian presence, and its pretext has now ended."

On 14 December 2024, al-Sharaa clarified that his administration was not interested in engaging in a new conflict with Israel, emphasising that Syria's priority was rebuilding after years of war. He noted that the country's deteriorating situation did not permit further hostilities and that maintaining state stability was paramount. Al-Sharaa stressed that diplomatic solutions were the only viable path to ensuring security and long-term stability in the region.

On 11 February 2025, al-Sharaa stated in an interview with The Rest Is Politics that Trump's proposed United States takeover of the Gaza Strip would not succeed, asserting that no power can drive people from their land. He noted that many countries had tried and failed, especially during the recent war in Gaza. His statement came after a joint press conference in which Trump declared that the U.S. would "take over the Gaza Strip; we'll own it."

On 4 March 2025, at the extraordinary Arab League summit on Gaza, al-Sharaa condemned calls for the forced displacement of Palestinians, calling them a threat to all Arabs. On 26 August 2025, al-Sharaa said his country would not join the Abraham Accords, stressing that its dispute with Israel is very different from the conflicts experienced by other Arab nations.

"Israel occupied the Golan Heights in order to protect Israel, and now they are imposing conditions in the south of Syria in order to protect the Golan Heights. So after a few years, maybe they will occupy the center of Syria in order to protect the south of Syria. They will reach Munich on that pathway[...]"

— Ahmed al-Sharaa (11 November 2025)

In a September 2025 interview with 60 Minutes, al-Sharaa said Syria poses no threat to Israel and denounced Israeli strikes on the People's Palace as "a declaration of war". He warned that Israel's provocations could drag Syria into war and push U.S. allies to seek alternatives. He urged Israel to withdraw from areas seized after 8 December 2024, and said Syria has made no provocations or threats toward Israel. He added that "the current Israeli government is extremist and guided by expansionist doctrines," believing that "Israel has the right to establish a larger state than it is now and seeks to expand into Gaza and the West Bank, then north and south." He also said Israel refuses to allow the return of UN forces to the 1974 disengagement lines and is trying to impose "a new format for the security arrangement." He emphasised that Syria seeks a peaceful solution protecting its territorial integrity and rightful claim to the occupied Golan heights, warning that Israel's expansionist ambitions could impact Jordan, Iraq, Turkey, and Egypt, and reshape regional alliances.

In a Fox News interview on 10 November 2025, al-Sharaa said that Syria's situation is different from other signatories because it borders Israel, which has occupied the Golan Heights since 1967. He added that the Trump administration could help Syria make a security agreement with Israel or return to the 1974 Agreement on Disengagement. In a November 2025 Washington Post interview, al-Sharaa said that Syria is negotiating directly with Israel and has made good progress, but a final agreement requires Israel to return to its pre–8 December borders. He added that the United States and many other international parties, including Trump, support Syria's position while working to reach a solution quickly.

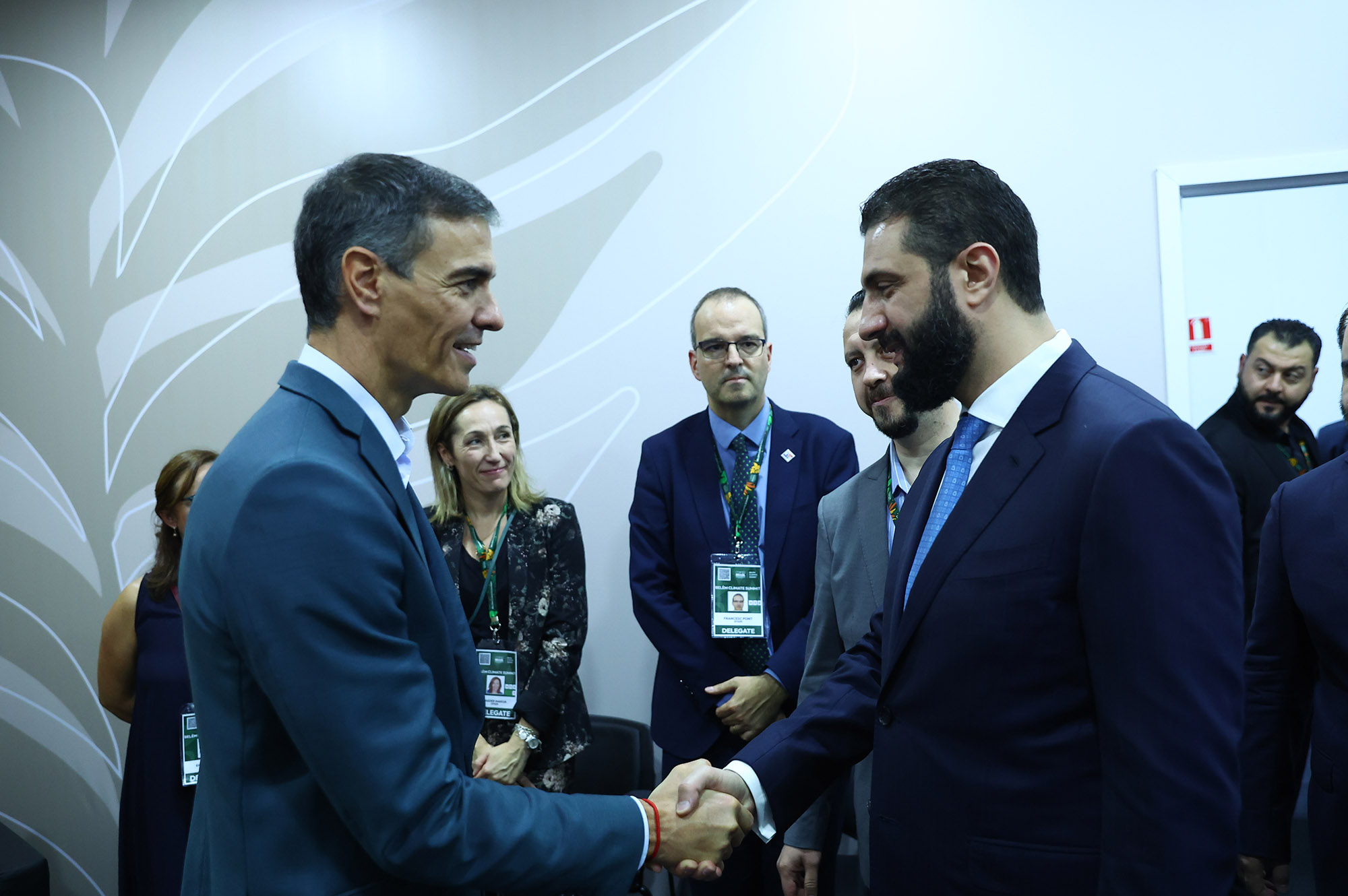
Al-Sharaa and Spanish Prime Minister Pedro Sánchez, 7 November 2025

On 6 December 2025, al-Sharaa told the Doha Forum that any deal with Israel must protect Syria's interests. He accused Israel of using its situation to avoid responsibility for the Gaza massacres and said Syria is working with major powers to pressure Israel to withdraw from areas taken after 8 December 2024. He stressed the need for Israel to adhere to the 1974 Disengagement Agreement and added that the demand for a demilitarised zone raises many questions, including who would protect it if the Syrian Army were not allowed to be present. He also confirmed that there are talks with Israel involving the United States.

=== Views on Iran ===
Since the fall of the Assad regime, al-Sharaa has made several statements regarding Iran's involvement in Syria. For many years, Syria and Iran maintained a strategic alliance, with Damascus serving as a key component of Iran's "Axis of Resistance". In an interview with Asharq Al-Awsat published on 20 December 2024, al-Sharaa asserted that under Bashar al-Assad, Syria became a platform for Iran to exert influence over major Arab capitals, expand conflicts, and destabilise Gulf nations through activities such as drug trafficking, including the distribution of Captagon. He described Iran's regional ambitions as detrimental and framed the developments in Syria as a setback for Iran's influence in the region. "What we have done and achieved with the least possible damage and losses," he stated, adding that "the Iranian project in the region has been set back 40 years." In February 2025, al-Sharaa condemned Iran and its "Axis of Resistance" as a "strategic threat to the entire region".

== Public image ==
In 2025, Time 100 listed him as one of the world's most influential people, and Agence France-Presse noted that he made global headlines that year. In the same year, The Economist awarded its country of the year title to Syria, under al-Sharaa's rule, noting that he had generated a "series of positive surprises". In 2026, al-Sharaa was recognized as one of the world's 500 most influential Muslims by The Muslim 500, an annual publication by the Royal Islamic Strategic Studies Centre, based in Amman, Jordan.

=== Public opinion ===
A YouGov opinion poll commissioned in 2026 by the Council for a Secure America showed largely favourable views of al-Sharaa's presidency among Syrians, with 69% of respondents rating his performance as "good," 12% rating it poorly, and 19% saying they were undecided.

== Personal life ==
Not much is known about al-Sharaa's personal life, which he is careful not to share with the media. In 2012, Time reported that in one of the meetings of prominent Islamist militant groups attended by the leaders of Ahrar al-Sham, Suqour al-Sham, Liwa al-Islam, and other rebel brigades, al-Sharaa wore a mask, refusing to reveal his identity, and was introduced to the attendees by Jabhat al-Nusra's emirs in Aleppo and Idlib. Al-Sharaa met his wife Latifa al-Droubi while they were both studying at Damascus University. They were married in 2012 and have three children. On 1 April 2026, during al-Sharaa's visit to the United Kingdom, he participated in an interview at Chatham House. During the interview, he clarified that he has one daughter, along with two sons. When asked whether he would want his daughter to become a future president of Syria, al-Sharaa stated that running public affairs is a major responsibility and that he would not wish the role on any of his children. Al-Sharaa plays chess, basketball, and goes horse riding, while he reportedly played football in his childhood. In a November 2025 interview with The Washington Post, al-Sharaa said he admired Michael Jordan and the National Basketball Association, preferred baseball to football, and was skilled at playing pool.

=== Assassination attempts and death threats ===
The U.S. Special Envoy for Syria, Tom Barrack, warned of a possible assassination attempt against al-Sharaa due to his efforts to build ties with the West and promote inclusive governance. On 12 June 2025, L'Orient–Le Jour reported that al-Sharaa had escaped two assassination attempts by ISIS. On 27 June 2025, al-Sharaa was reportedly the target of an ISIS-backed assassination attempt. It was planned to be carried out in the Daraa Governorate, but was foiled before it could be executed. However, the government denied reports of the assassination attempt. On 16 July 2025, Itamar Ben-Gvir, Israel's Minister of National Security, publicly urged for al-Sharaa's assassination, referring to him as the "head of the snake" and stating that "the only thing that can be done is to eliminate al-Julani." On 10 November 2025, Syria thwarted two attempts on al-Sharaa's life by the Islamic State. On 5 January 2026, the Israel Defense Forces (IDF) claimed that Iran, along with additional "hostile elements", was planning to assassinate al-Sharaa. On 12 February 2026, the United Nations and its secretary-general, António Guterres, said that al-Sharaa, along with Anas Khattab and Asaad al-Shaibani, were the targets of five foiled ISIS assassination attempts within the previous year on their lives. On 6 March 2026, Reuters reported that Turkey's National Intelligence Organisation had asked Britain's MI6 the previous month to take a larger role in protecting al-Sharaa following recent assassination plots. However, Turkey denied that its intelligence organisation had made any such request.

== Documentary ==
On 1 June 2021, PBS Frontline released a documentary, The Jihadist, investigating al-Sharaa's past in the context of the ongoing Syrian civil war. In the interview, reflecting on his past affiliation with al-Qaeda, U.S. foreign policy in the Middle East and the Palestinian cause, al-Sharaa commented:

The history of the region and what it went through over the past 20 or 30 years needs to be taken into consideration... We are talking about a region ruled by tyrants, by people who rule with iron fists and their security apparatuses. At the same time, this region is surrounded by numerous conflicts and wars... We can't take a segment of this history and say so-and-so joined al-Qaeda. There are thousands of people who joined al-Qaeda, but let us ask what was the reason behind these people joining al-Qaeda? That's the question. Are the U.S. policies after World War II toward the region partially responsibility for driving people towards al-Qaeda? And are the European policies in the region responsible for the reactions of people who sympathise with the Palestinian cause or with the way the Zionist regime deals with the Palestinians?... Are the broken and oppressed peoples who had to endure what happened in Iraq, for example, or in Afghanistan, are they responsible?... Our involvement with al-Qaeda in the past was an era, and it ended, and even at that time when we were with al-Qaeda, we were against external attacks, and it's completely against our policies to carry out external operations from Syria to target European or American people. This was not part of our calculations at all, and we did not do it at all.

== Bibliography ==
On Salafi jihadist online forums, there are essays and articles attributed to al-Sharaa under the pseudonym "Abdullah bin Muhammad", including The Strategy of the Regional War.

== Notes ==
Political offices
Preceded by Himself as De facto leader	President of Syria; 2025–present	Incumbent
Preceded by Bashar al-Assad as President	De facto leader of Syria; 2024–2025	Succeeded by Himself as President
