= Casualties of the Syrian civil war spillover in Lebanon =

== 2011 ==
In the unrest of June 2011, at least 7 deaths were reported. A further 2–3 deaths occurred during the incidents of February 2012.

Since May 2012, violent incidents have resulted in at least 789 fatalities and more than 2,700 injuries.

== 2012 ==
- 12–18 May 2012: 12 people were killed and 100 others wounded in clashes between the Bab al-Tabbaneh and Jabal Mohsen neighborhoods in Tripoli.
- 20 May 2012: A Lebanese Sunni cleric was killed along with his aid in Akkar, north Lebanon, while 3 were killed and 8 were wounded in Beirut's Tariq Jdideh neighbourhood.
- 28 May 2012: One person was killed in Batroun.
- 30 May 2012: Two people were wounded in Tripoli.
- Early June: Two Hezbollah fighters were killed in a clash with Syrian rebels.
- 2–3 June 2012: 15 people were killed and over 60 others were wounded in Tripoli.
- 8 June 2012: One person was killed and three others were wounded in Tripoli.
- 16 June 2012: One person was killed and either others were wounded in the Nahr al-Bared Palestinian refugee camp.
- 18 June 2012: Three people were killed and 15 others were wounded in clashes between Palestinians and the Lebanese Army.
- 18 July 2012: One person was killed and several wounded in Tripoli during anti-Assad celebrations.
- 27 July 2012: Two people were killed and 15 others were wounded in Tripoli.
- 8 August 2012: Five people were wounded in clashes in Siddon between supporters and detractors of the Syrian government.
- 9 August 2012: Three people were killed and 10 others were wounded in clashes in north Lebanon between Sunni supporters of Hezbollah and Salafists.
- 20–24 August 2012: 17 people were killed and more than 120 others were wounded in clashes in Tripoli.
- 19 October 2012: Brigadier General Wissam al-Hassan, chief of the Intelligence Bureau of the Internal Security Forces, was killed along with two other people in a car-bomb explosion in Beirut. 78 other people were wounded. The Syrian Government was blamed for the attack.
- 19–23 October 2012: 13 people were killed and 65 others were wounded in clashes in Tripoli, that were caused by the bombing.
- 11 November 2012: Three people were killed and four others were wounded in between supporters of Hizbullah and Salafist cleric Sheikh Ahmed al-Asir in Sidon.
- 4–9 December 2012: 19 people were killed and more than 140 others were wounded in clashes in Tripoli.

== 2013 ==
- 3 January 2013: One person was killed and three hurt during clashes in Sidon.
- 1 February 2013: 3 people were killed during clashes in Ersal
- 20–24 March 2013: 12 people were killed and at least 30 wounded in fighting in Tripoli.
- 3 April 2013: One person was lightly wounded in Tripoli when Pro-FSA gunmen opened fire on a convoy of tanker trucks believed to be carrying fuel meant to supply the Syrian government.
- 13 April 2013: One Syrian woman was wounded when gunmen fired gunshots at a car at the Masnaa border crossing with Syria. Some Lebanese media were unable to identify the perpetrators, but anti-Syrian channels accused Hezbollah.
- 14 April–28 May 2013: Three people have been killed and eight injured by shelling of the Hermel region.
- 14 May 2013: Five people were killed and 20 injured during clashes in Tripoli.
- 19–26 May 2013: At least 31 people have been killed and 204 injured during clashes in Tripoli. Three soldiers were among the dead and 15 were wounded.
- 26 May 2013: Two rockets landed in Southern Beirut on 26 May, injuring five people. The Lebanese government believes the attacks were an "act of sabotage". The assailants who fired these rockets are unknown.
- 28 May 2013: Three Lebanese soldiers were killed by unknown gunmen in an ambush east of Arsal.
- 30 May 2013: Fighting between Amal supporters and Palestinian gunmen erupted in the Farhat neighborhood of Beirut's southern suburbs, casualties unknown.
- 2 June 2013: A clash between FSA and Hezbollah fighters in the Bekaa Valley reportedly led to the deaths of one Hezbollah fighter and fifteen FSA fighters, according to Lebanese security sources.
- 3–4 June 2013: The attempted assassination of two pro-Hezbollah Sunni leaders in Lebanon triggered a fresh round of clashes in Tripoli. Eight people were killed, including a policeman, and at least 70 were injured. An additional five members of the Lebanese Army and ISF were injured when the vehicle they were riding in was ambushed by gunmen in Tripoli's Al-Malloula.
- 5 June 2013: 11 rockets fired from the anti-Lebanon mountain range along the border with Syria landed in Baalbek, damaging various locations around the city. At least five people were injured in the barrage.
- 6–7 June 2013: One person was killed and nine were injured, two of them Lebanese Army soldiers, during clashes in Tripoli. Meanwhile, in Arsal on 6 June, unknown militants returned to attack the LAF checkpoint previously attacked on 28 May. The attack was repelled by the Army troops, and two militants were killed.
- 10–11 June 2013: One man was killed on 10 June in Hermel when the pickup truck he was driving was fired on by unknown gunmen. The driver was transporting Syrian refugees between Hermel and Akkar. The next day, 10 rockets were fired from Syria into Hermel, killing one and wounding several others.
- 23–25 June 2013: Heavy street fighting erupted between the Lebanese Army and gunmen loyal to Salafist preacher Ahmed Al-Assir in Sidon. Overall, at least 50 people died during the fighting. 17–18 soldiers, 25–40 militants and four Hezbollah fighters were killed. Two civilians were killed, including a bodyguard of a cleric, who tried to reach the fighting to negotiate a ceasefire. 100–128 Lebanese soldiers, 60 pro-Assir militants, over 50 civilians and 15 Hezbollah fighters were wounded.
- 27 June 2013: 25 Syrians were traveling in a mini-bus through Beirut neighbourhood of Jisr Al-Wati when they were attacked by 8 men armed with knives who injured 20 of the Syrians.
- 9 July 2013: a car bomb exploded in south Beirut injured 53 people.
- 15 August 2013: A car bomb exploded in a part of Hezbollah controlled Beirut killing 27 and wounding 226.
- 22 August 2013: Gunmen opened fire on pro Hezbollah supporters killing three in Tripoli.
- 23 August 2013: Twin car bombs exploded in front of two Sunni mosques killing at least 47 and wounding over 500.
- 20–28 October 2013: 17 people were killed and 100 wounded during clashes in Tripoli.
- 24 October 2013: Two Syrian gunmen were killed by the Lebanese Army in the eastern Bekaa valley after they refused to halt their vehicle.
- 30 November–2 December 2013: 13 people were killed, including one soldier, and over 80 wounded, including 10 soldiers and one policeman, during clashes in Tripoli. Also, one person was killed and several were wounded in fighting in Lebanon's largest Palestinian refugee camp, Ain el Hilweh.
- 21 December 2013: 32 Syrian jihadists were killed after they were ambushed by Hezbollah in Wadi al-Jamala while infiltrating Lebanon from Syria.
- 27 December 2013: A car bomb exploded in the Beirut Central District killing at least five people, including the former Lebanese ambassador to the U.S. Mohamad Chatah, and wounding 71 others.

== 2014 ==
- 14–24 March 2014: 30 people were killed and 175 wounded.
- 16 March 2014: Four people, including two Hezbollah members, were killed and at least 14 were wounded by a suicide car bomb in the Bekaa Valley, near the Syrian border.
- 27 March 2014: A soldier was killed in Tripoli, while a militant was killed near the border with Syria.
- 29 March 2014: Three soldiers were killed and four wounded in a suicide bomb attack on their checkpoint near Arsal, on the Syrian border.
- 14 July 2014: 5 Hezbollah fighters and 30 Jihadist fighters were killed in clashes near Arsal.
- 20 July 2014: A terrorist suspect was killed in an Army raid in Tripoli.
- 2–7 August 2014: Battle of Arsal. A full-scale invasion of the town of Arsal by the Al-Nusra Front and the Islamic State involved the Lebanese Army in a major way for the first time. 60 militants, 19 soldiers and 42–50 civilians were killed. Another 135 civilians, 86 soldiers and 15 militants were wounded. The militants were eventually forced to withdraw back into Syria, but not before taking 44 soldiers and policemen hostage. Three of the hostages were later executed and 20 released.
- 27–30 August 2014: Fighting along the Syrian border spills into Lebanon again, with Syrian airstrikes and pitched battles in the Bekaa Valley, which also forced the Lebanese army to participate, one soldier was killed and another wounded.
- 21 September 2014: Three Hezbollah fighters were killed in a suicide attack on their checkpoint near the village of Khreibeh in the Bekaa Valley.
- 5–6 October 2014: Al-Nusra Front militants attacked Hezbollah positions outside the village of Brital in the Bekaa Valley. The subsequent fighting left 16 militants and eight Hezbollah fighters dead. 20 Hezbollah members were also wounded.
- 24–27 October 2014: 42 people were killed (23 jihadist militants, 11 soldiers and eight civilians) and 100 wounded in fighting in and near Tripoli.
- 27 October 2014: A wanted Islamist militant was killed at an Army checkpoint in the Bekaa Valley.
- 2 December 2014: Six soldiers were killed and one wounded in an ambush by unknown gunmen in the Tal Hamra area of Ras Baalbek, near the border with Syria.

== 2015 ==
- 10 January 2015: 2015 Jabal Mohsen suicide attacks: Nine people were killed by a suicide bomber at a cafe in an Alawite neighbourhood of Tripoli.
- 23 January 2015: At least 17 fighters killed and 22 wounded near Ras Baalbek after their outpost near the border was attacked by ISIS.
- 7 April 2015: 3 people were killed during clashes on Syrian border
- 25 July 2015: 1 Fatah colonel was killed in a refugee camp.
- 28 July 2015: 2 people were killed in clashes in a South Lebanon refugee camp.
- 17 August 2015: 2 people were killed at the border.
- 19 October 2015: 8 were killed in a blast in northeast near Syrian border.
- 5 November 2015: 6 people were killed in Arsal border town when it was rocked by a suicide bomb.
- 12 November 2015: 2015 Beirut bombings: 43 people were killed.

== 2016 ==
- 28 March–2 April 2016: 1 man was killed in a refugee camp in clashes between Islamists and Fatah in the Ain al-Hilweh camp.

== 2017 ==
- April 24: Lebanese Army raids on ISIS and Jabhat al-Nusra positions near the Syrian border inflicts 20 casualties.
