= Next Syrian presidential election =

- During or before December 2029
- Governorates of Syria
Incumbent President
Ahmed al-Sharaa
Independent

A presidential election in Syria is planned to take place within five years of the fall of the Assad regime in December 2024. Until then, Syria will be governed by a transitional government under the Constitutional Declaration during a five-year transitional period led by Syrian President Ahmed al-Sharaa.

== Background ==
In May 2021, Ba'athist Syria under Bashar al-Assad conducted its final presidential election, which he won by a landslide with over 95% of the popular vote. The election was widely dismissed internationally as an illegitimate sham election and was marked by substantial electoral fraud. It was held only in areas controlled by the Ba'athist Syrian government during the country's civil war. Assad was sworn in for his fourth term (2021–2028) on 17 July 2021 at the Presidential Palace. However, he did not complete his term, as his government collapsed on 8 December 2024 following renewed Syrian opposition offensives led by Hay'at Tahrir al-Sham (HTS) during the Syrian civil war.

Ahmed al-Sharaa subsequently became the country's de facto leader as the head of HTS. On 9 December, HTS released a video featuring al-Sharaa, then–Syrian Prime Minister Mohammad Ghazi al-JalalI, and Mohammed al-Bashir, the Prime Minister of the Syrian Salvation Government. On the same day, following the fall of the Assad regime, as the head of the de facto government in Idlib, al-Bashir was tasked with forming a transitional government after meeting with al-Sharaa and outgoing Prime Minister al-Jalali to coordinate the transfer of power. The next day, al-Bashir was officially appointed by the General Command of Syria as the prime minister of the caretaker government.

On 29 January 2025, during the Syrian Revolution Victory Conference, Hassan Abdul Ghani, the spokesman of the rebels' Military Operations Command, announced the appointment of al-Sharaa as the president of Syria. Abdul Ghani stated that al-Sharaa would govern the country during the transitional period, assume the duties of the president, and represent the nation on the international stage. In March 2025, al-Sharaa ratified a Constitutional Declaration for the transitional period, establishing Syria as a presidential republic without a prime minister, setting a five-year transition period, and announcing the formation of a transitional government.

== Date of the election ==
Shortly after the fall of the Assad regime, Hadi al-Bahra, president of the Syrian National Coalition, said that an 18-month transitional period was needed to establish "a safe, neutral, and quiet environment" for free elections, as outlined in the UNSC Resolution 2254. However, the newly declared president of Syria, Ahmed al-Sharaa, stated that elections would need at least four to five years to take place, citing the need to first re-establish the infrastructure for elections by holding a comprehensive population census and drafting a constitution, which he estimated "may take two or three years." In a meeting with al-Sharaa, French foreign minister Jean-Noël Barrot and German foreign minister Annalena Baerbock urged Syria's new leadership to avoid undue delays in holding elections.

Following his appointment as president in January 2025, Ahmed al-Sharaa said in February 2025, in an interview with Syria TV, that Syria's transitional period could last four to five years before elections could be held. He said that the country needed to establish the necessary infrastructure and consolidate population data to update electoral records, adding that elections held without accurate data could be subject to doubt. Al-Sharaa also said that Syria would follow international norms governing transitional periods, including those concerning the role of the president during the transition, and would ultimately move toward an elected presidency and elected government.

In a September 2025 interview with 60 Minutes, al-Sharaa said elections would be held once Syria's infrastructure and citizens' records are restored. He stated that he wants Syria to be a place where every person can vote. On 6 December 2025, at the Doha Forum, al-Sharaa told Christiane Amanpour, CNN’s Chief International Anchor, that the national dialogue conference held after the liberation had resulted in a temporary constitutional declaration granting him a five-year mandate to pass new laws and draft a new constitution ahead of elections scheduled in four years. On 17 September 2026, UN Deputy Special Envoy for Syria Claudio Cordone said that he had discussed preparations for future parliamentary and presidential elections with Syrian authorities, including potential UN electoral assistance. He also stressed that an inclusive, transparent and participatory process would be essential to the development of a new constitution.

== Candidates ==
=== Declared under certain conditions ===
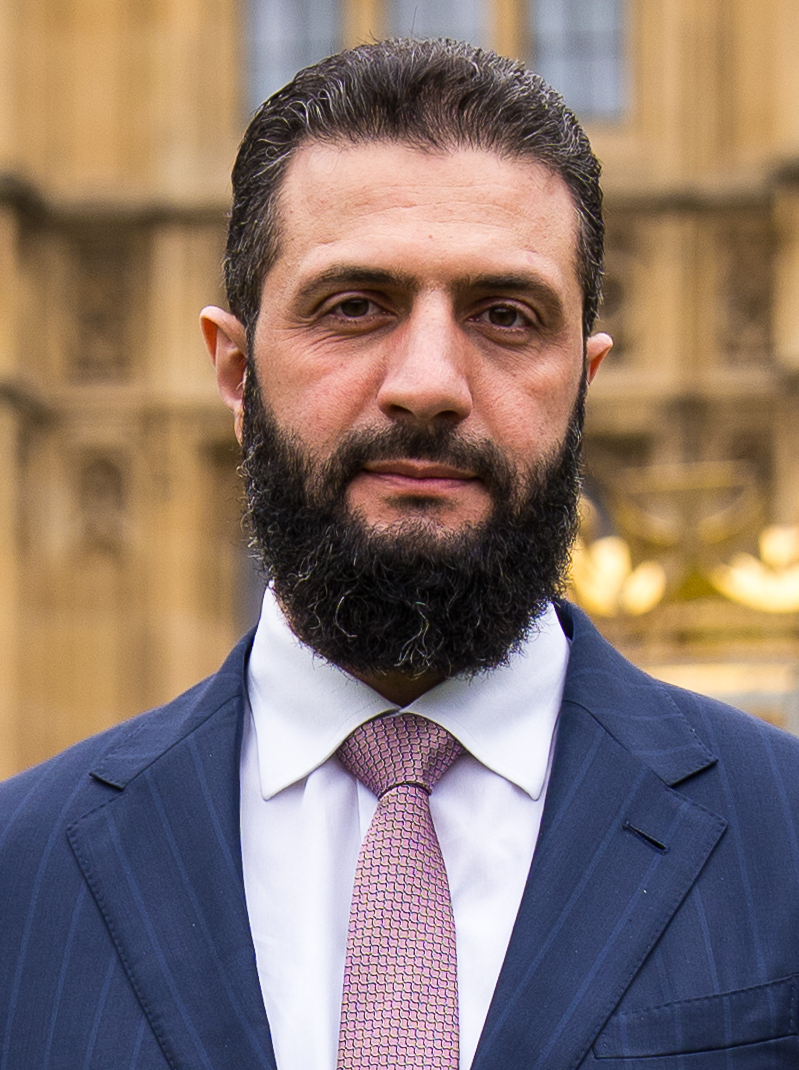
President of Syria
Ahmed al-Sharaa
(2025–present)

==== Ahmed al-Sharaa ====
Ahmed al-Sharaa has served as President of Syria since 2025. During the Syrian civil war, he was the emir of Hay'at Tahrir al-Sham (HTS) and the de facto leader of the Syrian Salvation Government (SSG). He led the decisive Syrian opposition offensives that resulted in the fall of the Assad regime in 2024 and subsequently served as Syria's de facto leader following the regime's collapse. He currently leads the Syrian transitional government under the Constitutional Declaration during its five-year transitional period.

In September 2026, during an Atlantic Council event held on the sidelines of the United Nations General Assembly, The National asked al-Sharaa whether he intended to seek re-election after the transitional period. Al-Sharaa said he had three years remaining in office and that his immediate priority was governing the country. He said, "I haven’t thought about being elected," adding, "Right now, we are focusing on serving people." However, he stated that he would consider seeking another term if he believed remaining in office was necessary to complete his work, saying, "I will nominate myself." Al-Sharaa also said that he would prefer to return to a normal life, describing governing as "really tiresome,” and added, "If I believe that I need to remain in power, I will stay there."
