= Zara'a, Hama =

Zara'a الزارة
- Village
- Location in Syria
- Coordinates: 34°55′12″N 36°39′34″E
- Country: Syria
- Governorate: Hama
- District: Hama
- Subdistrict: Hirbnafsah

Population (2004)
  - Total: 929
- Time zone: UTC+3 (AST)
- City Qrya Pcode: C3041

Zara'a (Arabic: الزارة also spelled Zara or Zarah) is a Syrian village located in the Hirbnafsah Subdistrict in Hama District. It is situated along the banks of the Orontes River. According to the Syria Central Bureau of Statistics (CBS), Zara'a had a population of 929 in the 2004 census. The village is mainly inhabited by Alawites. The Al-Nusra Front took control of the village on 12 May 2016. There were reports that Alawite families either fled or were killed. As of 10 February 2025, the village remained uninhabited.
