= Doha Forum =

Annual forum in Qatar

Doha Forum (DF) (Arabic: منتدى الدوحة) is a forum held annually since 2003 in Doha, the capital city of Qatar. It is aimed at promoting dialogue, bringing together leaders in policy making to discuss critical challenges facing the world, and to build innovative and action-driven networks. The 2025 edition of the forum was held between December 6th and December 8th

The Doha forum is sponsored by the state of Qatar under the banner "Diplomacy, Dialogue, Diversity", and since inception has seen the presence of several individuals from all over the globe. The 2003 forum, which happened to be the inaugural forum, saw more than 140 participants including ambassadors, congressmen and other dignitaries.

== Doha Forum 2025 ==
The Doha Forum 2025 was held between December 6th and December 8th in Doha, with a theme of "Justice in Action: Beyond Promises to Progress." The emphasis was on moving beyond conventional rhetoric to establish concrete stops to support sustainable prosperity and address injustice, particularly with reference to conflicts, health and education emergencies, and the widening divide between the Global North and Global South.

Some of the speakers at the forum included:

1. USA Bill Gates (Chair, Gates Foundation)
2. Qatar Her Highness Sheikha Moza bint Nasser (Chairperson of Qatar Foundation and Education Above All Foundation)
3. Qatar Sheikh Mohammed bin Abdulrahman bin Jassim Al Thani (Prime Minister, State of Qatar)
4. Syria H.E. Ahmed Hussein Al Sharaa (President, Syrian Arab Republic)
5. EU H.E. Kaja Kallas (High Representative for Foreign Affairs and Security Policy & Vice President, European Commission)
6. Ghana H.E. John Dramani Mahama (President, Republic of Ghana)
7. Lebanon H.E. Dr. Nawaf Salam (Prime Minister, Lebanese Republic)
8. UK Bronwen Maddox (Director and CEO, Chatham House)
9. USA H.E. Hillary Clinton (Former Secretary of State, United States of America)
10. USA Donald Trump Jr. (Partner, 1789 Capital)

== Previous forums ==
=== 2003 ===
The 2003 forum was held between the 14 and 15 April 2003 at The Ritz Carlton Hotel, Doha. It had more than 140 attendees from all over the world and it centred around issues bordering democracy and free trade as a general starting point from which stemmed several closely related topics.

Some of the participants included:

1. UN Dr Giandomenico Picco (personal representative of the Secretary General for United Nations Year of Dialogue among Civilizations)
2. Mr Frederic SICRE (World Economic Forum)
3. USA H.E. Patrick Theros (Former US Ambassador to Qatar)
4. Eritrea Dr Ahmed Hassan (Dehli Director General Strategic Studies Centre)
5. Bangladesh Mr Mahfus Anam

=== 2004 ===
The Conference was held on the 5 and 6 April 2004 in Doha and was inaugurated by the Highness Sheikh Hamad Bin Khalifa Al Thani, Emir of the State of Qatar in the presence of about (500) participants representing several official academic, research, information and cultural circles from all over the world.

Some of the participants included:

1. Oman Abdallah Baabood (Businessman)
2. Kuwait Abdallah Sahar (Professor in Foreign Relations)
3. Japan Akiko Yamanaka (The United Nations University)
4. France Alain Marleix (Deputy, National Assembly)
5. Italy Alessandra Paradisi (Head of Mediterranean Relations Radio Televisione Italiana (RAI)

=== 2005 ===
The conference was held between 29 and 30 March 2005 at the Ritz Carlton Hotel and was attended by more than 500 participants. It focused on global democracy and the role of women and internal reforms.

Some of the participants were:

1. England Dr Madawi Al Rasheed (King's College London)
2. USA Sheila Jackson (Member of US Congress)
3. UK Dr Gerd Nonneman (Lancaster University)
4. Russia H.E. Sergey Glaziev (Member of Russian Parliament)
5. Qatar Mr Wadah Khanfar (Director of Al-Jazeera Satellite Channel)

=== 2022 ===
The Doha Forum 2022, which held between 26 and 27 March 2022 at Sheraton Grand, Doha, Qatar under the theme "Transforming for the New Era" focused on Geopolitical Alliances and International Relations, Financial System and Economic Development, Defense, Cyber and Food Security and Climate Change and Sustainability.

Some of the speakers at the forum were:

1. Qatar H.H Sheikh Tamim Bin Hamad Al Thani
2. KSA H.H. Faisal Bin Farhan Al Saud (Minister of Foreign Affairs, Saudi Arabia)
3. USA H.E. John Kerry (United States Special Presidential Envoy for Climate and Former Secretary of State)
4. EU Josep Borrell (High Representative of the European Union for Foreign Affairs and Security Policy)
5. Ukraine Emine Dzhaparova (First Deputy Minister for Foreign Affairs, Ukraine)
