= Zara'a attack =

Attack during the Syrian civil war

- Part of the Syrian civil war
- Zara'a in the Hirbnafsah Nahiyah, Hama Governorate
- Location: Hama Governorate, Syria
- Date: 12 May 2016
- Target: Alawite civilians, National Defence Forces
- Attack type: Shooting
- Weapons: AK-47s and other small arms
- Deaths: 8-30 NDF militiamen killed at least 19 civilians killed Unknown number kidnapped
- Injuries: Unknown
- Perpetrators: Al-Nusra Front and Ahrar ash-Sham
- Motive: Sectarianism

On 12 May 2016, rebel militants of the al-Qaeda-linked al-Nusra Front and Ahrar ash-Sham attacked and captured the Alawite village of Zara'a, Southern Hama Governorate.

== Attack ==
In the early morning of 12 May 2016, rebels belonging to Ahrar al-Sham and the al-Nusra Front launched a surprise attack on the village of Zara'a, defeating a National Defence Forces unit stationed there, allowing the rebels to enter the predominantly Alawite village. According to the Syrian Observatory for Human Rights, eight pro-government militiamen were killed and several villagers were kidnapped, while the Local Coordination Committees of Syria claimed that thirty pro-government militiamen were killed. More clashes continued into the afternoon with the Syrian and Russian Air Forces conducting airstrikes on rebel positions. The Observatory also claimed that the attacks were in response to the ongoing battle for Aleppo.

== Aftermath ==
According to the pro-government outlet Al-Masdar News, the kidnapped civilians were taken to the al-Rastan plains. Some of the captured were NDF troops. On 24 May, the Syrian Red Crescent convinced the militants to hand over civilians and NDF bodies. They were transported by the Syrian Army to the Homs Military Hospital for identification the next day. On 27 May, the Syria Times claimed that twenty abductees from Zara'a had been freed.

== Reactions ==
Ba'athist Syria: Prime Minister Wael Nader al-Halqi said that the massacre was "a heinous crime against the whole world." He also mentioned that "the international community must stand by Syria in fighting terrorism and should take immediate steps to prevent the countries which support terrorism from supplying terrorists with arms and money, on top Qatar, Saudi Arabia and Turkey."

The Syrian Foreign Ministry also sent two letters where they called on the UN Secretary-General and the UN Security Council to condemn the massacre.

France: French MP and president of the France-Syria Friendship Group in the National Assembly, Gérard Bapt condemned the murder of Alawite families in Zara'a. He added that "the recent initiative to officially add Ahrar ash-Sham and Jaysh al-Islam to the list of terrorist organizations was not supported by the UN Security Council due to the fact that five Western countries have disagreed." He further said "[We] must take the appropriate measures in Riyadh and within the framework of the High Negotiation Committee in Vienna to ensure the immediate liberation of civilians who were taken hostage."

== See also ==
- 2025 massacres of Syrian Alawites
- List of massacres during the Syrian Civil War
