= 2015 Tripoli, Lebanon bombings =

Terrorist incident in Lebanon

- Part of Syrian Civil War spillover in Lebanon
- Location: Jabal Mohsen, Tripoli, Lebanon
- Date: 10 January 2015
- Target: Alawite civilians
- Attack type: Suicide bombings
- Deaths: 9
- Injuries: More than 30
- Perpetrator: Nusra Front

On 10 January 2015, nine people were killed and more than 30 wounded when two suicide bombers blew themselves up in a crowded café in Jabal Mohsen, Tripoli, Lebanon.

== Events ==
After the first explosion, the second suicide bomber approached the Abu Imran café. Before he could blow himself up, 60-year-old father of seven "Abu Ali" Issa Khaddour rushed and tackled the bomber, and prevented many deaths. The wounded were taken to the hospital in Zgharta, as Jabal Mohsen residents were afraid that Sunni Islamist mobs would kill Alawite wounded if taken to a hospital in Tripoli. The dead were buried on January 12.

The al-Qaeda affiliated terrorist group Nusra Front took responsibility for the attacks, which targeted members of the Alawite sect. It was the first suicide attack on a civilian neighbourhood in nearly a year, following a security sweep that temporarily calmed the Bab al-Tabbaneh–Jabal Mohsen conflict between Sunnis and Alawites of Tripoli. Nusra claimed the attack was in revenge for the Syrian government's attacks on Sunnis in the Syrian civil war, and for a bombing of Sunni mosques that was blamed on Alawites. The interior minister of Lebanon, Nohad Machnouk, said on January 11 that the attack was carried out by the Islamic State of Iraq and the Levant.

== Reaction ==
The US strongly condemned the attack. On January 11, the Qalamoun branch of the Nusra Front threatened to conduct more attacks against Jabal Mohsen and Hezbollah. On 10 April 2015, one of the men implicated in the bombings was killed by Lebanese security forces.

A suicide bombing was also supposed to have taken place in another Jabal Mohsen café simultaneously with the 2015 Beirut bombings on November 12, but the supposed bomber was detained.
