= Idlib demilitarization (2018–2019) =

Multinational military agreement

Coordinates: 34.5600°N 38.2672°E

- Part of the Turkish military operation in Idlib Governorate and the Russian intervention in the Syrian civil war
- The situation in the province of Idlib as of 17 September 2018. Locations of Turkish outposts are pictured. Syrian Army control Tahrir al-Sham and allies control National Front for Liberation and allies control Turkish-backed Free Syrian Army control
Date	17 September 2018 – 30 April 2019 (7 months, 1 week and 6 days); 31 August – 19 December 2019 (3 months, 2 weeks and 5 days)
Location	Northwestern Syria: Northeastern Latakia Governorate; Northwestern Hama Governorate; Southern Idlib Governorate; Western Aleppo Governorate
Result	Failed^{[a]}

Belligerents
(Syria) Syrian Arab Republic; Russia; Iran; Liwa al-Quds; Hezbollah; Arab Nationalist Guard; SSNP; Ba'ath Brigades	(Syrian opposition) Syrian Interim Government (Syrian opposition) Syrian National Army; National Front for Liberation; Turkey; Jaysh al-Izza Syrian Salvation Government; Hay'at Tahrir al-Sham; Turkistan Islamic Party; Ajnad al-Kavkaz; Rouse the Believers Operations Room; Katibat al-Ghuraba al-Turkistan; Junud al-Sham; Caucasus Emirate; Tarkhan's Jamaat; Jama'at Ansar al-Furqan in Bilad al Sham; Abu Amara Special Task Battalion

Commanders and leaders
Vladimir Putin (President of Russia); Gen. Mohammad Khaddour; Maj. Gen. Suheil al-Hassan	Recep Tayyip Erdogan (President of Turkey) (Syrian opposition) Mohammad Safwan al Saleh † (Syrian opposition) Col. Mustafa Bakour Abu Mohammad al-Julani (HTS general commander); Abu Maria al-Qahtani; Abu al-Fath al-Ferghali; Abu Yaqdhan al-Masri; Asaad al-Shaibani

Units involved
Syrian Armed Forces: 3rd Armoured Division; Qalamoun Shield Forces; Republican Guard; 124th Brigade; 4th Armoured Division; 18th Armoured Division; 131st Armored Brigade; Tiger Forces; Air Force Intelligence Directorate; National Defence Forces; Syrian Air Force; SSNP: Eagles of the Whirlwind; Russian Armed Forces and affiliated paramilitaries: Aerospace Forces; Wagner Group; (Iran) IRGC: Quds Force	(Syrian opposition) National Front for Liberation: Syrian Liberation Front; Ahrar al-Sham; Nour al-Din al-Zenki Movement; Sheikh Fadel al-Akel; Katibat al-Bayia Lillah; Katibat Usud al-Tawheed; Liwa al-Adiyat; Martyr Abu Omar Battalion; Jaysh al-Ahrar; Suqour al-Sham Brigades; Sham Legion; Free Idlib Army; Army of Victory; Elite Army; 1st Coastal Division; 23rd Division; Islamic Freedom Brigade; 2nd Coastal Division; 1st Infantry Division; Hay'at Tahrir al-Sham: Jaish al-Muhajireen wal-Ansar; (Afghanistan) Imam Bukhari Jamaat; Jaysh al-Usra; Movement of Mujahideen of the Sunnis of Iran; Army of Umar Ibn Khattab; Army of Abu Bakr as-Sadiq; Army of Uthman ibn Affan; Rouse the Believers Operations Room: Alliance to Support Islam; Guardians of Religion Organization; Ansar al-Tawhid; Ansar al-Din Front - Harakat Fajr ash-Sham al-Islamiya; Ansar al-Islam

Casualties and losses
(Syria) 238 killed (as of 29 April 2019); 2 killed	155 rebels killed (gov.-rebel conflict; as of 29 April 2019); 130 rebels killed (HTS-NLF conflict); 1 killed
- 372 civilians killed (as of 29 April 2019); 80,000 people displaced
- ^{a} Buffer zone never fully implemented, interrupted by intermittent shelling and ground offensives. Zone considered to be inactive by Turkey, which Russia says did not abide by the agreement, while Russia considers Turkey to have failed to separate moderate rebels from hardline jihadists.

The Idlib demilitarization was an agreement between Turkey and Russia to create a demilitarized zone (DMZ) in Syria's rebel-held Idlib Governorate, to be patrolled by military forces from Russia and Turkey. On 17 September 2018, the Russian president Vladimir Putin and Turkish president Recep Tayyip Erdoğan, reached an agreement to create a buffer zone in Idlib.

== Background ==
In the start of 2018, after ISIL defeat in eastern Syria, the Syrian government and its allies intensified their assault on rebels in the southwest. After the Beit Jinn offensive in January, the Eastern Qalamoun offensive (April 2018), rebel fighters who refused to "reconcile" with the government were evacuated to Idlib – reportedly about 1,500 from Qalamoun and 300 from Beit Jinn to Idlib and Daraa in December and more in March. At the same time, rebel and HTS fighters surrendered in the long Rif Dimashq Governorate campaign, and the rebels, numbering about 20,000, were transported to Idlib, Afrin and Al-Bab area. In late July 2018, Syrian government forces and their allies captured the Southern Front, during the 2018 Southern Syria offensive. Rebel fighters who refused to reconcile were again transported to Idlib.

After that, the Syrian government started gathering troops outside of Idlib, and began shelling rebel-held territories at the start of August. Rebels started building defenses and trenches for an upcoming offensive.

== The bombardments ==
On 4 September 2018, at least ten Russian Sukhoi aircraft launched dozens of air strikes over the southern and western part of the Idlib Governorate, which led to the largest bombing campaign in the province. Russian air strikes specifically targeted the Jisr al-Shughur District, including Al-Shughour, Mahambel, Basnkoul, Zaizooun, Ziyarah, Jadariiah, Kafrdeen, Al-Sahn, Saraseef and a dozen others. The Russian air force on the first day recorded more than 50-70 attacks. According to pro-government sources, at least 11 civilians were killed, and 24 wounded during the strikes. The following day, one of the top Syrian Arab Army (SAA) commanders arrived in northern Syria in the upcoming offensive in Idlib, Hama and Latakia: according to the official media wing of the Tigers, their commander, Major-General Suheil al-Hassan, went to Aleppo area to visit the areas retaken by the government. The Syrian and Russian air forces resumed their airstrikes over the southwestern countryside of the Idlib Governorate today. Using their Sukhoi jets, the Syrian and Russian air forces heavily bombarded the Jisr Al-Shughour District for the second straight day. As the bombardments continued, and the fears for an upcoming offensive appeared to become a reality, the United Nations issued a warning that the offensive will result in a bloodbath and a massacre, as about 100,000 rebels and 3,000,000 civilians were holed up in the area. Turkey started sending more troops and boosting defenses in the frontlines, and warned the government and Russia of a humanitarian disaster if their forces started the offensive, saying it would create a new wave of refugees. On 13 September, it was announced Russian President Vladimir Putin would meet Turkish President Recep Tayyip Erdogan in Iran, to discuss ways forward.

== Terms ==
The demilitarization deal was struck on 16 September and was announced as binding on both parties. The terms were as follows:

- A demilitarized zone (DMZ) would be set up entirely within rebel-held territory. It would be 15 to 25 km deep (9–15 miles) and come into effect by 15 October. All acts of aggression would be prohibited within the zone.
- The Syrian Government would refrain from attacks on the rebel-held Idlib Governorate.
- Groups deemed "radical", such as the Al-Qaeda-linked Hay'at Tahrir al-Sham (HTS), would have to leave the demilitarized zone entirely.
- Groups deemed "moderate", such as the Turkish-backed National Front for Liberation, would be allowed to remain within the demilitarized zone, but would have to withdraw all heavy and medium weapons from it, including all tanks, MLRS, artillery and mortars.
- The HTS-run Syrian Salvation Government would be dissolved.
- The rebel groups would open and ensure unrestricted civilian access through the M4 and M5 highways.
- Turkey would use its network of observation posts in Idlib to secure the rebel-held DMZ, while Russia and Iran would likewise set up and use their own military observation posts to secure the government-controlled territories, which border the zone.
- Turkey and Russia would coordinate joint patrols along the DMZ, in order to ensure compliance.
- Russia and Turkey would reiterate their "determination to combat terrorism in Syria in all forms and manifestations".

The pro-government Al-Watan newspaper further reported that the agreement would reportedly end in the return of government institutions to Idlib, after rebel groups withdraw from residential areas.

The Turkistan Islamic Party, Guardians of Religion Organization, Ansar al-Tawhid, Ansar al-Din Front, and Ansar al-Islam rejected the deal, putting the agreement in jeopardy, while Hay'at Tahrir al-Sham issued an ambiguous statement on the deal.

The Syrian Government accepted and "welcomed" the deal.

== Incidents after the deal ==
On 19 September, the Syrian military attacked positions held by HTS and its allies, in the Hama-Latakia-Idlib axis, stating that it has still not withdrawn its troops from the area.

On 20 September, Hay'at Tahrir al-Sham reportedly executed an individual who was reportedly supportive of reconciliation with the Syrian Government.

Turkish officials and officials from Hay'at Tahrir al-Sham (HTS) since the inception of the deal have been discussing a course of action to be taken in Idlib in line with the deal's guidelines. Reportedly the most urgent topic of the discussions is the uncertain fate of foreign fighters within HTS, with HTS proposing that the group dissolves and become part of an umbrella of other groups, while foreign fighters along with the group's leader Abu Mohammad al-Julani be allowed safety, discussions have been inconclusive in this regard but satisfactory in other aspects with many elements of HTS welcoming much of the Sochi agreement.

While pro-government forces reportedly attacked opposition forces positioned in Turkmen Mountain in the Latakia Governorate which is reportedly a part of the agreed demilitarized zone, which caused several fires in the area, the government also targeted other areas of the Latakia Mountains including Jabal Al-Akrad and Kabani. Government targeting also hit areas in the Idlib Governorate including the Qoqfeen area in the western countryside of the province. The areas in the Hama Governorate were also reportedly hit including the town of al-Sermaniyyeh in the al-Ghab plain, opposition factions responded by shelling government-held areas in the northern countryside of the Hama governorate in the towns of Joureen and Foro. Later at night on the same day multiple rebels including the Nour al-Din al-Zenki Movement reportedly shelled Pro-Government positions in the western parts of Aleppo targeting the Mokambo and Al-Andalus districts of the city. In response to the attack the Syrian military fired missiles into the Rashideen 4 area held by the Syrian opposition.

On 1 October, machine gun fire was reportedly emanating from pro-government forces in the rebel-held Lirmoun area of the northwestern outskirts of Aleppo, along with continued shelling on behalf of pro-government forces after shelling from the previous night.

On 2 October, Hay'at Tahrir al-Sham (HTS) and Turkish officials reportedly reached an agreement where agrees to withdraw fighters and heavy weapons from the established demilitarized zone, as well as a dissolution of the Syrian Salvation Government and its administration became integrated with the Syrian Interim Government and that HTS restructures so it will no longer be designated a terrorist organization by Turkey, and Turkey in turn agrees not to take action against the group and its members and leadership will be given safety.

On 26 October, pro-government shelling in the Idlib Governorate killed seven, reportedly being the largest loss of life since August 2018.

On 16 February, SOHR reported that at least 18 people were killed and many more injured after sporadic Syrian government shelling on Maarrat al-Nu'man, Khan Shaykhun, Hama and surrounding settlements in the rebel-held Idlib region within the past two days. Rebels responded with machine gun and rocket fire towards SAA positions.

=== Failure of the deal ===
The deal's terms were never implemented fully. Hay'at Tahrir al-Sham (HTS) never left the demilitarized zone and, to the contrary, launched a full-scale offensive against the other rebel groups remaining within the rebel-held Idlib Governorate. After 10 days of fighting, the National Front for Liberation (at that point the second largest and most powerful rebel group in Idlib, after HTS) signed a peace deal with the group, which allowed HTS to take over almost the entirety of the Idlib governorate, leaving only small and minor pockets under the control of the other rebel groups. The HTS-run Syrian Salvation Government was not dissolved but instead expanded its control to all of the areas recently captured by HTS, including those within the demilitarized zone. The presence of HTS forces along the demarcation line led to frequent exchanges of artillery shelling with government forces, which significantly undermined any chances for a true cesassion of violence. The M4 and M5 highways were never reopened by rebel forces and even the groups deemed 'moderate' by the deal never withdrew all heavy and medium weapons from the demilitarized zone. The provision for joint Turkish-Russian patrols within the DMZ was also not enforced, as the rebel groups categorically refused the entry of any Russian soldiers or military police to their controlled areas, allowing only Turkish forces to do so. The rebel's refusal reportedly came after Turkey reportedly 'promised' them that it would not allow any Russian presence within the DMZ. The deadline for the fulfilment of the deal's conditions was extended multiple times to allow Turkey more time to convince the rebel groups to adhere to the terms, but all such attempts were unsuccessful.

=== Renewed fighting ===
On 6 May, after six continuous days of intensive airstrikes on the region by the SyAAF and RuAF, the Syrian Arab Army launched a ground offensive against HTS and NFL-held areas in northern Hama and southern Idlib. The Syrian Government stated that the assault was provoked by increased rebel attacks on government-held areas originating from within the demilitarized zone. The Russian government stated that the deal was not implemented by the rebel groups, hence justifying military action against them. The Idlib-based rebel groups stated that the goal of the offensive would be to capture the M4 and M5 highways in the Idlib Governorate.

=== Attempted revival of the deal ===
On 1 August 2019, following several months of intense fighting between government and rebel forces, the Syrian Government announced a unilateral truce, conditional on rebels' fulfilment of the original 2018 demilitarisation terms. Most rebel groups reportedly accepted the offer. Shortly after the truce went into effect, however, Hay'at Tahrir al-Sham declared that they would categorically refuse to leave any region under their control at that time, which was a core demand of both the original agreement and the conditional ceasefire. A day later, the government announced the end of the ceasefire and a resumption of military operations, citing the refusal of rebel groups to withdraw from the zone as the reason for the truce's failure. A considerable portion of the DMZ's territory was subsequently captured by the Syrian Army and its allies during the final stages of the offensive. Another ceasefire was announced in late August, which confirmed the government gains. Some rebel groups on the other hand, expressed their refusal to adhere to the deal and withdraw from the remaining 'demilitarized' areas, hence signaling that the agreement would not be revived.

The subsequent 2019-2020 Northwestern Syria offensive saw large parts of the originally designated zone being captured by the Syrian Army. In mid February 2020 the Syrian Army regained control of the M5 Motorway.

On 5 March 2020, Russia and Turkey came to a new cease-fire agreement, which included joint Russian and Turkish patrols of a 12 kilometres (7.5 mi) wide corridor alongside the M4 Motorway that runs through Idlib to Latakia.

== Conflict parties ==
A number of pro-rebel and pro-Turkey demonstrations were held in rebel-controlled towns in the Idlib, Hama, and Aleppo governorates during the attempted implementation of the ceasefire, including the ones shown here on 22 September 2018.

A number of different, rivalrous rebel and jihadist factions control territory in Idlib Governorate, with fighters numbering up to 70,000. They are loosely organised into two rival coalitions, who had fought against each other in the January–March and July 2017.

=== HTS and allies ===
- Hay'at Tahrir al-Sham (HTS): one of the most powerful militant groups in Syria. It controls up to two-thirds of Idlib Governorate, including Idlib City and the Bab al-Hawa border crossing with Turkey. It was previously affiliated with Al-Qaeda, and is often said (including by the US State Department) to remain an al-Qaeda affiliate, despite the group's statement that since 2016 it does not belong to any "external entity". The group's leader, Abu Mohammad al-Julani, stated after the rebel defeats in the south that the same thing will not happen in Idlib, implying that his coalition will fight if the regime raided Idlib. The UN estimates it and its allies to have 10,000 fighters, with a high number of foreigners. Other estimates put it at 8,000, about 10,000, to 12–14,000 fighters or even 30,000.
- Turkistan Islamic Party in Syria: an ethnic Uyghur jihadist group that came to Idlib from China during the revolution, and is close to HTS. They reportedly rejected the agreement. According to the Syrian government, the group has as many as 10,000 armed fighters, although Western analysts say the number is considerably lower, and the German government estimates 1,500. According to some commentators, many of its leaders are "double-agents", meaning that although the group as a whole is not a part of Al-Qaeda, its leaders are high ranking al-Qaeda members.
- Alliance to Support Islam: the group is another branch of Al-Qaeda in Syria, formed by Huras al-Din (whose fighting force is estimated by the German government at 1,000), and Ansar al-Tawhid, strong loyalists to Ayman al-Zawahiri, who rejected Joulani as their leader and the HTS project. It is led by Abu Humam al-Shami. It is thought that the group has about 2,000-3,000 active fighters.
- Katibat Jabal al-Islam: a Turkmen group, allied to HTS.
- Ajnad al-Kavkaz: a group made up from people from the Caucasus countries, that it came to Syria to fight the Russian government and the Assad regime, closely allied with HTS and other rebel groups. It has about 200 fighters.
- Jama'at Ansar al-Furqan in Bilad al Sham: another Al-Qaeda branch is Syria, thought to be led by Abu Julaib, a veteran Qaeda commander. VOA news states that the group may even be led by Hamza bin Laden. Not many things are heard about the group, and it may have merged with Hurras al-Din.
- Junud al-Sham: a very small group, made primarily of Chechens.

=== NFL coalition ===
The National Front for Liberation (NFL): not a single group, but a coalition, formed in 2018, mainly from two big groups. The first identifies as part of the more moderate Free Syrian Army; the second, which joined in August, is another, more radical, coalition, the Syrian Liberation Front (made up primarily of Ahrar al-Sham and the Nour al-Din al-Zenki Movement). The coalition controls territory in rural southern Idlib, rural western Aleppo and some settlements around Idlib City, according to the Turkish government linked Center for Middle Eastern Strategic Studies, and is thought to boast 30,000 to 55–60,000 rebels, or even up to 70,000. The coalition is heavily supported by Turkey. The groups that made the coalition are:

- Free Idlib Army: an FSA group, it commands about 6,000 fighters.
- 1st Coastal Division: an FSA group. Close allies of the group, who are also part of FSA, 2nd Army, 2nd Coastal Division, 1st Infantry Division, and Islamic Freedom Brigade, also joined the coalition.
- 23rd Division: another smaller FSA group, who joined the coalition.
- Elite Army: another FSA group, whom a part of it, is also part of Turkish-backed Free Syrian Army.
- Jaysh al-Nasr: another FSA group. It has about 5,000 fighters in its ranks.
- Syrian Liberation Front: one of the biggest forces in Idlib, it has about 25,000-27,000 fighters. It is essentially an alliance of Ahrar al-Sham and the Nour al-Din al-Zenki Movement, two hardline Sunni Islamist groups and the two largest rebel groups in northwestern Syria behind their main rival, Hay'at Tahrir al-Sham.
- Sham Legion: an alliance of rebel Islamist groups, it is also an ally of HTS. The group has about 8,500-10,000 fighters. It has rejected the deal.

== Reactions ==
=== Supranational ===
- United Nations − the United Nations praised the deal, hoping that it will be the start of a political solution in Syria.

=== National ===
- Iran − Iran's foreign minister Mohammad Javad Zarif in response to the deal tweeted, "Diplomacy Works", while adding that visits to Turkey and Russia in recent weeks pursued the deal to avert an offensive or campaign in Idlib "with a firm commitment to fight extremist terror." Bahram Ghasemi Iran's Foreign Ministry spokesmen said in regards to the agreement, "it is an important and essential step for removing the remaining terrorists in Syria."
- Turkey − Turkish foreign minister Mevlüt Çavuşoğlu in response to strong opposition to aspects of the agreement by groups such as Hay'at Tahrir al-Sham, that Turkish and Russian drones would patrol the demilitarized zone, while also saying, "The moderate opposition will stay in its place, a thing of much importance. A ceasefire will be conducted, the area will not be attacked, and accordingly there would not be provocations against other areas."
- United States − President Donald Trump wrote on Twitter warning that a large humanitarian crisis could happen in a post saying, "President Bashar al-Assad of Syria must not recklessly attack Idlib Province. The Russians and Iranians would be making a grave humanitarian mistake to take part in this potential human tragedy. Hundreds of thousands of people could be killed. Don't let that happen!" He also said in another occasion it would make the United States "Very, very, Angry". On 26 September, President Donald Trump said to the United Nations Security Council "the Syrian regime's butchery is enabled by Russia and Iran" and he added "I want to thank Iran, Russia and Syria for --at my very strong urgent and request-- substantially slowing down their attack on Idlib province and three million people who live there in order to get 35,000 targeted terrorists. Get the terrorists but I hope the restraint continues. The world is watching," while also thanking Turkey by saying, "Thank you also to Turkey for helping to negotiate restraint. Anything the U.S.A. can do to help resolve this problem in order to save perhaps even hundreds of thousands of lives, maybe more, we are willing and able. We are available to help."

=== Domestic ===
- (Democratic Autonomous Administration of North and East Syria) Democratic Federation of Northern Syria − Former president of DFNS Salih Muslim said that Turkey and Russia are plotting to send a Jihadist army from Idlib to Afrin for future attacks against Kurds in Syria.
- Syrian Arab Republic − The Syrian government welcomed the agreement; however, officials still vowed to the press to retake "every inch of Syria". The Syrian ambassador to Lebanon also said this would be a test of Turkey's ability to keep its promises.
- Syrian Opposition − Mustafa Sejari, a Free Syrian Army official told journalists, "The Idlib deal preserves lives of civilians and their direct targeting by the regime. It buries Assad's dreams of imposing his full control over Syria." He added, "This area will remain in the hands of the Free Syrian Army and will force the regime and its supporters to start a serious political process that leads to a real transition that ends Assad's rule." Mahmoud Abbi the spokesman for the Turkish funded Free Idlib Police told the Guardian "Civilians in Idlib think this is a good deal, they feel hopeful and happy concerning it, We are grateful for Turkey's efforts to prevent the Russian and Assad attack on Idlib. However ... we do not trust Russia about the deal. But for now it is better than displacement or bombing. The deal is for Turkey's security but it is also face-saving for Putin and by association Assad, Iran refused to participate in this attack because of its own bad military and economic situation. The Assad regime is weak and has no ability to attack without the help of Iranian militias."
- Hay'at Tahrir al-Sham − rejected the conditions of the deal on 19 September. Several high ranking leaders, including scholars in Hay'at Tahrir al-Sham, expressed their dissatisfaction with the terms through outlets such as Telegram channels. Abu al-Fath al-Ferghali, a scholar in Hay'at Tahrir al-Sham on Telegram, wrote on 19 September, "that who demands surrendering his weapon, whom ever he is, is undoubtedly an enemy, for giving up on this weapon is treason to religion, upholding the word of Allah and the blood of martyrs which has been scarified to get it." While adding, "There is no worry about surrendering what is more important than arms, which is the areas liberated by the blood of the honest people. [. . .] The matter of concern is that the human and jinn would act as to disperse the lines of Mujahideen, inspiring doubt among them and justifying submission." Asaad al-Shaibani, another HTS official, posted on Telegram, "Our weaponry is our pride and honor, as well as the safety valve to this blessed jihad; it is rather the only guarantee to the realization of the revolution's aims of attaining dignity and freedom, for our enemy knows no other language but force." No official stance was held by HTS until 14 October when Hay'at Tahrir al-Sham published an official statement on the agreement entitled "The Revolution will not die", the statement detailed the group's stance as after a period of consultation it accepts the deal but the group will not abandon Jihad nor will they hand over weapons and it thanked individuals who had supported the group financially.
- Jaysh al-Izza − On 20 September, Jamil al-Saleh the leader of the group, posted on Twitter though initially opposing the agreement, "All the thanks to our Turkish brothers who prevented warplanes and bombers from targeting our civilian people and all the shame and disgrace to those who left the Syrian people in the middle of the road and disappointed women and children," The group is also considered a key ally to Hay'at Tahrir al-Sham as well as a major Free Syrian Army faction. Later, on 29 October, the group went back to rejecting the deal, after it was announced that the zone will only include the areas of opposition control, and published a statement demanding an equally divided zone. The group also rejected the presence of Russian forces in rebel-held areas, and opposed the opening of highways until the Syrian government releases detainees.
- Ansar al-Din Front – On 23 September, the group published a statement condemning the Sochi Agreement, stating it was an extension of the "disastrous" Astana Agreement, as well as saying the agreement was a destruction of the Revolution.
- Guardians of Religion Organization – On 22 September, a statement was published by the group titled "About the Recent Sochi Agreement (Dayton #2): We Did Not Strive To Remove The Tyrant To Replace With Another Tyrant". The statement said the most evil of forces have gathered together to destroy the Jihad in Syria, which is in a fragile state as it is and the agreement is part of the plot to destroy the goals of Jihad in Syria. The statement also said that these forces won their roles and share their influence and control.
- Turkistan Islamic Party in Syria, Jama'at Ansar al-Furqan in Bilad al Sham, and Ajnad al-Kavkaz have also all rejected the deal.

=== Other ===
- Hezbollah − Hassan Nasrallah, the general-secretary of Hezbollah, said in a televised speech on the occasion of Ashura, "We can assume, following this deal, that Syria is going to a calm phase but we will be staying in the country based on an agreement with the Syrian government."

== See also ==
- Operation Euphrates Shield
- Turkish military operation in Idlib Governorate
- Operation Olive Branch
- Second Northern Syria Buffer Zone, another Syrian buffer zone arranged by Turkey and Russia
