= Fadlallah al-Haji =

Syrian rebel leader

- فضل الله الحجي
- Born: Kafr Yahmoul, Idlib Governorate, Syria
- Military career
- Allegiance: Ba'athist Syria (until 2012); Syrian Interim Government (2013–2025); Syria (2025–present)
- Branch: Syrian National Army (2017–2025): National Front for Liberation (2018–2025)
- Service years: 1995 – 2012; 2012–present
- Rank: Colonel (?–2019); Brigadier general (2019–present)
- Unit: Sham Legion (2014–2025)
- Conflicts: Syrian Civil War; Idlib Governorate clashes (June 2012–April 2013); 2014 Idlib offensive; 2014 Latakia offensive; Siege of Wadi Deif (2014); 2014 Hama offensive; 2015 Idlib offensive; Battle of Idlib (2015); Siege of al-Fu'ah and Kafriya; Northwestern Syria offensive (April–June 2015); Northwestern Syria offensive (October–November 2015); 2015–16 Latakia offensive; 2015 Hama offensive; 2016 Hama offensive; Idlib Governorate clashes (January–March 2017); Northwestern Syria campaign (October 2017–February 2018); Operation Olive Branch; National Front for Liberation–Tahrir al-Sham conflict; Northwestern Syria offensive (April–August 2019); Northwestern Syria offensive (December 2019–March 2020); 2024 Syrian opposition offensives; Operation Dawn of Freedom

Fadlallah al-Haji (Arabic: فَضْلَ اللَّه الْحَجِي, romanized: Faḍlallāh al-Ḥajī) is a Syrian military officer and former rebel leader, close to Turkey and allied with the Muslim Brotherhood. Considered a "scrupulous military man" by other Syrian rebel leaders and a "Turkish protégé", al-Haji led the Sham Legion from its formation in 2014 until it was absorbed into the new Syrian security apparatus. He was appointed chief of staff of the Syrian Interim Government's General Staff of its Ministry of Defence in 2017, and has been the commander-in-chief of the National Front for Liberation since its formation in 2018. The NFL merged with the Syrian National Army in October 2019, and al-Haji was appointed a deputy chief of staff of the SNA, continuing to preside over the NFL, which will restructure into four legions. After the victory of the Syrian Revolution, he became a senior instructor in the Ministry of Defense.

== Biography ==
Little is known about al-Haji's background; his photos were completely absent from the media and social networking sites until his public appearance in a press announcement in Urfa, southern Turkey, on 4 October 2019 that saw the National Front for Liberation merge with the Syrian National Army. The Sham Legion is also known for keeping lists of its commanders, including dozens of defected military officers, secretive.

Fadlallah al-Haji was born in the village of Kafr Yahmoul in the northern Idlib countryside in northwestern Syria. He joined the Syrian Armed Forces and attained the rank of Major. In late 2012, during the escalation of the Syrian Civil War, he defected to the Free Syrian Army and joined the Shield of the Revolution Brigade as the group's deputy commander, serving under Colonel Mustafa Abdul Karim. The Shield of the Revolution Brigade was part of the Muslim Brotherhood-affiliated Shields of the Revolution Council, which became the Sham Legion in March 2014, with al-Haji serving as a commander of the Legion.

On 15 March 2020, Step News Agency reported that Fadlallah al-Haji had resigned from his position on the orders of the Turkish government. The move came after the discovery of a large-scale embezzlement involving the Sham Legion and other groups within the NFL who misrepresented the number of fighters within their ranks in order to receive extra salaries from their Turkish ally. Turkey requested the NFL to prepare between 2,000 and 3,000 fighters to prepare for a Turkish Armed Forces-led military offensive against the Syrian Armed Forces in the western Aleppo Governorate in the event of the Russia–Turkey ceasefire breaking down, but the NFL only equipped 350 fighters after submitting 14,000 fake names to Turkey. However, Enab Baladi contacted Captain Naji Mustafa, who denied that al-Haji had resigned, and al-Haji continues to serve as the commander-in-chief of the NFL.

In February 2025, al-Haji was appointed director of the Higher Military Academy at the Syrian Ministry of Defence.
