= Saladin Brigade =

Saladin Brigade may refer to:

- Al-Nasser Salah al-Deen Brigades
- Saladin Ayubi Brigade
- Descendants of Saladin Brigade
