= Munther Saras =

Syrian politician

- منذر سراس - أبو عبادة

Member of the People's Assembly
- Incumbent
- Assumed office 1 July 2026
- Appointed by: Ahmed al-Sharaa

Personal details
- Born: 1963 (age 62–63) Homs, Syria

Munther Saras (Arabic: منذر سراس - أبو عبادة; born ?) is a Syrian politician and ex rebel commander who has served as member of the People's Assembly since July 2026.

== Career ==
Munther Saras, known as "Mondher Saras" or "Abu Abada", worked as a businessman and investor in Saudi Arabia born in Homs in 1963.

He was one of the founders of the Faylaq al-Sham on March 10, 2014, and became its commander-in-chief. He joined the Syrian National Coalition as a representative of the Faylaq al-Sham in September 2017. Subsequently, he became a representative of the National Front for Liberation in March 2021.

He was part of the Syrian opposition delegation participating in the first round of the Astana Conference in December 2017; he was later selected as chair of the political committee of the delegation participating in several subsequent rounds, and was then elected a member of the National Coalition’s Political Bureau on July 12, 2021.

Following the release of the Syrian presidential list, he became a member of the People's Assembly.
