= National Front for Liberation–Tahrir al-Sham conflict =

2019 conflict in Syria

- Part of Idlib demilitarization and the inter-rebel conflict and Russian military intervention in the Syrian Civil War
- Situation in Idlib Governorate as of 10 January 2019. Hayat Tahrir al-Sham and allies control National Front for Liberation and allies control Syrian National Army control Syrian Army control
| Date | 1–10 January 2019 (1 week and 2 days) |
| Location | Northwestern Syria: Idlib Governorate; Western Aleppo Governorate; Northwestern Hama Governorate |
| Result | Decisive Hay'at Tahrir al-Sham victory |
| Territorial changes | HTS extends its full administrative control over the entire NFL-held area at the Idlib, Aleppo, and Hama Governorates, after a signed agreement. |

Belligerents
| Syrian Salvation Government | National Front for Liberation (surrendered) (Syrian opposition) Syrian Interim Government Russia (4 Jan.) |

Commanders and leaders
| Ahmed al-Sharaa (Emir of Hay'at Tahrir al-Sham) | Tawfiq Shahabuddin (Leader of the Nour al-Din al-Zenki Movement); Cpt. Muammar Khattab (Jaysh al-Nasr commander) (POW) "Abu Bassam" Duraid al-Najm (Jaysh al-Nasr commander) (POW) |

Units involved
| Hay'at Tahrir al-Sham; Special Forces Brigade | National Front for Liberation; Ahrar al-Sham; Nour al-Din al-Zenki Movement (until 6 Jan.); Levant Revolutionaries Battalions (until 6 Jan.); Banners of Islam Movement (until 6 Jan.); (Syrian opposition) Suqour al-Sham Brigades; (Syrian opposition) Jaysh al-Nasr; (Syrian opposition) Free Idlib Army; Jaysh al-Nukhba; Syrian National Army; Russian Armed Forces (4 Jan.); Aerospace Forces |

Casualties and losses
| 68 killed 13 captured | 61 killed 10 captured |
- 8 civilians killed

The National Front for Liberation–Tahrir al-Sham conflict began on 1 January 2019 during clashes between Nour al-Din al-Zenki Movement and Hay'at Tahrir al-Sham (HTS), after HTS launched an attack against the group in Darat Izza, Taqad, and Khan al-Asal fronts in rebel-held western Aleppo. The conflict ended on 10 January 2019, after the National Front for Liberation agreed to withdraw, allowing HTS to take over almost all of the remaining opposition-held areas of the Idlib pocket.

== Background ==
Hay'at Tahrir al-Sham attacked Harakat Nour al-Din al-Zenki in response to recent assassinations of HTS' members in the area of Darat Izza on behalf of the al-Zenki movement.

== Conflict ==
=== HTS attacks Nour al-Din al-Zenki ===
Clashes began on 1 January 2019 when HTS seized the Nour al-Din al-Zenki Movement controlled town of Darat Izza and several towns in Western Aleppo.

On 2 January Tahrir al-Sham fully captured Darat Izza, as well as Kafr Tin, Urum al-Kubra, Khan al-Assal, and Maklabis from the Nour al-Din al-Zenki Movement in western Aleppo. National front for Liberation released a statement announcing full mobilization of the body in order to repel Tahrir al-Sham's attacks, while Hurras al-Deen reportedly joined the clashes on Tahrir al-Sham's side. In Idlib province, the National Front for Liberation made advances in the eastern part of Saraqib and captured Tell Mansour checkpoint, as well as the village of Jaradah in southern Idlib. On the same day, the National Front for Liberation issued a directive ordering fighters positioned against the Syrian government and allied forces on the front lines not to withdraw from their positions in order to attack Hay'at Tahrir al-Sham. Jaysh al-Islam also reportedly announced they would take part in fighting against Hay'at Tahrir al-Sham from Afrin due to preexisting hostilities between HTS and JAI from East Ghouta.

On 3 January, according to the Syrian Observatory for Human Rights (SOHR), National Front for Liberation captured al-Zawiyah and al-Ghadqa town in Maarrat al-Nu'man District, after an attack on the sites of Tahrir al-Sham there, while the clashes continue between both parties in the area, the clashes continue in Babila area at the highway of Saraqib Maarrat al-Nu’man and other places in the southern countryside of Idlib. On the same day, according to pro-government sources, Hay'at Tahrir al-Sham captured four towns in the Hama Governorate.

On 4 January, SOHR reported that clashes continued between Nour al-Din al-Zenki of National Liberation Front and Tahrir al-Sham, in the areas of Kafrentin, Senkhar, and the vicinity and outskirts of Darat Izza, that clashes renewed between National Liberation Front against Tahrir al-Sha in the areas of Qah and Salwah in the northern countryside of Idlib, and that Tahrir al-Sham took control over Jamiat al-Arman, in the opposition-held part of the western Aleppo countryside and captured the towns of Sinkhar, al-Hota and the 111th Regiment base from the Nour al-Din al-Zenki Movement. Tahrir al-Sham also reportedly entered the town of A’wejel after reaching an agreement with the local council there. Tarir al-Sham soon made a move on Jaysh al-Nasr, arresting two of its leaders in Khan Sheikhoun, Idlib Governorate under unknown circumstances.

On the same day, the Russian Air Force reportedly launched airstrikes on Darat Izza and Base 111 which were recently captured by Tahrir al-Sham from the Nour al-Din al-Zenki movement.

On 5 January, SOHR reported that Tahrir al-Sham shelled Deir Ballut in Afrin countryside controlled by the Olive Branch forces of the Syrian National Army, while clashes continued between Tahrir al-Sham and National Front for Liberation near the border town of Atme. At dawn on Saturday, a large military convoy including tens of vehicles and members was brought by Hay'at Tahrir al-Sham to areas in the southern countryside of Idlib, and negotiations took place with between Tahrir al-Sham and Nour al-Din al-Zenki movement about the latter withdrawing towards Afrin area.

On 6 January, Tahrir al-Sham entered the city of Atarib with military columns, after an agreement was reached after midnight of yesterday with factions of Thowwar al-Sham and Bayareq al-Islam. The agreement came after hours of violent clashes after an attack by Tahrir al-Sham to take control of the town. Meanwhile, according to SOHR, more than 400 fighters of Nour al-Din al-Zenki arrived in the areas controlled by the TFSA in the northeastern and northwestern parts of Aleppo, after they surrendered in the clashes against Tahrir al-Sham, with the expectation that the number of arrivals would increase to 500 fighters.

On 7 January, SOHR reported that the countryside of Idlib continued witnessing a mobilization by the rival factions in their areas of control, with the National Liberation Front factions continuing to reinforce their points and fortify them and bringing more fighters to the checkpoints, such as in the outskirts of Maarrat al-Nu'man, Ariha, and others. Tahrir Al-Sham brought reinforcements to Ariha area in the southern sector of Idlib countryside, as well as the areas of Bsonqul, Basames and Qarsaya; according to SOHR these reinforcements come as a part of preparations by Tahrir Al-Sham to expand its control again within Idlib province. On the same day, the Rouse the Believers Operations Room, which includes Ansar al-Islam, Jabhat Ansar al-Din remnants, the Guardians of Religion Organization, and Ansar al-Tawhid, published a statement condemning the infighting and called for all issues and differences between HTS and the NLF to be resolved in a Sharia court. The NFL's Jaysh al-Thani Army also published a document renouncing the infighting.

=== Expansion into Al-Ghab Plain ===
Map of the changing frontlines during the conflict

On 8 January, clashes continued between Tahrir al-Sham and factions belonging to the National Front for Liberation in several sectors of Hama and Idlib countryside. National Front for Liberation launched a counterattack on positions of Tahrir al-Sham in Sfuhen town, which caused the advancement of the National Front for Liberation factions and besieging members of Tahrir al-Sham in several pockets in the town and injuring others, in addition to damaging several vehicles of Tahrir al-Sham, which is bringing more military reinforcements to the area. The clashes described as the most violent took place between both parties, in Tremla area and villages of Jabal Shashabo and Sahl al-Ghab, and the vicinity of Hbit and Abdin, which caused casualties in the ranks of both parties. While Tahrir al-Sham was able to achieve an important advancement in Sahl al-Ghab at the western country of Hama, and control one of the most important strongholds of Ahrar al-Sham faction, al-Ankawi village, according to SOHR it contains a headquarters large enough to accommodate tanks. Tahrir al-Sham also managed to advance and control each of Naqir, Abdin, Arinbeh, Stuh al-Dier, Tremla, and parts of Sfuhen, while heavy and medium machinegun targeting took place this morning on the outskirts of Maarat al-Nu’man and Ariha. HTS also clashed with NFL forces in the Ghab Plain region, capturing the towns of Al-Ankawi, Al-Amqiya, Al-Zaqum, Al-Daqmaq, Qalidin, and Al-Hamidiyah. On the same day, Jaysh al-Izza announced their neutrally in the conflict.

=== NFL surrender ===
On 9 January 2019, a truce was agreed to, with the NFL surrendering their last positions in southwestern Idlib to Tahrir al-Sham, with Jaysh al-Izza being the only other group allowed to operate in that area.

During the 9 day conflict, HTS captured around 90 areas, which gave them about 80% control over rebel territories in greater Idlib, or about 7200 km² out of about 8937 km², prior to the NFL's surrender. On 10 January, Tahrir al-Sham took control of the remaining territories that were formerly held by the NFL, with the exception of several towns in the Hama countryside.

== Aftermath ==
On 30 April 2019, the Syrian Army launched a large-scale offensive on the Idlib pocket, beginning with an aerial bombing campaign, and then launching a ground offensive on 6 May. The offensive came after numerous HTS attacks, culminating with an attack by the HTS on 27 April that left 22 pro-government fighters dead.

== See also ==
- al-Nusra Front–SRF/Hazzm Movement conflict
- October 2016 Idlib Governorate clashes
- Idlib Governorate clashes (January–March 2017)
- Idlib Governorate clashes (July 2017)
- East Ghouta inter-rebel conflict (April–May 2017)
- Syrian Liberation Front–Tahrir al-Sham conflict
