= Unified Military Council (Idlib) =

Turkish-sponsored joint operation of Syrian rebel groups

- Arabic: المجلس العسكري الموحد
- Leaders: Capt. Anad Darwish ("Abu al-Mundhir", Ahrar al-Sham); "Abu Hassan 600" (Hayat Tahrir al-Sham); Hajj Muhammad Horan ("Abu Assid", Sham Legion)
- Dates active: October 2020 – January 2025
- Groups: National Front for Liberation; Hayat Tahrir al-Sham
- Active regions: Northwestern Syria: Idlib Governorate; Aleppo Governorate; Hama Governorate; Latakia Governorate
- Wars: Syrian Civil War and Turkish military operation in Idlib Governorate

The Unified Military Council (Arabic: المجلس العسكري الموحد), also known as the Joint Tripartite Military Committee, was a Turkish intelligence and military-sponsored joint operations room between the National Front for Liberation and Hayat Tahrir al-Sham, the two major armed rebel groups based in the Idlib Governorate in northwestern Syria. The council was formed as a restructuring of the Great Conquest Operations Room in October 2020, after several months of preparation following the end of the latest offensive by the Syrian Armed Forces against rebels in Idlib.

== Composition ==
The leadership triumvirate of the council includes Captain "Abu al-Mundhir" from Ahrar al-Sham (NFL), "Abu Hassan 600" from Hayat Tahrir al-Sham, and Hajj Muhammad Horan ("Abu Assid") from the Sham Legion (NFL).

Abu al-Mundhir is the leader of the military wing of Ahrar al-Sham, which has been involved in a leadership struggle with the group's overall command, led by Jaber Ali Pasha, since 12 October 2020. Abu al-Mundhir demanded that Pasha be replaced with the former Ahrar al-Sham leader Hassan Soufan ("Abu al-Bara"). The idea of the Tripartite Military Committee was reportedly proposed by Soufan himself, who is alleged by Pasha to be supported by HTS. Both Soufan and HTS denied the latter's involvement. The dispute escalated into open mutiny on 23 October.

Abu al-Assid is the commander of the Sham Legion's Idlib sector and a member of the legion's military council.

According to a rebel leader from Idlib who spoke to Alhurra under condition of anonymity, the council plans to form 10 "brigades" from HTS, 10 brigades from the Sham Legion, 5 from Ahrar al-Sham, and one each from the Suqour al-Sham Brigades and Jaysh al-Ahrar, with each brigade consisting of between 600 and 800 personnel.

== See also ==
- Foreign involvement in the Syrian Civil War
- List of armed groups in the Syrian Civil War
