= Azadî Battalion =

Kurdish Free Syrian Army Unit

Azadî Battalion / Elite Battalion
- Arabic: كتيبة آزادي
- Flag of Kurdistan, as used by the Azadî Battalion
- Leader: Azad Shabo
- Dates active: early 2012 – 2025
- Allegiance: Mustafa Cumma's Kurdish Freedom Party (officially denied)
- Active regions: Aleppo Governorate, Syria
- Size: 100 (self-claimed)
- Part of: Free Syrian Army; Army of Mujahideen; Syrian National Army; Elite Army
- Wars: the Syrian Civil War

The Azadî Battalion (Arabic: كتيبة آزادي), also known as the Elite Battalion, was a Kurdish unit affiliated with the Free Syrian Army and reportedly loyal to Mustafa Cumma's Kurdish Freedom Party (also called Azadî Party). (Note: There also exists another "Kurdish Freedom Party" in Syria that was led by Mustafa Jum'ah and unrelated to the Azadî Battalion.) Founded in 2012 and led by Azad Shabo, the Azadî Battalion was opposed to the Democratic Union Party (PYD) and fights on the side of Turkey in the Syrian Civil War.

== History ==
=== Early phase of the civil war and decline ===
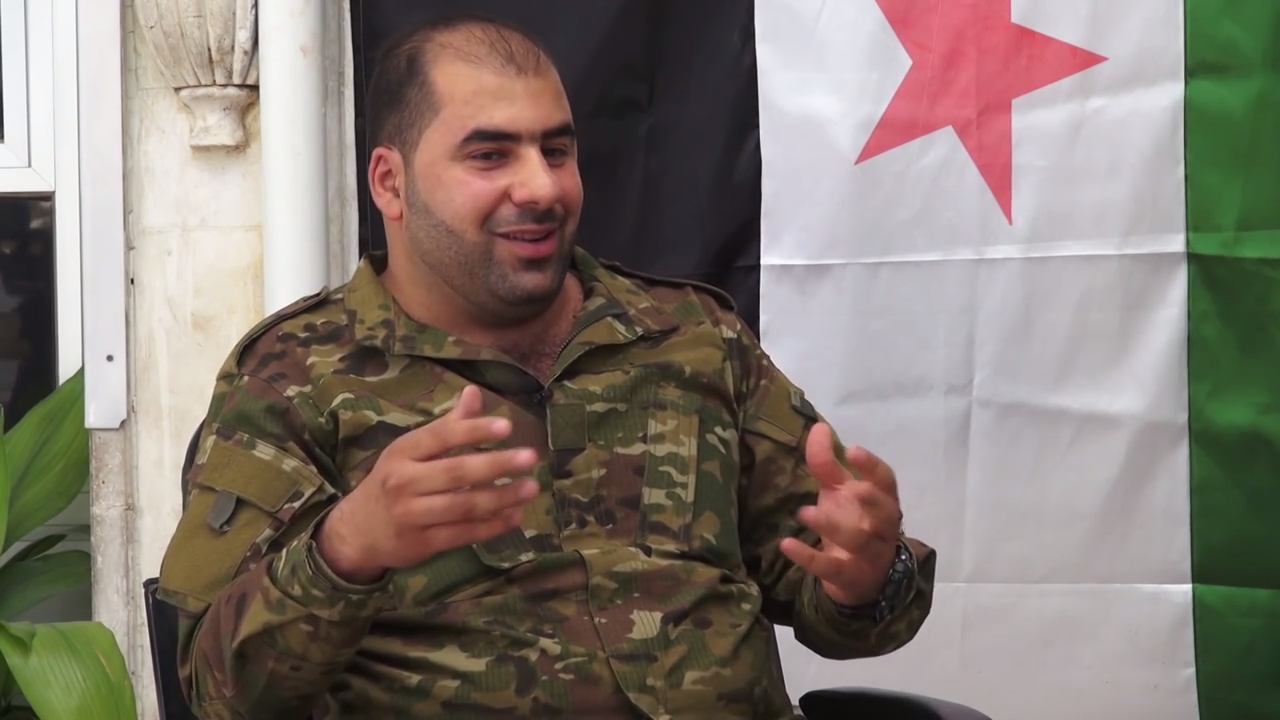
Azad Shabo, commander of the Azadî Battalion, in May 2016, when it was part of the Army of Mujahideen.

Mustafa Cumma's Kurdish Freedom Party was a long-standing rival of the Democratic Union Party (PYD) and strongly opposes its policies. In early 2012, members of the Kurdish Freedom Party came together in the village of Tel Aren, Afrin District, where they announced the formation of the Azadî Battalion under the leadership of Azad Shabo. (Note: By October 2012, there also existed a Kurdish Free Syrian Army unit in al-Hasakah known as "Azadi Brigade", though it was not known if this unit had any relation to the Azadî Battalion.) Though considered "supporters of the Kurdish Freedom Party", the Azadî Battalion denied an affiliation to any party. It subsequently joined the anti-PYD Free Syrian Army and the Aleppo Revolutionary Military Council, led by Abdul Jabbar al-Oqaidi; the pro-PYD Hawar News Agency has accused the militia of directly working with the al-Nusra Front in Ras al-Ayn. After the formation of a PYD/YPG-aligned FSA group, named the Kurdish Front, at the end of 2012 and the beginning of 2013, the influence of other Kurdish FSA groups such as the Azadî Battalion and the Saladin Ayubi Brigade began to decline.

Meanwhile, Cumma's Kurdish Freedom Party left the Kurdish Supreme Committee, an attempted coalition government of pro- and anti-PYD parties for the Syrian Kurdish-held territories, in February 2013. Hostilities between the two parties consequently grew, and the Azadî Battalion clashed with the YPG at the villages of Burj Abdilla and Abdilla in the Afrin Region on 7 March 2013. Both sides blamed each other for this incident that left four fighters dead. Sporadic fighting between the two groups continued, and Azadî Battalion fighters reportedly took part in attacks on the YPG-held Sheikh Maqsood neighborhood of Aleppo since September 2013. The group also fought with other rebels against the Syrian Army in Aleppo's Khan al-Asal and Rashidin.

When the al-Nusra Front and allied FSA units attacked and overran the Kurdish Front's positions at Tall Hasil and Tall Aran southeast of Aleppo International Airport, the Azadî Battalion was accused of having taken part in the fighting. The battalion itself denied this, while a FSA member declared that the Azadî Battalion had simply started policing the villages after their capture by the FSA. Nevertheless, the Kurdish Supreme Committee consequently started an investigation of the Azadî Battalion "for allegedly taking part in the attacks against West Kurdistan". The Kurdish Institute of Brussels condemned the Azadî Battalion for the same reasons. Meanwhile, hardcore Islamist rebel groups accused the Azadî Battalion of working with the Kurdish Front.

By 2016, the Azadî Battalion had joined the Army of Mujahideen. In May 2016, Azad Shabo gave an interview to Halab Today, claiming that the Syrian government, not the FSA, was shelling Sheikh Maqsood, while also accusing the YPG forces in Sheikh Maqsood of being allied to the government. He also said that the YPG helped to break the Siege of Nubl and al-Zahraa, and that the PYD's rule over Afrin was a brutal, mismanaged dictatorship. Though the Azadî Battalion continued to fight against the YPG, its power reportedly dwindled over time, and pro-PYD media claimed that parts of the militia under Mahmut Hamo eventually split off and joined the Sultan Murad Division. The rest of the Azadî Battalion eventually joined the Elite Army while remaining under Azad Shabo's command. The unit thereafter came to call itself the "Elite Battalion", though also continued to use its old name. It was unclear how numerous the unit still is; Shabo said in late January 2018 that there were "dozens" of Kurds fighting with pro-Turkish forces in Syria, though claimed a few weeks later that his unit included "100 Kurdish fighters affiliated with the FSA".

=== Operations with the SNA ===
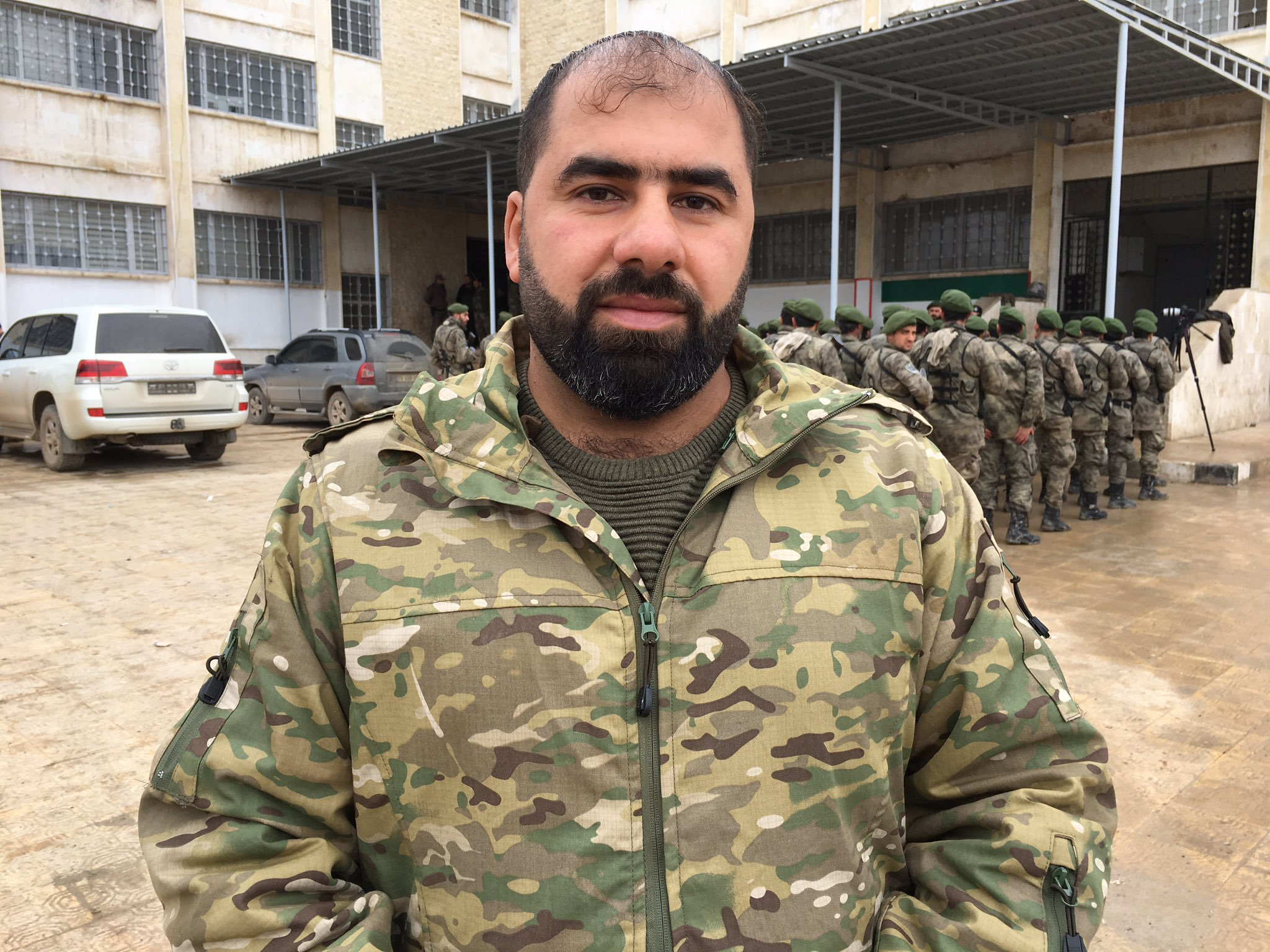
Azad Shabo and his fighters during the Turkish-led offensive in Afrin on 24 January 2018.

The Azadî Battalion became part of the Syrian National Army in 2016 and took part in Operation Euphrates Shield against the Islamic State of Iraq and the Levant. In course of that campaign, it fought at Jarablus, Azaz and al-Bab. In March 2017, Azad Shabo stated that his militia was supporting the deployment of Peshmerga Roj to Syria.

In September 2017, someone attempted to assassinate Azad Shabo by placing a bomb under his car, though the explosive device was found and destroyed before it could harm anyone. In early 2018, the Azadî Battalion participated in Operation Olive Branch, causing the pro-PYD Hawar News Agency to claim that Azad Shabo's men acted as "mercenaries" for the Kurdish National Council and Turkey. On the other side, Azad Shabo accused the YPG of being "agents of the Syrian regime" and said that the campaign would not end before Afrin had been captured from the YPG. In another interview, he further stated that "Afrin will return to the arms of the Syrian revolution and will win back the rights of its people. The YPG was no different from Assad’s regime. They have both practiced tyranny and murder against Kurds. Operation Olive Branch will liberate Afrin's inhabitants." An Azadî Battalion commander accused Iran of increasing its presence through proxy militias in southeastern Aleppo in October 2018, claiming that said militias were lawless and not loyal to Syrian authorities.

In late 2019, the Azadî Battalion took part in the Turkish offensive into north-eastern Syria.

== Ideology ==
The Azadî Battalion claims to fight for democracy and the liberation of all Syrians from the rule of the al-Assad family. It regards the PYD and YPG/YPJ as Ba'athist, chauvinist and racist proxies of the Kurdistan Workers' Party who are thought by the Azadî Battalion to be controlled by Iran and closely allied with the Syrian government. Furthermore, Azad Shabo has stated his belief that the "PYD was formed to fight Islam". The Azadî Battalion officially voiced support for the Kurdish National Council in 2017.

== See also ==
- Descendants of Saladin Brigade
- Saladin Ayubi Brigade
