= 1st Coastal Division =

Syrian Rebel Group

- الفرقة الأولى الساحلية
- Leaders: Muhammad Haj Ali; Capt. Basil Zamo †
- Dates active: 2014 – November, 2023
- Active regions: Idlib Governorate; Latakia Governorate
- Size: 2800 (2015)
- Part of: Free Syrian Army: National Front for Liberation (since May 2018)
- Wars: the Syrian civil war

The 1st Coastal Division, formerly known as the Brigade of the Chargers (Arabic: لواء العاديات), was a Syrian rebel group that is affiliated with the Free Syrian Army and has been vetted by the Friends of Syria Group. It received TOW missiles and operates in the Idlib and northern Latakia governorates. The group received training and funding from Qatar. It is a former member of the Ahfad al-Rasul Brigades.

== History ==
The group participated in the 2014 Latakia offensive and the 2015 Jisr al-Shughur offensive with a wide array of Syrian opposition forces. As part of the Latakia offensive, the group briefly captured the Mediterranean town of Kasab, acquiring their name.

1st Coastal Division is famous for including Free Syrian Army war hero Abo Hamza who became notable on social media for his many skillful BGM-71 TOW missile shots.

In October 2015 the 1st Coastal Division's chief of staff, Captain Basil Zamo, was killed in a Russian airstrike on Jabal al-Akrad, Latakia.

In April 2016, the group together with Ahrar al-Sham, Al-Nusra Front, and the Turkistan Islamic Party attacked Syrian government positions in northeastern Latakia Governorate, capturing the villages of Nakshaba, al-Bayyada and 50% of Mount Qamou'.

On 30 June 2017, military commanders of the 21st Combined Force, the 23rd Division, the Central Division, and the 1st Coastal Division signed the Geneva Call's "Deed of Agreement" pledging to protect children in the war, prohibit sexual violence, and prevent sexism.

In May 2018, along with 10 other rebel groups in northwestern Syria, the 1st Coastal Division formed the National Front for Liberation, which was officially announced on 28 May.

In October of 2019, the NFL merged with the Syrian National Army, though this merger was done without the prior knowledge of either the SNA NFL’s fighters.

On 11 November 2023, the National Front for Liberation announced that the 1st and 2nd Costal Divisions are being merged into the Costal Division.

At the Syrian Revolution Victory Conference, which was held on 29 January 2025, most factions of the armed opposition, including the Syrian National Army and its components, announced their dissolution and were incorporated into the newly formed Ministry of Defense.

== See also ==
- List of armed groups in the Syrian Civil War
