= Shields of the Revolution Council =

Syrian Rebel Group

- هيئة دروع الثورة
- Logo of the Shields
- Dates active: January 2013 - early 2015
- Active regions: Idlib Governorate
- Ideology: Islamic democracy Sunni Islamism
- Size: 5,000 - 7,000
- Part of: Muslim Brotherhood of Syria; Free Syrian Army; Syrian Revolutionary Command Council
- Wars: the Syrian civil war

The Shields of the Revolution Council (Arabic: هيئة دروع الثورة, Hayat Duru al-Thawra) was a Syrian FSA-rebel alliance affiliated with the Muslim Brotherhood of Syria. Bashar al-Assad labeled the Syrian branch of the Muslim Brotherhood as an extremist “terror” group. It joined the Syrian Revolutionary Command Council on 3 August 2014.

In March 2014, the Fatiheen Brigade, Eman Brigade and Sihem al-Haq Brigade, previously affiliated with the Shields, split from the group and joined the newly formed Sham Legion alliance.

== Member groups ==
- Dera al-Jabal

== See also ==
- List of armed groups in the Syrian Civil War
