= Saladin Ayubi Brigade =

Kurdish Free Syrian Army Unit

- Arabic: لواء صلاح الدين الأيوبي; Kurdish: Tugaya Selahedîn Eyûbî
- Logo of the Saladin Ayubi Brigade
- Leaders: Capt. Bewar Mustafa; Lt. Col. Shawqi Othman (kidnapped in April 2013)
- Dates active: May 2012 – mid-2015 (defunct)
- Groups: Saladin Ayubi Battalion; Kaveh the blacksmith Battalion; Peshmerga Hawks Battalion; Newroz Battalion; Mullah Mustafa Barzani Battalion; Martyr Ayoub al-Naysani Battalion; Martyr Muhammad Rajab Battalion
- Active regions: Aleppo Governorate
- Ideology: Democracy, Pluralism, Secularism
- Size: 230 (early 2013): 30 active fighters; 200 in reserve; 50–100 (late 2012)
- Part of: Free Syrian Army; Syrian Kurdish Revolutionary Council (Komala); Kurdish Military Council; 16th Division (late 2013); Syrian Revolutionaries Front (April–October 2014)
- Wars: the Syrian Civil War

The Saladin Ayubi Brigade (Arabic: لواء صلاح الدين الأيوبي, Kurdish: Serhêza Selah Eldîn El Eyûbî) was a mainly-Syrian Kurdish armed rebel group that fought in the Syrian Civil War as part of the Free Syrian Army. Formed in May 2012 and named after the early Kurdish Muslim leader Saladin, the group was led by defected Syrian Army Captain Bewar Mustafa and fought against Syrian government forces in and around the city of Aleppo. It was also strongly opposed to the Kurdish-led Democratic Union Party (PYD), and clashed with the PYD-affiliated People's Protection Units (YPG) and the Women's Protection Units (YPJ) several times.

== Ideology ==
The Saladin Ayubi Brigade used both the flag of Kurdistan and the Syrian independence flag.

Although the majority of fighters within the Saladin Ayubi Brigade were Kurds, the group also contained Arabs and Turkmen. Capt. Bewar Mustafa, commander of the group, stated during an interview in February 2013 that "We believe in democracy, equal rights for all, and representation. This is automatically against sectarianism. We are the Free Syrian Army for all Syrians, not just for one group, and the Kurds in this are a moderating force." Lieutenant Colonel Shawqi Othman, another commander in the group, also stated that "We want a civil, democratic government which treats everyone equally".

Despite ideological differences, the Saladin Ayubi Brigade closely cooperated with Islamist rebel groups, including the al-Tawhid Brigade and the Free Syria Brigade. The group defended this alliance by claiming that it was a way for them to "pay its dues to the revolution". It also fought alongside the Salafist jihadist al-Nusra Front. However, Capt. Mustafa exclaimed that "I swear to God, if some radicals want to go kill the Alawites, we will fight with our guns and die to defend the Alawites because we are the army for all Syrians."

In response to accusations that the Saladin Ayubi Brigade served agendas of Turkey, Mustafa replied with "First, I am a Kurd. I am proud of my nation. I do not need Turkey or any other country to guide me." In addition, Mustafa denied any affiliation with Salah Badr al-Din's wing of the Kurdish Freedom Party. (Note: Salah Badr al-Din supported FSA operations in Kurdish areas and reportedly planned to infiltrate Afrin and drag the YPG into intra-Kurdish conflict.)

Mustafa also stated in August 2013 that due to ideological differences, he will not join "any Kurdish project that has the YPG in it". Lt. Col. Othman claimed that the PYD and PKK were allied with the Syrian government. Mohammed Suleiman, an activist who worked with the Saladin Ayubi Brigade, called the PKK "mercenaries and criminals". Despite this, he stated that "If the choice is between Jabhat al-Nusra or the PKK, I will always choose the PKK."

== History ==
=== Establishment and early activities ===
The Saladin Ayubi Battalion was formed in May 2012 by a group of armed Kurdish rebels, among them university students, in a village near Afrin. On 12 May, Captain Bewar Mustafa, a military engineer in the Syrian Army, defected to join the Free Syrian Army in the city of al-Rastan. Mustafa was among the FSA officers who met with members of the United Nations Supervision Mission in Syria in Rastan.

Later in mid-2012, Mustafa contacted members of the Saladin Ayubi Battalion and arrived in Afrin to join the group as its commander. After more fighters joined the group, it was renamed as the Saladin Ayubi Brigade. It participated in clashes against government forces around Aleppo, before entering the city itself and taking part in the Battle of Aleppo. Under the command of Capt. Mustafa, the group fought in the Karm al-Jabal, Ashrafiya, Khalidiya, and Bani Zaid neighbourhoods of Aleppo city. It also took part in the Siege of Menagh Air Base, the Siege of Nubl and Al-Zahraa, and cooperated with the Azadî Battalion along the frontline south of Aleppo International Airport.

On 26 October 2012, clashes erupted between the YPG and other rebel groups, including the Saladin Ayubi Brigade, in the Ashrafiya neighbourhood of Aleppo. During the clashes on 1 November, the Saladin Ayubi Brigade captured Nujin Derik, a female YPG commander. The group, however, denied involvement in the clashes, and stated that it did not want to fight the YPG in Kurdish areas. On 5 November, a ceasefire agreement was signed between the YPG and PYD and FSA groups in Aleppo, promising the release of prisoners and closer cooperation in the fight against the Assad government. Derik was released 5 days later.

=== Later activities and dissolution ===
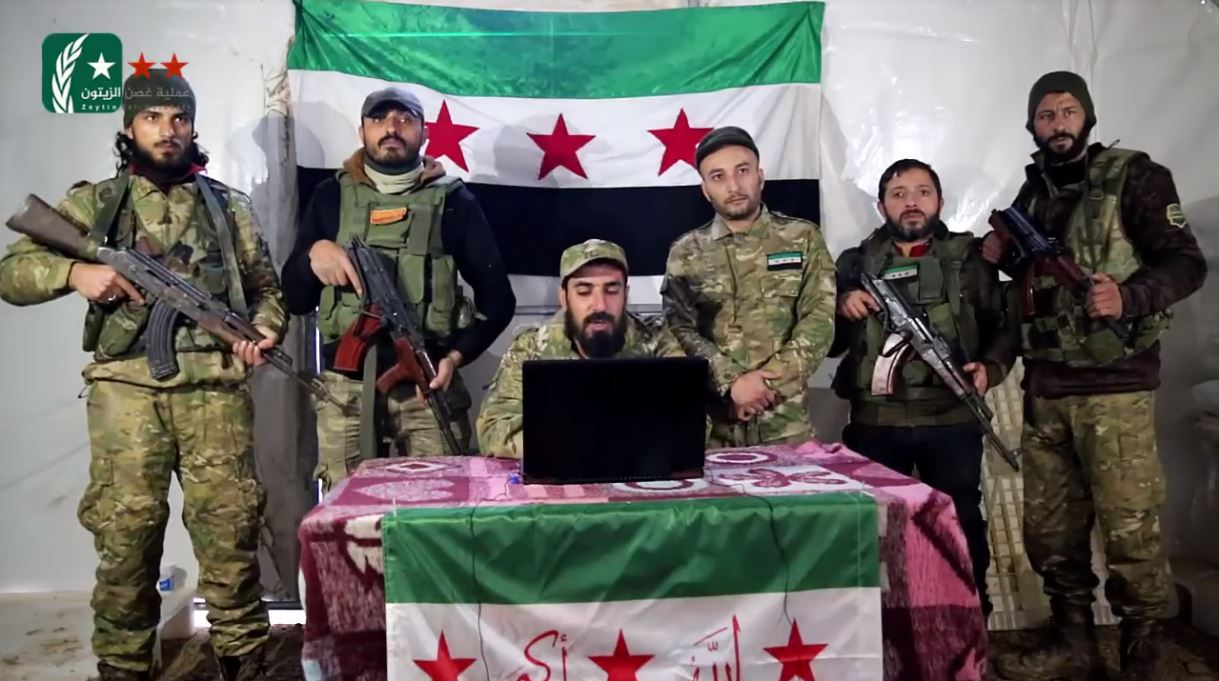
Capt. Bewar Mustafa, former commander of the Saladin Ayubi Brigade, considers Kurdish fighters in the Turkish-backed Free Syrian Army (pictured participating in the Turkish military operation in Afrin, January 2018) to be "mercenaries".

On 15 April 2013, 8 defected Kurdish military officers from Syria, including Lt. Col. Shawqi Othman of the Saladin Ayubi Brigade, were kidnapped at the Iraq–Syria border by unknown parties. The officers were heading to Iraqi Kurdistan to join the Peshmerga. One of the officers' relatives accused the PYD of involvement in their abductions.

In September 2013, clashes renewed between the YPG and its ally, the Kurdish Front, and other rebel groups in Aleppo, including the Saladin Ayubi Brigade, part of the Syrian Kurdish Revolutionary Council (Komala). On 19 September, the 16th Division was formed, with the Saladin Ayubi Brigade as a member group.

The pro-PYD Firat News Agency considered fighters of the group to be "mercenaries", and the 16th Division itself was considered "criminal gangs" by some residents in Aleppo, resulting in the group being attacked by Islamic State of Iraq and the Levant since October 2013. As part of the 16th Division, the Saladin Ayubi Brigade fought ISIL in Aleppo at the end of 2013.

On 4 April 2014, the Syrian Kurdish Revolutionary Council (Komala), having left the 16th Division, joined the Syrian Revolutionaries Front. In its accession statement, Capt. Bewar Mustafa called the PYD "tools of repression and intimidation by the Assad regime". Despite this, Mustafa and the Komala announced solidarity with Kobanî when ISIL attacked the city in September 2014, and demanded the SRF to provide military assistance to the YPG-led forces fighting against the ISIL offensive. Komala withdrew from the SRF on 6 October when it failed to respond.

In 2015, Captain Bewar Mustafa laid down his arms, and the Saladin Ayubi Brigade last appeared in July 2015. During the Operation Olive Branch in early 2018, Mustafa called FSA fighters participating in the offensive "mercenaries" and "a tool in the hands of their masters, even against their own kinsmen". He also claimed that "both sides are going to lose".

== See also ==
- Descendants of Saladin Brigade
- YPG–FSA relations
