= Sham Legion =

Syrian Rebel Group

- فَيْلَق الشَّام
- Flag of the Sham Legion Logo of the Sham Legion
- Leaders: Commander-in-chief: Fadlallah al-Haji; Leader (2014): Munther Saras; Top commander: Col. Mohammad Bakkar †; Field commander: Zuheir Harba †; Senior commander: Feisal Balkash †; Field commander (2014–18): Maj. Yasser Abdul Rahim; Field commander: Khaldun Mador ("Abu Jamil")
- Dates active: 10 March 2014 – 29 January 2025
- Active regions: Western and northern Syria: Aleppo Governorate; Idlib Governorate; Hama Governorate; Latakia Governorate; Homs Governorate (2014–18)
- Ideology: Sunni Islamism; Anti-Assadism; Pro-Syrian opposition Democracy
- Size: 4,000 (Russian military claim, December 2016); 8,500-10,000 fighters (2018 estimate)
- Part of: (Syrian opposition) Free Syrian Army; Syrian Revolutionary Command Council (2014–15); Fatah Halab (2015–16); Army of Conquest (2015–16); Mare' Operations Room (2014–16); Northern Homs Countryside Operations Room (until 2018); Northern Hama Countryside Operations Room (until 2018); Revolutionaries of Atarib (March–April 2018); (Syrian opposition) Syrian National Army (from 2017); Hawar Kilis Operations Room (since 2016); National Front for Liberation (from May 2018); Military Operations Command
- Wars: the Syrian Civil War and the Libyan Civil War (2014–present)

The Sham Legion (Arabic: فَيْلَق الشَّام, Faylaq al-Shām lit. Levant Legion) was an alliance of Sunni Islamist rebel groups formed in March 2014, during the Syrian Civil War. The alliance was formed from 19 different groups, some of which were previously affiliated with the Muslim Brotherhood of Syria and the Shields of the Revolution Council.

At the Syrian Revolution Victory Conference, which was held on 29 January 2025, most factions of the armed opposition, including the Sham Legion, announced their dissolution and were incorporated into the newly formed Ministry of Defense.

== History ==
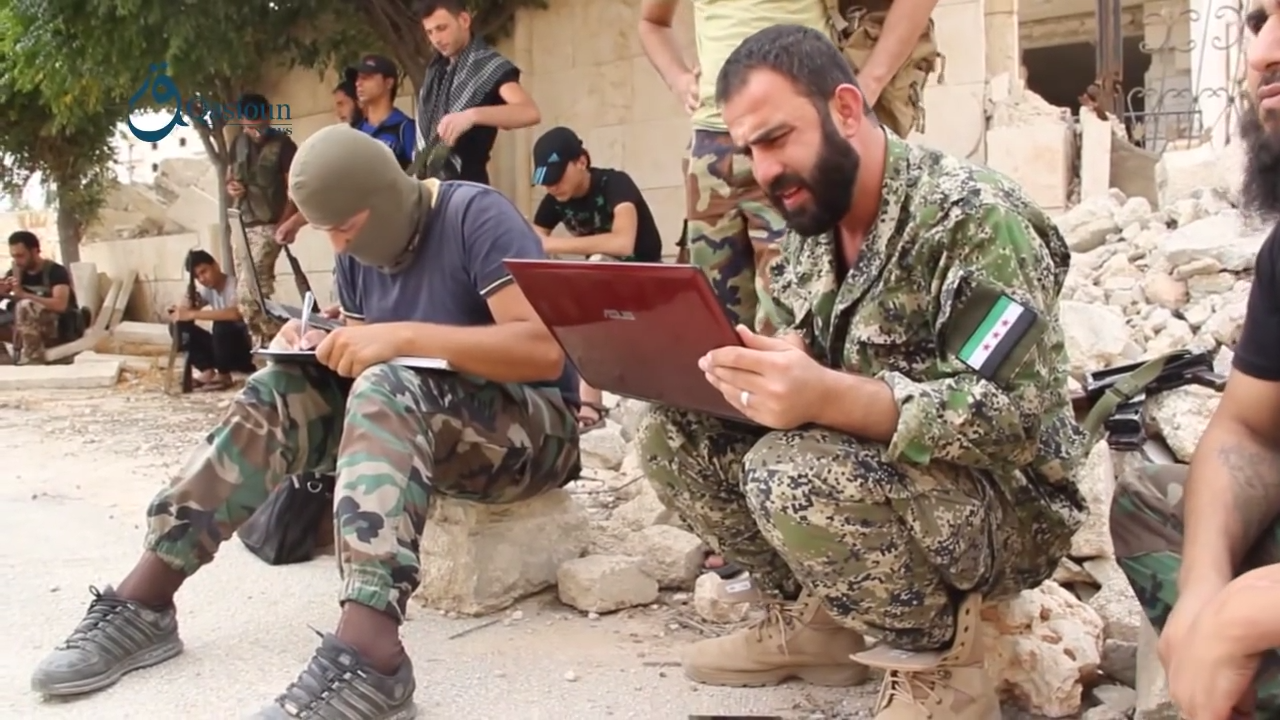
Major Yasser Abdul Rahim, field commander of the Sham Legion and commander of Fatah Halab during the Battle of Aleppo, coordinating an attack on YPG positions in the Sheikh Maqsood neighbourhood of Aleppo, 2 October 2015.

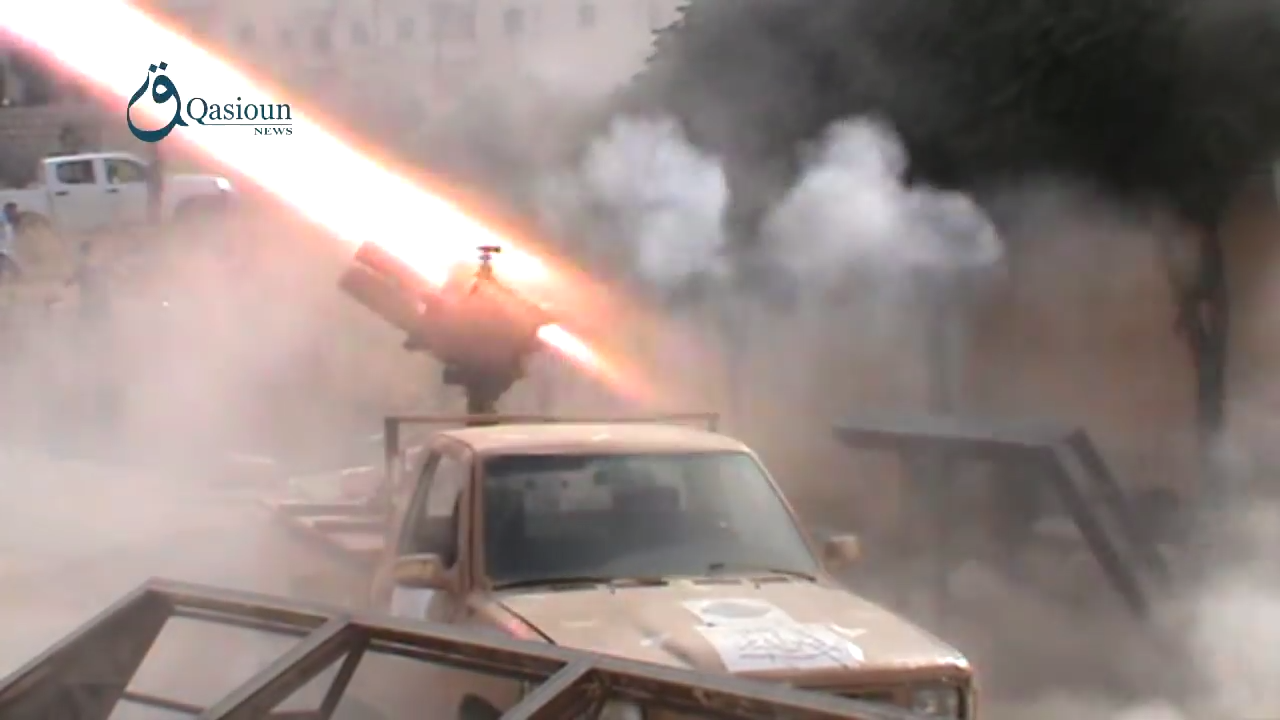
Sham Legion multiple rocket launcher mounted on a technical launch rockets at YPG positions in Aleppo, 2 October 2015.

The Sham Legion was formed on 10 March 2014 from 19 Islamist rebel groups in Syria. These groups operated from the Aleppo Governorate to Damascus, but were concentrated in the Idlib, Hama, and Homs governorates. The formation aimed to "unify the ranks" of non-al-Qaeda-affiliated Islamist rebels in Syria. After its formation, the group took part in the Battle of Morek and Khan Shaykhun in 2014. Upon the formation of the group, it immediately distanced itself from the Syrian Muslim Brotherhood in order to win Saudi aid. The group also sent advisers to support Libya Dawn forces based in Tripoli, which were fighting against the Libyan National Army.

On 24 March 2015, the Army of Conquest, an alliance of Sunni Islamist and Salafist jihadist groups in Syria, was announced, with the Sham Legion as a member group. As part of the Army of Conquest, the Sham Legion took part in the Battle of Idlib and the subsequent Idlib and wider Northwestern Syria offensives. On 26 April 2015, along with six other major Aleppo-based rebel groups (Ahrar al-Sham, Jaysh al-Islam, Fastaqim Union, Levant Front, Levant Revolutionaries Battalions, and Dawn of Caliphate Battalions), the Sham Legion established the Fatah Halab joint operations room. Major Yasser Abdul Rahim, field commander of the Sham Legion, was appointed commander of Fatah Halab, a position he maintained until government forces recaptured all of Aleppo in December 2016.

Between 2014 and 2016, the Sham Legion was at one point a rebel group vetted by the United States and received BGM-71 TOW anti-tank missiles from it. In January 2016, the Northern Brigade was formed as part of the Sham Legion in the Aleppo Governorate. The group participated in Operation Euphrates Shield, which began on 24 August 2016 in Jarabulus and aimed to expel the Syrian Democratic Forces and the Islamic State from the northern Aleppo Governorate. Following the campaign, the Sham Legion became involved in inter-rebel conflict between the different Turkish-backed Free Syrian Army (TFSA) factions. On 30 May 2017, after increasing inter-rebel conflict in northern Aleppo, the Sham Legion expelled the Northern Brigade from its ranks and dismissed its commander, Captain Mustafa Rami al-Kuja. The Sham Legion, along with six other TFSA groups, formed the Victory Bloc in June 2017, while the Free North Brigade, formerly part of the al-Tawhid Brigade, joined the Sham Legion on 16 June 2017.

The Sham Legion also took part in the Turkish military intervention in Afrin in 2018, with its chief commander Major Yasser Abdul Rahim serving as a "key member" of the campaign's Olive Branch Operations' Room. Rahim stated that the operation against the Syrian Democratic Forces in the Afrin District intended to "liberate the area from all kinds of terrorism and protect civilians, Arabs and Kurds" and that the TFSA would attempt to avoid civilian casualties. On 7 February 2018, Rahim was dismissed from his position as commander without explanation, and was replaced by Khaldun Mador ("Abu Jamil"). Khaldun, reportedly the third highest-ranking commander of the Sham Legion. Rahim went on to join the Glory Corps. In May 2018, along with 10 other rebel groups in northwestern Syria, the Sham Legion formed the National Front for Liberation, which was officially announced on 28 May. Colonel Fadlallah al-Haji, commander of the Sham Legion, was appointed as the overall commander of the formation. On 4 June, the Martyrs of Islam Brigade, also part of the NFL, joined the Sham Legion.

On 26 October 2020, Russian warplanes targeted a training camp of the Sham Legion, near Kafr Takharim in Idlib Governorate. The strike killed at least 78 fighters and wounded over 100 more. The director of the Syrian Observatory for Human Rights, Rami Abdel Rahman, called the strike the heaviest attack since the beginning of the ceasefire in March 2020. A rebel spokesman gave estimates of more than 170 fighters dead or were wounded.

== Member groups ==
- Fatiheen Brigade
- Eman Brigade
- Sihem al-Haq Brigade
- Ajnad al-Sham Islamic Union Idlib branch
- Sadiq Brigade
- 10th Coastal Brigade
- 111th Regiment (until 2019)
- Free North Brigade
- Sham Commandos Brigade
  - Sons of Waer Battalion
  - Revolutionaries of Waer Battalion
- Martyrs of Islam Brigade
  - Martyrs of Daraya Battalion
  - Martyrs of the Revolution Battalion
  - Fayha al-Sham Battalion
  - Lions of Tawhid Battalion
  - Descendants of Saladin Battalion
  - Lions of Sunna Battalion
  - Special Task Force Battalion
  - Artillery Company
  - Engineering and Air Defence Company
- 20th Division
  - The Qaqaa Gathering

== See also ==
- List of armed groups in the Syrian Civil War
