= Sfuhen =

Sfuhen سفوهن
- Village
- Location in Syria
- Coordinates: 35°36′23″N 36°27′53″E
- Country: Syria
- Governorate: Idlib
- District: Maarrat al-Nu'man District
- Subdistrict: Kafr Nabl Nahiyah

Population (2004)
  - Total: 3,399
- Time zone: UTC+2 (EET)
  - Summer (DST): UTC+3 (EEST)
- City Qrya Pcode: C4054

Sfuhen (Arabic: سفوهن) is a Syrian village located in Kafr Nabl Nahiyah in Maarrat al-Nu'man District, Idlib. According to the Syria Central Bureau of Statistics (CBS), in the 2004 census, Sfuhen had a population of 3,399.

== Civil war period ==
=== 2019 ===
On September 14. Government warplanes targeted the Civil Defense Center in Sfuhen village, putting it out of service, and destroying an ambulance.

=== 2020 ===
In September. Syrian Observatory activists had monitored new round of regime rocket attacks in the early hours of Saturday morning, targeting positions in Sfuhen and other areas in the southern countryside of Idlib. Meanwhile, Russian reconnaissance drones were seen flying over the area. However, no casualties were reported.

One month later, in November. Regime forces once again used rocket attacks on oppositions positions in Sfuhen, after Hayat Tahrir al-Sham snipers targeted regime positions some time before.

=== 2021 ===
On the 18th of February. Syrian Government Forces targeted with rockets Sfuhen in southern rural Idlib.

In November. government forces continued bombing the opposition factions’ sites in the village of Sfuhen.

=== 2022 ===
In January, government forces once again targeted the opposition sites in the village of Sfuhen.

Around February, members of the HTS stormed the two camps of Umm Shohada' and Sfuhen, arrested several people, including a media activist, and fired bullets in the air injuring a child in the leg.

On December 22. At least one civilian was seriously injured by alleged Syrian regime and/or Russian artillery shelling of the village of Sfuhen

=== 2025 ===
In May, sometime after the fall of the Assad regime. A school in Sfuhen was reopened despite challenges and lack of possibilities.
