= Military Operations Command =

Syrian opposition joint operations room

- غرفة عمليات الفتح المبين al-Fatah al-Mubin
- Logo of the operations room.
- Leader: Abu Mohammad al-Julani
- Military leader: Murhaf Abu Qasra
- Spokesperson: Hassan Abdul Ghani
- Dates active: June 2019 – January 2025
- Groups: Hayat Tahrir al-Sham; National Front for Liberation; Jaysh al-Izza (Syrian opposition) Suqour al-Sham Brigades; Ansar al-Tawhid
- Active regions: Idlib Governorate, Latakia Governorate, Aleppo Governorate and Hama Governorate, Syria
- Ideology: Sunni Islamism; Islamic nationalism
- Wars: Syrian Civil War; Eastern Syria insurgency; Northwestern Syria offensive (December 2019–March 2020); Northwestern Syria clashes (December 2022–November 2024); 2024 Syrian opposition offensives; Battle of Aleppo (2024); Southern Syria offensive (2024); 2024 Hama offensive; Deir ez-Zor offensive (2024); Southern Syria offensive (2024); 2024 Homs offensive; Fall of Damascus (2024); Hezbollah–Syria clashes (2024–present); Western Syria clashes

The Military Operations Command, or the Military Operations Department, (Note: Arabic: إدارة العمليات العسكرية, romanized: iidarat aleamaliaat aleaskaria) formerly known as Al-Fatah al-Mubin until November 2024, (Note: Arabic: الفتح المُبين, lit. 'Great Conquest') was a joint military operations room of Sunni Islamist and nationalist factions of the Syrian opposition which participated in the Syrian civil war. The operations room was declared in June 2019, evolving from the "Damascus Conquest" operations room formed in May, during the Syrian Army's Dawn of Idlib 1 campaign, and consists of rebel groups operating in opposition-held areas of northwestern Syria concentrated in Idlib.

The three groups comprising the coalition were Hayat Tahrir al-Sham, the Turkish-backed National Front for Liberation, and Jaysh al-Izza. In October 2020, HTS and two leading factions from the NLF began to finalize the creation of a Unified Military Council in Idlib.

In December 2024, the alliance launched an offensive which resulted in the collapse of the Assad-led government and a new transitional government led by senior figures from Hay'at Tahrir al-Sham. The new Minister of Defense, Murhaf Abu Qasra, announced that all rebel factions will be dissolved and merged into the Ministry of Defense.

== History ==
=== Start of operations ===
The rebel factions in Idlib declared the start of the "Great Conquest" operation on 7 June 2019 during the Syrian Army's Idlib offensive, as the second phase of a rebel counterattack that had begun a day prior. The first operation, "Defeating the aggression", had resulted in the rebels seizing several towns and positions.

=== First northwestern Syria offensive ===
Pro-rebel sources reported the factions hit a RuAF SU-22. On 8 June, al-Fateh al-Mubin operations room advanced into several areas north of Hama and cut the road between the town of Maharda and Skaylbia. A faction in the coalition also reportedly damaged a SyAAF Aero L-39 Albatros, forcing it to land.

On 16 June, the Syrian Observatory on Human Rights (SOHR), a UK-based monitor, reported that the factions repulsed an attack on their positions at the Tal Meleh axis.

On 18 June, the operations room carried out an attack on the Tal Meleh axis. Syrian state media reporting they halted the attack. The Syrian Army, in turn, declared the start of an operation to recapture the towns of Tal Meleh and Jubbayn 19 June. by the 20th, 89 rebels and 41 government soldiers were dead. The factions were able to repel the attack.

On 28 June 2019, the NLF carried out a raid on the town of al-Hawiz, reportedly killing 15 soldiers and injuring 30. The same day, another L-39 was hit, forcing the aircraft to land.

On 10 July 2019, the operations room captured the city of Hamamiyat and its hill. Pro-government Al-Masdar News reported that the Syrian Army recaptured the town the following day. It was reported the coalition also attacked several Syrian Army positions in areas of Latakia.

On 20 July, the operations room repelled an attack on Jubbayn.

On 21 July 2019, the operations room launched an attack on Qasabiyeh, but was repelled by the Syrian Army.

On 28 July 2019, the operations room suffered major setbacks after the Syrian Army recaptured Tal Meleh and Jubbayn, reversing all their gains. Sources reported dozens of pro-government fighters including senior generals were killed in clashes with the factions.

The Fateh Mubin operations room lost several key areas including the strategic city of Khan Shaykhun and was forced out of northern Hama. The battle ended with a ceasefire which came into effect on 31 August.

=== Second northwestern Syria offensive ===
In December 2019, after renewed airstrikes on rebel-held areas, opposition sources announced the Syrian Army was planning to restart its Idlib offensive. On 19 December, the Syrian Army began the offensive, advancing into several towns. The armed factions were also attacked from the Aleppo axis. The city of Ma'arrat al-Nu'man was captured by the Syrian Army after weeks of bombing amidst an assault on 29 January 2020. Turkey began sending convoys of troops and equipment into Idlib to safeguard against a complete takeover of the province. The Fateh Mubin operations room lost several key cities including the city of Saraqib. Following the reopening of the M5 highway to pro-government forces, the Syrian Army launched an attack on the Aleppo axis, seizing most rebel held areas of the province. On 20 February, backed by Turkish artillery, the rebels launched an attack on the town of Neirab and briefly captured the town, but withdrew after heavy clashes and airstrikes. The rebel factions attempted another advance on the Neirab axis, recapturing the town and the city of Saraqib on 27 February. On 1 March, the opposition factions also carried out a counterattack on the Al-Ghab Plain where the Syrian army had been advancing, halting the offensive there and retaking several towns. Turkish drone strikes on the SAA and allies turned the tide of the battle in favor of the rebels on several fronts. The city of Saraqib was recaptured by the SAA on 2 March 2020. 3 days later, the battle ended as a ceasefire was agreed to by Turkey and Russia.

=== Aftermath ===
On 24 June 2020, SOHR reported that the factions repelled an infiltration attempt by the Syrian Army on the Harsh Binin frontline. The Syrian army shelled rebel positions, while the Turkish Army shelled several positions of the Syrian Army in support of the rebels.

On 25 June 2020, SOHR reported that the NLF repelled an infiltration attempt by the Syrian army on the Bayanin frontline. The Turkish army shelled several positions of the Syrian Army during the clashes. The SOHR reported that the Syrian army attempted a third infiltration attempt back by artillery, but this attack was repulsed at well.

On 26 June 2020, following a conflict with the Guardians of Religion Organization, Hayat Tahrir al-Sham declared Fateh Mubin the only legal coalition in rebel-held Idlib and barred the creation of any other military operation rooms.

On 28 June 2020, SOHR reported that HTS destroyed a heavy machine gun of the Syrian Army in the al-Jaradah area.

On 29 June 2020, SOHR reported that the factions shelled several Syrian Army positions in southern Idlib. They also repelled an attempt by the Syrian army to infiltrate the al-Fterah area, and destroyed a military bulldozer on the Dadikh village frontline.

On 30 June there were reports that the Syrian Army launched an attack and captured several positions on the Ruwaiha axis. A spokesman for the NLF denied the claim.

During early July 2020, SOHR reported clashes and shelling of positions between al-Fateh al-Mubin and pro-government forces took place, as the Syrian Army sent reinforcements to the front lines in Idlib.

On 10 July 2020, SOHR reported that a Russian UAV was shot down by the NLF during fierce clashes in the Idlib countryside.

Skirmishes and clashes between the operations room and the Syrian Army continued over the course of the year, with the ceasefire agreed to in March regularly being broken with shelling and infiltration attempts.

On 20 December 2020 the operations room repelled an infiltration attempt in Jabal al-Zawiya. Shelling took place between the two sides the following day.

On 4 January 2021, the operations room clashed with the Syrian Army in the Jabal al-Zawiya area.

On 7 January 2021 three soldiers from HTS were killed by Syrian Army shelling near the village of Fateira. HTS reportedly destroyed two vehicles and killed a number of soldiers near Hantoutin village after attacking them with ATGM launchers. A Syrian soldier was shot by a sniper operating under the Fatah Mubin operations room coinciding with shelling by the latter near Dadikh village. The Syrian Army shelled rebel-held areas of Latakia governorate the same day.

On 11 January 2021, a group of Syrian Army soldiers infiltrated positions of NLF group Jaysh al-Nasr in the town of Al-Ankawi during nighttime, killing 11 fighters. The NLF responded by shelling Syrian Army positions in northwest Hama and southern Idlib countrysides.

=== Operation Deterrence of Aggression and collapse of Assad regime ===
The Military Operations Command coordinated the various Syrian opposition factions during the overthrow of the Assad regime. In January 2025, the Syrian Revolution Victory Conference officially announced the disbanding of all opposition armed groups and their integration into the Ministry of Defense.
