= 23rd Division (Syrian rebel group) =

- Arabic: الفرقة 23
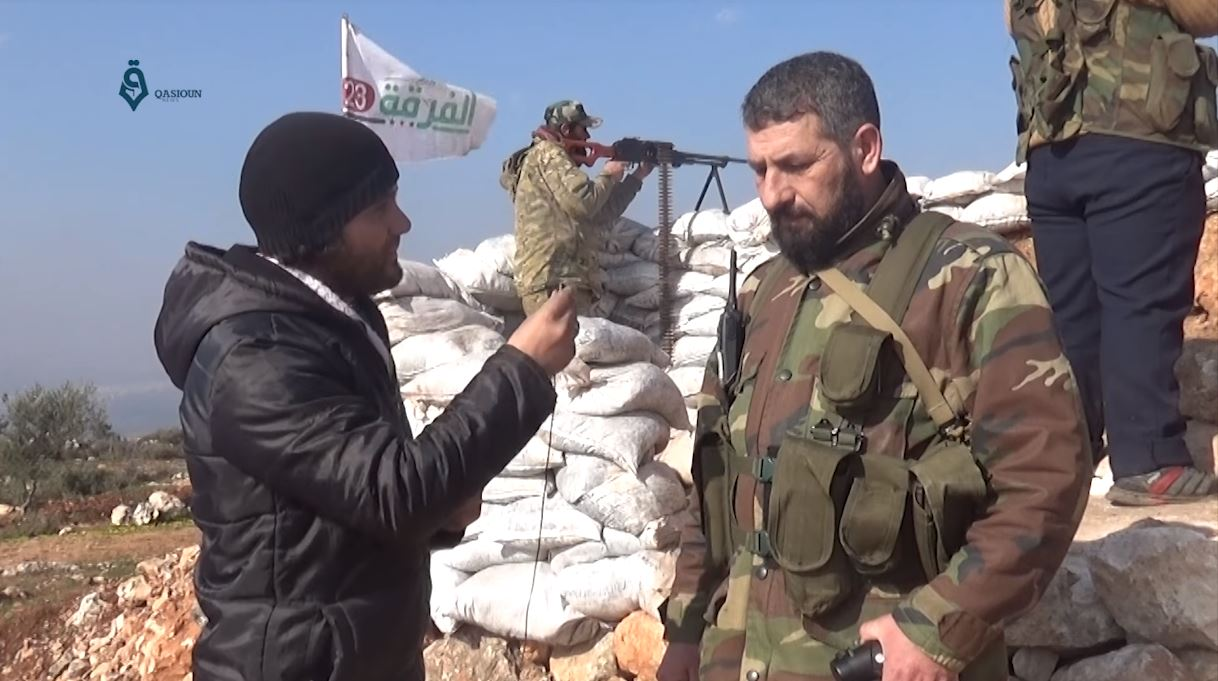
- Fighters of the 23rd Division, led by Col. Abu Mustafa, during the Turkish military operation in Afrin in February 2018. The group's flag can be seen in the background.
- Leaders: Colonel Hassan Rajoub (Abu Omar, since July 2016); Col. Abu Mustafa; Abu al-Joud al-Homsi; Former: Col. Suleyman Shalal; Khaled Saraj ("Khaled Hayani") † (2013–15); Abdul Khaliq Lahyani (resigned in July 2016)
- Dates active: 19 September 2013 – 25 July 2016 (16th Division); July 2016 – November, 2023
- Groups: Badr Martyrs' Brigade; Descendents of Omar Battalions; Lions of the Revolution Brigade; Mustafa Martyrs Brigade; Hawks of Islam Battalions; Former: Yusuf al-'Azma Brigade; Saladin Ayubi Brigade; Free Syria Brigade; Arab Spring Brigade; Al-Aqsa Brigade
- Headquarters: Khalidiya District, Aleppo (2013–16) Qah, Idlib Governorate (2016–18) Azaz and Afrin, northern Aleppo Governorate (2018–20)
- Active regions: Aleppo Governorate and northern Idlib Governorate, Syria
- Size: +1,600 (own claim in 2014)
- Part of: Syrian National Army: National Front for Liberation; Fatah Halab (2015–16)
- Wars: the Syrian Civil War

The 23rd Division (Arabic: الفرقة 23) or 16th Infantry Division (Arabic: الفرقة 16 مشاة) was a Syrian rebel group affiliated with the Free Syrian Army. Formed in September 2013, the group was active mainly in the city Aleppo and its surroundings. After rebel lines in Aleppo collapsed due to advances by the Syrian Army during the Battle of Aleppo in mid-2016, the 16th Division suffered heavy casualties and was dissolved. Remnants of the group then formed the 23rd Division (Arabic: الفرقة 23). The Syrian National Army faction of the group in northern Aleppo was disbanded after its leadership was attacked by the Levant Front in August 2020, with its other members were transferred to other groups under the SNA's 3rd Legion, while its Idlib branch continued to operate.

== History ==
=== 16th Division ===
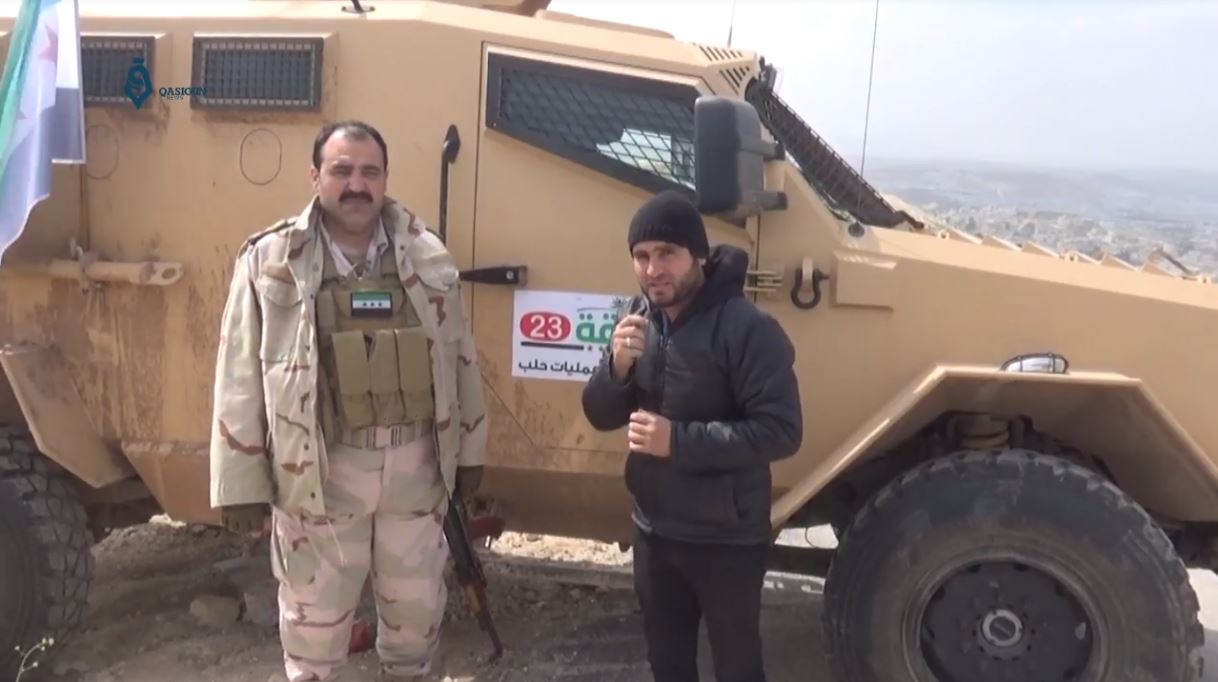
Col. Hassan Rajoub, leader of 23rd Division, during the Turkish military operation in Afrin in March 2018.

The 16th Division was formed on 19 September 2013 as a merger of 10 rebel groups in the city of Aleppo. Its main subgroup, the Badr Martyrs' Brigade, was infamous for robbery, kidnapping, extortion, and most notably mass looting of factories in Aleppo districts and shipping truckloads of looted items to Turkey.

In October 2013, the 16th Division's territory in northern Aleppo was overran by the Islamic State of Iraq and the Levant. During the ISIL offensive, ISIL fighters captured a 16th Division base and found a large quantity of gold, cash in the form of United States dollars, hashish, and gas cylinders used in the production of hell cannons used by the group. In November 2013, in response to the "aggression" on their "brothers" of ISIL by the 16th Division, the al-Aqsa Brigade defected from the 16th Division.

In February 2014, the Badr Martyrs' Brigade of the 16th Division clashed with the foreign jihadist-led Jaysh al-Muhajireen wal-Ansar over the Haritan and Mallah areas of Aleppo. An agreement was then signed on 16 February between Badr Martyrs' Brigade leader Abdul Khaliq Lahyani and Jaysh al-Muhajireen wal-Ansar representative Abu Karim al-Ukraini under the auspices of Ahrar al-Sham representative Abu Amir al-Shami, in which the two groups agreed to release their prisoners from the other party and to work together against the Syrian government, and the Badr Martyrs' Brigade agreed to not set up military headquarters in and around Mallah and to hand over houses to Jaysh al-Muhajireen wal-Ansar, while Jaysh al-Muhajireen wal-Ansar agreed for its fighters to remain in these houses and its headquarters, not to stand masked at checkpoints which were to be manned by Ahrar al-Sham and the al-Nusra Front. However, on the next day the commander of Jaysh al-Muhajireen wal-Ansar, Salahuddin al-Shishani, stated that al-Ukraini signed the agreement without consulting him and the rest of Jaysh al-Muhajireen and Ansar's leadership. Al-Shishani denounced the Badr Martyrs' Brigade as apostates "supported by the infidel West" through the Supreme Military Council, and rejected the agreement as invalid.

In January 2015, the al-Nusra Front captured 11 fighters from the 16th Division in Aleppo during the former's conflict with the Hazzm Movement. In response, the 16th Division called for the unconditional release of its fighters.

On 7 December 2015, the 16th Division and the Knights of Justice Brigade conducted a joint bombing of the Syrian government defence laboratory in the central Khalidiya district of Aleppo.

Since November 2015, the group took part in the indiscriminate shelling of Sheikh Maqsoud, which killed dozens of civilians and sparked a retaliation from the People's Protection Units (YPG), which killed several of its members in April 2016.

During the northern Aleppo offensive (June-July 2016), the 16th Division suffered heavy casualties, including 29 killed, more than 54 wounded, and 7 missing, its headquarter overran, and its commanders, including the top leader, Abdul Khaliq Lahyani, resigned and was relieved of all duties. A new commander, former Syrian Air Force Colonel Hassan Rajoub, was appointed. Subsequently, the group went defunct.

=== 23rd Division ===
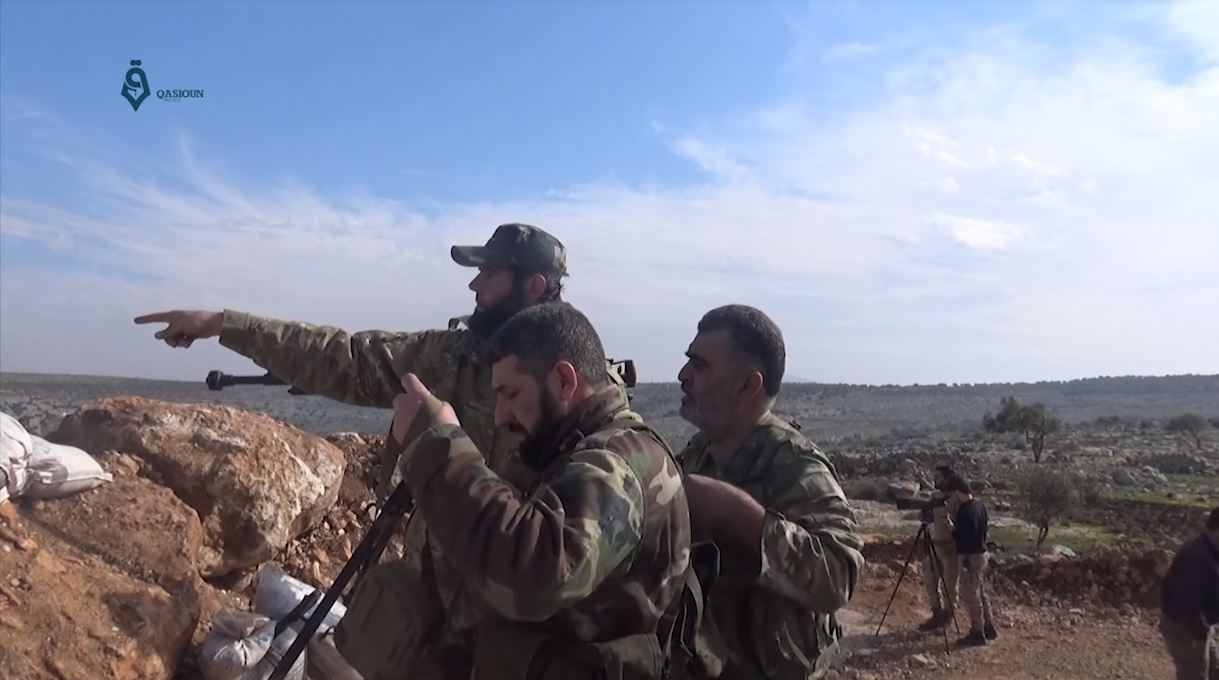
23rd Division fighters during the Turkish military operation in Afrin in February 2018.

Following the 16th Division's dissolution in July 2016, remnants of the group, led by Col. Hassan Rajoub, regrouped and formed the 23rd Division.

Since January 2018, the group have participated in the Turkish military operation in Afrin against the YPG-led Syrian Democratic Forces in the Afrin Region. On 28 February, Tahrir al-Sham besieged the headquarters of the 23rd Division in the village of Qah in the northern Idlib Governorate. After less than an hour of clashes, Tahrir al-Sham fighters captured the headquarter and seized equipment and weapons.

In May 2018, along with 10 other rebel groups in northwestern Syria, the 23rd Division formed the National Front for Liberation, which was officially announced on 28 May.

By 2020, most of the 23rd Division's fighters came from Tell Rifaat in the northern Aleppo Governorate. On 8 August 2020, the Levant Front, which accused the 23rd Division of "inciting hatred and strife, abetting infighting, and comprising corrupt officials", stormed the group's headquarters Azaz and Afrin, taking over the 23rd Division's bases and capturing its leaders and their escorts. The 3rd Legion of the Syrian National Army, led by the Levant Front, then made a court decision ordering the disbandment of the 23rd Division and the transfer of its members who were not arrested during the attack to other groups within the legion.

In November of 2023, the 23rd division's Idlib-based branch was announced to be merging with the Free Idlib Army as 60th Infantry Division by the National Front for Liberation.

At the Syrian Revolution Victory Conference, which was held on 29 January 2025, most factions of the armed opposition, including the Syrian National Army and its components, announced their dissolution and were incorporated into the newly formed Ministry of Defense.

== War crimes ==
According to the Syrian Observatory for Human Rights, the 16th Division's Badr Martyrs Brigade, led by Khaled Hayani, was responsible for the deaths of more than 203 civilians, including 42 children, at least 25 women, and 136 men, with more than 900 wounded, 175 of them seriously, in the city of Aleppo between July and December 2014 with hell cannons and other mortars, in addition to improvised explosive devices.
