= National Front for Liberation =

Syrian rebel coalition

- الجبهة الوطنية للتحرير
- Flag of the National Front for Liberation Logo of the National Front for Liberation
- Leaders: Since July 2018: Col. Fadlallah al-Haji (commander-in-chief and Sham Legion); Ahmad Sarhan ("Abu Satif") (first deputy, unclear factional alignment since late 2023); Walid al-Mushayil ("Abu Hashim") (second deputy, unclear factional alignment since July merger); Anad al-Darwish ("Abu al-Munathir") (chief of staff and Ahrar al-Sham); Maj. Muhammad Mansour (deputy chief of staff and Jaysh al-Nasr); May–July 2018: Col. Fadlallah al-Haji (commander-in-chief and Sham Legion); Lt. Col. Suhaib Leoush (deputy commander and Free Idlib Army); Maj. Muhammad Mansour (chief of staff and Jaysh al-Nasr)
- Dates active: 28 May 2018 – 29 January 2025
- Allegiance: (Syrian opposition) Syrian Interim Government (2018–2025)
- Active regions: Northwestern Syria: Idlib Governorate; Hama Governorate; Aleppo Governorate; Latakia Governorate
- Status: Merged into the Syrian Armed Forces
- Size: 10,000-30,000 (May 2018); 45,000-70,000 (July 2018); 40,000 (2025)
- Part of: (Syrian opposition) Free Syrian Army (May-June, 2018); Syrian National Army (since October 2019); Unified Military Council (Idlib); Military Operations Command
- Wars: the Syrian Civil War
- Website: https://twitter.com/alwataniatahrer

The National Front for Liberation (Arabic: الجبهة الوطنية للتحرير, Al-Jabhat al-Wataniya lil-Tahrir) was a Syrian rebel coalition that was part of the Syrian National Army (SNA) fighting in the Syrian Civil War. The group was formed by 11 rebel factions in northwestern Syria in May 2018, and was officially announced on 28 May 2018. The formation receives major support from Turkey. The group joined the SNA on 4 October 2019.

At the event on 29 January declaring the victory of the Syrian revolution, most factions of the armed opposition, including the Syrian National Army, which the NFL was part of, announced their pending dissolution. Around 40,000 fighters of the National Front for Liberation were incorporated into the newly formed Ministry of Defense.

== Commanders ==
From 28 May to 1 July 2018, Colonel Fadlallah al-Haji of the Sham Legion was the group's overall commander, Lieutenant Colonel Suhaib Leoush of the Free Idlib Army was its deputy commander, and Major Muhammad Mansour of the Army of Victory was its chief of staff.

On 1 July, Ahmad Sarhan ("Abu Satif") of the Suqour al-Sham Brigades and Walid al-Mushayil ("Abu Hashim") of Jaysh al-Ahrar were named as the group's new first and second deputy commanders, respectively, while Walid al-Mushayil ("Abu Hashim") of Ahrar al-Sham was appointed chief of staff.

== History ==
=== 2018 ===
On 1 July, the Syrian Liberation Front, which was formed by Ahrar al-Sham and the Nour al-Din al-Zenki Movement in February 2018, as well as Jaysh al-Ahrar and the Damascus Gathering, joined the formation.

On 5 August, the NFL arrested 45 people accused of attempting to reconcile with the Syrian government in al-Ghab Plain and Mount Shashabo in the western Hama countryside. On 13 August, the crackdown campaign was expanded to Maarat al-Nu'man and Ariha.

On 9 August, the NFL's Sham Legion launched an attack on a People's Protection Units (YPG) cell in the southeastern Afrin countryside, killing four YPG fighters and capturing small arms and ammunition.

On 14 August, the group released a video showing the training of its self-proclaimed "Unit 82 SWAT Forces". On the same day, a group of around 200 fighters formed the Free Hayan Brigade and joined the NFL in order to "unite factions", "fight forces of the Syrian regime", and avoid rebel infighting. The next day, the Free North Brigade, which operates around the same area, also joined the NFL. On 27 August, the Imam Ali Battalion joined the Free North Brigade.

=== 2019 ===
In January 2019, following defeat at the hands of Hayat Tahrir al-Sham, Nour al-Zenki left Idlib for the north, leaving the NFL.

On 26 March 2019, the National Front for Liberation released a statement declaring its rejection and condemnation of the United States recognition of the Golan Heights as part of Israel.

During the Syrian military’s Northwestern Syria offensive (April 2019–present) against rebel-held territory, the NFL cooperated with Hayat Tahrir al-Sham (HTS) in the battle over Kfar Nabuda in Idlib, May 2019. It also cooperated with the Army of Glory, and other rebel groups to counter the offensive.

It merged with the SNA in October 2019. According to Middle East Eye, neither the NFL nor SNA fighters had been informed of the merger, which was announced at a press conference in Urfa, southern Turkey.

On 9 October 2019, 500 fighters from the Army of Glory, including its deputy commander-in-chief Captain Manaf Maarati and spokesman Captain Mustafa Maarati, reportedly defected to the NFL.

=== 2020 ===
On 15 March 2020, Step News Agency reported that Fadlallah al-Haji had resigned from his position on the orders of the Turkish government. The move came after the discovery of a large-scale embezzlement involving the Sham Legion and other groups within the NFL who misrepresented the amount of fighters within their ranks in order to receive extra salaries from their Turkish ally. Turkey requested the NFL to prepare between 2,000 and 3,000 fighters to prepare for a Turkish Armed Forces-led military offensive against the Syrian Armed Forces in the western Aleppo Governorate in the event of the Russia–Turkey ceasefire breaking down, but the NFL only equipped 350 fighters after submitting 14,000 fake names to Turkey. However, Enab Baladi contacted Captain Naji Mustafa, who denied that al-Haji had resigned, and al-Haji continues to serve as the commander-in-chief of the NFL.

=== 2024 ===
In November 2024, the National Front for Liberation joined in on the HTS-led Operation Deterrence of Aggression, launching a coordinated assault on regime positions in northwestern Syria. During the 2024 Battle of Aleppo, NFL fighters played a key role in helping to take control of city alongside other rebel factions. within less than two weeks, the combined efforts of the Deterrence of Aggression factions and southern rebel groups ultimately led to the swift collapse of the Assad regime by December of 2024.

In late January 2025, the NFL participated in the Syrian Victory Conference, held in Damascus to chart the country’s post-war future. The group, alongside the rest of the Syrian National Army and other rebel groups, agreed to formally dissolve and integrate into the newly established Ministry of Defense under the new Syrian Transitional Government.

== Member groups ==
- Sham Legion
- Ahrar al-Sham
- Jaysh al-Ahrar
- Jaysh al-Nasr
- Jaysh al-Nukhba
- Jaysh al-Thani
- 1st Infantry Division
- Freedom Brigade
- Damascus Gathering
  - Hamza ibn Abdul Muttalib Battalions
  - Brigades and Battalions to Unite the Capital
  - Miqdad ibn Amr Brigade
- Free Hayan Brigade
- Liwa Ahrar al-Sham
- Central Division
- Levant Revolutionaries Battalions
- 60th Infantry Division (merger of the Free Idlib Army and 23rd Division)
- Coastal Division (merger of the 1st Coastal Division and the 2nd Coastal Division)
- Suqour al-Sham-40th Division (offshoot of the Suqour al-Sham Brigades)

== Former groups ==
- Martyrs of Islam Brigade (joined the Sham legion in June, 2018)
- Nour al-Din al-Zenki Movement (left in 2019)
- Free Idlib Army (dissolved in 2023)
- 23rd Division (dissolved in 2023)
- 1st Coastal Division (dissolved in 2023)
- 2nd Coastal Division (dissolved in 2023)
- Suqour al-Sham Brigades (left in 2023)

== See also ==
- 5th Corps (Syrian rebel group)
- Syrian Front for Liberation
- Syrian Revolutionary Command Council
- Syrian Islamic Liberation Front
- National Front for Liberation–Tahrir al-Sham conflict
