= Jaysh al-Nukhba =

Syrian Rebel Group

- جيش النخبة; Elite Army
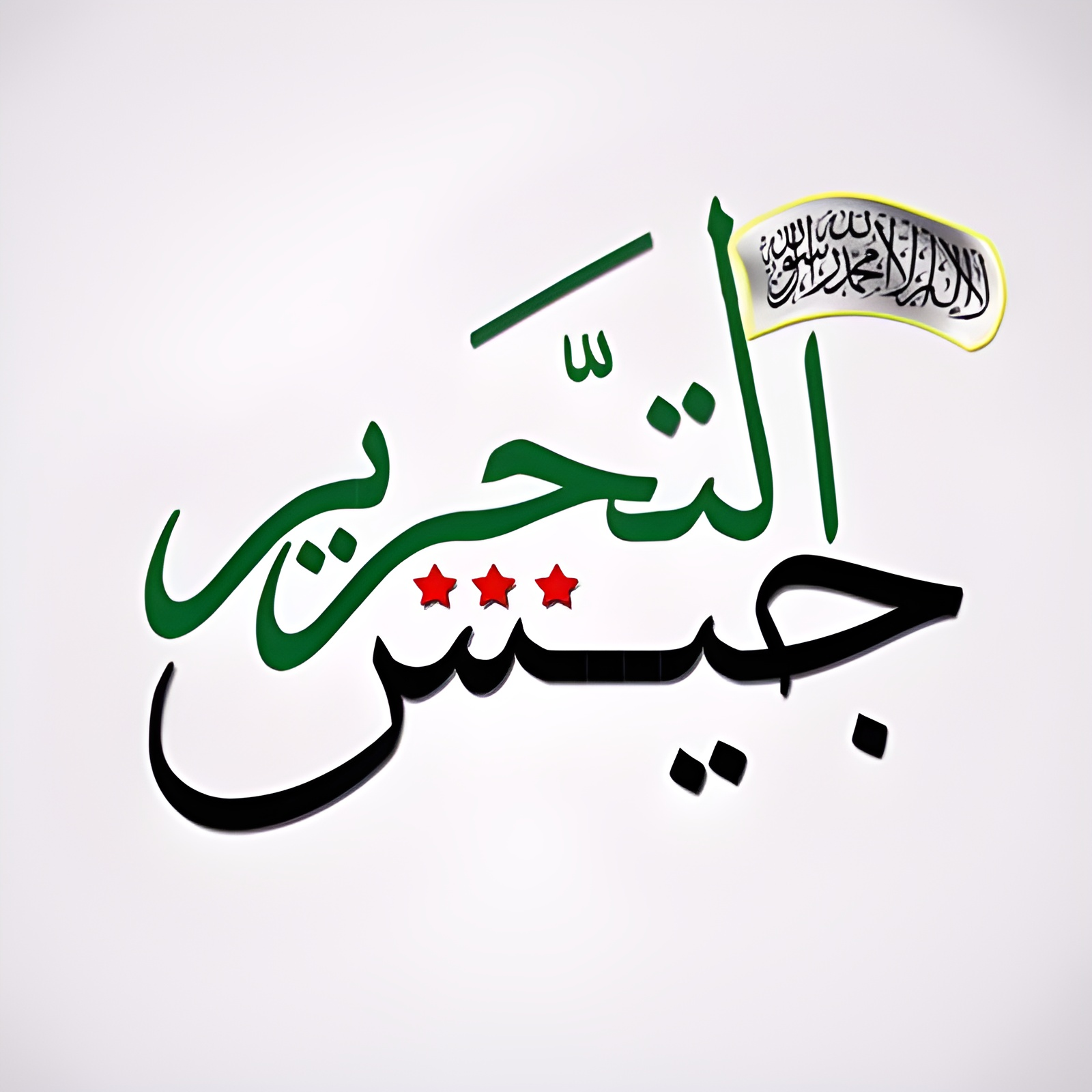
- Former logo of the Liberation Army
- Leaders: Mohammed al-Ghabi (DOW); Alaa Abdel Hay al-Ahmad; Raed al-Elewi; Mohammed Ahmed al-Sayed (artillery regiment and overall commander since January 2017); Zakaria al-Ahmad (media office director)
- Dates active: 24 February 2016 – 29 January 2025
- Groups: Jabhat al-Sham; 9th Brigade; Al Haq Companies; 115th Brigade; Elite Battalion; Former: 46th Division; 312th Division; 314th Division
- Headquarters: Jarabulus, Aleppo Governorate, Syria; Kafr Nabl, Idlib Governorate, Syria
- Active regions: Northwestern Syria: Aleppo Governorate; Idlib Governorate; Hama Governorate; Latakia Governorate
- Size: 4,000 (2016); 3,000 (self-claimed in 2017)
- Part of: (Syrian opposition) Free Syrian Army: (Syrian opposition) Syrian National Army; National Front for Liberation (since May 2018); Hawar Kilis Operations Room; Fatah Halab (2016)
- Wars: the Syrian Civil War

The Jaysh al-Nukhba (Arabic: جيش النخبة; lit. 'Elite Army'), formerly called the Liberation Army (Arabic: جيش التحرير, romanized: Jaysh al-Tahrir) was a group operating in the Hama and Aleppo Governorates, backed and supported by Turkey. The group was formed from five units, some of which received BGM-71 TOW missiles from the United States.

== History ==
=== Liberation Army ===
In July 2016 the al-Nusra Front raided the Liberation Army's headquarters in Kafr Nabl and captured 40 fighters, including the group's commander, Mohammed al-Ghabi. They also seized a number of weapons.

Around 5 months after the groups formation, internal disputes led to the 46th, 312th, and 314th Divisions leaving the Army of Liberation to form a new group called the 2nd Army.

The group participated in the Turkish military intervention in Syria which began with the capture of Jarabulus. Liberation Army fighters captured the village of Amarnah from the Syrian Democratic Forces and took more than 8 SDF fighters captive. Since October 2016, the Liberation Army operates a prisoner-of-war camp in the northern Aleppo Governorate, which holds around 300 prisoners of war from the Islamic State of Iraq and the Levant, implementing Sharia and capital punishment. On 15 October, Mohammed al-Ghabi was severely injured by an ISIL car bombs and died 20 days later. A new commander was named on 10 November.

=== Elite Army ===
On 7 January 2017, the Liberation Army announced that it has changed its name to the Elite Army and a new commander was appointed.

In May 2018, along with 10 other rebel groups in northwestern Syria, the Elite Army formed the National Front for Liberation, which was officially announced on 28 May.

In September 2021 one of the group members kidnapped a 16 year old girl just as she was released from a prison (converted from "the former Asayish Center" post Turkish occupation) on 23 May 2020. She was taken to the Idlib Governorate where she stated that he enslaved her similar to ISIS has done previously.

At the Syrian Revolution Victory Conference, which was held on 29 January 2025, as part of the Syrian National Army, including the Jaysh al-Nukhba, announced its dissolution and were incorporated into the newly formed Ministry of Defense.
