= Battle of Aleppo (2012–2016) =

Military confrontation in Aleppo (2012–2016)

Battle of Aleppo مَعْرَكَةُ حَلَبَ
- Part of the Syrian civil war
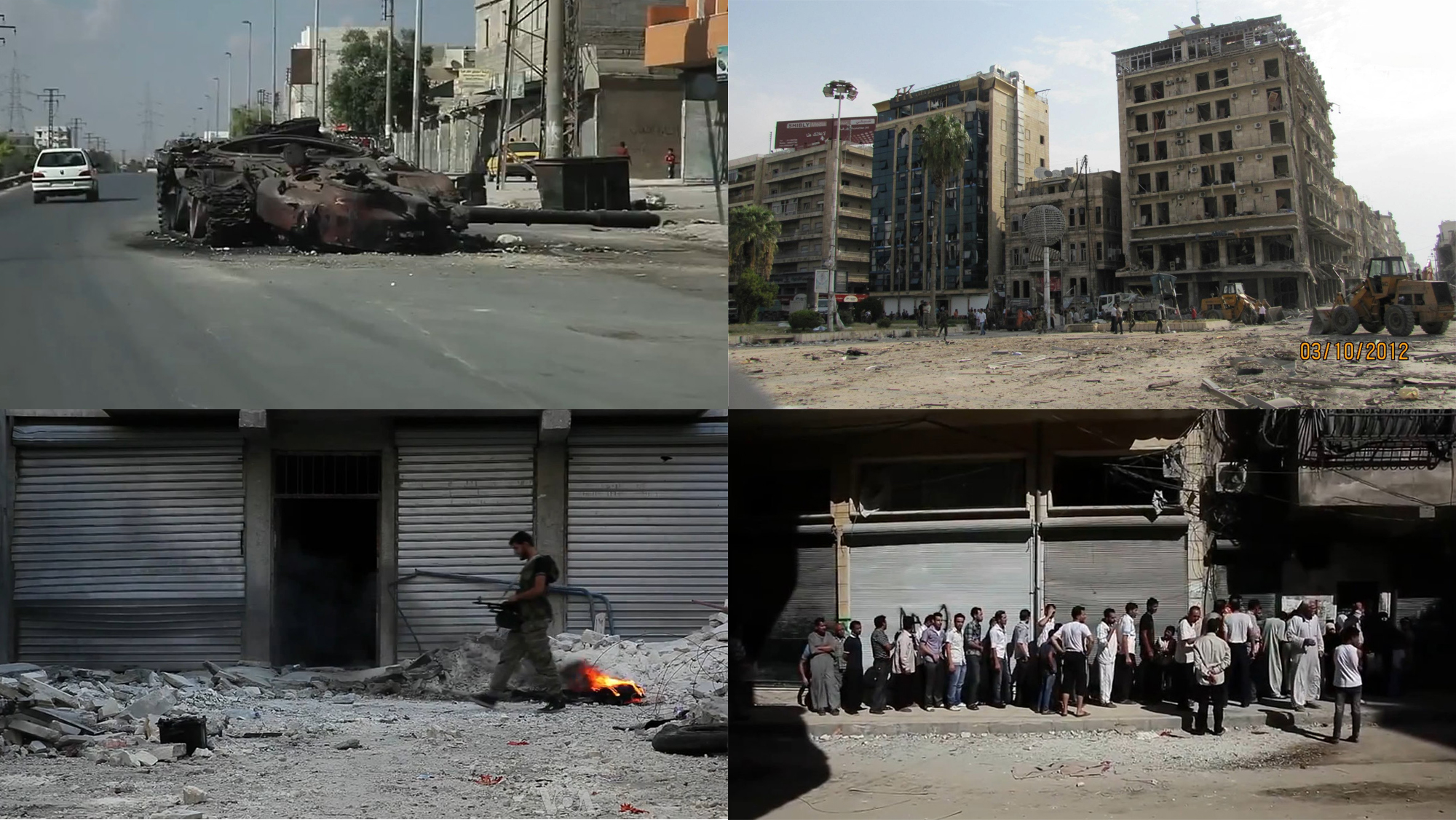
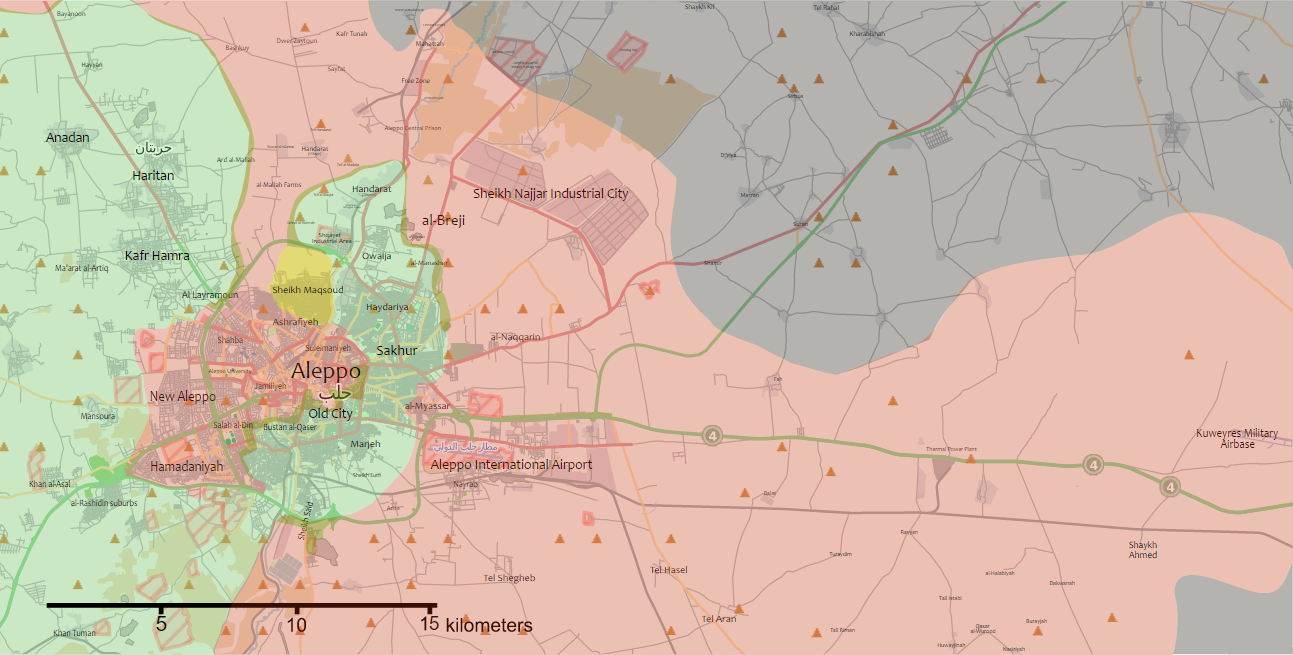
- Clockwise from top-left: A destroyed tank in Aleppo, the Saadallah al-Jabiri Square buildings after the October 2012 Aleppo bombings, residents of Aleppo wait in line for aid relief, and a Free Syrian Army fighter walking among rubble in Aleppo; Bottom: The situation in Aleppo on 20 August 2016, when both the rebels and Syrian Government forces besieged each other Map Legend: Syrian Arab Army control Opposition control (including al-Nusra Front) SDF control Islamic State of Iraq and the Levant control Joint SAA-SDF control Confrontation or unclear situation
Date	19 July 2012 – 22 December 2016 (4 years, 5 months and 3 days)
Location	Aleppo, Aleppo Governorate, Syria 36.216667°N 37.166667°E
Result	Syrian Arab Army and allied victory: City divided between a government-held west and rebel-held east, with two northern districts YPG-held, from July 2012 to November 2016; UNESCO World heritage site Ancient City of Aleppo largely damaged in the fighting; In December 2016, pro-government forces gained control of all of the formerly rebel-held east; The YPG controls Kurdish-majority Sheikh Maqsoud

Belligerents
Ba'athist Syria; Iran (2013–); Russia (Sep 2015–); Allied militias: Liwa al-Quds (2013–); Hezbollah (2013–); (Iraq) Iraqi Shia militias (2013–); Liwa Fatemiyoun; Liwa Zainabiyoun; Ba'ath Brigades; SSNP (2013–); Syrian Resistance	Fatah Halab (2015–2016); Jaysh Halab (Dec 2016); Army of Conquest (mid-2016–); Ansar al-Sharia (2015–2016)	YPG^{[a]} YPJ; Army of Revolutionaries	Islamic State (2013–2014)

Commanders and leaders
(Ba'athist Syria) Ali Abdullah Ayyoub; (Ba'athist Syria) Suhayl al-Hasan; Qasem Soleimani; Viktor Bondarev; Alexander Zhuravlyov; (Ba'athist Syria) Maher al-Assad; (Ba'athist Syria) Mohammed Akkad; Militia commanders: Ali Reza Tavassoli; Saqib Haider Karbalai; KIA: (Syria) Abbas Samii †; Jabbar Drisawi †; Zaino Berri (executed); Hossein Hamadani †; Mohammad Rafi †	Abdul Jabbar al-Oqaidi (2013); Taufik Shiabuddin; KIA: (Syrian opposition) Abdul Qader Saleh † (al-Tawhid Brigade top commander); (Syrian opposition) Yusef al-Jader † (al-Tawhid Brigade); (Syrian opposition) Yussef Al-Abbas † (al-Tawhid Brigade); Khaled Hayani † (16th Division); Abu Khalid al-Suri † (Islamic Front); Abdulrahman al-Salameh † (Al-Nusra Front); Nasif Ismail † (Harakat Nour al-Din al-Zenki)	Zoran Birhat; Sharvan Efrin; Nujin Derik; Sewsen Bîrhat; KIA: Yusuf Kahia †	Unknown

Units involved
Syrian Arab Armed Forces Units involved: Syrian Arab Army; 4th Mechanized Division; Republican Guard; Syrian Marines; 4th Armoured Division; 5th Mechanized Division; 17th Division (Reserve); 46th Special Forces (Airborne) Regiment; 80th Army Brigade; 25th Special Mission Forces Division; Desert Hawks Brigade; 629th Battalion; National Defense Forces; Shabiha (2011–2012); Berri clan militias; Local Defence Forces; Baqir Brigade; Military Intelligence Directorate; Military Security Shield Forces; Forces of the Fighters of the Tribes; Syrian Arab Air Force; Ministry of Interior; Public Security Police; Syrian Special Mission Forces; Islamic Republic of Iran Armed Forces Units involved: IRGC; Quds Force; IRGC Ground Forces; Basij; Iranian Army; Russian Armed Forces Support: Russian Air Force; Russian Navy; Russian Ground Forces; Special Operations Forces advisors (Oct–Dec 2016); Iraqi Shia militias Units involved: Harakat Hezbollah al-Nujaba; Ammar Yasser Brigade; Asa'ib Ahl al-Haq; Kata'ib al-Imam Ali; Harakat al-Abdal; Kata'ib Dir' al-Wilaya; Kata'ib Hezbollah; Badr Organisation; Hezbollah Units involved: Syrian Hezbollah units; Junud al-Mahdi; Imam al Hujja Regiment	Fatah Halab; Ahrar al-Sham; Al-Tawhid Brigade (2012–14) (Note: Even though the Al-Tawhid Brigade mostly disintegrated in 2014, remnants of the group remained active in Aleppo until 2016.); Sham Falcons; Army of Islam; Nour al-Din al-Zenki Movement; Truth Brigade; Free Idlib Army; Fastaqim Union; Levant Front; Army of Mujahideen; Syrian Turkmen Brigades; Karm al-Jabal Martyrs Battalion; Al-Nusra Front; Liwa al-Muhajireen wal-Ansar; Ansar al-Din Front (since mid-2014); Harakat Fajr ash-Sham al-Islamiya; Harakat Sham al-Islam; Turkistan Islamic Party in Syria; Ajnad al-Kavkaz; Movement of Salah al-Din the Kurd; Ansar al-Aqida	Army of Revolutionaries; Kurdish Front; (Syrian opposition) Northern Democratic Brigade	Military of the Islamic State

Strength
20,000 SAA soldiers (2012); 1,500 NDF fighters; 2,000–4,000 Lebanese Hezbollah fighters; 4,000 Iraqi Hezbollah fighters	15,000 fighters (2012); 2,500 al-Nusra fighters; c. 8,000 fighters (mid-2016); 1,000 al-Nusra fighters	Unknown	Unknown

Casualties and losses
15,000+ killed	10,000+ killed	1,500+ killed	Unknown
- 31,273 overall deaths (in the whole province; including 21,452 civilians)
- ^{a} The YPG was neutral at the start of the battle in 2012, semi-allied with the rebels 2012–2014, neutral 2015–2016, and semi-allied with the Syrian Army during the final offensive in late 2016 (see November–December 2016 Aleppo offensive).
- The location of Aleppo within Syria

The Battle of Aleppo (Arabic: مَعْرَكَةُ حَلَبَ, romanized: Maʿrakat Ḥalab) was a major military confrontation in Aleppo, the largest city in Syria by urban area, between the Syrian opposition militias (such as the Free Syrian Army (FSA), the Levant Front and Al-Nusra Front) against the Ba'athist Syrian government and army, supported by Russia, Iran, Hezbollah and other Shia militant groups backed by the IRGC, and other pro-government Syrian and Palestinian militias, and against the Kurdish-majority People's Protection Units (YPG). The battle began on 19 July 2012 and was part of the Syrian civil war. A stalemate that had been in place for four years finally ended in July 2016, when Ba'athist government troops closed the rebels' last supply line into Aleppo with the support of Russian airstrikes. In response, rebel forces launched unsuccessful counteroffensives in September and October that failed to break the government's siege of the rebel-held eastern half of the city; in November, government forces, allied with Russia and bolstered by YPG forces, embarked on a decisive campaign that resulted in the recapture of all of Aleppo by December 2016. The Syrian government victory was widely seen as a turning point in the civil war.

The large-scale devastation of the battle and its importance led combatants to name it the "mother of battles" or "Syria's Stalingrad". The battle was marked by widespread violence against civilians, repeated targeting of hospitals and schools (mostly by pro-government air forces but also to a lesser extent by the rebels), as well as indiscriminate bombardment and shelling of civilian areas from all sides. It was also marked by the inability of the international community to resolve the conflict peacefully. The UN special envoy to Syria proposed to end the battle by giving rebel-held East Aleppo autonomy, but this was rejected by the Assad government. Hundreds of thousands of residents were displaced both internally and externally by the battle and efforts to provide aid to civilians or to facilitate evacuation were routinely disrupted by continued combat and mistrust between the opposing sides.

All parties to the battle have been widely condemned by the UN and human rights organizations for engaging in atrocities and violations of international humanitarian law. Pro-Assad forces and their allies engaged in indiscriminate aerial bombardment of residential neighborhoods, including systemically dropping barrel bombs and cluster munitions, as well as conducting "double-tap" airstrikes on civilians and rescue workers—a tactic mostly attributed to Russian aviation. Simultaneously, rebel factions indiscriminately targeted civilian areas with rocket and mortar attacks, including with improvised artillery that fired repurposed gas-canister mortars (or "hell cannons") conducted suicide car bombings, and were accused of using human shields by forcibly preventing civilians from leaving areas they controlled. Both government and opposition factions were accused of using chemical weapons executing forced displacement, engaging in torture and summary executions of civilians and POWs, and weaponizing starvation as a tactic of war by blockading food, medicine and other essentials from civilian populations at different points during the battle. Across front lines, government forces, opposition militias and the SDF were all implicated in sniper fire targeting civilians. Following the 2016 Ba'athist government offensive in Aleppo, the UN High Commissioner for Human Rights described the bombardments and devastating siege of East Aleppo as "crimes of historic proportions".

After four years of fighting, the battle was one of the bloodiest battles of the Syrian Civil War, leaving over 31,000 people dead in the city and the rest of the province, almost a tenth of the estimated overall war casualties at that time. The siege also resulted in the severe destruction of the Old City of Aleppo, a UNESCO World Heritage Site. An estimated 33,500 buildings have been either damaged or destroyed. It is considered one of the worst urban battles fought in the 21st century, due to its length and destruction.

== Background ==
In 2011, Aleppo was Syria's largest city, with a population of 2.5 million people. A UNESCO World Heritage Site, it has been described by Time as Syria's commercial capital. Author Diana Darke has written that "The city has long been multi-cultural, a complex mix of Kurds, Iranians, Turkmen, Armenians and Circassians overlaid on an Arab base in which multi-denominational churches and mosques still share the space."

Nationwide protests against President Bashar al-Assad began on 15 March 2011, as part of the Arab Spring. Anti-government protests were held in Aleppo in August 2011, including the city's Sakhour district. Local activists reported two protesters were killed by security forces during a raid in Sakhour neighborhood. However, anti-government protests in Aleppo were widely characterized as rare and small during this period, as most of the city remained undisturbed and supportive of the Syrian government. Throughout 2011, large government-organized rallies in support of Assad also occurred. On 11 October 2011, a large rally in support of Bashar al-Assad was held in Saadallah al-Jabiri Square. According to Syrian state media, more than 1.5 million attended the rally, and it was among the largest held in Syria.

More regular protests only began in Aleppo in the spring of 2012, including demonstrations organized by students at the University of Aleppo in May 2012. Student activists were reportedly attacked by security forces and violently clashed with pro-government students. However, Aleppo retained considerable government support throughout much of 2012, until 19 July 2012, when rebel fighters from the northern countryside violently penetrated into the city, joining with rebels operating in the city's south, to which the government responded with heavy-handed bombardments.

On 16 February 2012, the UN General Assembly issued a resolution with a vote of 137 in favour, 12 against, and 17 abstentions, and called on Syria "to immediately put an end to all human rights violations and attacks against civilians."

== Combatants ==
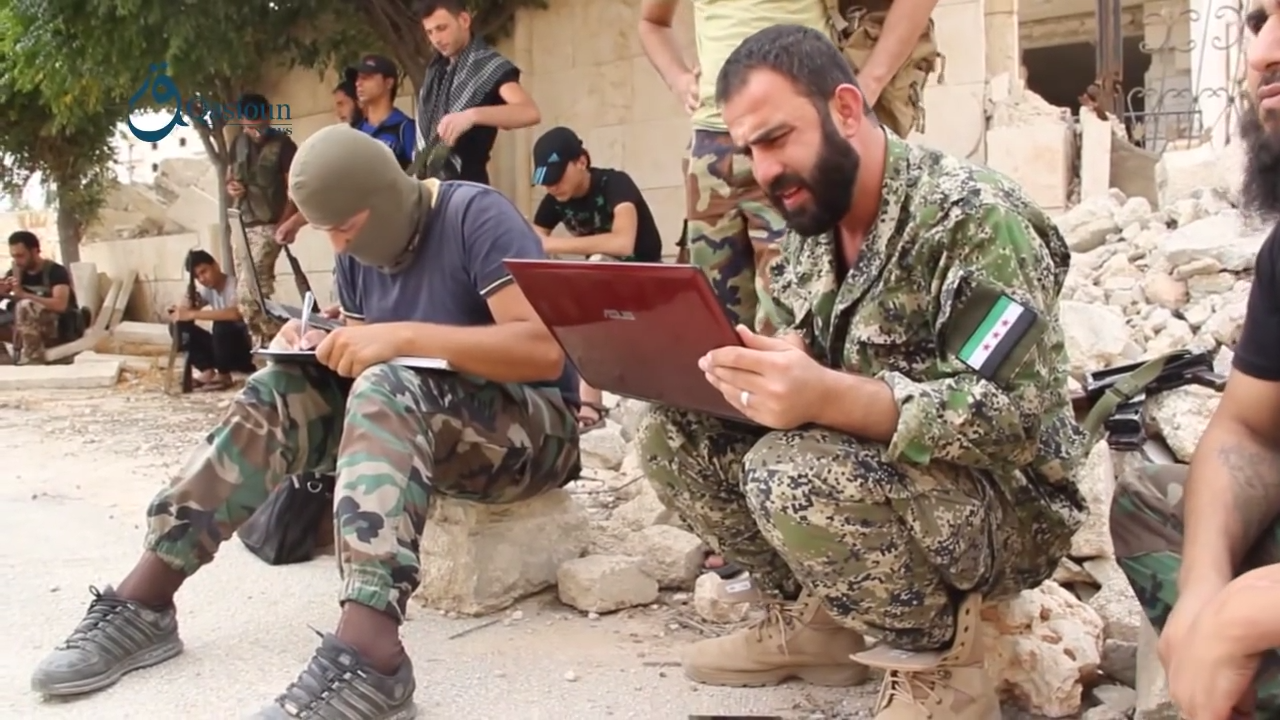
Major Yasser Abdul Rahim, commander of Fatah Halab and field commander of the Sham Legion in Aleppo, coordinates an attack on YPG positions in Aleppo, 2 October 2015.

At the beginning of the Battle of Aleppo, rebels reportedly had between 6,000 and 7,000 fighters in 18 battalions. The largest rebel group was the Islamist Al-Tawhid Brigade—a brigade in the overarching umbrella movement of the Free Syrian Army, which was initially composed of army defectors. Most of Aleppo's rebels however, came from the northern Aleppo countryside, from rural towns such as Al-Bab, Mare', Azaz, Tel Rifaat and Anadan. On 19 November 2012, the rebel fighters—particularly Al-Tawhid Brigade and Al-Nusra Front—initially rejected the newly formed Syrian National Coalition. However, the next day the rebels withdrew their rejection.

Residents of Aleppo reportedly accused the rebels of using civilian homes for shelter. By December, the various rebel brigades were commonly looting for supplies; they often switched their loyalties to groups that had more to share. This new approach led to the killing of at least one rebel commander following a dispute; fighters retreating with their loot caused the loss of a frontline position and the failure of an attack on a Kurdish neighborhood. The common rebel practice of looting and occupation of civilian houses cost the rebel fighters much popular support, and even led some civilians to support President Assad.

Islamic extremists and foreign fighters, many of whom were experienced and came from the ongoing insurgency in neighboring Iraq, also joined the battle. Jihadists reportedly came from across the Muslim world. Jacques Bérès, a French surgeon who treated wounded fighters, reported a significant number of foreign fighters, most of whom had Islamist goals and were not directly interested in Bashar al-Assad. They included Libyans, Chechens and Frenchmen. Bérès contrasted the situation in Aleppo with that in Idlib and Homs, where foreign forces were not as common. Some FSA brigades cooperated with Mujahideen fighters. By 2016, the rebel factions still included internationally recognized terrorist groups such as Al-Nusra Front; they numbered 1,000 fighters in October 2016.

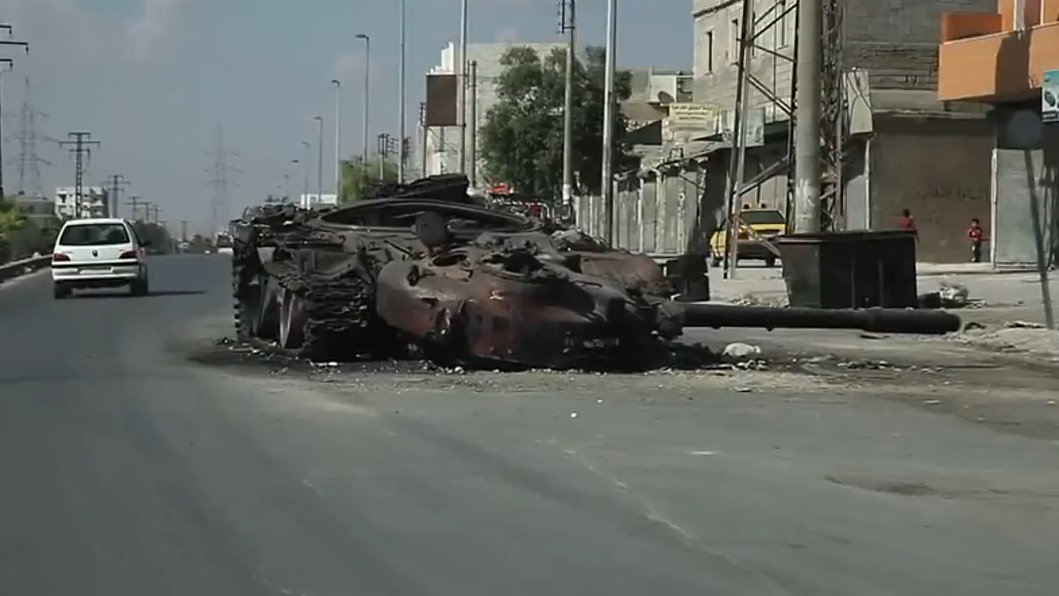
A destroyed government tank on a road in Aleppo

The Shiite militant group Hezbollah, which by April 2013 joined the Syrian Civil War in support for President al-Assad, also took part in the battle starting in June 2013, and was also designated as a terrorist group by some international organizations and states. They were joined later by other Shiite militias backed by the IRGC from Iraq, Pakistan, Afghanistan, and the Syrian Shiite villages of Nubl and Zahraa in the northern Aleppo countryside, particularly in the latter part of the battle.

The Syrian government and army also had many Sunni fighters fighting alongside it, complicating the sectarian narrative for the conflict. These include auxiliary and tribal militias recruited into the National Defense Forces (NDF) and the Local Defense Forces (LDF), a phenomenon unique to Aleppo, whose fighters were recruited from both the city and rural towns in Aleppo's southern countryside, such as the Liwa al-Baqir from the Baggara tribe, which maintained close relations with Iran, despite being Sunni. Other primarily Sunni militias include the Palestinian Liwa al-Quds, recruited from the Handarat and Neirab refugee camps, as well as the nominally secular Ba'ath Brigades, which were founded in Aleppo by the regional branch of the Arab Socialist Ba'ath party whose membership was also mostly Sunni. The Ba'ath Brigades and Liwa al-Quds both had thousands members each at their height, and spearheaded key battles and frontlines in the city.

The government retained much of its support in Aleppo during the initial battle; in August 2012 a rebel commander was quoted by The Guardian as saying "around 70% of Aleppo city is with the regime". As the fighting dragged on however, Assad lost support from much of Aleppo's wealthy class. In October 2012, CBS News reported that 48 elite businessmen who were the primary financiers for the government switched sides to finance the rebels. By March 2013, with the reported help of some of these businessmen, "some 1,000 factories" in Aleppo were reportedly looted, their machinery, goods and other equipment transferred to Turkey "with the full knowledge and facilitation of the Turkish government". In January 2013, the head of Aleppo's Chamber of Industry Fares Shehabi accused rebels of collaborating with Turkey in stripping Aleppo's factories of their equipment. The industry body filed a lawsuit in March 2013 accusing the Turkish government of systemically "looting" Syrian industry.

Aleppo was the first time the Syrian Arab Army engaged in urban warfare. They divided their forces into groups of 40 soldiers each, armed mostly with automatic rifles, anti-tank rockets and artillery; tanks and helicopters were only used for support. In August 2012, the army deployed its elite units. After rebel forces executed Zeino al-Berri, tribal leader of Al-Berri tribe in the same month, the Berri tribe joined the fight against the rebels.

Initially, Aleppo's Christian community tried to avoid taking sides in the conflict. However, many Christians supported the Army and some formed militias aligned with the government following the capture of their quarters by the Syrian Army. Many Christian Armenians also supported the Syrian Army. Some of Aleppo's Armenians claimed Turkey supported the FSA to attack Armenians and Arab Christians. In 2012, one Armenian militia had around 150 fighters.

At the beginning of the battle, Aleppo's Kurds formed armed groups, most notably the Saladin Ayubi Brigade, which worked with the opposition. Units of the Kurdish Front, part of the FSA and allied with the Democratic Union Party (PYD), were formed later in 2013. The PYD had poor relations with both sides. Its armed wing, People's Protection Units (YPG) opted for neutrality, stayed out of Arab areas and insisted the FSA stay out of the Kurdish area. They did not initially fight the Syrian Army unless attacked. The Kurdish areas in Aleppo mainly came under PYD control. At various points earlier on in the conflict, the Kurds joined the opposition against pro-government forces. However, the YPG-controlled neighborhood of Sheikh Maqsoud was often under siege by both Syrian government forces and the rebels. In September 2015, the rebels accused the YPG of collaborating with the government and began shelling Sheikh Maqsoud. Between November and December 2015, the conflict between the rebels and US-backed Kurdish-led Syrian Democratic Forces (SDF) in the rest of Aleppo province escalated. Truce attempts largely failed to stop the fighting. The situation escalated in February 2016, when the SDF followed up on advances by the Syrian Armed Forces, backed by Russian airstrikes, and they themselves took territory north of Aleppo city from the rebels during the government offensive.

Starting in late September 2015, Russian warplanes carried out their first attacks in Syria. The Russian bombing campaign included strikes against rebel forces in Aleppo.

== Course of the battle ==
=== 2012: Initial rebel attack and capture of Eastern Aleppo ===
Gunfire between rebels and security forces broke out in and around Salaheddine, a district in the city's southwest, on the night of 19 July 2012.

In late July and early August 2012, the FSA continued its offensive in Aleppo, with both sides suffering a high level of casualties. Rebel commanders said their main aim was to capture the city center. On 30 July, the rebels seized a strategic checkpoint in Anadan, a town north of Aleppo, gaining a direct route between the city and the Turkish border—an important rebel supply base. They also captured Al-Bab, an army base northeast of the city. Later, rebels attacked the air base at Minakh, 30 km (19 miles) northwest of Aleppo, with arms and tanks captured at the Anadan checkpoint. Opposition forces continued to gain territory in the city, controlling most of eastern and southwestern Aleppo, including Salaheddine and parts of Hamdaniyeh. They continued to target security centers and police stations as clashes erupted near the Air Force intelligence headquarters in Aleppo's northwestern district Zahraa. Rebels over-ran several police stations and posts in the central and southern districts of Bab al-Nerab, Al-Miersa and Salhain, seizing a significant quantity of arms and ammunition.

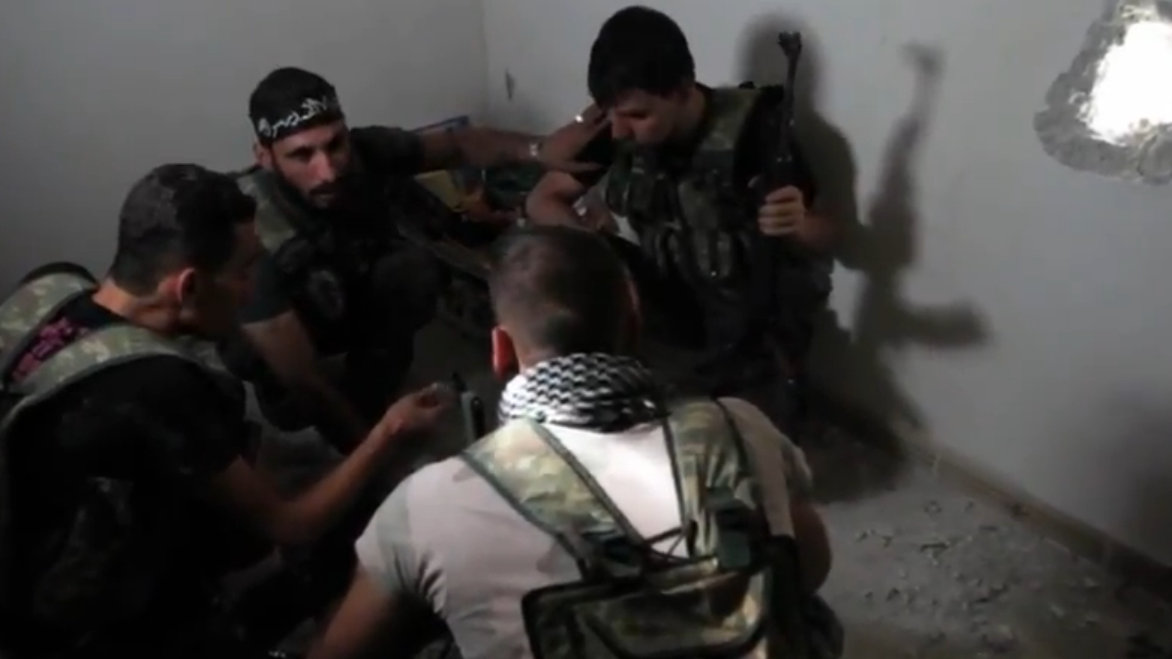
Free Syrian Army rebels hold a planning session

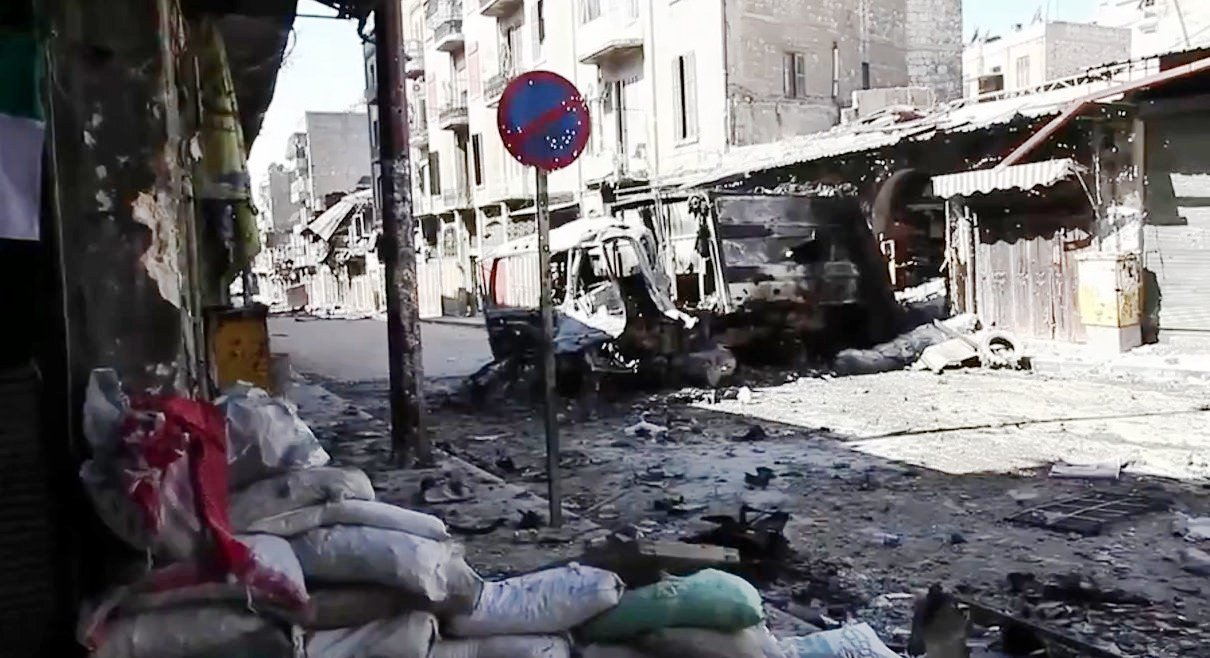
Bombed out vehicles in Aleppo

Conquest Brigade fighters battle government forces in al-Midan, September 2012

=== 2013: Advances and counter-advances ===
An ISIL suicide bomber detonates a car bomb during the Siege of Menagh Air Base.

In December 2012, Al-Nusra Front unilaterally declared a no-fly zone and threatened to shoot down commercial aircraft, alleging that the government was using them to transport loyalist troops and military supplies. After multiple attacks on Aleppo International Airport, all flights were suspended on 1 January 2013. The following month, the rebels seized Umayyad Mosque; and during the battle, the mosque's museum caught fire and its ceiling collapsed.

On 9 June, the Syrian Army announced the start of "Operation Northern Storm", an attempt to recapture territory in and around the city. Between 7 and 14 June, army troops, government militiamen and Hezbollah fighters launched the operation. Over a one-week period, government forces advanced in the city and the countryside, pushing back the rebels. However, according to an opposition activist, on 14 June the situation started reversing after rebels halted an armored reinforcement column from Aleppo that was heading for two Shiite villages northwest of the city.

On 8 November, the Syrian Army started an offensive against the rebel-held Base 80, launching "the heaviest barrage in more than a year". Al Jazeera English wrote that a government victory would cut the rebels' route between the city and al-Bab. Two days later, Reuters reported that the rebels had regrouped to fight the Syrian army. Fifteen rebels were killed and the army recaptured the base. The following month, the army partially besieged the city in Operation Canopus Star. During the offensive, Army helicopters attacked with barrel bombs, killing more than a thousand people, according to the Free Syrian Army's Abu Firas Al-Halabi.

=== 2014: Ba'athist government encirclement of the rebels ===
Government forces, having lifted the siege of Aleppo in October 2013, continued their offensive in 2014. This culminated in the capture of the Sheikh Najjar industrial district north of Aleppo and the lifting of the siege of Aleppo Central Prison on 22 May 2014, which contained a garrison of government soldiers that had resisted rebel forces since 2012. A ceasefire proposal was presented by a UN envoy in November; under the proposal humanitarian aid would be delivered to Aleppo following the cessation of hostilities. President Assad said the ceasefire plan was "worth studying", and according to the UN envoy the Syrian government was "seriously studying" the proposal. The FSA rejected the plan; its military commander Zaher al-Saket said they had "learned not to trust the [Bashar al-] Assad regime because they are cunning and only want to buy time".

=== 2015: War of attrition ===
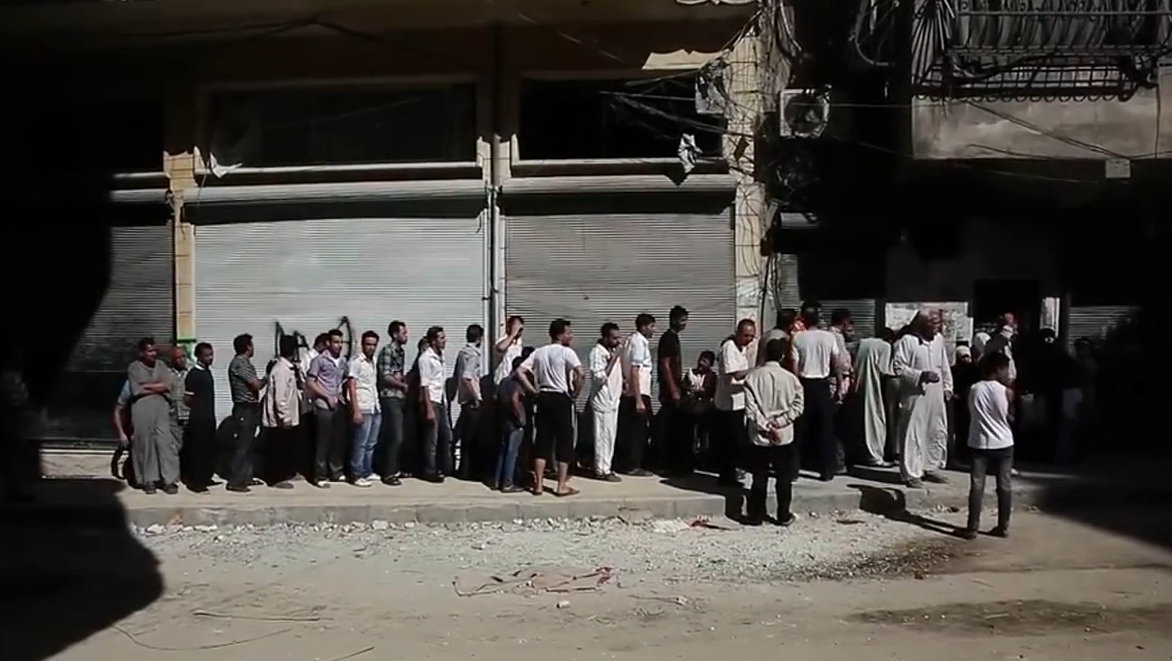
Aleppo residents waiting in a bread line during the Syrian civil war

In early January, the rebels recaptured the Majbal (sawmills) area of al-Brej and captured the southern entrance of the stone quarries known as al-Misat, forcing government troops to retreat to the north. Rebels also seized the Manasher al-Brej area. They tried to advance and take control of al-Brej Hill, with which they could seize the military supply road running between Aleppo Central Prison and the Handarat and al-Mallah areas. At the end of January, the rebels took control over some positions in al-Brej Hill.

In mid-February, the Syrian Arab Army and its allies launched a major offensive in the northern Aleppo countryside, with the aim of cutting the last rebel supply routes into the city, and relieving the rebel siege of the Shi'a-majority towns Zahra'a and Nubl to the northwest of Aleppo. They quickly captured several villages, but bad weather conditions and an inability to call up reinforcements stalled the government offensive. A few days later, the rebels launched a counter-offensive, retaking two of four positions they had lost to Syrian government forces.

On 9 March, opposition forces launched an assault on Handarat, north of Aleppo, after reportedly noticing confusion in the ranks of Syrian government troops after the February fighting. Opposition sources said the rebels had captured 40–50% of the village, or possibly even 75%, while the Army remained in control of the northern portion of Handarat. In contrast, a Syrian Army source stated they still controlled 80% of Handarat. On 18 March, after almost 10 days of fighting, the Syrian Army had fully expelled the rebels from Handarat, and re-established control of the village.

Rebel forces use tunnel bombs under Al-Hatab Square, in preparation for an assault on government troops in April 2015.

On 13 April, Islamist opposition forces and al-Nusra Front renewed their assault on the Air Force Intelligence building, utilizing a tunnel bomb followed by an assault. Much of the Air Force Intelligence building was reportedly damaged as a result of the tunnel bomb. Between 27 and 29 April, the FSA and Ahrar ash-Sham launched an operation in the old city of Aleppo and al-Hatab Square in Al-Jdayde (Jdeideh) District, which included tunnel bombs and the shelling of buildings where soldiers were stationed. The rebels claimed to have killed 76 troops in these operations. Sahat Al Hatab square and the buildings around it were left devastated as a result of this operation. Numerous monuments, including churches, a mosque, the Waqf of Ibshir Mustafa Pasha Complex complex, the wool souk and al-Hatab Square were heavily damaged or destroyed by the explosions.

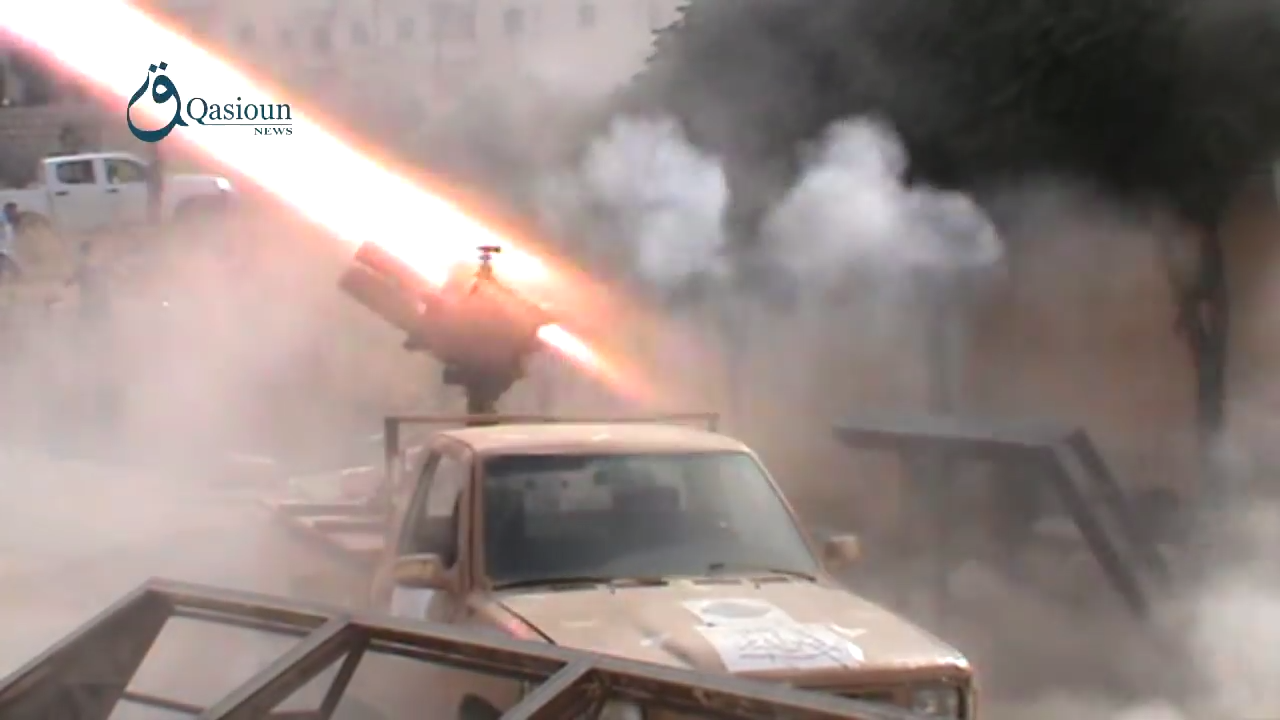
Sham Legion multiple rocket launcher mounted on a technical launches rockets at YPG positions in Aleppo, 2 October 2015.

In preparation for a new offensive, the rebels heavily shelled government-held parts of Aleppo, leaving 43 civilians dead and 190 wounded on 15 June. On 17 June, rebel forces captured the western neighborhood of Rashideen from Syrian government forces. Throughout 19 and 20 June, a new round of rebel shelling killed 19 more civilians. UK-based group SOHR asserted that Al-Nusra Front launched a suicide attack against a Ba'athist military outpost in July 2015 in Aleppo, killing 25 pro-Assad fighters.

In early July, two rebel coalitions launched an offensive against the government-held western half of the city. During five days of fighting, the rebels seized the Scientific Research Center on Aleppo's western outskirts, which was being used as a military barracks. Two rebel attacks on the Jamiyat al-Zahra area were repelled. Government forces launched an unsuccessful counter-attack against the Scientific Research Center.

In mid-October, ISIL captured four rebel-held villages northeast of Aleppo, while the Army seized the Syria-Turkey Free Trade Zone, al-Ahdath juvenile prison and cement plant. Meanwhile, the SAA and Hezbollah launched an offensive south of Aleppo, reporting they had captured 408 square kilometres (158 square miles) of territory in one month. By late December, reporting that they were in control of 3/4 of the southern Aleppo countryside.

By the end of 2015, only 80 doctors were left in eastern, rebel-held part of Aleppo, or only one for 7,000 residents, while only one bakery was left to serve 120,000 people.

=== 2016: Supply lines cut, surrender, and evacuation ===
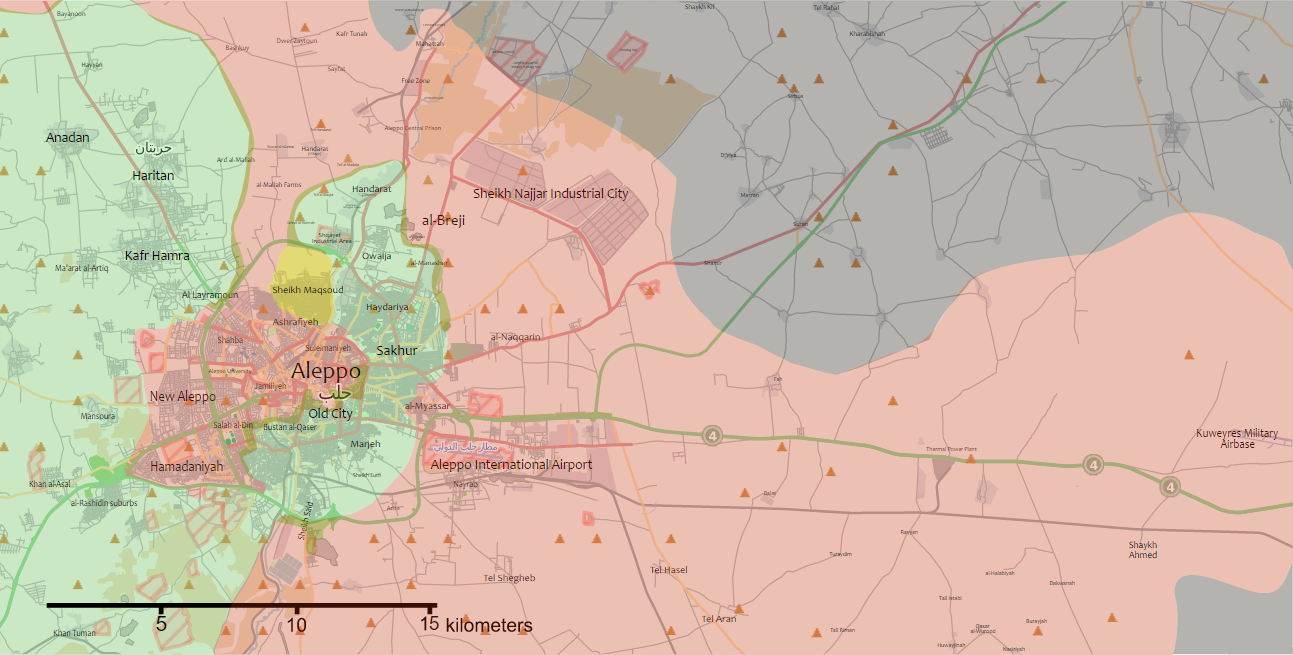
The situation in Aleppo on 20 August 2016, when both the rebels and Syrian government forces besieged each other Syrian Arab Army control Opposition control (including al-Nusra Front) SDF control Islamic State of Iraq and the Levant control Joint SAA-SDF control Confrontation or unclear situation

By 2016, it was estimated that the population of rebel-held Eastern Aleppo had been reduced to 300,000, while 1.5 million were living in government-held Western Aleppo.

In early February 2016, Syrian government forces and their allies broke a three-year rebel siege of two Shi'ite towns of Nubl and Zahraa, cutting off a main insurgent route to nearby Turkey. On 4 February, the towns of Mayer and Kafr Naya were recaptured by government forces. On 5 February, the government captured the village of Ratyan, to the northwest of Aleppo.

On 25 June, the Syrian Army and allied forces began their long-awaited North-west Aleppo offensive. The ultimate goal of the offensive was to cut off the Castello highway, which would cut off the last supply route for rebels inside the city, thus fully encircling remaining opposition forces.

By late July, Syrian government forces had managed to sever the last rebel supply line coming from the north, and completely surrounded Aleppo. Both the 4.000 rebels as well as tens of thousands of civilians were trapped in the rebel held part of Aleppo. The Syrian Army asked the rebels to stop their resistance and asked them to lay down arms and surrender. The rebels rejected, vowing they will fight until the last opposition soul remains. However, within days, the rebels launched a large-scale counterattack south of Aleppo, in an attempt to both open a new supply line into rebel-held parts of the city and cut-off the government-held side. The whole campaign, including both the Army's offensive and subsequent rebel counter-offensive, was seen by both sides as possibly deciding the fate of the entire war.

After a week of heavy fighting, rebels both inside and outside Aleppo advanced into the Ramouseh neighborhood, linked up and captured it, while also seizing Al-Ramousah Military Academy. With these advances, the rebels managed to cut the government's supply line into the government-held part of west Aleppo and announced the Army's siege of rebel-held east Aleppo had been broken. However, the new rebel supply line was still under Army artillery fire and being hit by air-strikes, making both sides essentially under siege. Since the rebel offensive started, at least 130 civilians had been killed, most by rebel shelling of government-held districts. 500 fighters on both sides also died, mostly rebels. However, on 4 September, the Syrian Armed forces recaptured the Technical College, Armament college and artillery college, thus imposing the siege on Aleppo once again. Later that week they recaptured the Ramouseh district and reversed almost all rebel gains made since 30 July. The Syrian Government forces then started an offensive to capture eastern Aleppo on 22 September, taking 15–20% of the rebel-held part of Aleppo.

Rebels started an attack on western Aleppo in late October, which failed, with government forces retaking areas in the south-west that they had lost to the rebel's late July offensive. The Syrian Army then launched a final offensive on 15 November, aimed at retaking all of rebel-held Aleppo, during which they captured the Hanano district, Sakhour district, Jabal Badro district, Bustan al-Basha district, Hellok district, Sheikh Kheder district, Sheikh Fares district Haydariyah district, Ayn al-Tal industrial district and reportedly the research housing south of Jabal Badro. They also captured the Ard' Al Hamra district, cutting rebel-held territory in Aleppo by 40–45%.

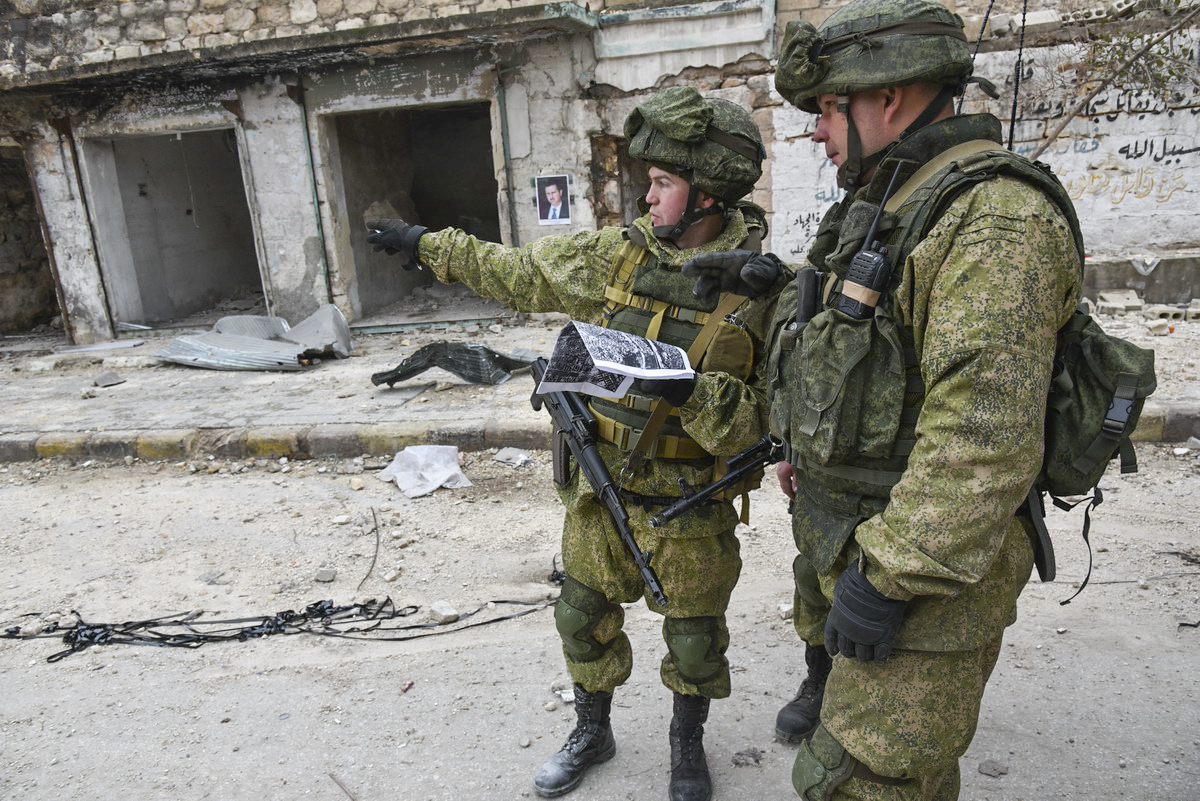
Russian Engineer Troops in a demining operation in Aleppo, 18 December 2016

By 13 December 2016, only 5% of the original territory of the city remained in rebel hands. A ceasefire was announced and the fighting stopped in order to allow the evacuation of civilians and rebels. The buses were prepared for the evacuation. However, the deal fell apart the next day, when the Syrian Government resumed their intense bombing of eastern Aleppo, with both sides blaming the other for the resumed fighting.

The deal was revived on 15 December with first convoy of evacuees leaving. The evacuation was however suspended on the next day. Another deal was reached on 18 December and evacuation resumed later in the day. The evacuation again stalled on 20 December, but resumed on the following day. On 22 December, the evacuation was completed while the Syrian Army declared it had taken complete control of the city. Red Cross later confirmed that the evacuation of all civilians and rebels was complete.

== Aftermath ==
During the final government offensive on East Aleppo from 15 November to 22 December 2016, an estimated 130,000 civilians left the former rebel-held enclaves for government-controlled areas, according to the SOHR. After the army recaptured East Aleppo, the Red Cross stated that around 34,000 people were evacuated from rebel-held East Aleppo (including approximately 4,000 rebel fighters). They were taken on buses and private cars via the southwestern industrial neighborhood of Ramouseh to rebel-held Idlib.

In the seven months after the battle from January to July 2017, the UN International Organization on Migration (IOM) estimated that at least 405,000 internally displaced persons (IDPs) and refugees returned to Aleppo. It noted that returnees to Aleppo province constituted 67% of all returnees in the first seven months of 2017, which was the largest return wave in years. By October 2017, the number of returnees rose to around half a million; of these, 300,000 returned to the former rebel-held Eastern neighborhoods of the city.

=== Further military developments ===
On 22 February 2018, it was reported that the YPG had agreed to hand over the eastern districts of the city of Aleppo to the Syrian government. According to Syrian state television, this decision was made to reinforce positions around the region of Afrin, and to halt Turkey's offensive. This came days after pro-Syrian government fighters agreed to bolster the Kurdish forces in the northwest.

SOHR and a witness later said that Syrian government forces had entered the areas controlled by the Kurdish fighters. YPG spokesman Nouri Mahmoud however denied this claim. A YPG commander later stated that Kurdish fighters had shifted to Afrin to help repel a Turkish assault. As a result, he said the pro-Syrian government forces had regained control of the districts previously controlled by them.

Throughout the start of 2020, the SAA made advances in the Idlib and Aleppo countryside. On 17 February, they had regained control of the last rebel-held suburbs in Aleppo city, gaining full control for the first time since 2012.

Starting from 27 November 2024, the Syrian rebels, under lead of HTS, launched a major offensive into the western and southern Aleppo governate capturing the entirety of the western governate. This offensive resulted in the rebels entering Aleppo two days after starting the offensive, making it the first rebel presence in Aleppo since the end of the battle in 2016.

== Strategic analysis ==
In the first few months of the battle, rebel forces expanded into the countryside south of Aleppo to control sections of the M4 and M5 highways, effectively blocking ground reinforcements for the Syrian Army. By the end of 2012, the Syrian Army in Aleppo was only receiving sporadic supplies and ammunition replenishment by air or via backroads. The fall of Base 46, a large complex that reinforced and supplied government troops, was seen by experts as "a tactical turning point that may lead to a strategic shift" in the battle for Aleppo. In a November 2012, intelligence report, American publisher Strategic Forecasting, Inc. described the strategic position of government forces in Aleppo as "dire", and said the Free Syrian Army had them "essentially surrounded".

On 26 November 2012, rebels captured Tishrin Dam, further isolating government forces in Aleppo and leaving only one route into Aleppo. By late January 2013 Deputy Prime Minister Qadri Jamil said all supply routes to Aleppo had been cut off by opposition forces, comparing the situation to the Siege of Leningrad. By late February 2013, Aleppo International Airport was almost surrounded by rebel forces. Later, the Syrian Army regained control of the strategic town Tel Sheigeb, allowing them to approach the airport. In November 2013, the Syrian Army retook the town of al-Safira. This opened a road for the government to support the besieged Kuweires Military Airbase and Aleppo Power Plant.

In February 2014, it was reported that the army planned to encircle Aleppo and impose blockades and truces. It would also try to recapture Sheikh Najjar Industrial City to rebuild the economy and provide jobs. By October 2014, the army had seized Sheikh Najjar, reinforced Aleppo Central Prison and captured Handaraat, almost besieging rebel-held Aleppo. Tensions peaked in early April 2014, when a Syrian Republican Guard officer allegedly killed a Hezbollah commander during an argument over the opposition advance in al-Rashadin, and other pro-government militia groups sent as reinforcements, such as the National Defence Force, proved to be unreliable in combat. Effectively cutting off access was more difficult in Aleppo because rebels controlled more terrain there than in other cities. Rebels also have a strong presence in the countryside and around the border crossings with Turkey. In April 2014 government commanders inside the city were saying that contrary to implementing such a strategy, "the best [they] can do in Aleppo is just secure ... positions".

The attempted encirclement involved the SAA's attacks on Bustan Al-Pasha, Khalidiyeh, the farms of Mazra'a Halabi, Al-Amariyya and Bustan Al-Qaseer. The rebels' strategic victory at the Siege of Wadi Deif resulted in threats to several main government supply lines. This cast doubt on government forces' ambitions to control the road from Hama to Aleppo and the Damascus-Aleppo international road, and has been seen as a personal defeat for Syrian Arab Army Col. Suhayl al-Hasan.

Staffan de Mistura, the United Nations and Arab League Envoy to Syria, proposed a pause in fighting, but opinions about implementation were divided. The European Union warned that "cases of forced surrender imposed by the Assad regime through starvation sieges were labelled fallaciously as local cease-fires in the past." The Southern Front of the Free Syrian Army, which was gaining ground in Deraa province south of Damascus, warned that a freeze in fighting in Aleppo could hamper their advance, as pro-Assad forces could be redirected from Aleppo.

The Syrian government's defeat at the Second Battle of Idlib in late March 2015, which helped expand the influence of al-Nusra Front, forced the Islamic State (IS) to expand its attacks in central Syria after it failed to block the Raqqa highway that branches out to the Syrian army's main supply route to Aleppo along the Khanasir-Athriya road. IS's aim would potentially be to establish the necessary conditions to attack Idlib and al-Nusra. The March–April IS offensive in central Syria led some volunteers defending the Homs-Aleppo highway to consider deserting to defend their hometowns.

According to Jane's Information Group, a possible offensive on Homs by both al-Nusra Front and IS working independently might force the government to move critical forces away from Aleppo to defend key supply routes. There were additional opposition gains during the 2015 Jisr al-Shughur offensive. Syrian government minister Faisal Mekdad stated in June 2015, "All our strategic planning now is to keep the way open to Aleppo to allow our forces to defend it". Media outlets have noted that powerful online campaigns are being conducted in a war of information regarding Aleppo.

=== The role of Turkey ===
Turkey had sponsored rebel forces in Aleppo to a degree that eastern Aleppo was called "a Turkish card guarded by jihadis." However, Turkish policy changed in August 2016, moving thousands of rebel fighters away from the area west of Aleppo to counter the secular federalist Syrian Democratic Forces to the north (see Turkish military intervention in Syria). This reduced the forces available to try to lift the siege of Aleppo, ensuring its fall.

== Casualties ==
Syrians walk through the former frontline in Aleppo's old city right after the conclusion of the Battle in January 2017

After more than four years of what has often been described as "the most devastating bombing" and fiercest urban warfare of the entire war, the Battle of Aleppo resulted in tens of thousands of deaths (both civilians and combatants) and hundreds of thousands of people displaced. As was the case in the rest of the Syrian conflict, exact casualty figures from the battle were extremely difficult to verify. However, several war monitors and non-governmental organizations have given estimates of the aggregate death toll of the battle.

According to the Violations Documentation Center in Syria (VDC)—a non-governmental organization linked to the Local Coordination Committees (LCC) of Syria—at least 31,273 people were killed across Aleppo province between 19 July 2012 and 15 December 2016, accounting for almost 10% of the overall casualties of the whole war at the time. Of these, the VDC documented 22,633 adult male deaths (73%), 2,849 adult female deaths (9.2%), 3,773 child male deaths (12.2%) and 1,775 child female deaths (5.7%). Among these, it counted 23,604 or 76% of fatalities as civilians, whereas 7,406 or 24% were combatant deaths. However, since the VDC claims it could not track fatalities among government troops, its count of combatant deaths reflects only rebel losses.

The VDC attributed the deaths to multiple causes; they included warplane bombardments (11,233 deaths), shootings (9,438 deaths), shelling (6,384 deaths), field executions (1,549 deaths), explosions (910 deaths), chemical and toxic gas attacks (46 deaths), among others. Because the data spans the entire province rather than just Aleppo city, perpetrators included the Syrian government, opposition groups, Russian forces, the SDF, ISIS, and the US-led international coalition forces who operated in other theaters of conflict in the countryside, though many perpetrators remained unidentified in the database.

Meanwhile, the pro-opposition Syrian Observatory for Human Rights (SOHR) registered 21,452 civilian deaths in Aleppo province from March 2011 to December 21, 2016, including 5,261 children and 2,777 women. SOHR attributed these deaths to actions by all warring parties—including Syrian and Russian airstrikes, deaths under detention, international coalition strikes, as well as shelling, snipers, and landmines perpetrated by all parties. The SOHR did not give a specific number breakdown for each perpetrator or for the city itself.

However, the existing data contains significant limitations. Medical researchers at The Lancet note that methodologies used by groups like the VDC may undercount deaths caused by collapsed buildings in a war characterized by intense aerial bombardment and shelling. A report by Action on Armed Violence in 2023 found that there were an average 22.9 civilians deaths per casualty-causing airstrike in Aleppo, one of the highest in modern times. The Syrian Network for Human Rights (SNHR), another pro-opposition non-governmental organization, estimated that the Russian bombardments alone killed at least 1,640 civilians in the Aleppo area since the beginning of Russia's aerial campaign in late September 2025; it noted that 1,178 civilians died from 30 September 2015 to 1 August 2016, while an additional 462 civilians were killed from 19 September 2016 to 30 November 2016. In May 2015, Amnesty International quoted the VDC as saying barrel bombs dropped by the Syrian air force killed 3,124 civilians across Aleppo province from January 2014 to March 2015.

Sampling bias presents another major data limitation, driven by lack of access across frontlines controlled by warring parties. Because many of the casualty monitors regularly cited by the media rely exclusively on activist networks in rebel-held regions, casualties in government-controlled territory often risked going underreported. In Aleppo, founder of the SOHR Rami Abdulrahman stated that civilian casualties in government-held West Aleppo during 2016 were often higher than in rebel-held East Aleppo. Crucially, he attributed this difference to West Aleppo's "much higher population density" (roughly 1.4 million) by 2016, which was "five to six times" that of East Aleppo (175,000 to 300,000 people).

Two years into the battle, the Lebanese newspaper As-Safir said it obtained records from Aleppo forensic health authorities that documented 4,090 civilian deaths caused by rebel shelling, bombings and snipers in government-held Aleppo between July 2012 and July 2014. In November 2016, both The New York Times and LA Times quoted the same health authorities saying that casualties from rebel attacks on West Aleppo had risen to 11,000 civilian deaths. In December 2016, the pro-government Sham FM radio station gave a more specific number from the head of Aleppo's forensics saying 10,760 civilians were killed in rebel attacks on West Aleppo since the start of the battle in July 2012.

Amid the devastation, the International Committee of the Red Cross (ICRC) described the fighting as one of the most devastating conflicts in modern times. It appealed: "The human cost of the fighting in Aleppo is simply too high. We urge all parties to stop the destruction and indiscriminate attacks, and stop the killing". The ICRC also said that hundreds of civilians perished through the "indiscriminate shelling of residential areas across Aleppo". Several infectious diseases broke out in Aleppo and other areas in Syria during the civil war, including poliomyelitis, measles and cutaneous leishmaniasis. Food prices also grew astronomically during the war. A kilogram (two pounds) of sugar cost $21 at one point.

== Allegations of war crimes ==
=== Syrian government and allies ===
The violations and abuses suffered by people across the country, including the siege and bombardment of eastern Aleppo, are not simply tragedies; they also constitute crimes of historic proportions.

— UN High Commissioner for Human Rights, Zeid Ra'ad Al Hussein

According to an Amnesty International report, government forces have been responsible for the majority of violations committed throughout the Syrian conflict. Ravina Shamdasani, a spokesperson for the Office of the UN High Commissioner for Human Rights, stated in November 2016 that "strikes against hospitals, schools, marketplaces, water facilities and bakeries are now commonplace, and may amount to war crimes". Similarly, Human Rights Watchissued a statement in December 2016 that the joint Syrian and Russian military campaign killed more than 440 civilians—including more than 90 children—between September and October 2016 in rebel-held East Aleppo. It deplored that airstrikes appeared "recklessly indiscriminate".

During this latter phase of the offensive, the UN estimated that about 250,000 civilians were left in the rebel-held eastern portion of the city. In November 2016, UNICEF estimated that nearly 100,000 children were living under siege in Eastern Aleppo. The 2016 offensive cut off Eastern Aleppo from food supplies, and last time the area was reached with significant humanitarian supplies before the Syrian Army re-capture was the beginning of July in 2016. This led to accusations that the Syrian government and Russia were using starvation as a deliberate tactic of warfare—widely considered a war crime.

The Syrian government and the Russian army were accused of using war planes to systematically target hospitals in the rebel-held areas of the city, particularly during its assault to retake East Aleppo in late 2016. By the end of November 2016, UN Under-Secretary-General for Humanitarian Affairs, Stephen O'Brien stated that "no functional hospitals were left" in East Aleppo, and up to 16,000 people were displaced by the fighting.

The Syrian government and its Russia allies were accused of bombing hospitals numerous times during the battle from 2012 to 2016. Some notable incidents of Syrian or Russian attacks on hospitals include:

- On 21 November 2012,VICE News reported that government missile strikes hit the Dar al-Shifa Hospital in the Shaar neighborhood, killing 25 people, including 4 medical staff. The Syrian Observatory for Human Rights (SOHR) reported that the deaths included 11 rebel fighters.
- On 27 April 2016, MSF reported that airstrikes struck the MSF-supported Al-Quds hospital in the Sukkari district, destroying its emergency wing and trapping patients and medical staff. A subsequent strike hit the rear of the hospital. The attack reportedly killed 55 people, including six medical staff. The hospital suffered two other attacks in June 2015 that caused "minor damage" to the higher floors of the facility.
- On 16 July 2016 and 13 October, two underground field hospitals in Maadi and Sakhour districts supported by the Syrian American Medical Society (SAMS) were struck by either Russian jets or Syrian helicopters.

Between 29 January and 14 March 2013, opposition activists reported about 230 bodies were found on the banks of the Queiq River in Aleppo. They accused government forces of being the ones who executed the men since the bodies came downstream from he direction of government-held areas of the city. Human Rights Watch identified 147 victims, all male and aged between 11 and 64, and noted that many family members of the victims reported that the men were last seen in government-controlled sectors or after attempting to cross checkpoints operated by government forces. While the report did not assign definitive blame, it asserted a high likelihood that the executions were committed by pro-government forces.

In 2014, the United Nations adopted Resolution 2139 which ordered the Syrian government to end the use of barrel bombs in the battle. The pro-opposition monitor Syrian Observatory of Human Rights (SOHR) stated that the Syrian army dropped 7,000 barrel bombs in the first five months of 2015, claiming the lives of 3,000 people across Aleppo Governorate in both the city and the larger countryside. Amnesty International reported that barrel bombs killed over 3,100 people across the entire province in 2014. Channel4 reported that videos have emerged online showing the Syrian army using barrel bombs.

The Syrian government was accused of using the barrel bombs in densely populated areas of the city many times during the battle. Some of them were:

- Middle East Monitor reported 14 deaths allegedly caused by the bombs in the southeastern Kallasa and Qasila neighbourhoods of the city in June 2015.
- BBC News alleged the government dropped barrel bombs in May, leading to the death of 72 civilians. Of these civilians, 12 were reportedly killed in rebel-held East Aleppo, whereas 60 were killed in the ISIS-held town of Al-Bab in the Aleppo countryside.
- The Anadolu Agency of Turkey wrote that the bombs launched by the government forces in July killed 15 people in the Al-Salihiya neighborhood in East Aleppo.
- According to the Violations Documentation Center, government barrel bomb attacks peaked between April and July 2014, with an average of 107 attacks per month, and decreased to an average of around 17 per month from September 2014 to March 2015.

Syrian and Russian forces have been deliberately attacking health facilities... But what is truly egregious is that wiping out hospitals appears to have become part of their military strategy.. a strategy that has destroyed scores of medical facilities and killed hundreds of doctors and nurses since the start of the conflict... Hospitals in opposition-controlled areas around Aleppo became a primary target for the Russian and Syrian government forces. This eliminated a vital lifeline for the civilians living in those embattled areas, leaving them no choice but to flee.

— Tirana Hassan, then-director of Amnesty International's crisis response program

The Syrian government denied using barrel bombs. In an interview with BBC, Bashar al-Assad denied using "indiscriminate weapons" like barrel bombs in the rebel held territories. Assad said, "I know about the army. They use bullets, missiles and bombs. I haven't heard of the army using barrels, or maybe cooking pots."

Amnesty International issued a detailed report on Aleppo in 2015. It warned that the Syrian government was using of imprecise explosive weapons on densely populated civilian areas, illustrating in one example how eight barrel bomb attacks between January 2014 to March 2015 killed at least 188 civilians—yet only one rebel was recorded among the fatalities. It concluded that the government forces in Aleppo deliberately targeted civilians and civilian objects, implemented "forced disappearances", used torture and other ill-treatment among the prisoners—and that this constitutes a crime against humanity.

Two chemical attacks by the Syrian government on opposition-held areas in Aleppo were reported on 10 August and 6 September 2016. After these attacks, victims reported suffering from a shortness of breath, coughing, reddened skin and eyes, and excessive tearing, and sought medical treatment in hospitals. Five people, including three children, died as a result of both attacks. A UN report found the Syrian government responsible for using prohibited chlorine bombs in Aleppo, causing "hundreds of civilian casualties". Human Rights Watch also condemned the Russian army for using incendiary weapons in Aleppo in violation of international law. Cluster bombs were also allegedly used both by the Russian aviation and the Syrian government. Russia was directly accused of war crimes several times for its part in the battle at the UN Security Council by the ambassadors of the United Kingdom, the United States and France, due to its use of bunker buster and incendiary bombs on urban residential areas.

On 19 September 2016, a UN/Syrian Arab Red Crescent (SARC) aid convoy was attacked at night, as well as a SARC warehouse and health clinic in Urum al-Kubra, a rebel-held town 12 km west of Aleppo. 20 civilians and one SARC staff member were killed, while food and medical aid, intended to reach Aleppo city, was destroyed. Some witnesses on the ground at the time of the attack said they had heard helicopters during the attack. The United States accused Russian or Syrian government warplanes of perpetrating the attack; Russia rejected the accusation. The UN said it was not in a position to determine how the attacked unfolded. The UN Operational Satellite Applications Programme (UNOSAT) however, said it believed the convoy was attacked by airstrikes. United Nations investigators later concluded that the Syrian government was responsible for the attack in a "meticulously planned and ruthlessly carried out" air strike. The investigators stated in a report that the Syrian Air Force used barrel bombs and rockets to attack the convoy and that, after the initial attack, Syrian government jets strafed the survivors. According to the investigators, since these actions were carried out deliberately they constituted a war crime.

Following the recapture of parts of Aleppo by the Syrian government, the Office of the United Nations High Commissioner for Human Rights received reports from the ground that a pro-government Iraqi Shi'ite paramilitary group killed at least 82 civilians, including 11 women and 13 children, in the Bustan al-Qasr, al-Ferdous, al-Kallaseh, and al-Salheen neighbourhoods on 12 and 13 December 2016.

In January 2017, the Syrian Network for Human Rights (SNHR) and the Violations Documentation Center (VDC) submitted evidence of alleged war crimes committed by militias backed by Russia and Iran to the United Nations Commission of Inquiry on Syria. According to the head of the SNHR, Fadel Abdul Ghany, "sometimes the Russians exceed the regime in some kinds of violations" and he noted the similarities between the kinds of war crimes and violations committed by Russian forces and those of the Assad regime.

In February 2017, Breaking Aleppo, a report by the Atlantic Council's Digital Forensic Research Lab utilized open source and digital forensic research to reveal both the Syrian government's atrocities and those of its supporters in the final months of the siege of Aleppo. In March 2017, the UN Independent International Commission of Inquiry on the Syrian Arab Republic documented violations including chemical attacks and civilian executions perpetrated between 21 July and 22 December 2016.

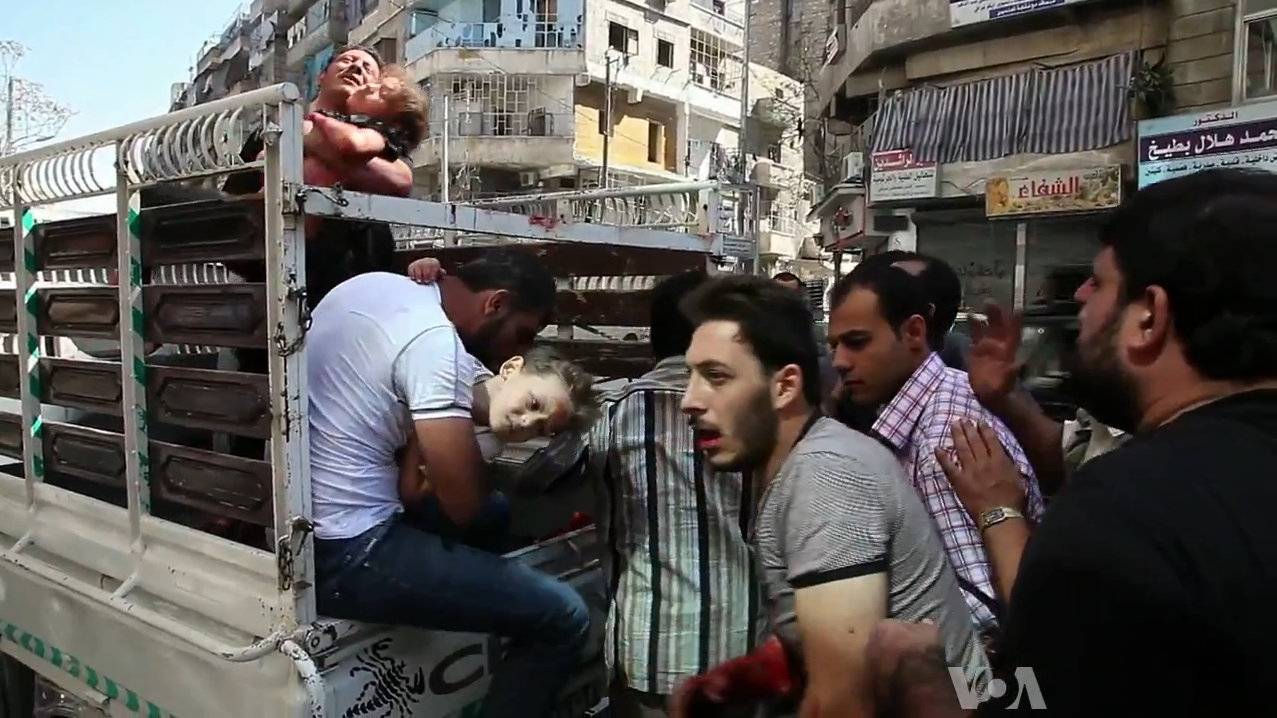
Wounded civilians arrive at the Dar al-Shifa hospital in Aleppo during the early months of the battle in October 2012

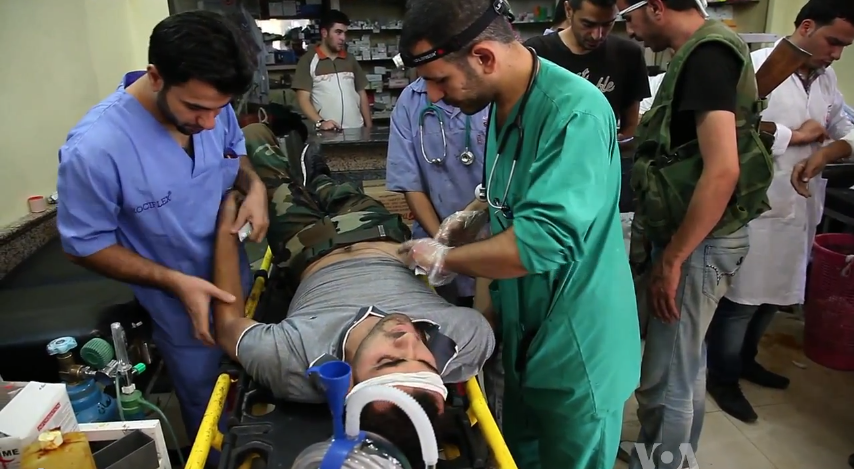
Doctors and medical staff treating injured rebel fighters and civilians in Dar al-Shifa hospital, Aleppo in October 2012

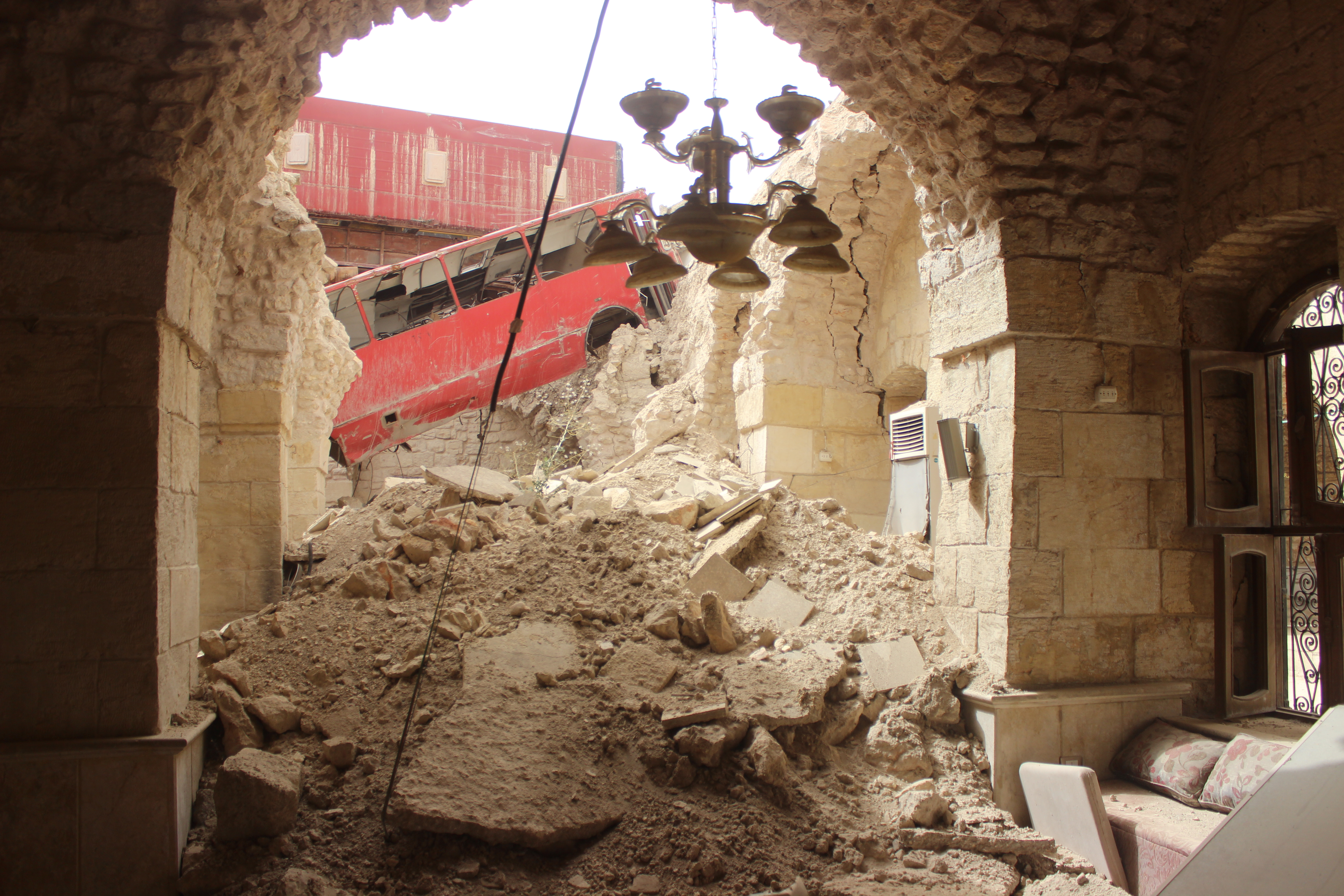
Al-Haddadin mosque in the Bab al-Hadid neighborhood after it was bombed by Syrian government forces

=== FSA and Islamist Rebels ===
For their part, rebel factions stand accused of war crimes by human rights organizations throughout the course of the battle for engaging in repeated, indiscriminate artillery and mortar shelling of civilian areas in government and Kurdish-held areas of the city. In Aleppo, rebels groups famously deployed improvised artillery known as "hell cannons"—a type of makeshift mortar designed to fire repurposed metal gas canisters and even water heater tanks packed with explosives and shrapnel including nails, glass and ball bearings. UN High Commissioner For Human Rights Zeid Ra'ad Al Hussein condemned their usage as "totally unacceptable" noting that their extreme inaccuracy made them impossible to aim correctly, frequently killing and maiming civilians in government-held Aleppo. According to Zeid, their indiscriminate nature served no legitimate military purpose, so he concluded their use was primarily to "terrorize the inhabitants of western Aleppo". Professor Mark A. Summers of Barry University School of Law, a legal expert previous assigned to the Office of the Prosecutor for the International Criminal Tribunal for the Former Yugoslavia, wrote that both the uses of barrel bombs by government forces and hell cannons by rebel forces were so inaccurate and randomly destructive that their use was illegal, and constituted either the direct or indiscriminate targeting of civilians and civilian objects.

The pro-opposition Syrian Observatory for Human Rights (SOHR) reported in December 2014 that between July and December 2014, rebel forces killed more than 300 civilians using hell cannons alone. The observatory attributed the deaths and wounded of 900 civilians in those months to the 16th division of the Free Syrian Army (FSA) led by Khalid Hayani. On 5 May 2015, Amnesty International cited the SOHR claiming that 672 civilians were killed by rebel hell cannons in the year of 2014 (including 137 children and 80 women). Reporting from Aleppo, Newsweek correspondent James Harkin noted in August 2015 how rebel hell cannon attacks on the frontline neighborhood of Salaheddine in June of 2015 were so widespread and indiscriminate that locals likened it to "raining gas canisters", causing massive physical destruction and sowing mass panic. Quoting local lawyers and activists in West Aleppo, Harkin notes how FSA battalions were more prone to using gas canister mortars than Al-Qaeda linked groups, making the distinction between moderates and extremists opaque in terms of the threat to civilian lives. In September 2016, the Middle East correspondent for Los Angeles Times, Nabih Bulos, cited the SOHR as claiming that 178 civilians, including 52 children, were killed by rebel hell cannon attacks in the previous month of August in government-held Aleppo. The SOHR noted how the death toll in August from rebel hell cannon attacks among children was higher than those caused by regime airstrikes because of its much denser population. In July 2016, SOHR told CNN that for 80 consecutive days since April 2016, shelling on western Aleppo became more intense, with his organization attributing around 40% of roughly 6,000 people killed in Aleppo during that period to rebel shelling.

In late 2016, UN officials warned that rebels operating in the city's western countryside may have been committing war crimes by engaging in indiscriminate rocket warfare targeting residential neighborhoods in their offensive to lift the siege of East Aleppo in October and November 2016. Rebel fighters deployed dozens of suicide and car bomb attacks, including a major blast in northwest residential neighborhood of Jamiyat al-Zahra, leading to casualties and major damages to civilian infrastructure. Rebels also fired rockets at two schools during the offensive killing over 14 children and two adults. Reporting from western Aleppo, New York Times correspondent Anne Barnard described the scenes at the morgue in Al-Razi hospital as ambulances carrying those wounded and killed from the rebel offensive flooded the health facility on 3 November 2016. She noted that Aleppo health officials tallied 137 civilians killed by rebel shelling in the previous month of October, which was among the deadliest in years. For his part, Nabih Bulos from the LA Times described the scenes at Al-Razi hospital on the same day as "visions of hell," recording that 13 civilians were killed and more than 150 wounded in a day by rebel shelling of the western districts of Hamdaniya and New Aleppo.

Rebels have also been accused of targeting health facilities in government-held areas. Some notable incidents include:

- On 9 September 2012, the FSA exploded a car bomb near the al-Hayat hospital and the Central Hospital in the Ansari district. BBC reported the initial death toll to be 17 people killed; Syrian state media later updated the death toll to 30 killed and 64 wounded. The blast also caused damage to a nearby elementary school.
- On 21 October 2012, a suicide car bomb exploded outside the Syrian-French hospital and the al-Kalima school in the New Syriac district. The blast caused "several injuries" according to Syrian state media.
- On 3 May 2016, Rebel shelling hit the Dabbit maternity hospital and its surroundings in the al-Mohafaza district, killing at least 3 women, and seriously wounding dozens more. Other sources put the casualties higher.
- On 5 December 2016, Russia accused Syrian rebels of deliberately shelling a field hospital they operated in the Furqan district, which was reportedly aiding evacuated civilians from districts of Aleppo recently taken by government and Russian forces. Two Russian female medics were killed and one seriously injured.

Islamist rebels have also been accused of targeting religious minorities and their places of worship, particularly churches and monasteries in Christian-majority districts near the frontline. Rebel mortars, IEDs (including car bombs and underground tunnel explosions) in districts like the historic Jdayde neighborhood caused widespread, often catastrophic damage to dozens of churches across the city. After entering the Armenian-majority neighborhood of Midan (Nor Kyugh) in October 2012, FSA factions set fire to the interior of the St. Kevork Armenian Apostolic Church. In one attack on 9 January, 2015, the Armenian Catholic Cathedral in Al-Jdayde was bombed hours before a Friday mass. In another incident on 17 January 2015, the Emmanuel Church of Aleppo in Al-Aziziyeh district was damaged when rockets fired by Islamist groups landed on the church hours after morning service. Rebels also reportedly targeted a nursing home in Midan district in June 2016, leading to casualties. Salafi jihadists such as Al-Nusra Front have also targeted and desecrated Sufi shrines, mosques and lodges. On 29 April 2016, rebels reportedly shelled a Sufi mosque and lodging in Bab al-Faraj, killing 15 worshippers.

There have also been reports of rebels indiscriminately shelling the predominantly Kurdish Sheikh Maqsoud neighborhood on multiple occasions, often with makeshift gas canister mortars and "Hamim" rockets weighing up to 200 kilograms. In mid-June 2016 Russia accused the rebels of causing the death of over 40 civilians in a single month in Sheikh Maqsoud. A spokesman for the SDF accused the rebels of causing 1,000 civilian deaths and injuries through shelling of Sheikh Maqsoud. The Army of Islam (Jaysh al-Islam) rebel group was also accused of using chemical weapons in the neighborhood on 7 and 8 April 2016, based on reports of eight treated patients. In May 2016, Amnesty International's regional director suggested that the attacks on Sheikh Maqsoud constituted war crimes. It implicated 11 armed groups in the indiscriminate attacks: they included Ahrar al-Sham, the Army of Islam (Jaysh al-Islam), Nour al-Din al-Zenki and the 16th division of the FSA; the armed groups reportedly targeted civilian homes, streets, markets and mosques in a densely populated neighborhood home to around 30,000 civilians.

Rebel groups such as al-Nusra Front, the Levant Front and the Ahrar al-Sham established Sharia law in areas they controlled, imposing torture and other ill-treatment as punishment. Al-Nusra Front maintained a prison at the "fetid, trash-strewn basement" of the Aleppo Eye Hospital where the group was headquartered. At this prison, some people were held for years and subjected to repeated torture. Human rights activists, aid workers, lawyers and journalists have been subjected to kidnappings for ransom. In 2015, Amnesty International warned that "non-state armed groups have engaged in abductions and hostage-taking, as well as the arbitrary detention, torture, and other mistreatment of prisoners in Aleppo". In another report it produced in 2016 Amnesty condemned rebel groups in the city for engaging in summary executions, in some cases in public, on the basis of "quasi-judicial institutions". The victims included captured soldiers, government officials, rival group members, and civilians. The report explicitly named Al-Qaeda affiliate Jabhat al-Nusra, Ahrar al-Sham, Nour al-Din al-Zenki and the Division 16 of the FSA as responsible for methods of torture "similar to some of the ones used by the Syrian government", including the stress positions like the shabeh, the tyre (dulab), beatings, electrocutions, as well as summary executions.

Russian General Staff Lieutenant General Viktor Poznikhir claimed that the Syrian government discovered several prisons in East Aleppo on 15 December 2016 used by the opposition to detain, torture and in some cases murder opponents, including civilians that refused to fight. At the conclusion of the battle, Syrian state media claimed the Army had found the bodies of 21 executed civilians in rebel prisons, citing the head of Aleppo's forensic unit. The Russian defence ministry also claimed the execution of dozens of people by the rebels, some showing signs of torture. The pro-opposition monitor SOHR confirmed bodies had been found in the streets but did not verify how they were killed.

Using starvation and deprivation of aid as a tactic of war is considered a war crime. In mid 2013, rebels captured the strategic town of Khan al-Assal on July 22, 2013, and another supply route in the town of Khanasir on August 26, 2013, cutting all supply roads leading into the city. According to the SOHR, the cutting of these supply roads placed government-held West Aleppo under siege, causing acute food and medical shortages as well as price hikes of essentials in the government-held west, with many residents reporting starvation. During their siege of government-held Aleppo, rebels closed the only civilian crossing linking the besieged government-held west and the rebel-held east in Bustan al-Qasr neighborhood in July 2013, worsening existing shortages at the onset of the Muslim holy month of Ramadan. Channel 4 News and The New York Times reported that civilians at the crossing were subjected to arrests and abuses at the hands of rebels who stopped them from smuggling food and other essentials to residents in west Aleppo. In response, civilians staged protests against the rebel siege, claiming their actions were no different from the pro-Assad shabbiha militias; rebel fighters dispersed the protesters by firing into the air. Later on, during the siege of eastern Aleppo in 2016, rebel groups were accused of hoarding food, allowing civilians to starve while they remained well-fed. Following the government re-captured of East Aleppo in December 2016, Euronews interviewed local civilians in the al-Kallasa neighborhood who accused the Islamist rebel group Jaysh al-Islam of prohibiting civilians from receiving food and supplies.

Denial of access to water and sanitation is also considered a war crime. Water supplies in the city for tens of thousands of people were deliberately cut by Jabhat al-Nusra after it attacked a pumping station in May 2014. The ensuing water shortage impacted neighborhoods both under government and rebel control.

During the UN-brokered cessation of hostilities in October 2016, civilians in Aleppo accused rebels of firing on them to prevent them from leaving eastern Aleppo along humanitarian corridors towards government areas. The UN later condemned these actions as war crimes, accusing rebels of holding civilians as hostages and effectively using them as human shields. During the December 2016 evacuations, Jabhat Fateh al-Sham burnt buses meant to evacuate sick and elderly civilians from two Shiite villages in Idlib province besieged by rebels, which happened concurrently with the evacuations of East Aleppo.

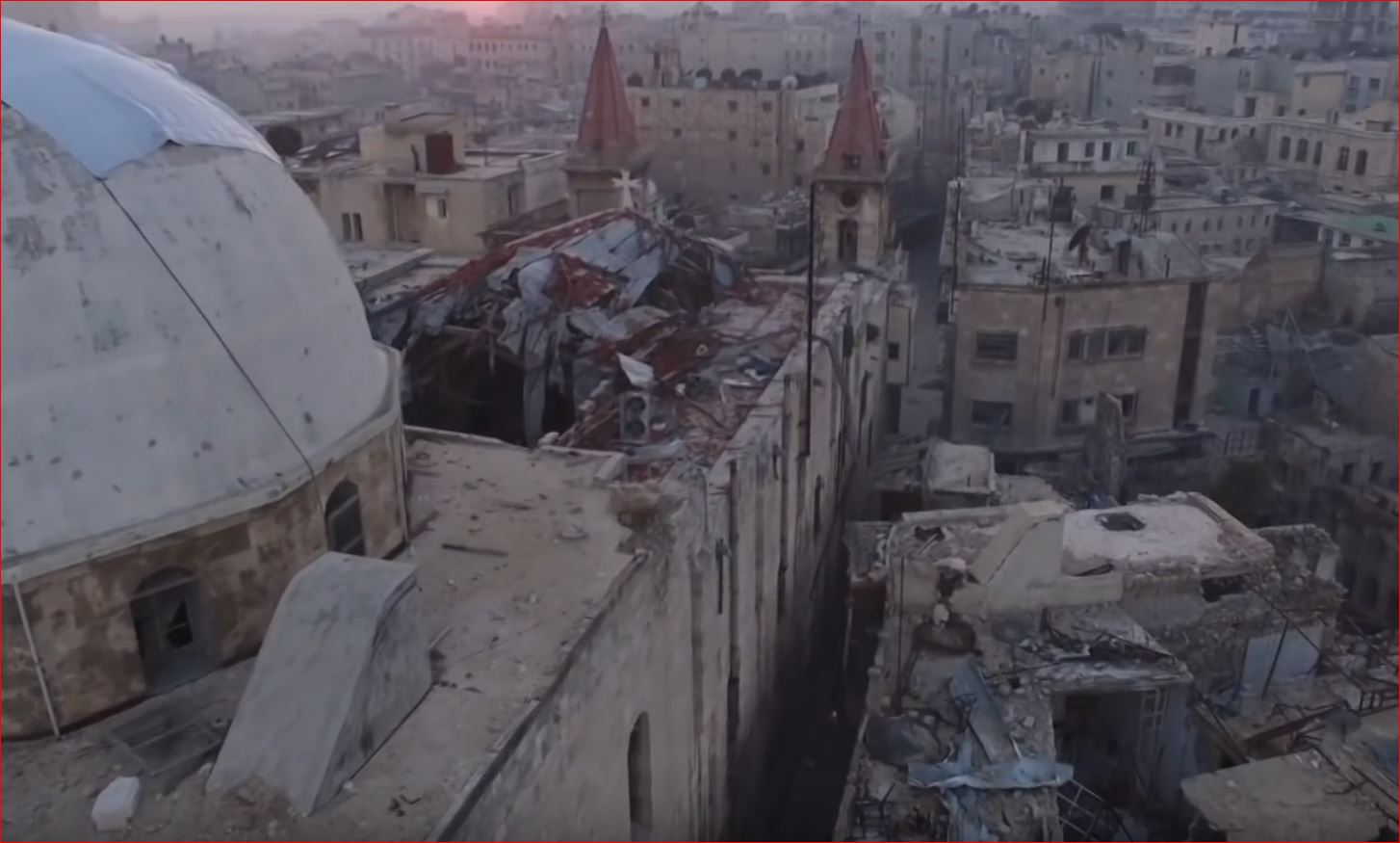
Damage from shelling at the St. Elijah Cathedral as seen from above in the Al-Jdayde district of the old city in 2016

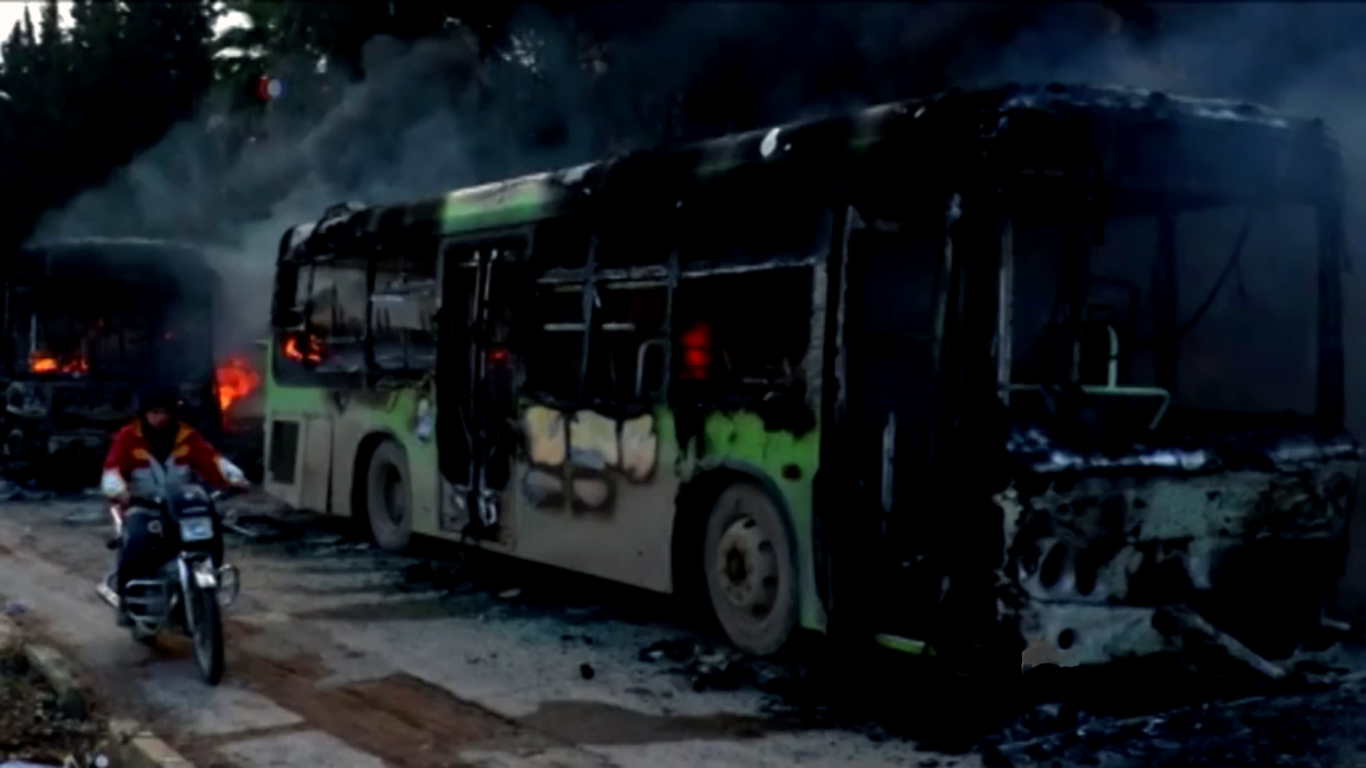
Rebels from Jabhat Fateh al-Sham burnt buses meant to evacuate sick and elderly civilians from two rebel-besieged Shiite villages in Idlib concurrent to the Aleppo evacuations of 2016

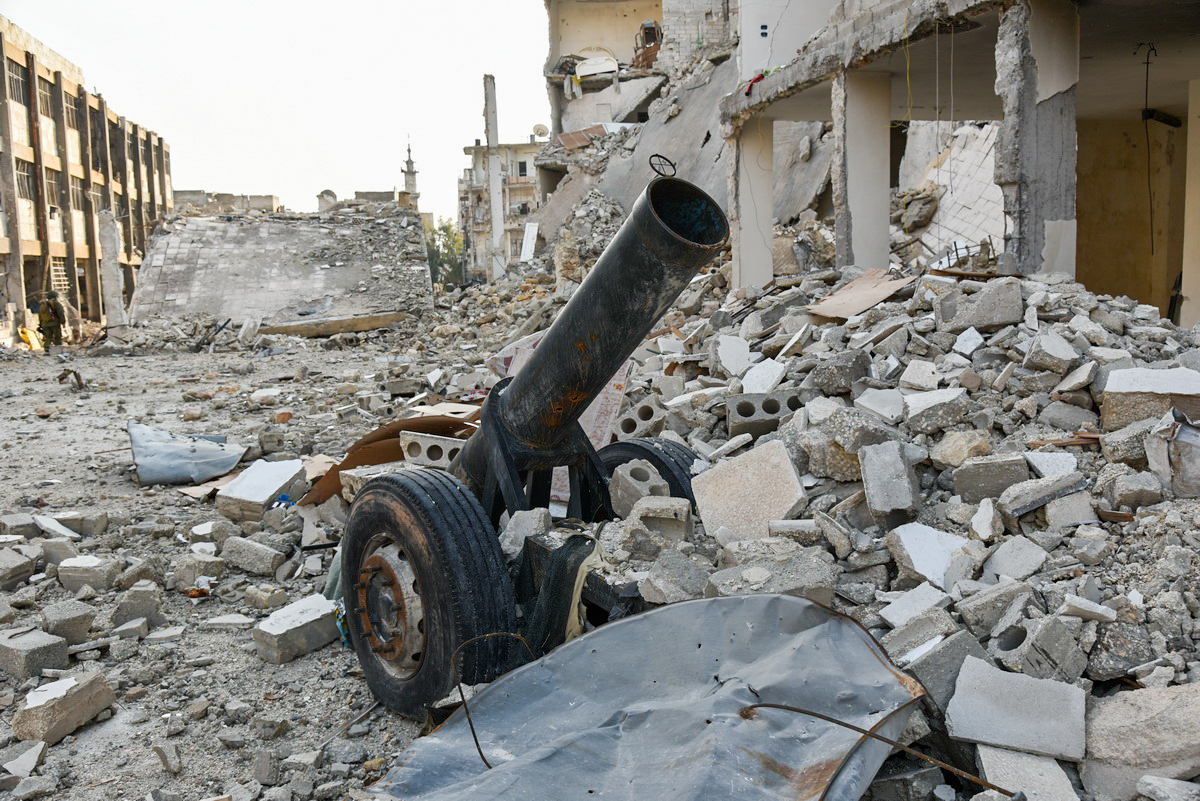
A rebel-made hell cannon found after the battle in December 2016

=== Kurdish-led forces ===
Amnesty reported that, according to the Syrian Network for Human Rights, "at least 23 civilians were killed by YPG shelling and sniper attacks" in opposition-held areas in the city between February and April 2016.

== Destruction of the city and heritage ==
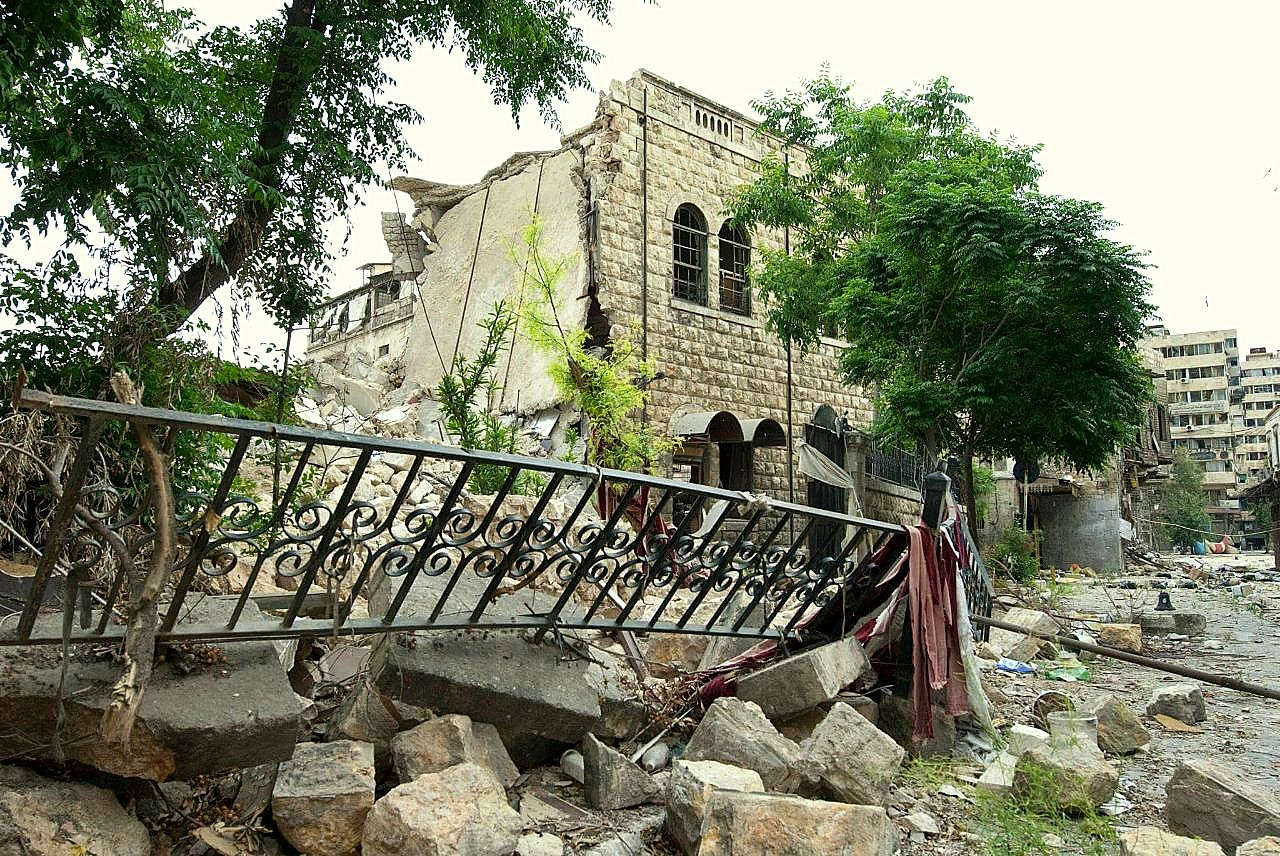
The National Evangelical Church of Aleppo (built in 1848) in the Al-Jdayde district in June 2013 after its destruction by tunnel bombs planted by rebels in 2012

Time magazine wrote:

...the ongoing devastation inflicted on the country's stunning archaeological sites—bullet holes lodged in walls of its ancient Roman cities, the debris of Byzantine churches, early mosques and crusader fortresses—rob Syria of its best chance for a post-conflict economic boom based on tourism, which, until the conflict started 18 months ago, contributed 12% to the national income.

Al-Madina Souq, a major souq (market) in Aleppo, was affected by a fire in September 2012. The Irish Times reported that around 700 to 1000 shops were destroyed by the fire, which had been caused by firing and shelling. The following month, there were reports of the Great Mosque of Aleppo being damaged by rocket-propelled grenades. Fighting with mortars and machine guns caused damage to the main gate and the prayer hall. The attack continued in the mosque till it was repelled by the army. The Citadel of Aleppo was damaged during Syrian army shelling.

On 2 October, Irena Bokova, the Director-General of UNESCO, expressed her "grave concern about possible damage to precious sites" and requested the combatants to "ensure the protection of the outstanding cultural legacy that Syria hosts on its soil". She cited the Hague Convention for protecting the heritage sites. A 2014 report by UNITAR found, using satellite images, that 22 out of the 210 examined key structures had been completely destroyed. 48 others had sustained severe damage, 33 moderate damage and 32 possible damage. The destroyed sites included the Carlton Citadel Hotel, destroyed to its foundations in a bombing in 2014, the madrasas of al-Sharafiyya and Khusruwiyah. Damage to the Great Mosque of Aleppo, whose minaret had been destroyed, was confirmed. According to official estimates, 1500 out of the 1600 shops in the souqs had been damaged or destroyed.

The Washington Post wrote that the scale of devastation of Aleppo "evoked comparisons with cities like Grozny and Dresden". It noted, however, that the destruction was mostly concentrated in the rebel-held part of the city: about 70 to 80 percent of the destruction was in the east. UN satellite images determined more than 33,500 damaged residential buildings in the city, most of them multi-apartment blocks. The costs of reconstruction were estimated at between $35–40 billion. Al-Hakam Shaar and Robert Templer proposed that the deliberate destruction of Aleppo was a form of "urbicide".

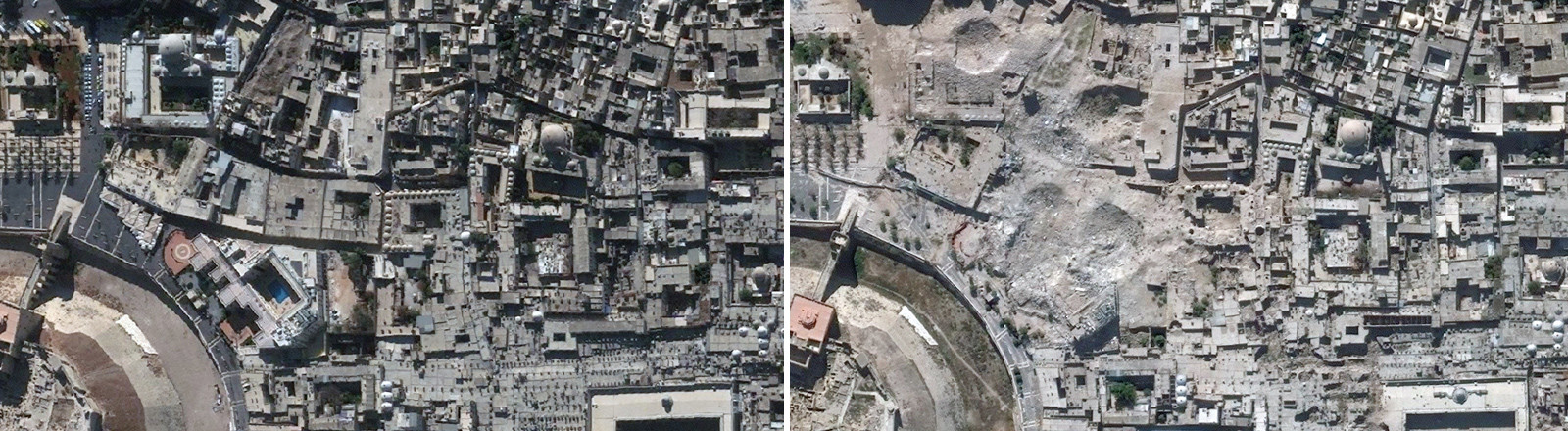
Satellite photographs taken before (2010) and after (late 2014) the destruction of the Old City of Aleppo near the Citadel, including Al-Khusrawiyah Complex (shown above at the left) and the National Hamidi Hospital (Carlton Hotel, shown in the left centre of the picture)

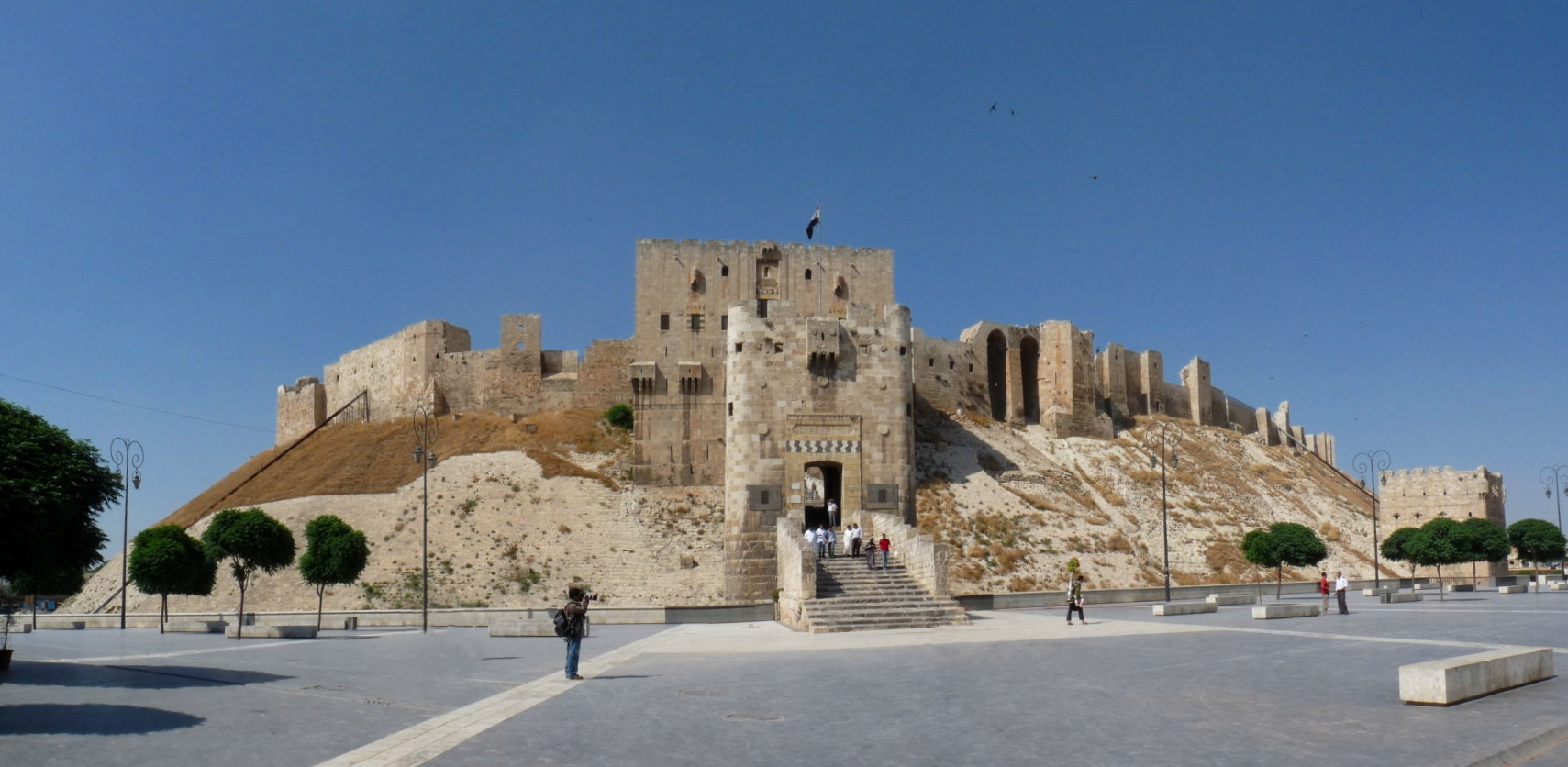
The Citadel of Aleppo was damaged during the war.

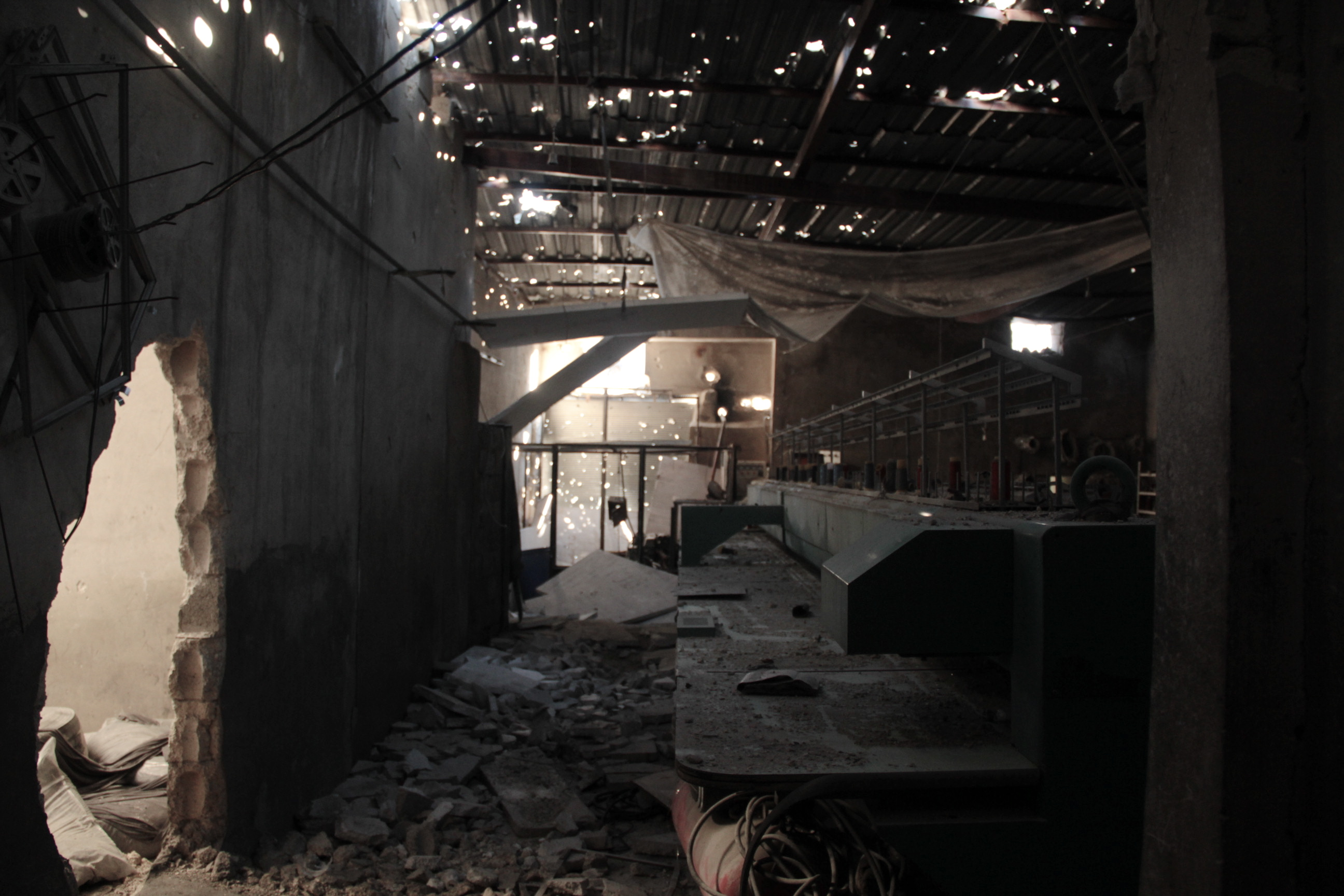
A destroyed factory in Aleppo, Karm al Jabl area, 4 March 2013

== Reactions ==
=== Media coverage ===
The coverage of the siege of Aleppo in the Western media emphasised the suffering of civilians and often contained graphic pictures of injured and dying children. As there were almost no international journalists in rebel-held Eastern Aleppo, reporting was outsourced to local activists often linked to rebels who held the city. This was a stark contrast to news coverage of the sieges of Raqqa and Mosul carried out by Coalition forces, where the civilian losses were frequently downplayed.

=== Domestic reaction ===
The Syrian President, Bashar al-Assad, said on the occasion of the 67th anniversary of the Syrian Arab Army in August 2012, "the army is engaged in a crucial and heroic battle ... on which the destiny of the nation and its people rests ..." After gaining nearly complete control of eastern Aleppo, Assad referred to this success as an "important point in history of Syria". He also called upon remaining rebel factions to surrender in exchange for amnesty.

==== Aleppo victory celebrations ====
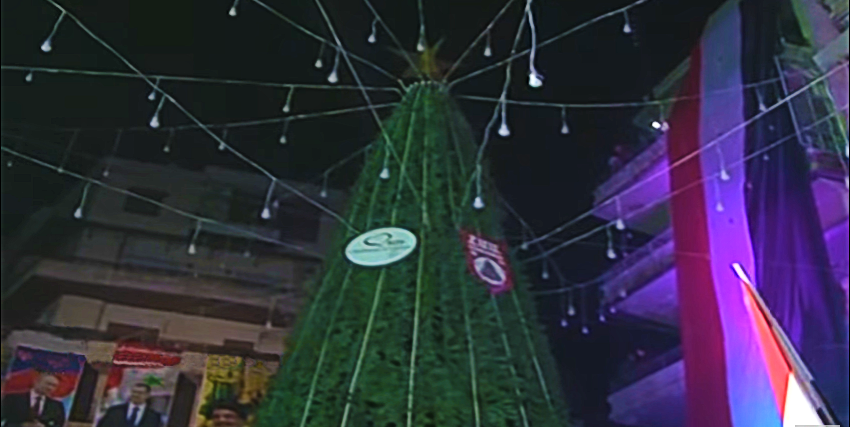
Several days after the Syrian government's victory, Christmas was celebrated in Aleppo in public for the first time in years.

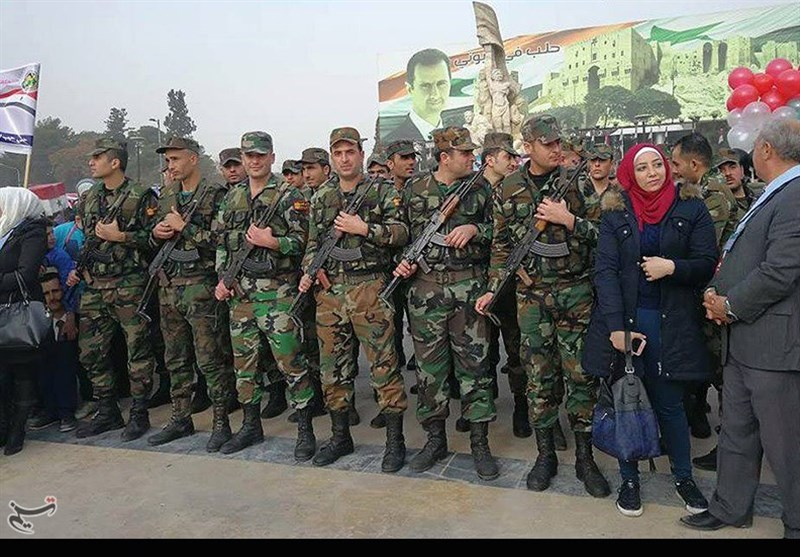
Syrian Arab Army soldiers at the celebrations of the 2nd anniversary of the liberation of Aleppo, 2018.

A series of victory celebrations were held in Aleppo following the government forces' victory, attended by government supporters, including Aleppo's Christian community which had increasingly sided with the government. Large-scale outdoor Christmas celebrations were held publicly for the first time in years, with a Christmas tree lighting ceremony in Al-Aziziyah neighborhood, attended by both Muslim and Christian government supporters. Participants waved Syrian and Russian flags and held portraits of President Bashar al-Assad, Russian President Vladimir Putin, and Hezbollah leader Hassan Nasrallah. A mass was held in Saint Elias Cathedral by Aleppo's Christian community for the first time in four years. The Christmas celebration, however, was disrupted with a bomb that exploded at the event. The celebration resumed several minutes after the bomb was detonated.

A May 2017 New York Times Magazine report from "Aleppo after the Fall" described the public experience in formerly rebel controlled East Aleppo as "a chaotic wasteland full of feuding militias—some of them radical Islamists—who hoarded food and weapons while the people starved" and quoted local sources as saying "no one is 100 percent with the regime, but mostly these people are unified by their resistance to the opposition" and people having experienced "a rebellion that is corrupt, brutal and compromised by foreign sponsors".

=== Foreign reactions ===
- In October and December 2016, the UN held a "Security Council Emergency Briefing on Syria" to discuss the situation in Aleppo. However, no agreement was reached. The United States Ambassador to the United Nations, Samantha Power criticized the Syrian government, Russia and Iran, in a speech at the briefing, stating "to the Assad regime, Russia, and Iran—three Member States behind the conquest of and carnage in Aleppo—you bear responsibility for these atrocities." Comparing the situation in Aleppo to the mass killings in Halabja, Rwanda and Srebrenica, she addressed the Syrian, Russian and Iranian governments, asking them "are you truly incapable of shame?" UN humanitarian chief Stephen O'Brien appealed to the Security Council to stop the bombardment of eastern Aleppo, describing residents "scrabbling with their bare hands in the street above to reach under concrete rubble trying to reach their young child screaming unseen in the dust and dirt below their feet". The Russian ambassador, Vitaly Churkin, dismissed his speech, saying: "If I wanted to be preached at, I'd go to church".
- At an EU summit in December 2016, German Chancellor Angela Merkel said that Russia and Iran were responsible "for crimes committed against the Syrian population" by the Assad government and that these should not go unpunished. The US secretary of State John Kerry also said that "there is absolutely no justification whatsoever for the indiscriminate and savage brutality against civilians shown by the regime and by its Russian and Iranian allies over the past few weeks, or indeed over the past five years."
- Armenia began sending humanitarian aid to Aleppo in mid-October 2012. The aid was distributed by Red Crescent, the Armenian National Prelacy in Aleppo, the Aleppo Emergency unit, the Embassy of Armenia to Syria, and the Consulate General of Armenia in Aleppo. The Governor of the Aleppo Governorate, Mohammad Wahid Aqqad, said, "the Syrian people highly appreciate this humanitarian gesture of the Armenian people, underlining the strong Syrian-Armenian cooperation".
- The French Foreign Ministry said, "With the build-up of heavy weapons around Aleppo, Assad is preparing to carry out a fresh slaughter of his own people". Italy and the UN peacekeeping chief also accused the Syrian government of preparing to massacre civilians.
- As the Battle of Aleppo started, Saeed Jalili, the head of Iran's Supreme National Security Council, met with Assad in Damascus. Jalili said Iran would help Assad to confront "attempts at blatant foreign interference" in Syria's internal affairs, saying, "Iran will not allow the axis of resistance, of which it considers Syria to be an essential part, to be broken in any way". During the Tehran sermon on 16 December 2016, Ayatollah Mohammad Emami Kashani praised the "Aleppo triumph" as a "defeat of the infidels". In contrast, Iranian reformist and former director of Western Asian affairs in the Iranian Foreign Ministry, Mir-Hossein Mousavi, said that he cannot applaud at what happened in Aleppo, concluding it is "nothing but a two nights' joy and Tehran will be worrying for the next 30 years about it."
- The Russian Foreign Ministry issued an official statement condemning the bombing that occurred on 9 September 2012, in which more than 30 people were killed. The ministry stated, "We firmly condemn the terrorist acts which claim the lives of innocent people", on 11 September. The Foreign Ministry also called on foreign powers to pressure the armed opposition to stop launching "terrorist attacks". The Russian Consulate General in Aleppo suspended operations on 16 January 2013. In May 2016 Iranian shrine defenders had photo shoot sessions with the photos of Aleppo ruins as their background photo at the international book fair of Tehran.
- Turkish Prime Minister Recep Tayyip Erdoğan urged international action, saying it was not possible "to remain a spectator" to the government offensive on Aleppo. Reuters reported that Turkey had set up a base with allies Saudi Arabia and Qatar to direct military and communications aid to the Free Syrian Army from the city of Adana. Reuters also quoted a Doha-based source, which stated that Turkey, Qatar and Saudi Arabia were providing rebel fighters with weapons and training.
- William Hague, the British Foreign Minister, said, "the world must speak out to avert a massacre in Aleppo".
- The United States stated it feared "a new massacre" in Aleppo by the Syrian government; "This is the concern: that we will see a massacre in Aleppo and that's what the regime appears to be lining up for". The United States condemned "in the strongest possible terms" the government SCUD missile strikes on Aleppo in late February 2013, saying they were "the latest of the Syrian regime's ruthlessness and its lack of compassion for the Syrian people it claims to represent".

Jan Egeland, Special Advisor to the UN Special Envoy for Syria, stated in November 2016: "I have not seen a place where there has been so much politicization, manipulation of aid, as we have seen in Syria in recent months. It has to stop!". He also called the bombardment and destruction of the city a "dark chapter" in modern history:

We all feel strongly that the history of Aleppo through this war will be a 'black chapter' in the history of international relations. It took 4,000 years to build Aleppo, hundreds of generations, yet one generation managed to tear it down in four years. Aleppo, for three thousand years, gave to the world civilization and world civilization was not there to assist the people of Aleppo when they needed us the most.

In his last press conference as the United Nations Secretary-General on 16 December 2016, Ban Ki-moon declared: "Aleppo is now a synonym for hell". The UN High Commissioner for Refugees delivered a statement on 17 December 2016, calling for an immediate end to the war in Syria: "With the situation in Aleppo, Syria's war has reached an historic low... Aleppo has become a metaphor for the disastrous situation that Syria is in today, with half the population having been forced from their homes." The Washington Post compared the destruction of Aleppo to the siege of Sarajevo in the 1990s.

On 20 December 2016, the United Nations Security Council approved "adequate, neutral UN monitoring and direct observation on evacuations from the eastern districts" in Aleppo.

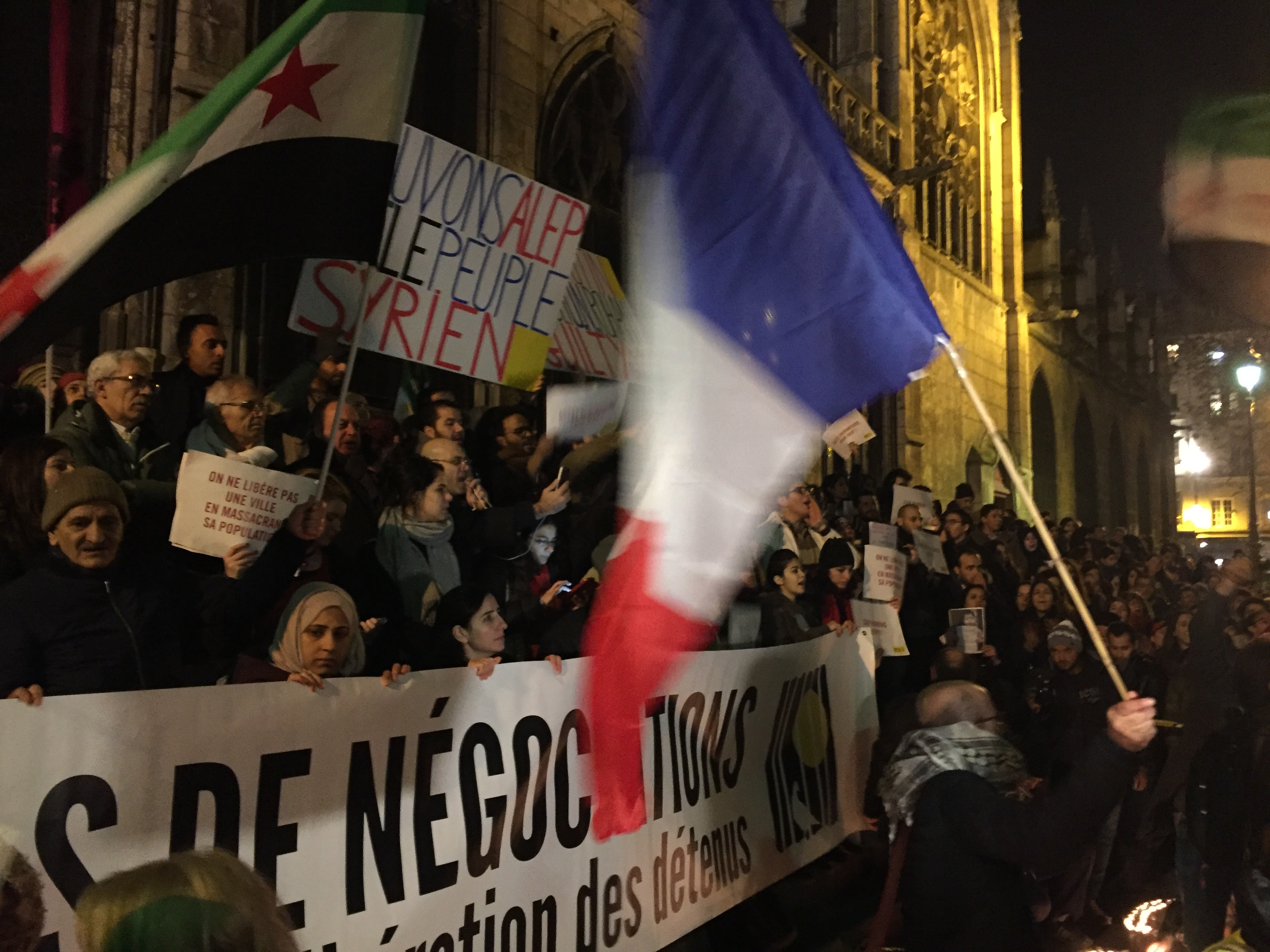
A pro-Syrian Revolution and anti-Assad and anti-Putin protest in Paris, 14 December 2016

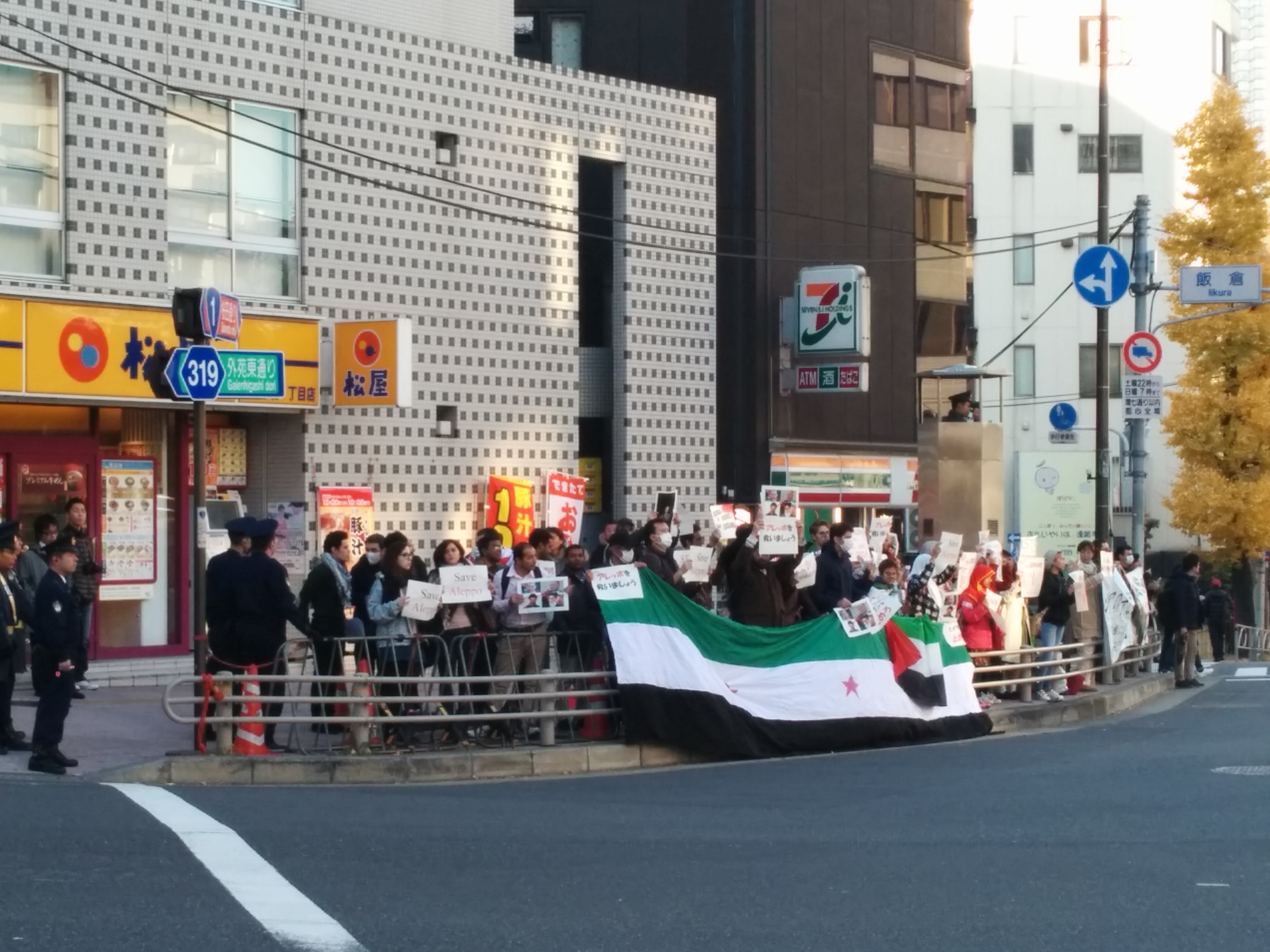
"Save Aleppo" demonstration near Russian Embassy in Tokyo, 17 December 2016

==== Protests in solidarity with opposition forces in Aleppo ====
Rallies and demonstrations intended to show solidarity with Aleppo's besieged civilians, as well as protests against the Syrian government and its Iranian and Russian allies, were held in several cities across the world, organized by numerous groups. In Paris, the Eiffel Tower went dark on 14 December 2016, as a symbol of solidarity, and thousands protested in Paris' Stravinsky Square against Russia's role in the destruction of the city. Qatar cancelled its national day of celebration on 18 December 2016 in solidarity with Aleppo. German government spokesperson Steffen Seibert said that "the cries for help of the people caught up in the fighting for the beleaguered city of Aleppo are a harrowing reminder to the world". He also urged: "There must be an end to the killing and dying in Aleppo." Protests were also held in London, Sarajevo, Istanbul, Jerusalem, Gaza City, and Amman, with some protesters burning pictures of Vladimir Putin because of Russia's role in the siege.

== Timeline ==
- Syrian government supply lines cut between October 2012 and October 2013, before being re-established from the south.
- From mid-to-late 2014, the Syrian government captures the eastern and northeastern approaches to the city.
- Syrian government cuts the northern rebel supply route from Turkey in February 2016, and the last road into the rebel-held part of Aleppo city in July 2016.
- Syrian government siege of rebel-held parts of Aleppo from Summer into Fall 2016, two rebel counteroffensives repelled.
- On 12 December 2016, Syrian government forces had gained control of 98% of the formerly rebel-held east, and rebels were reportedly "near defeat".
- Syrian government and allies' victory reported on 12 December and declared on 13 December.
- City divided between a government-held west and rebel-held east, with two northern districts YPG-held, from July 2012 to November 2016.
- Thirty percent of the UNESCO World Heritage Site Ancient City of Aleppo has been destroyed in the fighting.

== See also ==
- Siege of Homs—Siege of the city of Homs (2012–2014) during the Syrian Civil War
- Rif Dimashq Governorate campaign—Battle for the control of Damascus and its surroundings
- Siege of Eastern Ghouta
- Palmyra offensive (2017)
- Siege of Kobanî
- Siege of Nubl and al-Zahraa—Part of the Battle for Aleppo
- Battle of Benghazi (2014–2017)
- Battle of al-Bab
- Operation Euphrates Shield
- Battle of Mosul (2016–2017)
- Raqqa campaign (2016–2017)
- Siege of Marawi
- List of wars and battles involving al-Qaeda
- 2024 Syrian opposition offensives
- Battle of Aleppo (2024)

== Bibliography ==
- Cafarella, Jennifer; Casagrande, Genevieve (7 October 2015). "Syrian Opposition Guide" (PDF). Backgrounder. Institute for the Study of War.
- Cafarella, Jennifer; Zhou, Jason (2019). "Russia's Dead-End Diplomacy in Syria" (PDF). Institute for the Study of War.
- Pinto, Paulo G. H. (2013). "Syria". In Amar, Paul; Prashad, Vijay (eds.). Dispatches from the Arab Spring: Understanding the Middle East. Minneapolis: University of Minnesota Press. pp. 204–242.
- Lister, Charles R. (2015). The Syrian Jihad: Al-Qaeda, the Islamic State and the Evolution of an Insurgency. Oxford: Oxford University Press. ISBN 978-0-19-061318-1.
