= Mohammed Akkad =

Syrian politician

Mohammed Wahid Akkad

Governor of Aleppo
- In office 16 August 2012 – 22 October 2014
- President: Bashar al-Assad
- Preceded by: Moafaq Khallouf
- Succeeded by: Mohammad Marwan Olabi

Military service
- Allegiance: Ba'athist Syria

Mohammed Wahid Akkad (Arabic: مُحَمَّدُ وَحِيدُ الْعَقَّادِ, romanized: Muḥammad Waḥīd al-ʿAqqād) is a Syrian politician and the former Governor of Aleppo.

Akkad was appointed governor of Aleppo by Syrian President Bashar al-Assad on 16 August 2012 during the Battle of Aleppo replacing Moafaq Khallouf.

During the Syrian civil war Akkad became the primary spokesman for the Syrian government in Aleppo.
