= Carlton Citadel Hotel bombing =

2014 bombing in Syria

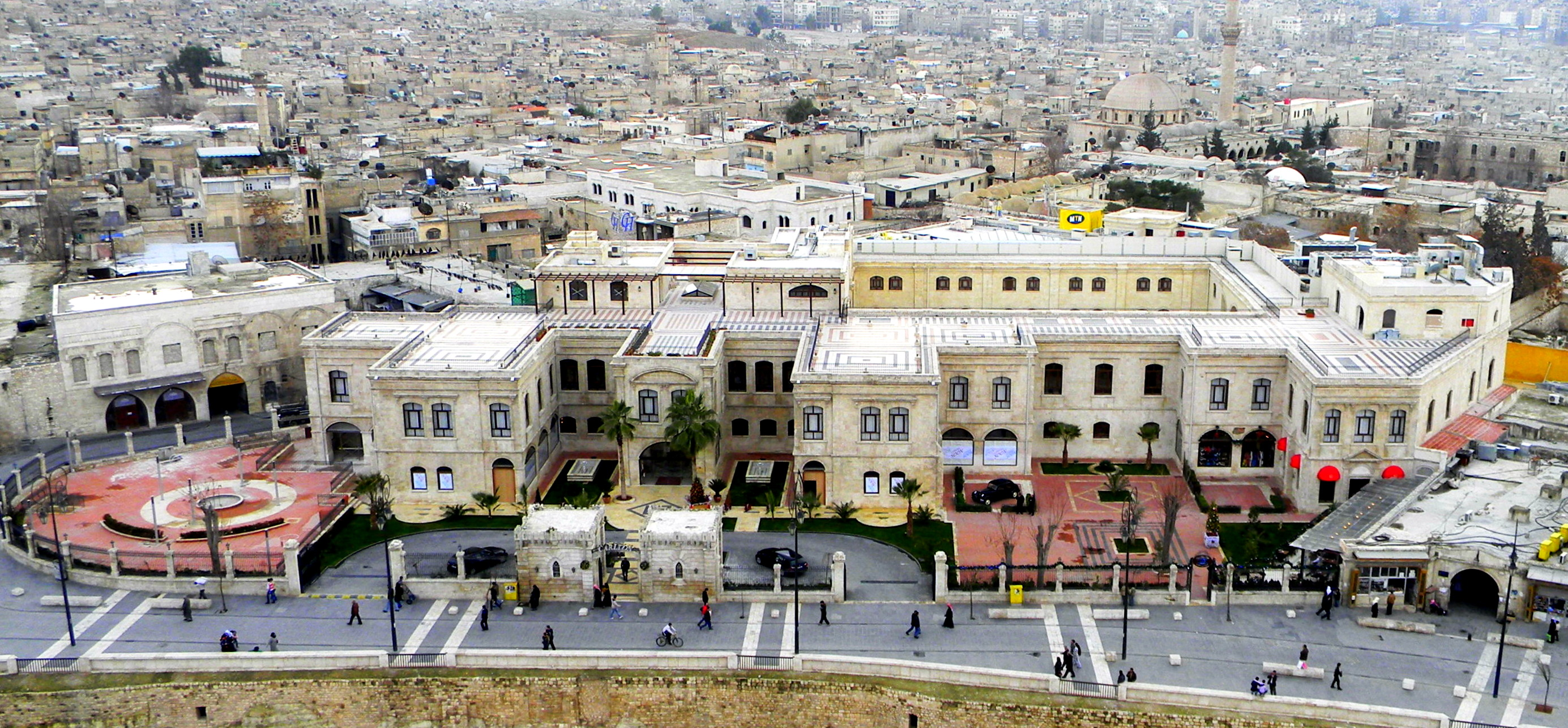
- The Carlton Citadel Hotel before the bombing
- Date: 8 May 2014
- Location: Aleppo, Syria
- Outcome: Destruction of the Carlton Citadel Hotel
- Deaths: 14–50
- Suspects: Islamic Front

On 8 May 2014, a bomb blast leveled the Carlton Citadel Hotel in Aleppo, Syria, killing 14–50.

== Background ==
In the weeks preceding the bombing, the rebel group Islamic Front, and other rebel groups, had been attacking government-held positions within the city. On 6 May, a rebel bombing had occurred near Ma'arat al-Nu'man, killing 30 government operatives.

The Carlton Citadel Hotel occupied a 150-year-old building in which government troops had been stationed (opposition claim). A statement from the Islamic Front referred to the building as a "barracks"; troops had been based there for two years. It was originally built as a hospital for World War I and was afterward renovated and reopened as a hotel.

In February 2014, a similar operation occurred at the Carlton Citadel Hotel; the Islamic Front was also responsible for that blast, having spent two months digging a 300-metre-long (980 ft) tunnel and planting explosives in it as a part of Operation Earthquake. That explosion killed five soldiers and wounded eighteen. The attack resulted in the hotel's "partial collapse".

== Attack ==
Though reports differ, the Islamic Front tunnelled either 400 metres (1,300 ft) or 100 metres (330 ft) under sites in the Old City, and remotely detonated "a large quantity", reportedly 20 tons of explosive material (suggested to be chemical fertilisers) which caused a "huge explosion"; resulting in both the destruction of the hotel and severe damage to neighboring buildings.

The Syrian Observatory for Human Rights reported the death toll as 14 government troops, but the Islamic Front claimed the death toll was 50 in a Twitter statement. Neither gave an explanation as to how they reached their estimate. The Islamic Front also released a video of the attack online.

The bombing left the hotel as a "pile of rubble", and felt similar to an earthquake in relation to the blast size.

== Reactions ==
Reports following the attack blamed "terrorists", a word the government used as a byword for the Islamic armed opposition.
