= 2024 Hama offensive =

HTS-led military operation during the Syrian civil war

- Part of the Northwestern Syria offensive (2024) during the Syrian civil war
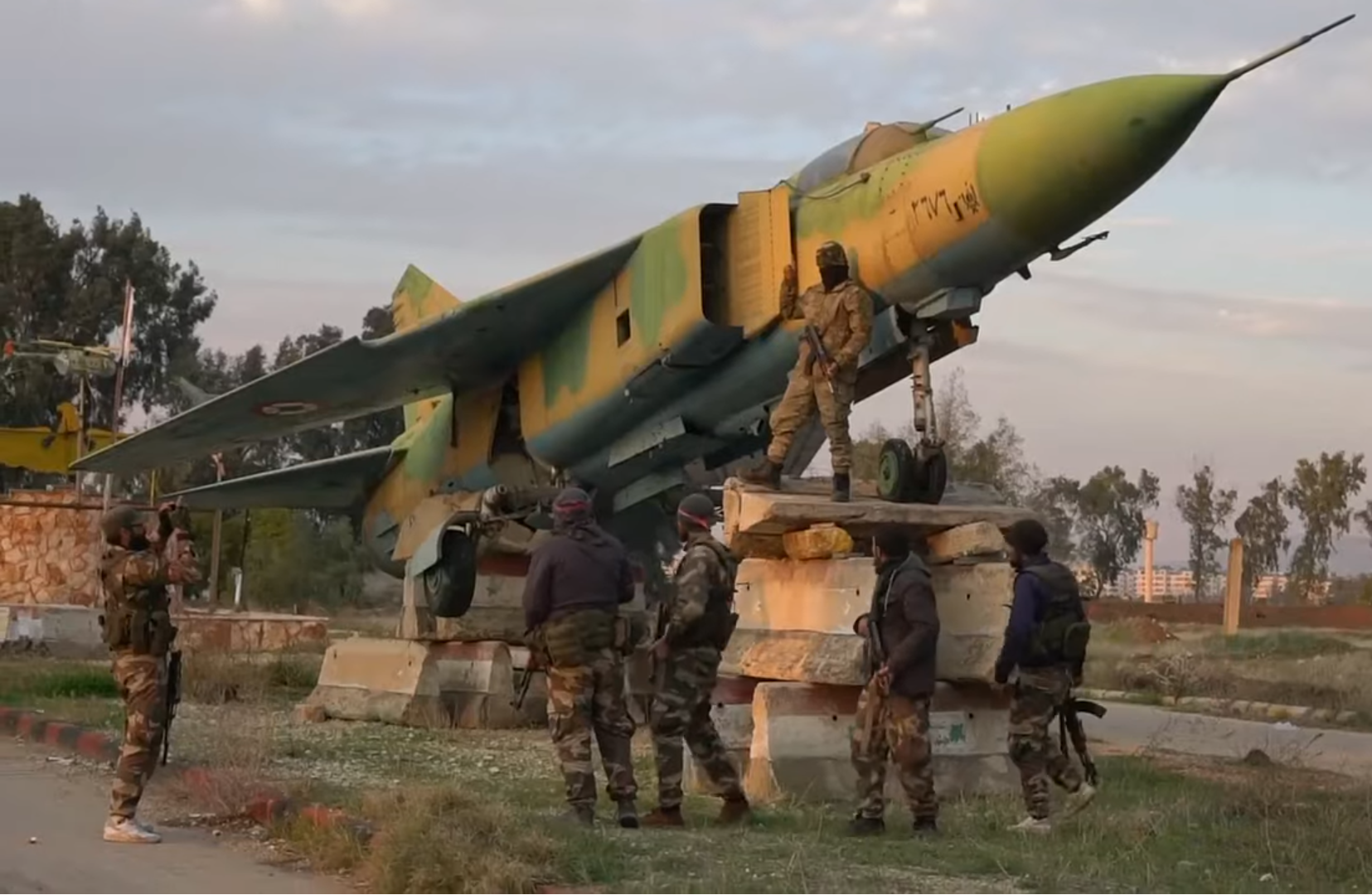
- Syrian rebels at Hama Military Airport
Date	30 November 2024 – 5 December 2024 (5 days)
Location	Hama Governorate, Syria (parts of southern Idlib Governorate, Syria)
Status	Syrian opposition victory
Territorial changes	Rebels capture Hama and multiple towns in the region, including Salamiyah, Kafr Zita, Latamneh, and Morek, as well as the Hama Military Airport

Belligerents
Syrian Salvation Government; (Syrian opposition) Syrian Interim Government	Ba'athist Syria; Russia; Hezbollah

Commanders and leaders
Ahmed al-Sharaa	(Syria) Lt. Gen. Abdul Karim Mahmoud Ibrahim (Syria) Maj. Gen. Suhayl al-Hasan (Syria) Brig. Gen. Adi Ghosa †; Mihrac Ural

Units involved
Military Operations Command; Tahrir al-Sham; Al-Shaheen Brigades; (Syrian opposition) Syrian National Army; Sultan Suleiman Shah Division	Syrian Armed Forces; Syrian Army; 25th SMF Division; Military Intelligence Directorate; Local Defence Forces; Remnants of Nubl and al-Zahraa militias; Fawj al-Imam al-Hujja remnants; Syrian Resistance; Russian Armed Forces; Russian Aerospace Forces; Russian Air Force; Hezbollah; Syrian Hezbollah; Quwat al-Ridha; Imam Hujja Regiment; Liwa al-Imam al-Mahdi; (Palestine) Palestinian militias

Casualties and losses
73+ fighters killed (Syrian opposition) 5 fighters killed	(Syria) 51+ soldiers killed 13+ Iranian-backed militiamen killed
- 17+ civilians killed (Note: 4 by Syrian government airstrikes, 10 by HTS shelling 3) 115,000 people displaced (Note: People were displaced across Idlib and northern Aleppo as per United nations)

The 2024 Hama offensive was a military operation launched by forces of the Syrian Salvation Government (SSG) and Turkish-backed rebel groups of the Syrian Interim Government (SIG) during the 2024 Syrian opposition offensive, a phase of the Syrian civil war. The operation, which was launched by the Military Operations Command, took place in the Hama Governorate.

On 5 December 2024, opposition forces captured Hama.

== Background ==
On 27 November 2024, Syrian opposition groups led by Tahrir al-Sham (HTS) launched an offensive on pro-government forces in northwestern Syria. This marked the first major offensive by any faction in the conflict since the March 2020 Idlib ceasefire. The operation resulted in the rapid capture of dozens of villages by opposition forces and a significant weakening of pro-government defenses. According to the Syrian Observatory for Human Rights, this caused some population displacement towards various Syrian cities, including Hama.

Hama city is a strategic city which had supply lines to loyalist coastal strongholds and is close to areas inhabited by Alawites who had largely backed the Assad government in the past. Furthermore, the city acts as junction connecting all four main areas of Syria: North, south, east and west. It links vital supply and transit lines between Damascus and Aleppo.

== Battle ==
On 30 November 2024, rebels took control of several towns, including Taybat al-Imam, Kafr Zita, Latamneh, and Morek.

=== Opening advances ===
My commanding officer told me to start shooting. He said if you don’t start shooting the enemy, you will be considered a traitor and punished. We kept being told: 'Don't retreat, backup is on the way,' but everyone knew that was a lie. There was no backup.

— Amr, Syrian Army conscript about the fighting north of Hama

Consequently, rebel forces approached the outskirts of Hama and started closing in on the city. Meanwhile, pro-government forces began withdrawing from both the city of Hama and its airbase. An unverified photo started circulating around on early 1 December, showing rebel forces entering the Al-Arba'een neighbourhood in Hama city. Al Jazeera English also reported that rebel forces had entered Hama.

Following the rebel advances, the Syrian government sent reinforcements to stop the advancing rebel forces, along with special forces affiliated with Maj. Gen. Suhayl al-Hasan to strategic locations, including Jabal Zayn al-Abidin, Taybat al-Imam, Qamhana, and Khitab. The Chief of the General Staff of the Army and Syrian Arab Armed Forces, Lt. Gen Abdul Karim Mahmoud Ibrahim, arrived in Hama to oversee the military operations in northern Syria on 1 December 2024. According to Syrian Resistance leader Mihrac Ural, the chief of staff tried to encourage a firm resistance at Hama, and several local pro-government commanders pledged to stand and fight.

The next day, the Syrian Army managed to launch a counteroffensive that regained some territory in the Hama province and halted the rebel advance. Russian airstrikes targeted rural parts of Idlib and Hama under rebel control. According to Syrian state news agency SANA, the army overnight pushed back rebels in the northern countryside of Hama Governorate. Both SANA and the Syrian Observatory for Human Rights claimed that the Syrian Army succeeded in pushing the rebels back. The Syrian Observatory claimed that the reinforcements formed a "strong defensive line" in the north of Hama. The rebels stated that they would push all the way to Damascus.

On 1 December, as part of the renewed rebel advance into the southern Idlib, seven HTS fighters were killed in Khan Shaykhun by booby-trapped missiles in a former SAA warehouse that was abandoned by retreating government forces in the city. On the same day, Brig. Gen. Adi Ghosa, commander of the Military Security branch in Hama city, was killed in a rebel drone strike. Other commanders such as Colonel Makhlouf Makhlouf started to desert as the insurgents kept advancing.

On 2 December, a rebel drone strike targeting a gathering of pro-government military leaders near Jabal Zayn al-Abidin, north of Hama, caused multiple deaths and injuries among their ranks. By the afternoon, clashes between opposition and pro-government forces intensified in Hama Governorate, particularly near the towns of Karnaz and Suran. In the eastern Hama countryside, opposition forces made advances, capturing the town of Qasr Abu Samrah. In the evening, the heaviest clashes since the start of the offensive took place between opposition and pro-government forces in northern Hama region, with Russian and government aircraft carrying out more than 45 airstrikes. Opposition forces took control of the villages of al-Jubain, Tell Malah, Jalamah, al-Jubain, Breidej, Karnaz and al-Karkat, while pro-government forces were able to thwart attempts to advance on Qalaat al-Madiq. Opposition forces' rocket shelling of Hama city killed eight civilians. Clashes also occurred on the frontline in the Al-Ghab Plain, amid a failed HTS offensive where at least ten HTS members were killed attacking SAA positions.

=== Fighting on the outskirts ===
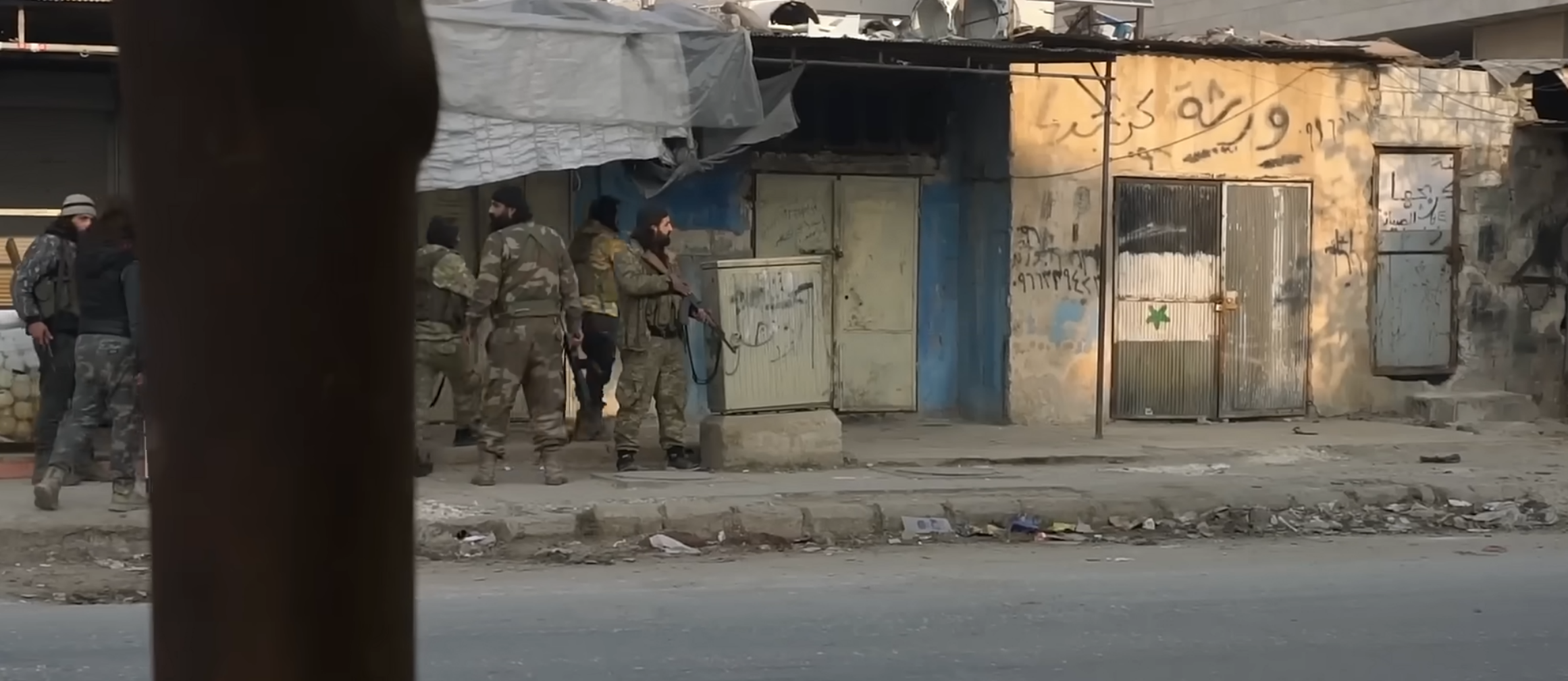
Rebels secure the perimeter in the Hama region, 8 December 2024

On 3 December, rebel forces continued their advance on the pro-government forces, capturing the towns of Taybat al-Imam, Halfaya, Soran, and Maardis. Fighting intensified in the evening between opposition and pro-government forces, as the rebels took control of more than 10 town of villages and reached the outskirts of Hama. At least 17 SAA soldiers and 8 HTS fighters were killed in heavy clashes north of Hama. Two civilians were also killed by HTS shelling in the city.

Anas Alkharboutli, a photographer working for DPA, was killed in an airstrike in Morek, near Hama.

On 4 December, SAA forces launched a counter-offensive to regain possession of the tracked military vehicles academy, 18 km to the northeast of Hama city. Another offensive was conducted by HTS forces on the village of Al-Kareem, adjacent to Al-Bared village near Joureen, where SAA forces repelled the rebel attacks. In the day of offensives on the Hama frontline, at least 48 HTS fighters, 5 SNA fighters and 34 SAA soldiers were killed. By the evening, opposition forces had cut off the roads connecting Hama to Raqqa and Aleppo and took control of the villages of Shaykh Hilal, Al-Saan, and Sarouj in the eastern Hama country side. Heavy clashes continued into the night with the rebels capturing the towns of Khitab and Mubarakat, while fighting persisted in Jabal Zayn al-Abidin. A Local Defence Forces veteran later claimed that the loyalist forces at Khitab were overrun because a contingent of Syrian Army tanks defected to the rebels, attacking still-loyal militia forces from behind.

At the end of the day, rebel forces were able to surround Hama city from three directions and were about four kilometers away. Pro-government forces were still in control of the strategic Hama-Homs route and brought "large military convoys" to the embattled city in the past 24 hours. In the western Hama countryside, fighting approached the Latakia region, mainly populated by Alawites.

=== Fall of Hama ===
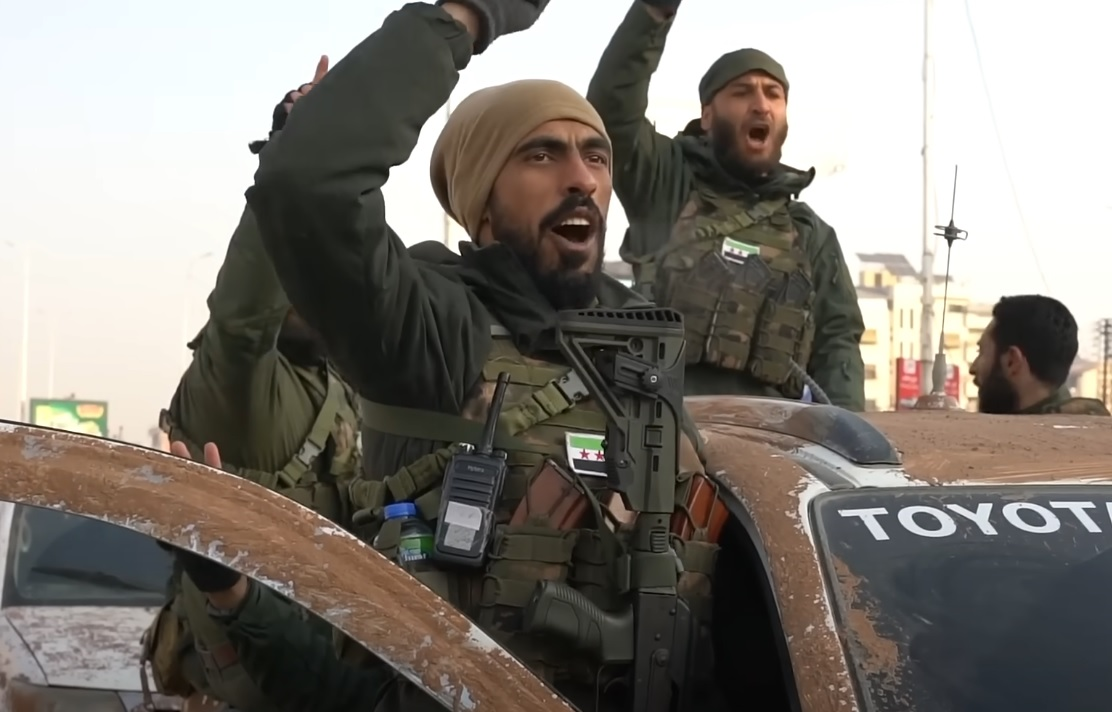
HTS rebels celebrate the complete takeover of Hama city

On 5 December, opposition forces entered the northeastern part of Hama city after capturing the 66th Brigade base east of Hama city. Airstrikes by pro-government forces were reported on the eastern side, concurrently with fighting opposition forces. The Turkish-backed Sultan Suleiman Shah Division led by Muhammad al-Jassem (Abu Amsha) joined the fight for control over the city.

On the same day, SAA forces withdrew from Hama city. Rebel forces also entered Hama's central prison and freed hundreds of inmates who they said were "wrongfully detained" by the regime. By the afternoon, opposition forces had established full control over the city and adjacent military airport. In a statement, Syrian government said that its "military units had been redeployed and repositioned outside the city" to "preserve the lives of civilians" after opposition forces were able to "penetrate several parts of the city", and "significant" number of Hama residents fled.

=== Subsequent opposition advances ===
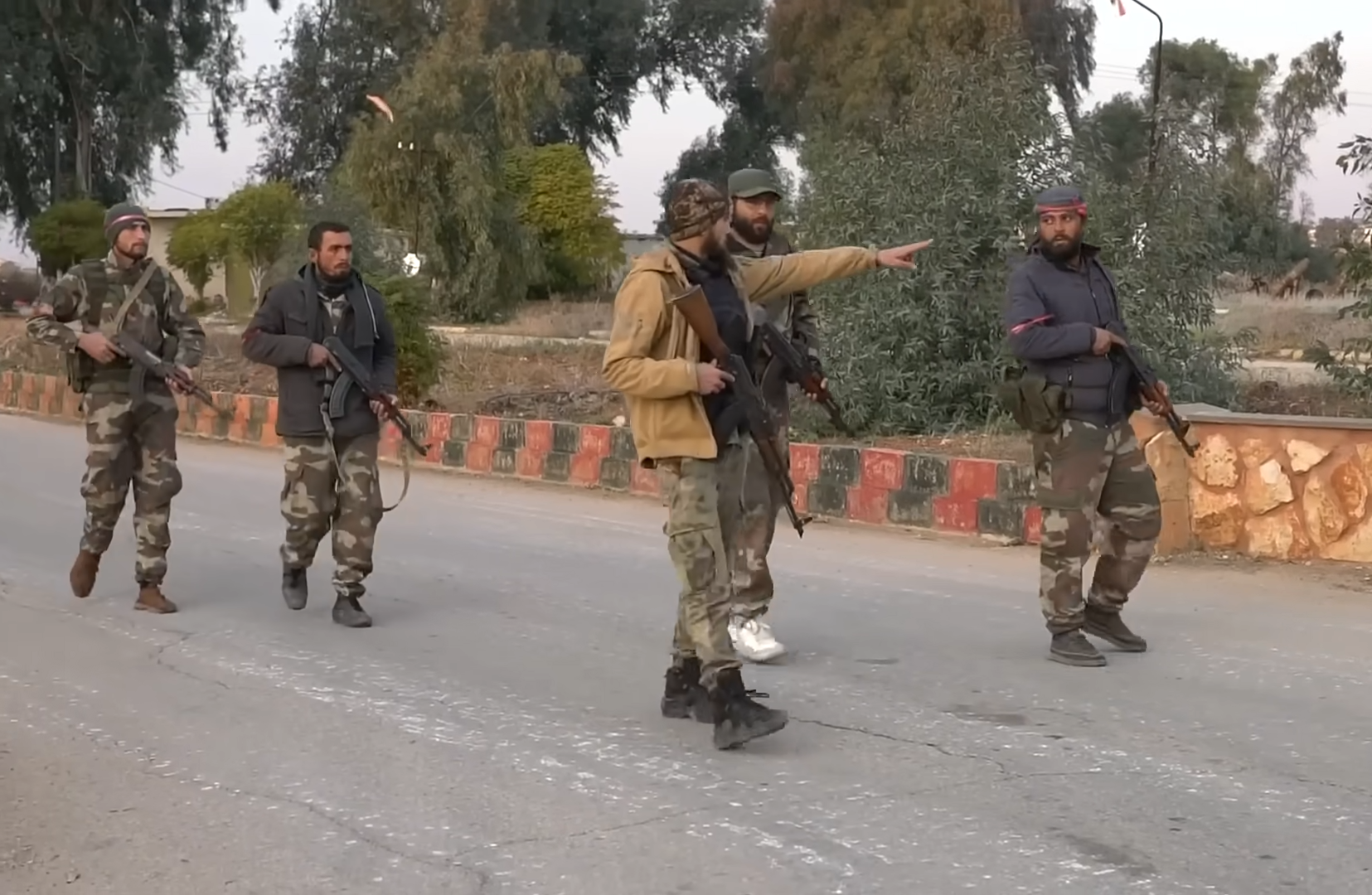
HTS Rebels coordinating at Hama, 8 December 2024

On 5 December 2024, pro-government forces withdrew from the cities of Salamiyah and Talbiseh towards the city of Homs, hours after their withdrawal from Hama as rebels approached the former towns outskirts. In the evening, opposition forces entered Salamiyah without fighting, after reaching an agreement with the city's elders and the religious Ismaili council.

== Aftermath ==
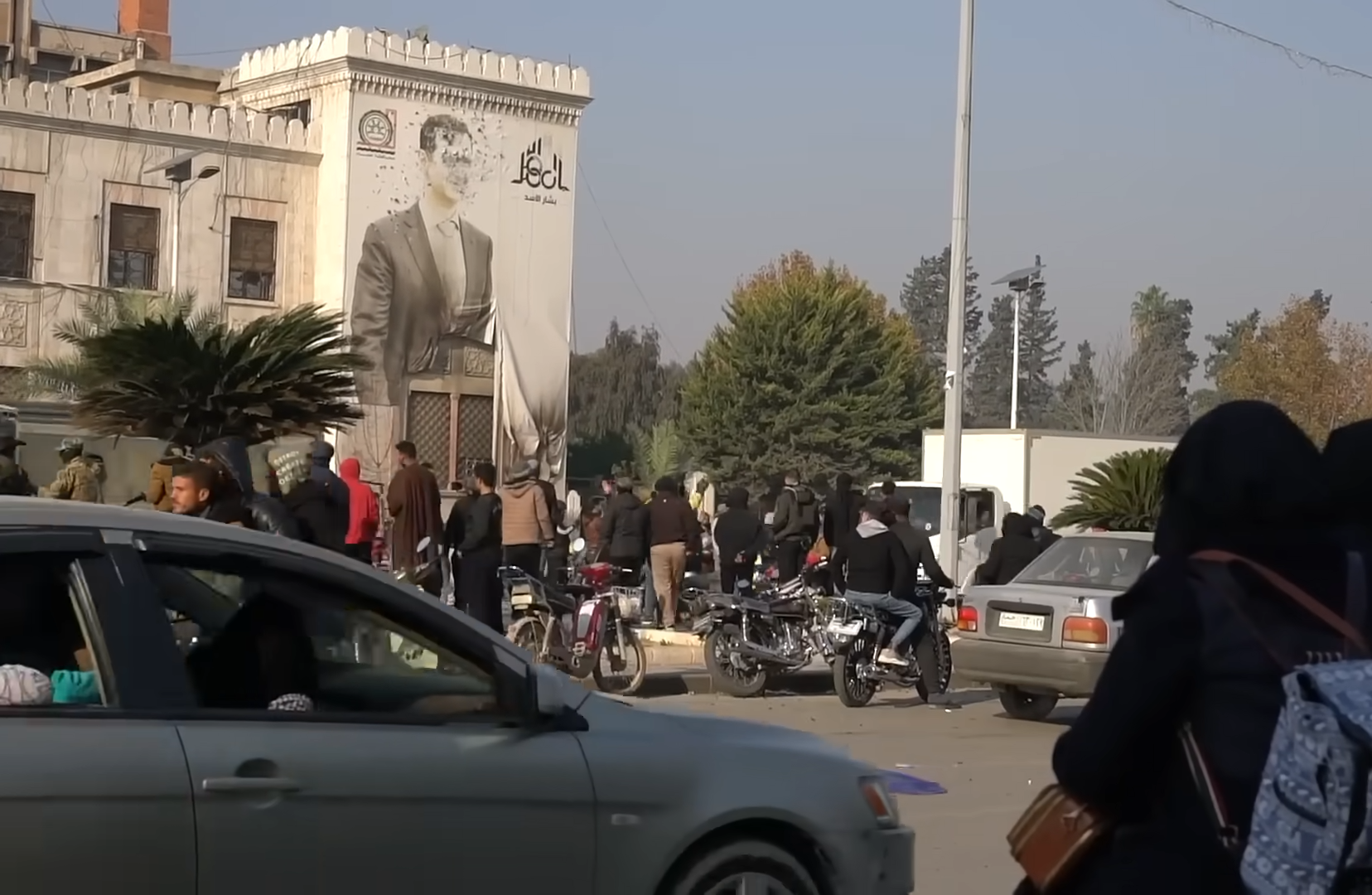
SItuation at Hama post-government collapse. Onlookers watch as a poster with the face of Bashar al-Assad is riddled with bullets

After the fall of Hama, the war was widely considered lost for the Syrian government. Pro-Assad Iraqi militias were ordered to retreat from Syria after 5 December, as their officers concluded that effective resistance was no longer possible. Government loyalists publicly downplayed the event, with Minister of Defense Ali Mahmoud Abbas describing it as a mere "tactical measure", or spread conspiracy theories about a fictitious counter-attack by Syrian paratroopers encircling the insurgents in the city. The Ba'athist leadership attempted to organize a defense of Damascus, but the city fell on 8 December.

After the fall of the Assad regime, reporting attributed to unnamed former government loyalists posited that betrayal by some high-ranking officers and foreign allies was the main driver for the loss of the battle.

== Reactions ==
- (Syria) Assad regime: The Syrian Ministry of Defense stated in a statement that: "Our armed forces are engaged in fierce battles to repel and thwart the violent and successive attacks launched by terrorist organizations on the city of Hama from various axes." It concluded that: "The General Command of the Army and Armed Forces will continue to carry out its national duty in reclaiming the areas that terrorist organizations have entered.
- Syrian Salvation Government: HTS leader Abu Mohammad al-Julani said his forces entered Hama to "cleanse a 40-year old wound," referring to the 1982 Hama massacre by forces of Hafez al-Assad's regime. The rebels vowed to advance further south to Homs and called on the city's inhabitants to rise up in "revolution against oppression and tyranny".

== See also ==
- Southern Syria offensive (2024)
- Palmyra offensive (2024)
