= Ratyan =

Ratyan رتيان
- Village
- Location within Syria
- Coordinates: 36°20′47.8″N 37°5′31.7″E
- Country: Syria
- Governorate: Aleppo Governorate
- District: A'zaz District
- Nahiyah: Nubl

Population (2004 census)
  - Total: 2,216
- Time zone: UTC+2 (EET)
  - Summer (DST): UTC+3 (EEST)

Ratyan (Arabic: رتيان) is a town in northern Syria, administratively part of the A'zaz District of Aleppo Governorate, located northwest of Aleppo. Nearby localities include Mayer to the northwest, Al-Zahraa and Bayanoun to the west and Tell Jabin to the east. According to the Syria Central Bureau of Statistics, Ratyan had a population of 2,216 in the 2004 census.

== During the Syrian Civil War ==
Ratyan was an opposition-held town from early in the Syrian Civil War.

ARA News reported that pro-government forces, backed by the Lebanese militias of Hezbollah and the Iranian Revolutionary Guards, had taken control of Ratyan by 17 February 2015, but that rebels of the Levant Front regained control of the village that evening, with one Nour al-Din al-Zenki Movement commander, Hassan Maykah, killed in the fighting. The Times, however, reported that rebels regained the village on 19 February, after several days of heavy fighting, capturing 32 government soldiers.

There was heavy fighting in Ratyan in early 2016 as part of the Northern Aleppo offensive (February 2016). Pro-government Al-Masdar News reported that the government recaptured the village on 5 February 2016, although the Syrian Observatory for Human Rights reported that half the town had been retaken by rebels that day, and The Independent and The Guardian reported fighting continuing on 7 February.
