= Nubl Subdistrict =

Nubl Subdistrict ناحية نبل
- Subdistrict
- Location of Nubl Subdistrict within Aleppo Governorate

- Location in Syria
- Country: Syria
- Governorate: Aleppo
- District: Azaz District
- Seat: Nubl

Area
  - Total: 174.79 km^{2} (67.49 sq mi)

Population (2004)
  - Total: 51,948
  - Density: 297.20/km^{2} (769.75/sq mi)
- Geocode: SY020404

Nubl Subdistrict (Arabic: ناحية نبل, romanized: nāḥiyah Nubl) is a subdistrict of Azaz District in northwestern Aleppo Governorate of northern Syria. Administrative centre is the city of Nubl.

At the 2004 census, the subdistrict had a population of 51,948.

== Cities, towns and villages ==
Cities, towns and villages of Nubl Subdistrict
PCode	Name	Population
C1655	Nubl	21,039
C1646	al-Zahraa	13,780
C1656	Mayer	4,772
C1649	Bayanoun	3,824
C1651	Ratyan	2,216
C1652	Kafin	1,304
C1647	Hardatnin	1,266
C1645	Zuq al-Kabir	1,076
C1653	Maarset Elkhan	802
C1648	Burj Elqas	801
C1650	Bashmra	592
C1654	Mayasa	476
