= 2024 Homs offensive =

HTS-led military operation during the Syrian civil war

- Part of the 2024 Syrian opposition offensive during the Syrian civil war
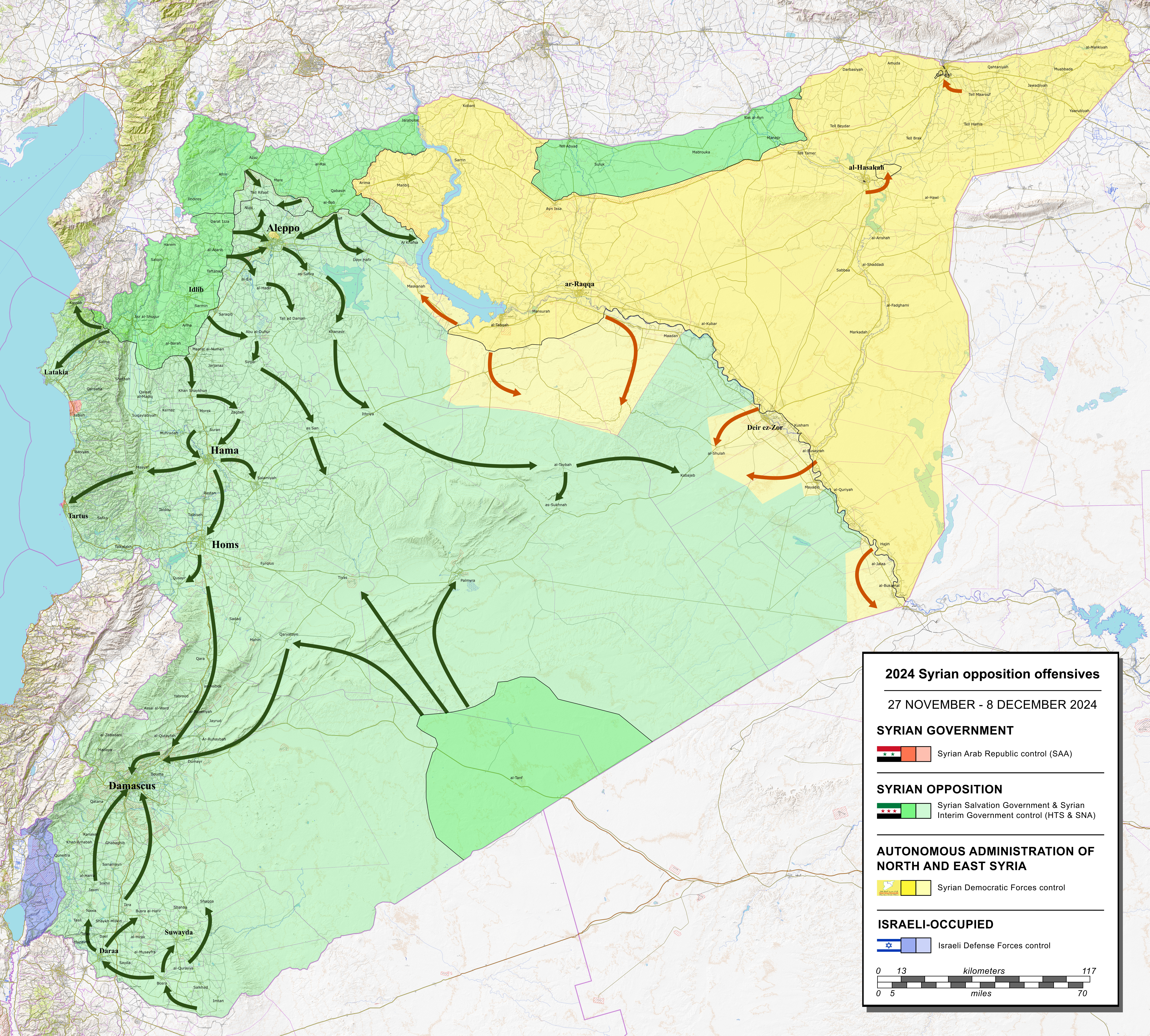
- Map of the offensive in and outside of Homs city Controlled by the Syrian Arab Republic Controlled by the Syrian opposition
Date	5 December 2024 – 8 December 2024 (3 days)
Location	Homs Governorate, Syria
Result	Syrian opposition victory
Territorial changes	Syrian opposition forces capture Homs and multiple towns in the region

Belligerents
Syrian Opposition; Syrian Salvation Government; (Syrian opposition) Syrian Interim Government	(Ba'athist Syria) Syrian Government; Russia; Hezbollah; Syrian Hezbollah

Commanders and leaders
Ahmed al-Sharaa; Hassan Abdul Ghani	(Ba'athist Syria) Suhayl al-Hasan

Units involved
Military Operations Command; Hayat Tahrir al-Sham; Al-Shaheen Brigades; (Syrian opposition) Syrian National Army	Syrian Armed Forces; Syrian Army; 25th SMF Division; 27th Division; Local Defence Forces; Remnants of Nubl and al-Zahraa militias; Fawj al-Imam al-Hujja remnants; Russian Armed Forces; Russian Aerospace Forces; Russian Air Force; Hezbollah; (Hezbollah) Redwan Force; Syrian Hezbollah; Quwat al-Ridha (surrendered); Imam Hujja Regiment; Liwa al-Imam al-Mahdi; (Palestine) Palestinian militias

Strength
Unknown	2,000 fighters, 150+ APCs (Hezbollah)

The 2024 Homs offensive was a military operation launched by forces of the Syrian Salvation Government (SSG) during the 2024 Syrian opposition offensive, a phase of the Syrian Civil War. The operation was launched by the Military Operations Command following its capture of Hama on 5 December 2024 during the 2024 Hama offensive. The offensive ended in the city being captured by opposition forces on the night of 7/8 December after government forces abandoned the city.

== Background ==
On 5 November 2024, Israeli airstrikes targeted Hezbollah weapon depots in Al Qusayr city.

On 16 November 2024, a second round of Israeli airstrikes against Hezbollah targets the al-Qusayr region occurred. Syrian military sites were also targeted. The strikes destroyed several bridges, including the one over the Orontes River that connects Qusayr and several towns in Homs' eastern and western countrysides.

On 27 November 2024, Syrian opposition groups led by Tahrir al-Sham (HTS) launched an offensive in northwestern Syria on the forces of the Bashar al-Assad government. This marked the first major offensive by any faction in the conflict since the March 2020 Idlib ceasefire.

On 5 December, opposition forces captured Hama. Upon hearing the news of the rebel advance, thousands of residents of Homs fled the city as opposition forces pushed closer.

== Offensive ==
Following the fall of Hama on 5 December 2024, opposition forces positioned themselves approximately 40 kilometers from the Homs city center. Government forces reportedly withdrew from al-Rastan, while the city of Talbiseh also fell from government control in the wake of opposition advancements. Opposition forces conducted drone strikes against the Syrian Arab Army's 27th Division near Tir Ma'la village. Still-loyal units from the north continued attempts to set up defenses before Hams, including remnants of Local Defence Forces from the Aleppo region. However, most pro-government units just melted away. One loyalist militiaman later bitterly argued that his comrades still fought, while the Syrian Army just fled and high-ranking officers defected to the insurgents.

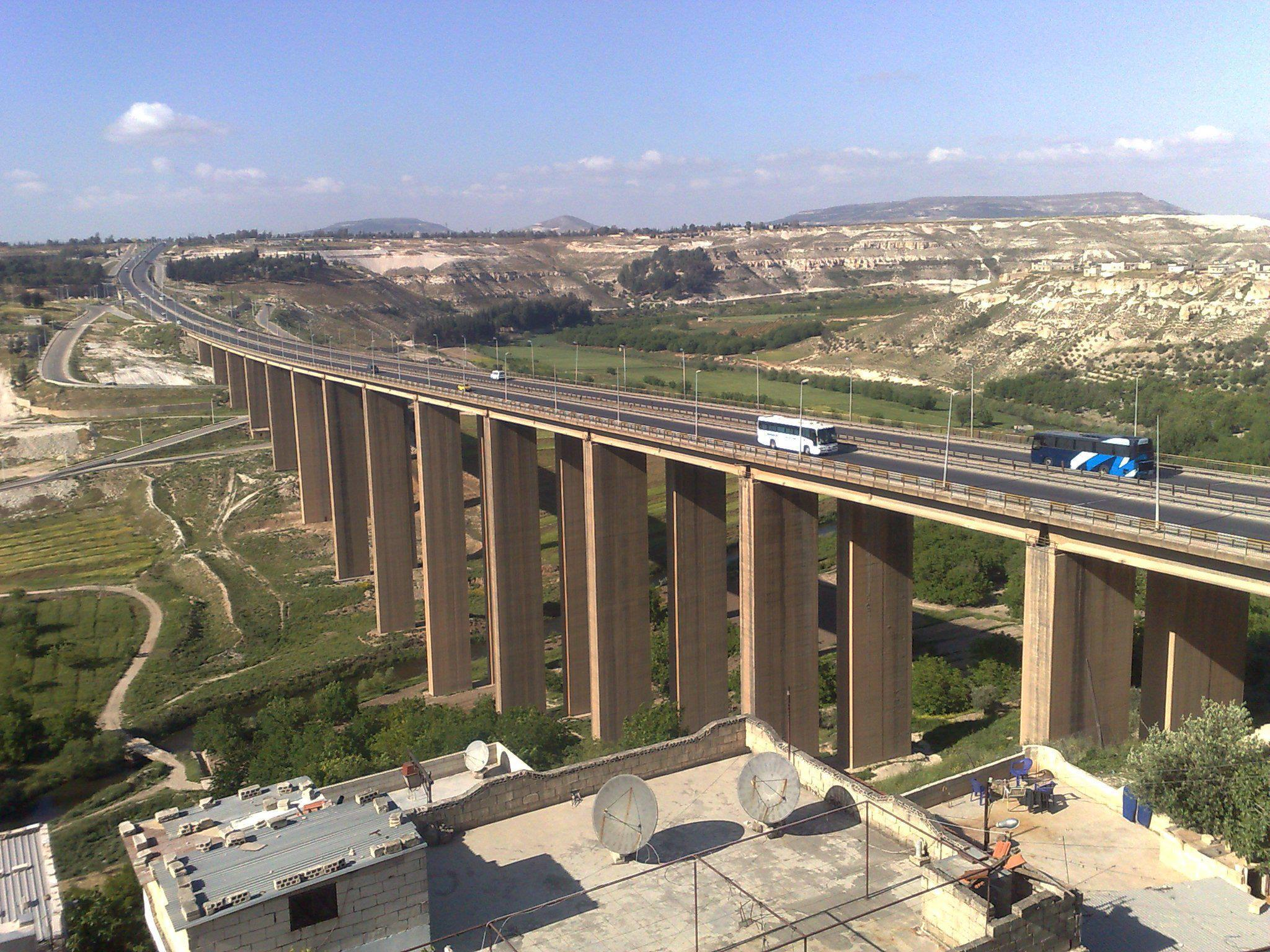
Al-Rastan bridge, which was damaged by a Russian Aerospace Forces airstrike to prevent HTS and allied forces from advancing.

Local militant groups captured the engineering battalion facility of the SAA on al-Rastan's outskirts, where they acquired military vehicles and ammunition supplies. SAR-aligned warplanes conducted approximately ten strikes targeting the northern periphery of al-Rastan and areas surrounding the main bridge connecting Hama to Homs. The SAA also struck rebel positions in Talbiseh with artillery fire and missiles for the first time in several years. SAA authorities established earthen barriers along the Homs-Hama highway approaching Talbiseh in order to isolate Rastan and Talbiseh from Homs city. A significant SAA convoy of over 200 vehicles carrying weapons and ammunition was redirected to Homs city to reinforce positions in the Al-Waer district and near military educational facilities. In an attempt to stop the rebel advances, the Russian Aerospace Forces launched an airstrike on the Al-Rastan bridge of M5 Motorway across Orontes River, which connects Homs and Hama.

On 6 December 2024, opposition forces captured Al-Rastan, Talbiseh and Al-Dar al-Kabirah, and approached the outskirts of Homs. Meanwhile, pro-government forces withdrew from several towns north of the city, including Teir Maalah, Al-Zaafaraniyah, Al-Majdal, Deir Ful, Asilah, Farhaniyya, Al-Wazi'iya Al-Ghasibiyya, Al-Makramiyya and Izz al-Din. By the afternoon, pro-government forces had reportedly completely withdrawn from Homs towards the city of Latakia, with only local pro-government gunmen remaining in the Shia majority neighborhoods of the city. The Syrian Defense Ministry denied these reports. Government forces called an airstrike against the Al-Rastan bridge on the Homs-Hama highway known as the M45 highway in an attempt to cut off both Hama and Homs from the opposition forces and also to slow the rebels advances. Airstrikes on Homs eastern suburbs killed 20 civilians.

That day, Israeli airstrikes targeted two border crossings with Lebanon, Arida and Jousieh in Al-Qusayr countryside in south-western Homs, which were used as weapons transfer hubs for pro-government Hezbollah forces.

Pro-government forces moved "large reinforcements" near Homs city that day and into the night of 7 December 2024.

On 7 December 2024, HTS-led rebels had reached the outskirts of Homs city amid heavy fighting. At least seven civilians were killed in airstrikes and artillery fire. Hezbollah announced sending 2,000 fighters to Al-Qusayr, but had not yet clashed with rebel forces. By afternoon, Reuters reported that rebels entered suburbs of the city from the north and the east. By night, rebels took over Homs Central Prison in the northern part of the city, releasing hundreds of detainees. Dozens of Hezbollah fighters from the elite Redwan force fled Homs after a decision made by the Syrian army that the city could no longer be defended.

In a separate event, the US-backed Syrian Free Army advanced in the eastern Homs countryside, opening a new front against the government. The rebels captured Palmyra, Al-Sukhnah and Al-Qaryatayn. The rebels also captured the strategically located mountain Jabal al-Ghurab.

By the early morning of 8 December 2024, the Syrian rebels declared that they had fully captured the city of Homs, effectively cutting Latakia Governorate off from the rest of the country. Rebels continued their advance into Homs Governorate and captured Al-Qusayr, after hundreds of Hebzollah fighters crossed back into Lebanon. Shortly after, the Israeli Air Force struck one of the Hezbollah convoys at the crossing. Some loyalist contingents attempted to retreat to Damascus to continue resistance, only to discover that the capital had already fallen.
