= Northern Aleppo offensive (February 2016) =

Part of the Battle of Aleppo and the Syrian Civil War

- Part of the Battle of Aleppo and the Syrian civil war
- Advances made in Northern Aleppo from February 1-16, 2016
Date	1–16 February 2016 (2 weeks and 1 day)
Location	Northern Aleppo Governorate, Syria
Result	SDF, Syrian army and allies victory
Territorial changes	The Syrian Army and its allies break the siege of Nubl and Al-Zahraa; The main rebel supply route from Turkey is cut; The Syrian Army and its allies capture Mayer and nine villages, reaching 25 km away from the Syrian–Turkish border; The Kurdish-led SDF captures Tell Rifaat, 13 villages, and the Menagh Military Airbase

Belligerents
(Syria) Syrian Arab Republic; Iran; Russia Allied militias: Kata'ib Hezbollah; Harakat Hezbollah al-Nujaba; Badr Organization; Liwa Fatemiyoun; Hezbollah; Liwa al-Quds Autonomous Administration of North and East Syria	Army of Aleppo; Ahrar ash-Sham; Free Syrian Army; Jaysh al-Islam; Al-Nusra Front; Turkey (mainly against SDF); Supported by: Saudi Arabia; Qatar

Commanders and leaders
(Iran) Maj. Gen. Qasem Soleimani (Head of Quds Force) (Iran) Brig. Gen. Mohsen Ghajarian † (Syria) Lt. Gen. Ali Abdullah Ayyoub (Syria) Gen. Hafez Ahmed Al-Abood † (Syria) Col. Nawaf Hamad Al-Khatib † (Russia) Col. Gen. Aleksandr Dvornikov; Haydar Fariz † Abdo Ibrahim (Afrin Canton defense minister); Sewsen Bîrhat (Aleppo YPJ commander); Wissi Hijazi ("Abu Uday Menagh") (Army of Revolutionaries commander); Zakur al-Diri (POW) (former Mountain Hawks Brigade commander, defected to the Army of Revolutionaries)	Hashim al-Sheikh (overall rebel Aleppo commander); Nimr al-Shukri † (Ahrar ash-Sham Aleppo commander); Abu Ahmed al Abdullah † (al-Nusra Front Tell Rifaat commander); Abu Mustapha al-Saleh (Levant Front); Zekeriya Karsli (Levant Front); Ismail Nadef (POW) (Conquest Brigade)

Units involved
Syrian Armed Forces; Syrian Army; 4th Armoured Division; 154th Brigade; Republican Guard; Local Defence Forces; Baqir Brigade; National Defence Forces; Syrian Air Force; Armed Forces of the Islamic Republic of Iran; IRGC; IRGC Ground Forces; Quds Force; Russian Armed Forces; Russian Aerospace Forces; Wagner Group; Syrian Hezbollah; National Ideological Resistance; Imam al Hujja Regiment; Syrian Democratic Forces; YPG; YPJ; Army of Revolutionaries	Free Syrian Army; Nour al-Din al-Zenki Movement; 101st Infantry Division; 16th Division; Al-Fauj al-Awwal; Mountain Hawks Brigade; Sultan Murad Division; Fastaqim Union; Muntasir Billah Brigade; Sham Legion; Levant Front; Conquest Brigade; Mu'tasim Division; Turkish Land Forces

Casualties and losses
SAA & allies: 143 killed (48 Iraqis, 14 IRGC, 3 Hezbollah); SDF: 18 killed Total: 161 killed	Fighting SAA & allies: 309–335 killed Fighting SDF: 88 killed Total: 397–423 killed
- 119–168 civilians killed (one Lebanese journalist); 50,000 civilians displaced

The Northern Aleppo offensive (February 2016) refers to a military operation launched northwest of Aleppo in early February 2016 by the Syrian Arab Army and its allies. The offensive successfully broke the three-year Siege of Nubl and Al-Zahraa, effectively cutting off the main supply route of the Syrian rebels from Turkey.

== Preparations ==
During the latter part of January 2016, reports began circulating of significant Syrian government reinforcements being sent to Aleppo from Damascus, in preparation for a new offensive. Almost 3,000 additional soldiers were deployed.

== Offensive ==
=== Breaking the siege of Nubl and Al-Zahraa ===
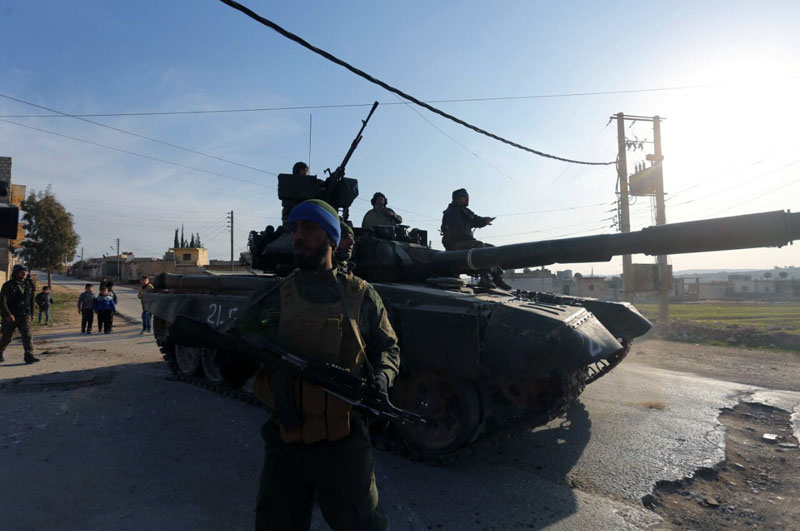
Pro-government forces in the Nubl and Al-Zahraa pocket after breaking the siege.

On 1 February 2016, a joint force consisting of the 4th Mechanized Division, NDF, Hezbollah, Kata'ib Hezbollah and Harakat Hezbollah al-Nujaba (Iranian-backed Iraqi Shi'ite paramilitary organisations), attacked rebel positions around the towns of Duwayr al-Zeytoun and Bashkoy.

After securing Duwayr Al-Zeitoun, the SAA and its allies turned north and routed rebels from the town of Tal-Jibbin within the span of two hours. Spearheaded by Hezbollah units, the rebels were next struck at the Al-Mallah farms, where they made a determined defence.

Citing this operation, the opposition groups at the Geneva Syria peace talks formally announced on 1 February 2016 that they had opted out and the talks were suspended. Rebel commanders said they hoped the collapse of the peace talks would "convince their foreign backers, states including Turkey and Saudi Arabia, that it was time to send them more powerful and advanced weapons, including anti-aircraft missiles". One rebel leader said he expects "something new, God willing" after the failure of the Geneva talks.

By 2 February, government forces had pushed north of Tal Jibbin and secured the town of Hardatin. Continuing their assault, the army momentarily captured Ratyan before being repulsed by a rebel counter-attack later in the day. A later effort managed to push deep into Ratyan, bringing 75 percent of the town under government control. In addition to the government advance from the east, the fighters surrounded in the Nubl-Zahra pocket launched a complementary offensive from the west and managed to take some ground.

The village of Muarrassat al-Khan was attacked by government forces in a pincer movement on 3 February. The fall of this village opened up a land bridge and broke the siege of Nubl and Al-Zahraa the same day. Residents thanked Assad, Iran and Hezbollah in celebratory scenes from the towns broadcast by Hezbollah's al-Manar. 11 rebel commanders were killed in the operation.

=== SDF assault launched and the battle for Ratyan ===
On 4 February, the YPG-led Syrian Democratic Forces (SDF) also launched an offensive against the rebels in northern Aleppo and took control of Ziyara and Khreiybeh, north of Nubl. At the same time, government troops took the towns of Mayer and Kafr Naya.

By 5 February, Al-Masdar News and Al-Mayadeen reported that the military had taken control of Ratyan, while the rebels re-established control of Kafr Naya after a counter-attack from the north. According to ARA News, the rebel Levant Front evacuated its headquarters in Ratyan after more than ten of its fighters were killed and a dozen more were wounded.

The Syrian Observatory for Human Rights reported that the western half of Ratyan had been retaken by rebels that day, and The Independent and The Guardian reported fighting continuing on 7 February.

By the evening of 5 February, the army reached positions overlooking Bayanoun, with clashes continuing in the village. Thousands of people in the area fled towards the Turkish border.

The next day, government forces captured all of Ratyan, as well as the Bashkoy-Ratyan road, after securing the soap factory. In all, Al-Masdar reported that 140–160 fighters on both sides were killed in the battle for the village the previous day, including 100 rebels and 60 government fighters. Among the government casualties were General Hafez Ahmed Al-Abood and Hezbollah commander Haydar Fariz. According to Al-Masdar, at least one of the dead rebel fighters was a child soldier, as the rebels were reportedly sending more child fighters to the front line due to a lack of manpower. Ali Yousef Dasho, described by Syrian government media as a "Lebanese war reporter", was killed while covering the battle for Ratyan from the government side, as was confirmed by Hezbollah to Russian media.

Later on 6 February, the YPG and the Army of Revolutionaries captured two villages, a hill and the al-Faisal mill. One village was Al-Alqamiyeh, near the rebel-held Menagh Air Base, while further south YPG-led forces seized the quarry and Talat Al-Firan hill that overlook Tannurah. The town of Menagh was hit by Russian bombers after the SDF reportedly warned the rebels to hand the town over to avoid the strikes. The SDF also reached the southern entrance to the town of Deir Jamal. However, the SDF also allowed 80 fighters from the Army of Conquest to pass through Afrin to reinforce the rebels in the Azaz area the next day.

At the start of 7 February, government troops were seven kilometers from rebel-held Tell Rifaat. They then advanced and captured the village of Kiffin, bringing them to within five kilometers of Tell Rifaat, after which they proceeded to attack Kafr Naya from two different flanks. Concurrently, the SDF seized three villages during the day, including Ajar and its hill, Maraanaz and Deir Jamal. During the SDF's advance on Deir Jamal, a local Mountain Hawks Brigade unit defected to the Army of Revolutionaries and handed over Deir Jamal to the SDF. The SDF also took full control of the road south of Deir Jamal, preventing government forces from advancing on Tell Rifaat via this route. The army and the SDF reportedly set up a joint checkpoint near Kiffin to avoid potential skirmishes. Heavy Russian air-strikes continued against Menagh throughout the following night.

=== Capture of the Menagh Military Airbase ===
As of 8 February, a rebel handover of Menagh and its air base to the Kurdish forces had still not taken place due to a dispute between two rebel groups, while south of the base the SDF captured Kafr Antun. Meanwhile, the army began an attack in the direction of Tannurah, south of Nubl and Al-Zahraa, which led to fighting in the hills overlooking the village. The attack was repelled. Nimr Shukri, Ahrar ash-Sham's Aleppo commander, was killed during the day.

On 9 February, SDF forces (YPG and Jaysh al-Thuwar) captured Al-Mashtal, northwest of the Menagh air base. Further south, a rebel convoy consisting of 100 vehicles carrying reinforcements and ammunition was seen traveling from Idlib towards Aleppo. Later, a rebel convoy, including more than 20 vehicles, was reportedly destroyed by the Syrian Air Force on the Aleppo-Latakia Highway (M-4 Highway).

On 10 February, fighting continued in the Menagh area and at the air base, despite claims the previous night the base and its village were captured by the SDF. More clashes took place around Tannurah. That evening, the Menagh military airport and the village of Menagh were captured by the SDF, after the base was hit with at least 30 Russian air strikes. Meanwhile, after a three-day-long battle, Army, NDF and Hezbollah units broke through rebel positions around Kafr Naya and captured the village.

=== SDF push north, government push south and Turkish shelling ===
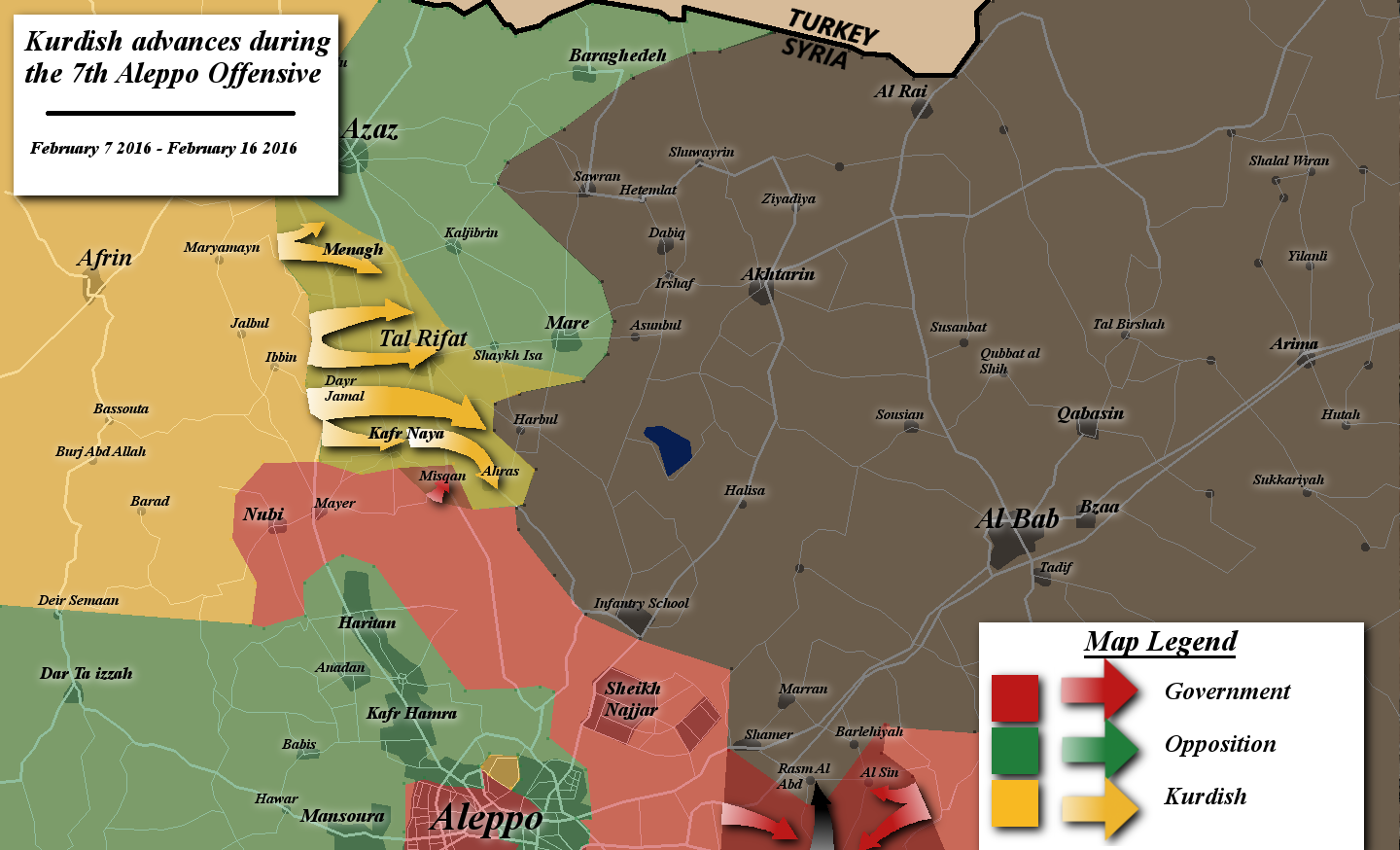
Map of the Kurdish advancements during the offensive

Late on 11 February, according to several reports, the SDF reached the western outskirts of Azaz, with clashes taking place at the national hospital and the Al Shat checkpoint, 2 kilometers from the city. However, the SDF denied they had initiated an assault on Azaz. The next morning, government troops took control of Duhrat Al-Qur'ah and Duhrat Al-Qundilah hills, near Tannurah, following their second assault on the area during the week. They then seized the Tannourah Quarries and by the evening the northern part of Tannourah itself. This advance brought the military back to Mount Simeon for the first time after three and a half years. Elsewhere, the SDF advanced near Kafr Antoan and allegedly seized the Al Shat checkpoint, near Azaz.

On 13 February, the Army fully secured Tannourah, advancing towards Anadan, while 20–46 air strikes hit Tell Rifaat. To the north, Turkish artillery shelled SDF forces at the recently captured Menagh air base and a village continuously for three hours, after the SDF came within 500 meters of Azaz. Several Twitter posts reported this was in support of a rebel counter-attack, which was eventually repelled. A Turkish official claimed the shelling was in response to YPG shelling of Turkish border military outposts, while Turkey's Prime Minister Ahmet Davutoglu demanded that the SDF withdraw from all recently captured territory. The SDF stated they would not retreat and, despite the Turkish shelling, launched a two-pronged attack on Tell Rifaat. They captured the village of Ayn Daqnah, on the road between Tell Rifaat and Azaz, and advanced to the western outskirts of Tell Rifaat.

On 14 February, the Turkish military shelled Kurdish forces for a second day, while government troops made attempts to advance from Tannurah to Anadan. During the day, 350 rebel fighters crossed into Syria from Turkey to reinforce Tell Rifaat. They entered via the Atamah military border crossing and with the approval of Turkish authorities after they had earlier crossed into Turkey from Syria's Idlib governorate. Late that evening, SDF forces entered the western and northern neighborhoods of Tell Rifaat and reached the train station where clashes took place, after which they took control of the station, leaving them in control of most of the town (70 percent) by morning. The relative ease with which the SDF broke through into Tell Rifaat was due to no rebel defense lines being built on the western side of the town. The SDF also captured Kafr Kashir, after cutting the road between it and Azaz, leaving those in Azaz in fear of an imminent SDF attack on the town. The SDF also made attempts to advance towards the Kaljibrin area, moving closer to ISIS-controlled territory.

On 15 February, government forces withdrew from Kafr Naya, handing over control of the town to the SDF. The SDF also seized Kafr Naseh and fully cleared Tell Rifaat, while south of the town, government troops captured the villages of Misqan and Ahras. At this point, the SDF were 6 kilometers from ISIL territory. The Turkish Prime Minister vowed "We will not allow Azaz to fall" and warned the SDF not to move east of Afrin or west of the Euphrates (into ISIL territory), as Turkish shelling continued for a third day, including hitting targets in Tell Rifaat. U.S. Vice President Joe Biden called on the Turkish Prime Minister to "de-escalate" and "cease artillery strikes on Kurds". The call was received with "astonishment" by Turkish officials.

On 16 February, it was reported rebel forces agreed to withdraw from Mare' (on the frontline with ISIL), thus leaving it to the SDF. However, the rebels rejected this. In addition, there was speculation the Army would hand over Ahras to the SDF so to ease tensions and avoid potential future clashes. Later that day, the SDF captured Sheikh Isa, near Mare'. Meanwhile, Turkey continued artillery strikes against the SDF.

== Aftermath – SDF advance in Aleppo city & SAA northwestern push ==
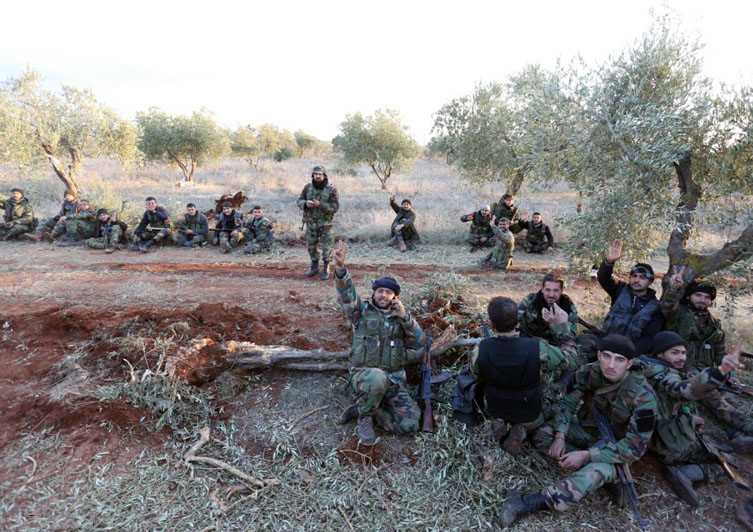
Syrian Army soldiers after breaking the siege of Nubl and Zahra Syrian Army control Opposition control (including al-Qaeda in the Levant) Kurdish control Islamic State of Iraq and the Levant Ongoing confrontation or unclear situation

During the night between 16 and 17 February, several unconfirmed reports stated the SDF had cut the Castello Road, which was the final rebel supply route into the rebel-held part of Aleppo city. The next morning, it was confirmed that the SDF had launched an attack from the northern SDF-held Sheikh Maqsood district against rebel positions: in the Bani Zaid district (to the west), in the Bustan al-Basha district (to the east), in the Ashrafiyah district (to the south) and at the Castello road (to the north). Meanwhile, the SDF's Army of Revolutionaries reported that its positions in Bustan al-Basha came under attack from the Syrian Army on one side and the Ahrar al-Sham-led Army of Aleppo on the other. During the fighting, the SDF reportedly imposed fire control over the Castillo Roundabout and seized the Hanaan Hospital in Al-Ashrafiyah. The SDF assault on the Castello Road was repelled. Later during the day, a batch of 500 al-Nusra fighters, coming from Idlib, crossed into northern Aleppo from Turkey via Azaz under the supervision of Turkish authorities. On 18 February, the SDF was reported to have captured the Youth Housing Area in Bani Zaid and the Castello Roundabout, potentially cutting the last rebel supply route into the city. However, the rebels recaptured the Youth Housing Area on the following day, or at least part of it.

Between 22 and 23 February, the SDF reportedly captured the Saladin Mosque in Bani Zaid, and the Younis al-Saba'wi School and Jama' al-Istaqmat in Al-Ashrafiyah, supported by Russian airstrikes. The SDF also advanced once again, in the Youth Housing Area. On 24 February, it was reported that SDF forces fully recaptured the Youth Housing Area.

On 26 February, Syrian government forces launched a new assault, northwest of Aleppo city, and reportedly through Kurdish-held territory, attacking Shaykh Aqil and Qabtan al-Jabal. The Syrian Army managed to capture Shaykh Aqil, but the rebels recaptured it a few hours later. The attempted advance took place hours before the implementation of a country-wide ceasefire. The same day, the Army handed over Ahras to the SDF peacefully. At the end of the month, preparations were reportedly underway for a new offensive to be launched west of Aleppo to cut the last rebel supply line into the city.

At the start of March, according to both government and rebel sources, the SDF captured a strategic hill overlooking the Castello Road. The YPG denied this.

== Iranian and Russian support ==
Iran's General Qasem Soleimani, the commander of the Quds Force, was reported to be present in the area and overseeing operations, whilst the Iranian contingent of the allied forces have reportedly played a crucial role in the victories of the Syrian army and its allies. A total of 14–24 IRGC advisors died, including Brigadier General Mohsen Ghajarian (محسن قاجاریان), commander of the 21st Imam Reza Armored Brigade of Neyshabur and an Iran–Iraq War veteran, who was advising the allied troops during the assault when he and another six Iranians were killed.

Russian air support provided to the ground forces during their onslaught in northern Aleppo was said to be one of the main reasons for the string of successes against the rebels in the offensive. During the offensive, heavy Russian air strikes destroyed all three health facilities in the town of Anadan.

== SDF role ==
The Iranian IRGC-affiliated Fars News Agency reported that the Kurdish-led People's Protection Units (YPG) were helping the Syrian Army, as the SDF of Efrîn captured the villages of Al-Ziyare and Kharebeh in the Shirava district. Fars' reports claimed that wounded Syrian government forces were sent to the Kurdish region.

== See also ==
- Battle of Aleppo (2012–2016)
- Aleppo offensive (October–December 2015)
- East Aleppo offensive (2015–16)
- 2016 Khanasir offensive
- Northern Aleppo offensive (March–April 2016)
