= Siege of Nubl and al-Zahraa =

2016 siege during the Syrian civil war

Coordinates: 36.3756°N 36.9942°E

- Part of the Syrian Civil War
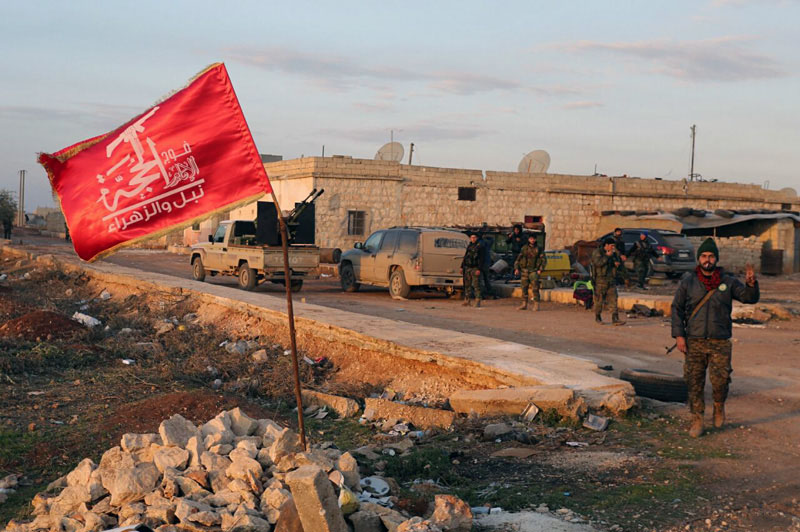
- Syrian Army soldiers after breaking the siege of Nubl and al-Zahraa, 3 February 2016. A flag of the local "Soldiers of the Mahdi" (Imam Hujja Regiment) forces is in the foreground.
Date	19 July 2012 – 3 February 2016 (3 years, 6 months, 2 weeks and 1 day)
Location	Nubl and Al-Zahraa, Aleppo Governorate, Syria
Result	Syrian government victory

Belligerents
Free Syrian Army; Islamic Front; Al-Nusra Front Islamic State of Iraq and the Levant	Ba'athist Syria; Iran; Russia (from late 2015); Allied militias: Hezbollah; Harakat Hezbollah al-Nujaba

Commanders and leaders
Abu Qudama al-Urduni †; Sheikh Mahmoud al-Khayr †; Abu ‘Isma’aeel al-Hamawi †	Mohsen Ghajarian †

Units involved
Free Syrian Army; Al-Tawhid Brigade; Conquest Brigade; Liwa Ahrar Souriya; (Kurdistan Region) Saladin Ayubi Brigade	Syrian Armed Forces; Syrian Army; National Defence Forces; Local Defence Forces; Baqir Brigade; Syrian Air Force; Iranian Armed Forces; Islamic Revolutionary Guard Corps; Islamic Republic of Iran Air Force; Russian Armed Forces; Russian Air Force; Lebanese and Syrian Hezbollah; Imam al-Mahdi Scouts; National Ideological Resistance; Quwat al-Ridha; Soldiers of the Mahdi; Imam Hujja Regiment

Strength
Unknown	3,000 NDF fighters 125 Lebanese Hezbollah fighters

Casualties and losses
Unknown	Unknown
- ~1,000 deaths total (both combatants and civilians; 50 deaths from starvation)

The Siege of Nubl and al-Zahraa during the Syrian civil war was laid by rebels to capture two Syrian government-held towns north of Aleppo, after they had seized most of the northern countryside in July 2012. The siege was lifted on 3 February 2016, as a result of a Syrian government offensive.

== Background ==
Fighting in the Aleppo Governorate began on 10 February 2012. Over the next five months, major clashes left large parts of the rural countryside under rebel control, while the provincial capital, Aleppo city, remained firmly under government control. On 19 July 2012, rebel forces stormed the city and the battle for Aleppo began, which reached a stalemate by September that dragged on over the following years, with the city divided between the two opposing forces.

== The siege ==
Map of the siege (Red: Syrian Arab Republic, Green: Syrian Opposition, Yellow: Kurdish forces)

The majority-Shia towns of Nubl and al-Zahraa, with a combined population of 35,000–60,000, were placed under siege by the Free Syrian Army (FSA) opposition group, beginning in July 2012. Movement out of Nubl was severely curtailed and residents relied on goods being airlifted by the Syrian Army. Relations between the inhabitants of Nubl and the surrounding villages were normally friendly, however during the ongoing civil war, anti-government supporters from nearby Sunni villages claimed that Nubl and al-Zahraa were hosting shabiha pro-government militias that launched attacks against opposition supporters. There were numerous tit-for-tat kidnappings between Nubl and pro-opposition villages in its vicinity. After months of rebel siege and continuous reciprocal kidnappings, popular committees in the two towns agreed to begin negotiations with the Sunni rebels on 27 March 2013. The agreement to negotiate was organised by Kurdish parties from the neighbouring Kurd Dagh region, controlled by the Kurdish-led PYD. The talks were to be brokered by the Kurds, and several kidnapped individuals had been freed on both sides. Over the following years, the only land route that brought some food and essential goods came from the then-Kurdish-held town of Afrin, to the north.

In mid-2013, 125 Hezbollah fighters were deployed via helicopters to reinforce the government defenses.

In February 2014, al-Qaeda's al-Nusra Front and other Islamist groups captured the al-Ma'amel industrial area in the south of al-Zahraa.

On 23 November 2014, al-Nusra Front, along with other Islamist factions, launched a three-front assault on the two towns and seized the industrial area southeast of al-Zahraa. They also advanced into the eastern outskirts of Nubl, which they targeted with dozens of mortar and hell-cannon shells after capturing buildings that were part of the government's first line of defense. Besides the Syrian Army and Hezbollah, the towns were also defended by their residents. By the next day, both areas were recaptured by government forces. Between eight and 43 rebels were killed during the two-day offensive.

On 8 January 2015, a new rebel offensive, led by al-Nusra Front, was launched. The first attack wave succeeded in breaking the first defensive line in both East Nubl and South Al-Zahraa, in the industrial area, and persisted overnight. The attack was repelled by National Defence Forces (NDF) and Hezbollah troops, ultimately resulting in the deaths of 14 rebels and 11 pro-government fighters. The rebels also lost four tanks, three of which were captured. Before being forced to retreat from the eastern part of Nubl, the rebels managed to capture the town's first and second roundabouts. During the fighting, a series of air raids reportedly destroyed rebel reinforcement convoys coming from al-Maayer. The next day, according to pro-government sources, a second attack was also repelled. By 14 January, the military secured Nubl and claimed that al-Nusra Front suffered 250 dead during the offensive.

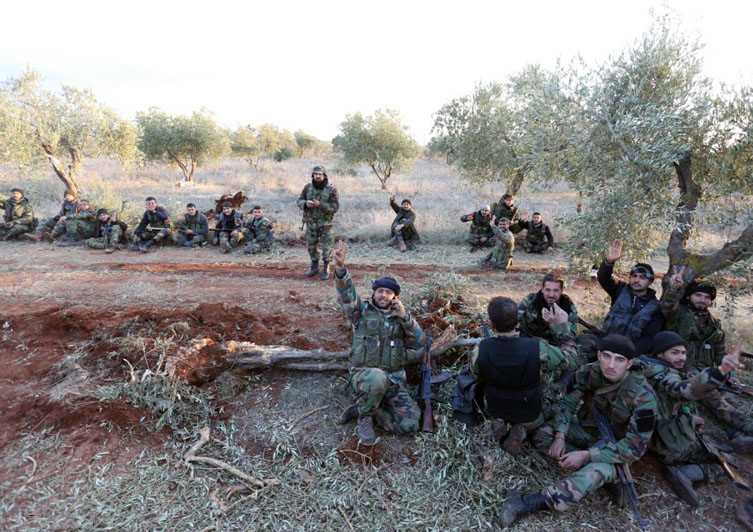
Syrian Army soldiers after the siege, 3 February 2016

In mid-February 2015, the Syrian Army and its allies launched a major offensive in the northern Aleppo countryside, with the aim of cutting the last rebel supply routes into Aleppo city and relieving the rebel siege of Nubl and Al-Zahraa. They quickly captured several villages, but bad weather conditions and an inability to call up reinforcements stalled the offensive. A few days later, the rebels launched a counter-offensive, retaking two of the four positions they had lost to government forces.

During the fighting in February 2015, 18 members of the Iraqi Shiite militant group Harakat Hezbollah al-Nujaba were reportedly killed while defending Nubl and Al-Zahraa.

On 17 April 2015, NDF and Hezbollah recaptured al-Ma'amel industrial area and by 19 April, Syrian government sources reported that 44 rebels and 12 soldiers had been killed. Beginning in October, the Iranian Air Force began to airdrop supplies for Nubl and al-Zahraa using two C-130 Hercules transports.

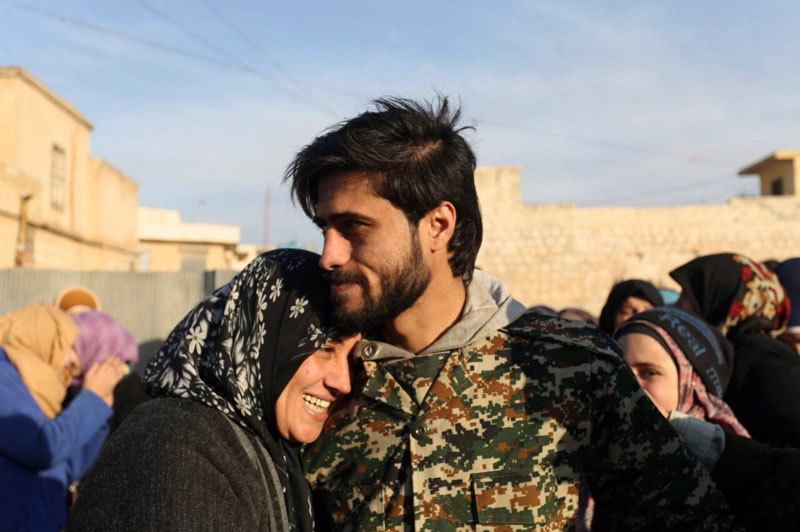
Local civilians greet Syrian Army soldiers who broke the siege, 3 February 2016

On 1 February 2016, a new offensive was launched by the military to reach Nubl and al-Zahraa and break the siege. By 2 February, they had captured three villages and part of a fourth, advancing to within three kilometers of the two besieged towns. Throughout 1 and 2 February, 320 air-raids were conducted against the rebels. At the same time, Hezbollah and pro-government fighters from Nubl and al-Zahraa launched their own assault and reportedly managed to gain some ground on the outskirts of the nearby town of Bayanoun. On 3 February, the military had finally broken the rebel siege on the two Shiite towns, after securing the village of Mu'arrassat al-Khan, where the approaching force and fighters trying to break out from the two towns linked up. The pro-opposition Syrian Observatory for Human Rights (SOHR) reported that the advance, which also cut the last northern rebel supply route from Turkey to Aleppo city, was assisted by "heavy" Russian air strikes.

An opposition politician described the government's encirclement of Aleppo as a "horrible development", while in contrast the mayor of Nubl stated the rebel siege was "cruel and caused much hardship". More than 100 rebels, 64–66 soldiers and 18–45 civilians were killed during the operation. Among the dead were 11 rebel commanders, 20 pro-government fighters from the two towns and 14 Iranian IRGC members, including Iranian 2nd Brigadier General Mohsen Ghajarian. In all, more than 500 Russian and Syrian air strikes and barrel bombs bombarded rebel positions during the intensive two-day offensive to break the siege.

== Aftermath ==
The day following the end of the siege Nubl and al-Zahraa, the Syrian government advanced east and captured the town of Mayer as well as reportedly Kafr Naya. Meanwhile, further north, the YPG seized Tell Rifaat and Menagh Air Base from the rebels.

Nubl and Al-Zahraa remained strongholds of the Assad government until late 2024, when the Syrian opposition launched major offensives. At this point, the loyalist forces had been greatly weakened due to various factors, including corruption and tensions with their foreign allies. Aleppo was overrun by rebels within days. Unlike most of Aleppo's defenders, the local militias in Nubl and Al-Zahraa initially remained at their posts, but retreated from the towns as the pro-government defenses collapsed across the north. The Syrian Democratic Forces subsequently moved into the two settlements, but were later replaced by Hay'at Tahrir al-Sham troops. The retreating loyalist militias from Nubl and Al-Zahraa continued to fight in war zones further south until the fall of the Assad regime.

== See also ==
- Battle of Aleppo (2012–2016)
- Siege
