= Conquest Brigade =

Armed Islamist insurgent group in Syria

- Arabic: لواء الفتح, romanized: Liwa al-Fath
- Logo of the militia
- Leaders: 1st Lt. Rifaat Khalil (DOW) 9 August 2012("Abu al-Nasr") Maj. Anas Ibrahim ("Abu Zeid", 2012–13); Col. Haytham Darwish † (2012–13); Muhammad Hijazi † ("Abu al-Farouq", 2012–13); Capt. Ismail Nadef ("Abu Mahmoud", c. 2012–16) Abu Yahya Qalandar (by 2018)
- Dates active: 2012 – 2025
- Headquarters: Tell Rifaat (2012–16)
- Active regions: Northern Syria: Aleppo Governorate; Raqqa Governorate (2012–13); Hasakah Governorate (2012–13)
- Ideology: Sunni Islamism: Salafi jihadism (formerly, 2013); Syrian nationalism
- Part of: (Syrian opposition) Free Syrian Army: Syrian Islamic Liberation Front (2012–13); Levant Front (from 2017); (Syrian opposition) Syrian National Army; Al-Tawhid Brigade (2013-2014); Fatah Halab (2015–16); Ahrar al-Sham (2015–16)
- Wars: the Syrian Civil War

The Conquest Brigade (Arabic: لواء الفتح, romanized: Liwa al-Fath), (Note: Alternatively transliterated as Liwa al-Fateh, Liwa al-Fatah or Liwa al-Fatih) also known as Battalion of Conquest or al-Fatah Brigade, was a Sunni Islamist Free Syrian Army group that took part in the Syrian Civil War. One of the largest rebel factions active in Aleppo Governorate during the early civil war, the militia played a major part in the fighting for Aleppo city and other battles. As result of conflicts with government forces and later the Islamic State of Iraq and the Levant it declined after 2013.The Conquest Brigade became part of the Turkish-backed Free Syrian Army (TFSA) in 2016, also engaging in fighting with the Syrian Democratic Forces.

== History ==
=== Early civil war ===
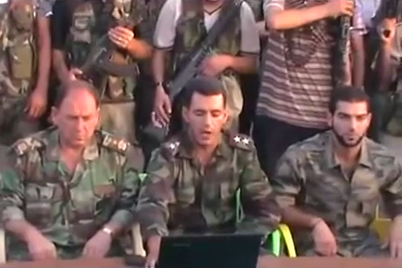
Colonel Haytham Darwish (left) and First Lieutenant Rifaat Khalil (right) announce the formation of the Conquest Brigade in Tell Rifaat, north of Aleppo, 31 July 2012.

The Conquest Brigade was founded at Tell Rifaat in late July 2012 as unification of three rebel groups that had previously operated in the countryside of northern Aleppo Governorate. Its initial member groups included 1st Lt. Rifaat Khalil's relatively powerful Muthanna ibn Haritha Battalion, the Ghuraba al-Sham (Strangers of the Levant) Battalion, and the Dir al-Wafa (Shield of Loyalty) Battalion. From its beginning, the Conquest Brigade declared its membership in the Free Syrian Army and Aleppo Military Council, and also joined the Syrian Islamic Liberation Front in September 2012.

The group was initially only active in the rural northern Aleppo Governorate, and one of its first actions was the Battle of Anadan, following which the Conquest Brigade was officially announced. Immediately after the announcement, Rifaat Khalil led the group in an attempt to storm the Air Defense Battalion 602 Base in Handarat, during which Khalil was fatally shot, dying in a hospital in Kilis on 9 August. The Conquest Brigade also helped to lay siege to the government-held towns of Nubl and al-Zahraa. It later expanded its operations, taking part in the Battle of Aleppo (2012–2016). It also fought in Raqqa Governorate and al-Hasakah Governorate; its Ghuraba al-Sham Battalion took part in the capture of Tell Abyad and its border crossing with Akçakale in September 2012. By the end of August 2012, a Conquest Brigade commander, Major Anas Ibrahim ("Abu Zeid"), claimed to have 1,300 fighters on 6 fronts in Aleppo city, who contributed to the rebel capture of more than half of the city, and 500 more around the governorate.

By late 2012 and early 2013, the Conquest Brigade was already close to various radical rebel factions, fighting and working alongside them. It cooperated with the al-Tawhid Brigade, and three Salafist / Salafi jihadist groups (al-Nusra Front, Ahrar al-Sham, and Harakat Fajr ash-Sham al-Islamiya) to establish al-Hay'a al-Sharia in Aleppo. This was a unified judicial and religious authority that was supposed to implement the Sharia in the city. Furthermore, the Conquest Brigade also grew close to the Islamic State of Iraq and the Levant (ISIL), for example cooperating with ISIL's JAMWA sub-unit during the Siege of Menagh Air Base in rural Aleppo. In contrast to its good relations with various Islamist factions, the Conquest Brigade's relationship with the Syrian opposition's leadership, including the civilian SNC and the FSA's chief commanders, was more ambivalent. The group reportedly did not "listen to the orders of the regional leaders of the FSA", though was ready to meet with SNC senior member Samir Nashar in September 2012 to discuss a stronger cooperation with other rebel factions, such as the al-Nusra Front and the al-Tawhid Brigade. The Conquest Brigade also did not support a public statement by 14 Aleppo rebel groups in November that denounced the SNC. When rebel groups in Aleppo released another, more moderate video statement that month, however, the Conquest Brigade officially supported it. A commander in the group, Captain Ismail Nadef ("Abu Mahmoud"), also said in October 2012 that several of the Conquest Brigade's subgroups included Kurds in their ranks, and the group itself had established contacts with the leftist Democratic Union Party (PYD); it nonetheless disagreed with the PYD due to its ideology and affiliation with the PKK.

The militia's Ghuraba al-Sham Battalion reportedly took part in the rebel conquest of Raqqa in March 2013, though left the Conquest Brigade some time later. In August 2013, the group was prominently involved in the final rebel assault on Menagh Air Base, and produced "slick" propaganda videos about the base's fall.

=== Conflict with ISIL and the SDF ===
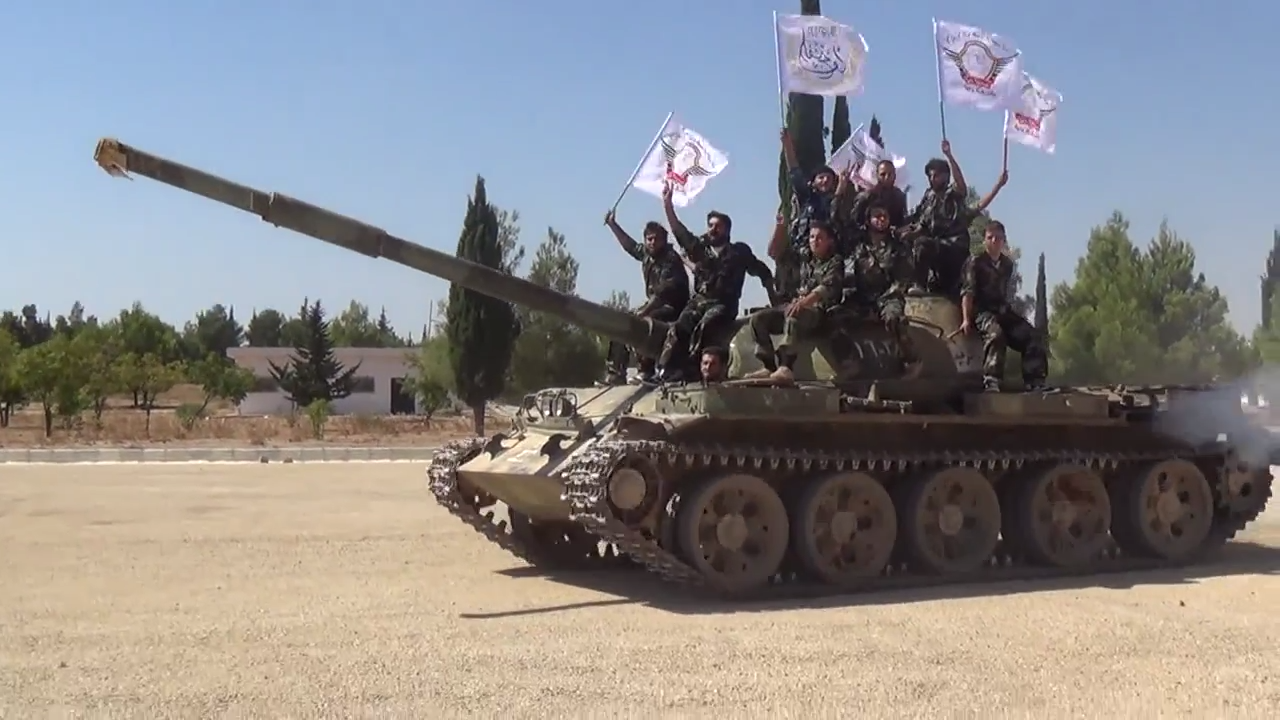
A T-62 tank jointly operated by the Conquest Brigade and the al-Tawhid Brigade in September 2013

At the beginning of September 2013, a joint operations room was formed by the Conquest Brigade, al-Tawhid Brigade, Ahrar al-Sham, al-Nusra Front, the Northern Storm Brigade, the Kurdish Islamic Front, and Turkmen groups to fight the People's Protection Units (YPG) in the Kurdish villages north of Aleppo.

Though it had enjoyed cordial relations with ISIL during the early civil war, the Conquest Brigade distanced itself from the jihadists after disagreeing with their harsh policies toward civilians in course of late 2013. The group consequently fought alongside other rebel groups against ISIL. In September 2013, it and the al-Tawhid Brigade sent some of their forces from Aleppo to al-Salameh to fortify it against an expected ISIL attack. Around this time, the Supreme Military Council's head Salim Idris brokered a merger of the Conquest Brigade and the al-Tawhid Brigade, with the two units holding a ceremony to facilitate their unification. They claimed to have a united strength of 13,000 fighters across all of Syria. On 3 February 2014, the Conquest Brigade and the al-Tawhid Brigade unsuccessfully attempted to defend al-Rai from ISIL. Later that month, the militia took part in a counter-offensive against ISIL in the northern Aleppo Governorate, fighting alongside the Kurdish Front Brigade and Descendants of Messengers Brigade to recapture some areas near Menagh. The group became part of the Fatah Halab joint operations room sometime before October 2015, and joined the Ahrar al-Sham movement in November 2015.

In February 2016, the Conquest Brigade was expelled from some of its territory in the northern Aleppo countryside, including its main bases in Tell Rifaat and Menagh Air Base, by the Syrian Democratic Forces' YPG, YPJ, and Army of Revolutionaries in the course of a Russian-backed offensive. This event caused great resentment among the Conquest Brigade, and resulted in a lasting enmity toward the SDF. The loss of its main bases might have also contributed to the group's decision to leave Ahrar al-Sham on 24 February. (Note: Despite this, the Omran Center for Strategic Studies stated in late 2018 that a group known as Conquest Brigade ("Liwa al-Fateh") was still part of Ahrar al-Sham.) In the following months, ISIL also launched an offensive against the FSA forces in the northern countryside of Aleppo. As result, elements of the Conquest Brigade were put under siege in Mare', with the SDF cutting them off from the west, while ISIL forces were located to the east. The siege was broken in June 2016, with a newly formed FSA alliance evicting ISIL from the town's outskirts. The Conquest Brigade was one of 20 rebel factions that rejected the ceasefire between government and opposition groups in September 2016, arguing that the agreement aided the government and also denouncing the exclusion of the al-Nusra Front (by then "Jabhat Fatah al-Sham") from the ceasefire.

By August 2016, the Conquest Brigade had become part of the Turkish-backed Free Syrian Army (TFSA), and aided the Turkish Armed Forces during Operation Euphrates Shield against ISIL. The militia joined the Levant Front in March 2017, while also becoming part of the Division 33, a Levant Front-affiliated unit within the TFSA's 3rd Legion. The unit then took part in the Turkish-led conquest of the DFNS' Afrin Canton from the SDF in early 2018. At the time, it was commanded by "Abu Ahmad Aleppo". After occupying Afrin city, members of the militia took part in large-scale looting of civilian properties. Thereafter, the Conquest Brigade conducted counter-insurgency operations in the Afrin area, and was reportedly targeted by YPG/YPJ guerrilla attacks.

== Ideology ==
Video of the militia's official foundation

The Conquest Brigade's stated aim has been to overthrow the al-Assad family's rule over Syria, and to establish a "Free Syrian government". The group was "religiously conservative" and follows a Sunni Islamist and Syrian nationalist ideology. By late 2012, it was not yet Salafist, but still supported a declaration in November 2012 that called for the establishment of a "state that rules according to the law of God" in Syria. By 2013, the militia was considered to be "moderate Islamist" in its views by some observers, though it already exhibited strong links to ISIL by this stage. While besieging Menagh Military Airbase in August 2013, the group's members voiced their support for ISIL's plan to exterminate all Alawites (a religious minority) in a propaganda video. The Conquest Brigade had partially adopted the ideology of the Islamic State of Iraq and the Levant by this point, though distanced itself from Salafi jihadism after its violent split with ISIL. Despite this, the group continued to be sympathetic toward radical Islamist groups, even joining the hardline Salafist Ahrar al-Sham movement for four months in 2015/16. Nonetheless, a regional expert claimed in February 2016 that the Conquest Brigade was neither Jihadist nor Salafist, and just a "nationalist group unconnected to Nusra", though also described Ahrar al-Sham (of which the militia was a part at the time) as "close battlefield ally of Nusra's".

The militia claims to respect human rights and protect civilians, but was known for violently suppressing opposing political activists.

The Conquest Brigade's views on an international intervention against the Syrian government changed over time. A commander of the Conquest Brigade stated in 2013 that his unit was not in favour of American-led invasion, though also said that the United States would find a "very powerful ally on the ground" in form of the militia in case they should enter the Syrian Civil War. By late 2016, however, the unit was considered loyal to the Turkish government and fully supported the Turkish occupation of northern Syria.

== Organization ==
=== Constituent militias ===
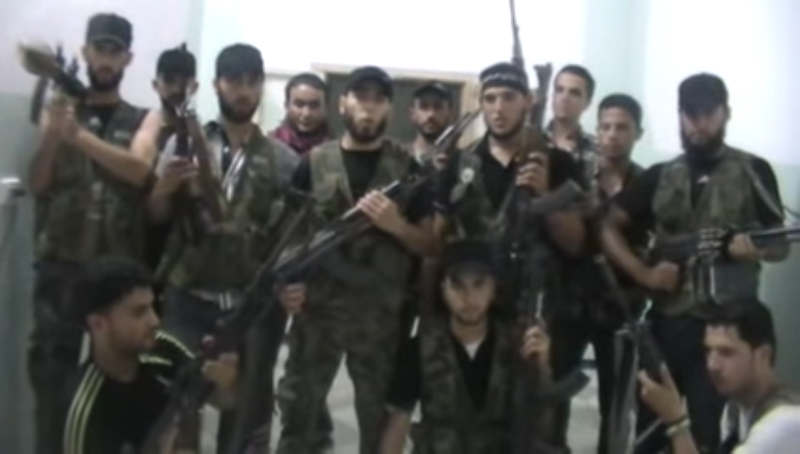
Fighters of the Ömer Seyfettin Company, one of the sub-groups of the Conquest Brigade

The Conquest Brigade was an umbrella formation for various sub-units of varying strength. By August 2012, the militia claimed to consist of 27 battalions. Of these, the following are known:

- Muthanna ibn Haritha Battalion
- Ghuraba al-Sham Battalion
- Dir al-Wafa Battalion
- Bara ibn Malik Battalion
- Turkman Bareh Battalion
- Missile and Engineering Battalion
- Arfad Martyrs' Battalion
- Ömer Seyfettin Company

=== Military strength ===
The Conquest Brigade in combat in al-Midan neighborhood of Aleppo, September 2012

Though eclipsed in its prominence and military prowess by several other rebel groups, the Conquest Brigade was a relatively powerful and influential fighting force during the early civil war. It claimed to have about 2,500 fighters in August 2012, of which 1,800 were active in Aleppo Governorate. The group was one of the largest armed opposition militias in Aleppo city at the time. At least one of its sub-groups, the Muthanna ibn Haritha Battalion, possessed tanks, technicals, and PK machine guns in 2012, while the militia as whole had anti-tank warfare capabilities and produced its own homemade rockets and improvised explosive devices. By December 2015, the Conquest Brigade had just 600 fighters left. It had increased in strength by late 2018, with about 500 fighters stationed in the Afrin area, while 300 were posted in the northern Aleppo area.

The militia received foreign aid in form of weapons and other military equipment, most prominently by Turkey and Saudi Arabia. By 2012/13, the group also had links to the United States Central Intelligence Agency (CIA). Syrian businessman Firas Tlass organized a meeting of the group's representatives with CIA agents in Gaziantep in August 2012, with the latter promising the former telecommunications equipment, and possibly weapons in case that the Conquest Brigade proved itself to be reliable. By 2018, the Afrin-based Conquest Brigade troops were supplied by Turkey, though those in the northern Aleppo countryside were not.
