= Imam Hujja Regiment =

Syrian Shia Islamist militia

Fawj al-Imam al-Hujja
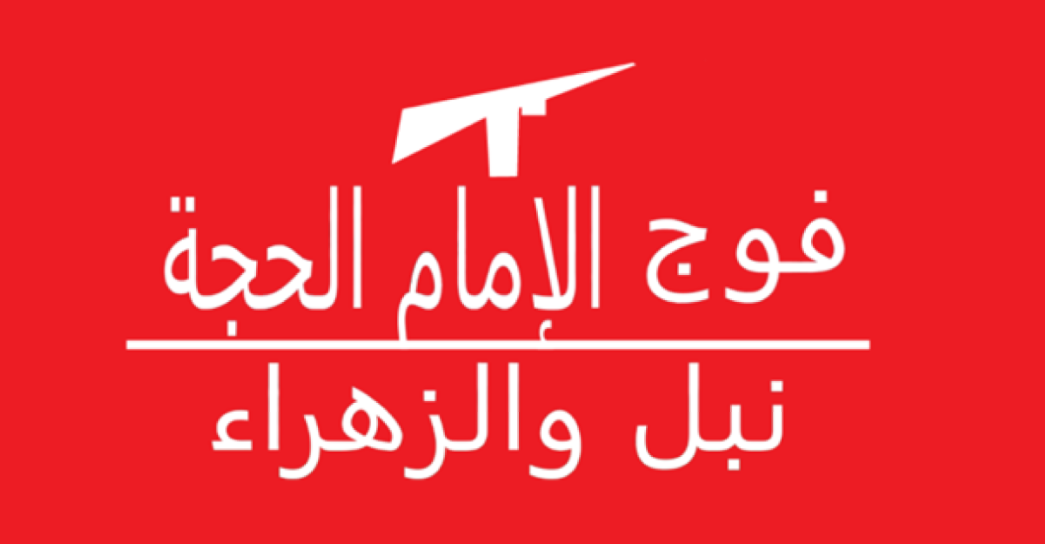
- Leader: Ali Muhammad Mustafa Khalil ('al-Zilzal') †
- Dates active: January 2016 – December 2024
- Country: Syria
- Headquarters: Aleppo; Nubl, al-Zahraa
- Ideology: Shiism
- Part of: Syrian Hezbollah
- Wars: Syrian civil war; Siege of Nubl and al-Zahraa; Battle of Aleppo (2012–2016); Aleppo offensive (June–July 2016); 2016 Aleppo summer campaign; 2024 Syrian Opposition Offensives; Battle of Aleppo (2024); Battle of Hama (2024); Battle of Homs (2024)

Fawj al-Imam al-Hujja, or the Imam Hujja Regiment, was a Shia Islamist militia formed in January 2016 during the Syrian civil war. The group ceased to exist after the Fall of the Assad regime.

== History ==
Affiliated with Hezbollah, the Imam Hujja Regiment was formed in January 2016 in Nubbul and Al-Zahraa, two towns in the Aleppo Governorate which were being besieged by rebel forces at the time.

On 9 July of 2016, declared the death of its Commander, Ali Muhammad Mustafa Khalil (known by his nickname of al-Zilzal). A detailed biography was later released, which stated that he was 34 years old and from the town of Nubl. He also had two children. He had participated in the Battle of Aleppo and eventually had received a leadership position in Fawj al-Imam al-Hujja.

The group reportedly received support from Iran.

The group ceased to exist after the Fall of the Assad regime.

== Areas of operation ==
In 2016, the militia was active in the Aleppo Governorate and took part in the siege of Nubl and al-Zahraa during the Battle of Aleppo.

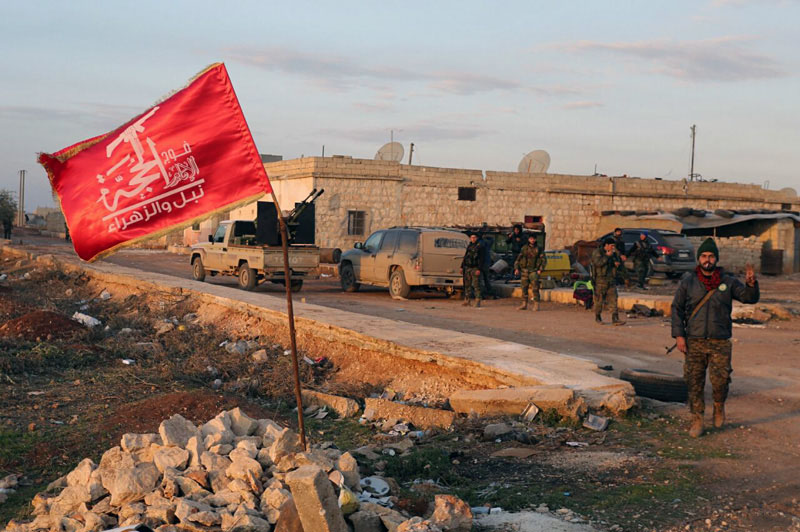
Shiite militiamen of Fawj al-Imam al-Hujja, after the Siege of Nubl and al-Zahraa, on 3 February 2016.

== 2024 Syrian opposition offensives ==
During the 2024 Syrian opposition offensives the group, and later on its remnants, unsuccessfully attempted to halt the Syrian Rebel advances during the Battle of Aleppo (2024), Battle of Hama (2024), and Battle of Homs (2024) respectively.
