= Syrian Hezbollah =

Syrian branch of Hezbollah active in the Syrian Civil War

- Leaders: Mohammad Amin Hussein al Raja; Tariq al Mayouf
- Dates active: 2012 – 2025
- Allegiance: Iran (IRGC)
- Groups: Quwat al-Ridha; Liwa al-Imam al-Mahdi (Hezbollah) Return Forces; Imam Hujja Regiment (Fawj al-Imam al-Hujja)
- Headquarters: Unknown (most likely Homs or Sayyidah Zaynab)
- Active regions: Syria
- Ideology: Shia Islamism; Jihadism (Shia); Khomeinism; Anti-Sunnism; Sectarianism
- Size: 15,000
- Part of: Hezbollah; Hezbollah involvement in the Syrian civil war; Axis of Resistance
- Wars: See battles and wars: Syrian civil war; Siege of Nubl and al-Zahraa; Battle of Aleppo (2012–2016); Al-Qusayr offensive; Battle of Zabadani (2015); Qalamoun offensive (2017); Eastern Syria campaign (September–December 2017); Northwestern Syria campaign (October 2017–February 2018); Syrian Desert campaign (December 2017–present); Southern Damascus offensive (April–May 2018); Northwestern Syria offensive (December 2019–March 2020); Fall of the Assad regime; 2024 Homs offensive; Middle Eastern crisis (2023–present); Attacks on US bases during the Gaza war

Syrian Hezbollah was the Syrian branch of the Shi'a Lebanese militia Hezbollah, which fought in the Syrian Civil War until it withdrew from Syria following the fall of the Assad regime in late 2024. There have been claims that the group's members were Syrian citizens, however available information suggests that many of its members are from Lebanon. The group was directly trained by the parent organization; Shia political party and paramilitary organization Hezbollah, the IRGC, and formerly the Syrian Arab Armed Forces. The group had fighters deployed in Damascus, Aleppo, Daraa, and Quneitra. Quwat Al-Ridha had obscure links with Syrian Hezbollah. The group also participated in the 2023 attacks on U.S. bases in Iraq and Syria. On October 30, 2023, Syrian Hezbollah militants conducted rocket attacks targeting US forces stationed at Conoco gas fields in eastern Syria.

During the 2024 Syrian opposition offensives that led to Assad’s downfall, Syrian Hezbollah along with two of its subgroups, Liwa Imam Mahdi and Quwat Al-Ridha briefly fought against rebel forces during the 2024 Homs offensive before withdrawing from Syria.

== Subgroups ==
=== Liwa Al-Imam Al-Mahdi ===
Liwa Al-Imam Al-Mahdi was a sub group of Hezbollah's Syria branch which was active until 2024. This group had at least 2 sub-groups namely the Imam Ali Battalion and the Special Operations Al-Hadi Battalion. The Al-Hadi Battalion claimed to have 2 squadrons with each respectively being led by its own commanders. The first led by “al-Saffah” and the second led by “Abu Ali Karar”.

=== Quwat Al-Ridha ===
Quwat Al-Ridha was a Hezbollah-trained and affiliated militia that was active alongside Syrian government forces in the Syrian Civil War prior to Assad's fall in December 2024. Its members belong to Syria's small Twelver Shia community, mainly from the Homs region which houses around 170,000 Shias. Its name refers to the eighth Twelver Shia Imam, Ali Al-Ridha. Quwat Al-Ridha forces had an effective presence in the operations that led to the Ba'athist capture of Homs and the Battle of Shaer gas field against the Islamic State.

=== Imam Hujja Regiment ===
Fawj Al-Imam Al-Hujja, or the Imam Hujja Regiment, was a Shia Islamist militia formed in January 2016 within the towns of Nubl and Al-Zahraa during the Syrian civil war. The militia was active in the Aleppo Governorate and took part in the Siege of Nubl and Al-Zahraa during the Battle of Aleppo.

=== Return Forces ===
Return Forces was a Hezbollah-backed Palestinian militant organization in Syria. It was created in July 2015 by Hezbollah and was led by Abu Dhikra. It was named after the Palestinian right of return and fought against Syrian opposition. The group had fought in Yarmouk and Abu Kamal.

== Syrian opposition offensives in 2024 ==
During the 2024 Homs offensive of the Syrian opposition offensives, Hezbollah had sent 2,000 fighters to Homs. Most were Quwat Al-Ridha fighters which were stationed in Al-Qusayr and the countryside of Damascus. The rest belonged to the Soldiers of Imam Al-Mahdi brigade and had withdrawn from Aleppo its nearby mostly Shia towns of Nubl and Al-Zahraa. Remnants of the Imam Hujja Regiment were also stated to be present at the battle.

As per the states of a pro-Iran Iraqi militia leader, during the Battle of Homs (2024), before the rebels had reached, Syrian soldiers in the rear lines had suddenly begun to shoot at the Hezbollah fighters in front of them, killing eight and wounding dozens. The IRGC Brigadier-General Javad Ghaffari, who was sent to Syria to be put in-charge of its last defences to stop the rebel offensive, ordered all forces affiliated with him to immediately withdraw from Homs and all of Syria.

Hezbollah fighters withdrew to Al-Qusayr, while the fighters of the local Syrian factions withdrew South of Damascus to Sayyida Zainab. Some of them later fled across the Lebanese border to Beirut.

To maintain security, the Syrian branch of the Shia Lebanese militant group, Hezbollah, guarded the Sayyida Zaynab Mosque in the town of Sayyidah Zaynab in the Rif Dimashq Governorate, south of Damascus. After the Syrian opposition offensives, Hezbollah-affiliated fighters withdrew from it after the fall of Damascus and the Assad Regime in December 2024. Many of the local Shias of area felt abandoned and expressed concerns of persecution from the new Syrian government due to their support for Iran and Iran-backed militias during the civil war.
