= Al-Shaheen Brigades =

Militant organization in Syria

- كتائب الشاهين
- Dates active: 2014/2024-2025
- Country: Syria
- Active regions: Homs; Hama
- Ideology: Anti-Assadism; Sunni Islamism
- Part of: Hay'at Tahrir al-Sham
- Wars: Syrian civil war; 2024 Syrian opposition offensives; 2024 Hama offensive; 2024 Homs offensive

Al-Shaheen Brigades (Arabic: كتائب الشاهين, lit. 'Falcon Brigade') was a militant organization during the Syrian civil war.

== History ==
It was supposedly founded in 2014, however its presentation was in 2024 Syrian opposition offensives as part of Hayat Tahrir al-Sham where it launched attacks on airports in Hama and Homs against Ba'athist Syria with Shaheen drones.

As part of Hayat Tahrir al-Sham, it was dissolved on 29 January 2025.
