= Bayanoun =

Bayanoun بيانون
- Village
- Location within Syria
- Coordinates: 36°21′09.8″N 37°3′4.6″E
- Country: Syria
- Governorate: Aleppo Governorate
- District: A'zaz District
- Nahiyah: Nubl

Population (2004 census)
  - Total: 3,824
- Time zone: UTC+2 (EET)
  - Summer (DST): UTC+3 (EEST)

Bayanoun (Arabic: بيانون) is a town in northern Syria, administratively part of the A'zaz District of Aleppo Governorate, located northwest of Aleppo. Nearby localities include Al-Zahraa and Mayer to the north and Hreitan to the south. According to the Syria Central Bureau of Statistics, Bayanoun had a population of 3,824 in the 2004 census.
