= Hama Air Base =

Hama Military Airport مطار حماة العسكري
- IATA: OS58; ICAO: none

Summary
- Airport type: Military
- Owner: Syrian Armed Forces
- Operator: Syrian Air Force
- Location: Hama, Hama Governorate
- In use: Unknown–present
- Elevation AMSL: 1,014 ft (309 m)
- Coordinates: 35.118156°N 36.711186°E

Map
- Location in Syria

Runways
Direction	Length		Surface
Direction	ft	m	Surface
00/00	9,130	2,783	Concrete
- Source: DAFIF

Hama Air Base (Arabic: مطار حماة العسكري) (IATA: OS58) is an airbase located west of Hama, Syria.

== Facilities ==
The airfield resides at an elevation of 1,014 feet (309 m) above mean sea level. It has one asphalt paved runway, which measures 2,783 by 45.5 metres (9,131 ft × 149 ft).

== During Syrian civil war ==
The airbase was used extensively by the Syrian Air Force during the Syrian civil war.

On 18 May 2018, a series of massive explosions at the airbase reportedly resulted in the death of 11 people and dozens others injured or missing. According to Syrian military officials, technical failure inside the depots had caused the incident, while other sources allege it had been triggered by an Israeli airstrike or a sabotage operation by the jihadist group Saraya Al-Jihad, who claimed responsibility soon afterwards.

On 1 March 2020, according to the Syrian Observatory for Human Rights, Turkish drones bombed the 47th brigade which was located in the airbase.

On 5 December 2024, HTS-led opposition forces took control of the base after Ba'athist Syrian forces retreated from Hama.

== See also ==
- List of Syrian Air Force bases
