= 2012 Aleppo Governorate clashes =

2012 series of battles

- Part of the early insurgency phase of the Syrian civil war
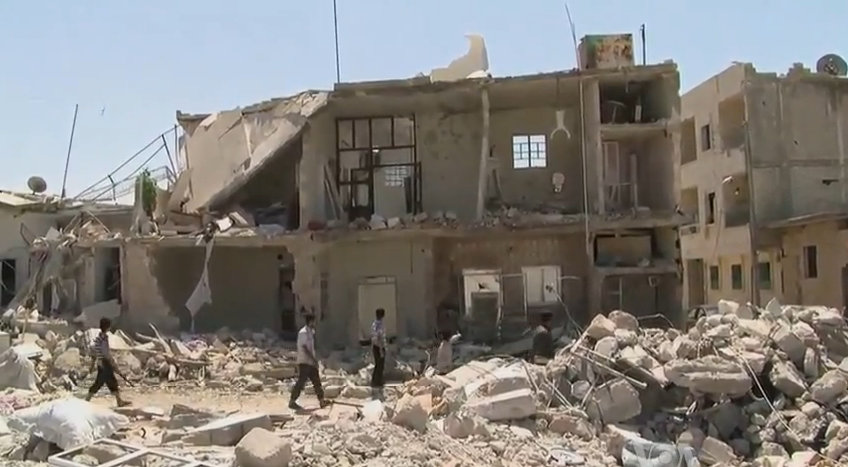
- Aftermath of aerial bombardment by the Syrian Air Force in Azaz, 18 August 2012.
Date	10 February – 19 July 2012 (5 months, 1 week and 2 days)
Location	Aleppo Governorate, Syria
Result	Rebel victory
Territorial changes	Rebels takes control of Azaz, al-Bab, Manbij, Jarabulus, Tell Rifaat, Anadan, Darat Izza, Atarib and other towns north of Aleppo city; YPG takes control of Kobanî and Afrin; Culmination in the battle of Aleppo city

Belligerents
Syrian Opposition; (Syrian opposition) Free Syrian Army; Al-Nusra Front; Kata’ib Ahrar Al-Sham; People's Protection Units	(Syria) Syrian Government

Commanders and leaders
(Syrian opposition) Col. Obaid Mohammad Obaid (Aleppo Military Council) (Syrian opposition) Maj. Mohammed Hamadeen (Free North Brigade, Aleppo Military Council) (Syrian opposition) Col. Abdul-Jabar Mohammed Egeydi (Amr ibn al-A'as Battalion) (Syrian opposition) 1st Lt. Rifaat Khalil (Muthanna ibn Haritha Battalion)	Unknown

Units involved
(Syrian opposition) Free Syrian Army; Aleppo Military Council; Free North Brigade; Darat Izza Brigade; Fursan al Jabal Brigade; Muthanna ibn Haritha Battalion; Ghuraba al-Sham Battalion; Dir al-Wafa Battalion; Amr ibn al-A'as Battalion; Halab al-Madina Brigade; Syrian Liberation Army	Syrian Armed Forces; Syrian Army; 6th Division; 12th Armoured Brigade; 11th Mechanised Brigade; 80th Army Brigade; 2nd Reserve Division; 19th Mechanised Brigade; Infantry Border Guard Brigade; 99th Army Regiment; 111th Army Regiment; 15th Division; 46th Army Regiment; Syrian Air Force; 4th Flying Training Squadron; Security Agencies; Shabiha; Berri clan militias

Strength
6,000 fighters	18,000 soldiers 300+ tanks

Casualties and losses
441 fighters killed 3 tanks lost	1,659 soldiers killed 132 armoured vehicles destroyed 1 Su-22 jet bomber shot down 1 MiG-23 jet shot down 2 L-39 jet shot down 3 Mi-17 helicopters shot down.
- at least 50 civilians killed

The 2012 Aleppo Governorate clashes were a series of battles as part of the early insurgency phase of the Syrian civil war in the Aleppo Governorate of Syria.

The clashes began following the twin bombings in Aleppo city on 10 February 2012, which were conducted by the jihadist anti-government organisation, the Al-Nusra Front. Over the next five months, major clashes left large parts of the rural countryside under rebel control, with the capital of the province, Aleppo city, still being firmly under government control. On 19 July, rebel forces stormed the city and a battle for control of Syria's largest city and economic hub had begun.

== Background ==
There were anti-government protests in Aleppo, reported since 13 April 2011. However, the city itself was mostly peaceful and spared the violence of the war, unlike the rest of the country, being a government stronghold for the better part of the first year of the conflict.

Anti-government activists called for a huge turnout on 30 June, although two small protests were held that day with only 1,000 demonstrators showing up. On 12 August, Syrian security forces fired at protesters in the Sakhur neighborhood, killing four people. On 17 August, "thousands" protested in the central square (Saadallah al-Jabiri square) of Aleppo and in other parts of the city. Opposition activists claimed that the security forces again opened fire at the protesters. On 6 September, there were reportedly huge crowds (20,000–40,000) protesting against the government after the killing of the Syrian Sunni Sheikh Ibrahim Salqini.

On 27 September, the government stormed Aleppo with tanks.

On 21 December, four protests were reportedly held at the university, where a student at the Faculty of Science was reportedly killed by government forces.

== Bombings ==
On 6 January 2012, the head of the National Organization for Human Rights in Syria warned that the government was plotting a bombing in the city, "just to terrorize the people". Ammar Qurabi told Al Arabiya that he had learned about the alleged plot from Syrian security officials. This came after bombings in Damascus in December 2011 and in January 2012. Qurabi and other opposition groups accused the government of staging those attacks to justify its crackdown on the uprising.

On 10 February, twin bomb attacks targeted the military intelligence building in Aleppo and killed 24 members of the security forces.

== Armed clashes ==
Green triangles denote key settlements taken by opposition forces. Red denotes key government controlled military bases.

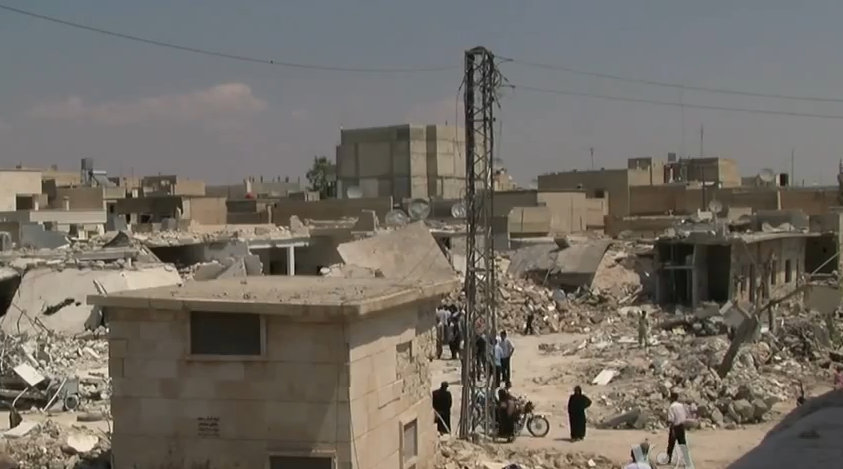
Azaz after bombardment by the Syrian Air Force, 18 August 2012.

On 14 February, five army soldiers, including two officers, were killed in fighting on the outskirts of Aleppo.

During March, the northern city of Azaz in the region of Aleppo experienced heavy fighting, with three soldiers being killed on 23 March. Activists posted a video showing what appears to be a helicopter engaged in a firefight over the town. A rebel or civilian was also reported killed during the heavy fighting in Azaz.

According to state media, two colonels were killed in Aleppo in late March.

A general of the air force intelligence was killed in Aleppo on his way to work, according to the Syrian government.

An army intelligence base and air force base were attacked in northern Aleppo province, killing three soldiers including an officer.

On 6 April, seven civilians and four soldiers were killed north of Aleppo. Two soldiers were killed on 12 April.

On 21 April, heavy clashes occurred in the early morning between opposition fighters and the Syrian army in Aleppo province. At least 14 Syrian army soldiers and one opposition officer were said to have been killed in the fighting. A Syrian army weapons cache and two cannons were said to have been destroyed by the opposition fighters, another cannon was seized from the army. They also said to have destroyed two armoured vehicles at a Syrian army checkpoint and attacked a Syrian helicopter.

On 22 April, 26 members of the pro-government militia called the shabibha, accused of the worst massacres during the conflict, were killed, and video footage showing their bodies was posted online by the rebel Free Syrian army.

On 23 April, a bomb struck a convoy carrying army officers and cadets, killing at least one officer according to state media. 42 others were also injured, some in critical condition.

On 24 April, 16 soldiers were killed in many different clashes around Aleppo. On the same day, rebels reported that they captured a military base near the rebel-controlled town of Daret Azzeh. Sixteen government soldiers reportedly died during the attack after which rebels looted large amounts of ammunition, including hundreds of artillery shells. The Army retaliated by intense strikes from military gunships on the local area. On April 28, three security force members were killed and two others injured in the Aleppo countryside.

On 29 April, it was reported that four soldiers died in a blast in a military centre in Aleppo province.

On 2 May, 15 soldiers were killed in Northern Aleppo, including two colonels. Two rebels also died in the attack near Al-Rai village, after the military forces had "scaled up military operations" there in the days since the truce took effect on April 12, said the S.O.H.R group In Syria.

On 3 May, days after four university students were killed by the pro-government military shabibha in anti-government protests. It was reported that 15,000 students protested at the university on 17 may, in the presence of U.N observers. After this incident, on 18 May 2012 the biggest anti-government demonstrations that had ever taken place in Aleppo were reported. Anti-government groups called it a real uprising in Aleppo. In two districts alone, there were reportedly over 10,000 protesters, among thousands of others in the other districts. Tear gas and live ammunition was used by security forces to disperse it. At least one protester died on 17 may, while an army officer was killed by an explosion in the city.

Eighteen soldiers were killed near Atareb town in Aleppo province, the fighting destroyed tanks and armoured personnel carriers, according to the Syrian Observatory for human rights.

Army tanks were reportedly deployed for the first time in Aleppo, where 12 massive anti-government protests were held in one day.

Two soldiers were killed and five injured after an explosion on 3 May. Also, a man identified as "the brother of a Syrian MP" was shot dead, with SOHR quoting anti-government activists as saying "the man's family is very loyal to the government and has participated in the repression of protests".

Rebel advances in July 2012

Rural Aleppo towns and the outskirts of Aleppo city were bombarded by the army in early July. The State-controlled media agency, SANA, claimed that eight rebels were killed and 6 of their armed pick up trucks destroyed by the Syrian army on July 5.

On 9 July, two soldiers were killed by an IED in Aleppo. A further four soldiers were killed when trying to enter the opposition controlled town of Azaz.

On 12 July, three soldiers were killed in Aleppo.

On 16 July, 13 soldiers, including an officer, were killed when a government checkpoint was attacked by rebel fighters, and during clashes, in the area of Tel Selour, outside Aleppo.

== Aftermath ==
Situation in the governorate in mid-August 2012

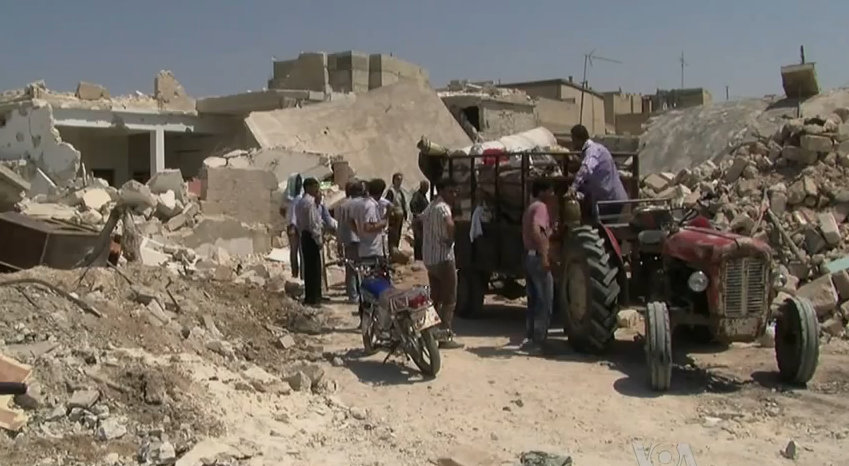
Internal displacement after aerial bombardment by the Syrian government of Azaz in Aleppo governorate, 18 August 2012.

On 19 July, the battle for Aleppo city started. Clashes began with an offensive by the Free Syrian Army against the city, primarily the Salaheddine district.

As the fighting in Aleppo city continued, near the rebel-held town of Atareb rebel fighters made a failed attack against a government-controlled police school. 12 rebels were killed, including a local brigade commander Ahmed el Faj.

On 21 July, fighting was still raging in the Salaheddine district, with the army trying to storm it with troops and armored vehicles. Meanwhile, clashes started in the poorer, tribal district of al-Sakhour. Hundreds of families were forced to flee as commercial city has been slowly turned into a war zone.

On 23 July, it was confirmed that the FSA had finally taken control of Azaz. They said that 17 government tanks had been destroyed and one captured, a journalist in the area counted 7 destroyed tanks.

In the Aleppo countryside, the FSA rapidly gained ground in late July and captured members of the military intelligence. Footage showed rebels riding around the town of Al-Bab in a tank and howitzer artillery that they had captured from an army base. Captured soldiers said that 30 soldiers had been killed in Al-Bab in the past week and it was later reported that the last army base in the Aleppo countryside, on the outskirts of Al-Bab, was taken by the opposition.

On 15 August, Syrian fighter jets conducted two devastating bombing runs on the rebel-held town of Azaz, flattening a string of houses and killing at least 20 people including children with a little girl who had been killed in the strike being brought to the hospital and at least 10 houses were flattened in the bombardment. "This was a civilian area. All these houses were packed with women and children sleeping during the fast," said witness Abu Omar, a civil engineer in his 50s, referring to the dawn-to-dusk fast Muslims observe during Ramadan. Witnesses and FSA forces who reinforced security around the town after the strike said the jet fired twice, targeting a makeshift media centre used by foreign reporters in the second, smaller strike. Dozens of people, many wailing and shouting, were climbing over the rubble, trying to pull out victims. Witnesses said the bomb must have weighed at least half a tonne and the impact shattered windows up to four blocks away. Residents insisted there was no rebel base where the bomb struck, but some said the families of FSA fighters lived there. "It was a massacre, an entire family like mine was exterminated," said one woman who refused to give her name. Four Lebanese hostages were reportedly killed. Another report put the death toll at 31 people.

== Bibliography ==
- Bolling, Jeffrey (29 August 2012). Rebel Groups in Northern Aleppo Province (PDF). Washington, D.C.: Institute for the Study of War.
