= Al-Jalamah, Syria =

Al-Jalamah الجلمة
- Village
- Location in Syria
- Coordinates: 35°19′19″N 36°29′17″E
- Country: Syria
- Governorate: Hama
- District: Mahardah
- Subdistrict: Karnaz

Population (2004)
  - Total: 3,970
- Time zone: UTC+3 (AST)
- City Qrya Pcode: C3468

Al-Jalamah (Arabic: الجلمة) is a Syrian village located in the Karnaz Subdistrict of the Mahardah District in Hama Governorate. According to the Syria Central Bureau of Statistics (CBS), al-Jalamah had a population of 3,970 in the 2004 census.
