= Quwat al-Ridha =

Former Shia militia in the Syrian civil war

Quwat al-Ridha قوات الرضا
- Founder: Hezbollah
- Leader: Hamza al-Heydar ('Hajj Abu Mustafa') †
- Dates active: 2013 – 2024
- Headquarters: Homs
- Active regions: Homs Governorate; Rif Dimashq Governorate; Aleppo Governorate; Daraa Governorate
- Ideology: Shia Islamism; Khomeinism
- Size: 20,000 estimated (August 2015); 3,000–3,500 (Council on Foreign Relations claim, 2024)
- Part of: Syrian Hezbollah
- Wars: Syrian Civil War; Siege of Homs (2011–2014); Rif Dimashq offensive (September–November 2013); Daraa offensive (February–May 2014); Daraa offensive (February–June 2017); 2018 Southern Syria offensive (allegedly); Battle of Aleppo (2012–2016); Aleppo offensive (October–December 2013); Siege of Nubl and Al-Zahraa; Battle of the Shaer gas field (October–November 2014); Battle of Qalamoun (2013–2014); Qalamoun offensive (2014); Qalamoun offensive (May–June 2015); Qalamoun offensive (2017); Siege of Eastern Ghouta; Palmyra offensive (July–August 2015); Battle of Homs (2024) (surrendered)

The Al-Ridha Forces (Arabic: قوات الرضا, romanized: Quwwat ar-Riḍā) was a Hezbollah-trained and affiliated militia that was active alongside Syrian government forces in the Syrian Civil War prior to Assad's fall in December 2024. Its members belong to Syria's small Twelver Shia community, mainly from the Homs region which houses around 170,000 Shiites. Its name refers to the eighth Twelver Shia Imam, Ali al-Ridha. Quwat al-Ridha forces had an effective presence in the operations that led to the Ba'athist capture of Homs and the Battle of Shaer gas field against the Islamic State.

== Military role ==
Quwat al-Ridha had participated in many battles alongside pro-Assad forces and pro-Iran militias, including the Siege of Homs, the Rif Dimashq offensive (March–August 2013), Battle of Aleppo (2012–2016), Battle of the Shaer gas field (October–November 2014), and the Palmyra offensive (July–August 2015). It also made a last-ditch effort at the Battle of Homs (2024)

== Organization ==
Quwwat al-Ridha's top leadership was typically from Shia-majority areas of Lebanon, mostly from Southern Lebanon, Beqaa Valley, and Shia suburbs of Beirut such as Dahieh and Bourj el-Barajneh.

According to a 2015 report by the U.S. News & World Report, Quwat al-Ridha was considered the core of Syrian Hezbollah. It mainly recruited members from the Shia community of Syria's Homs Governorate, which housed half of Syria's Shia population. The report also claimed that the Al-Ridha forces numbered up to 20,000 fighters at the time.

In 2024, the pro-Israel Council on Foreign Relations claimed that the Ridha forces had downsized and were by then just 3,000–3,500 fighters.
