= ARA News =

Arabic online news service

ARA News (Arabic: آرانيوز)
- Website type: News
- Available in: Arabic, English
- Area served: Syria, Turkey, Iraq
- Owner: unknown
- Creator: unknown
- Editors: Adib Abdulmajid, Zachary Singer, Abdulilah Ibrahim (Egid)
- Website: aranews.org aranews.net
- Advertising: No
- Commercial: unknown
- Registration: None
- Launched: May 2013; 13 years ago
- Current status: Inactive

ARA News (Arabic: آرانيوز, romanized: ʾĀrā Niyūz) was an online news service focused on the consequences of war in Syria and Iraq. Although described as a Kurdish news agency by its director, the site started as an Arabic-only news service and as of January 2016, still published only in the Arabic and English languages, and ceased publishing around August 2017.

ARA News was referenced hundreds of times by other news vendors, and thousands of times in social media. ARA News was supported by Free Press Unlimited, a media development organisation based in Amsterdam, the Netherlands.

== Ownership, identity and reliability ==
ARA News is a member of the Ethical Charter for Syrian Media.

The ownership of the ARA News is unpublished. The founder and chief editor is Adib Abdulmajid, a Syrian Kurd who fled Syria after taking part in pro-democracy activities, and sought asylum in the Netherlands. Reporters and editors of ARA News are named. Most of the staff are Kurdish, some are Arabs.

ARA News was supported by Free Press Limited, whose mission statement is that "People deserve to know." Free Press Unlimited claims to work to ensure that impartial news and information are and remain available to people across the globe, particularly in countries where there is little to no press freedom. Free Press Unlimited has media projects in approximately 40 countries around the world.

== Name ==
ARA is an abbreviation of the Kurdish Ajansa Rojnamevaniya Azad, meaning "Independent Press Agency". The Arabic name (Arabic: آرانيوز) is a simple transliteration of ARA News.

== History ==
ARA News was founded by Adib Abdulmajid in 2013, the website's domain name having been registered in April 2013, and the first news reports were published in June 2013. Abdulmajid, a graduate of Damascus and Tilburg universities, believed that in Syria and its region "freedom of expression has been suppressed for decades", and he created ARA News as "a step forward towards free media" in the region.

With the aim of developing professional journalism in Syria, in 2014 Free Press Unlimited gave training to editors, news managers and reporters from ARA News.

In 2015 ARA News became one of the first 20 signatories of the Ethical Charter for Syrian Media, "an alliance of significant independent Syrian media organisations committed to the highest standards of journalism and unimpeded freedom of speech" established under Swedish International Development Cooperation Agency sponsorship.

The last online publication of ARA News was issued online in late August 2017.
