= Menagh Air Base =

Airbase in Syria

Menagh Air Base قاعدة مطار منغ

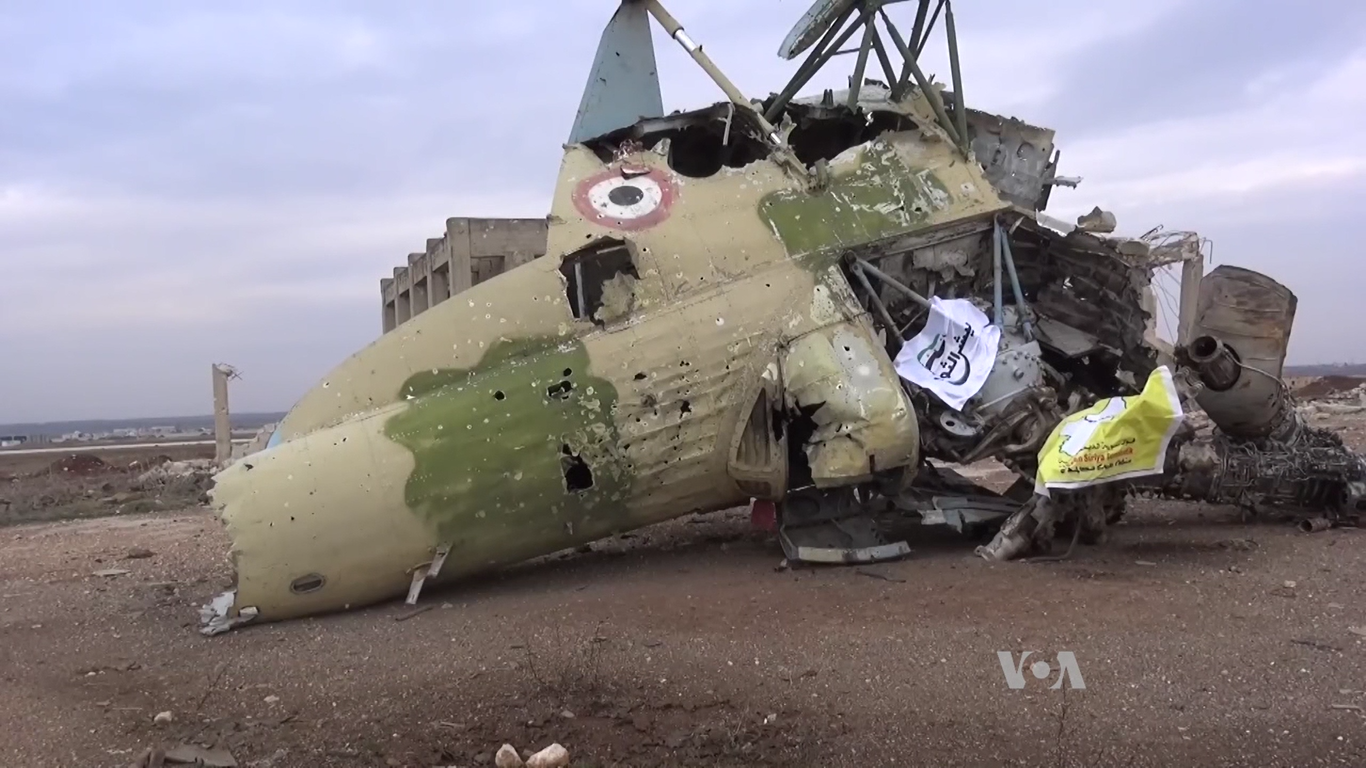
- Flags of the Army of Revolutionaries and the Syrian Democratic Forces hang on the wreckage of a Syrian Air Force aircraft in Menagh Airbase.
- IATA: none; ICAO: OS71

Summary
- Airport type: Military
- Owner: (Syria) Syrian Armed Forces
- Operator: Syrian Air Force; (Turkey) Turkish Air Force
- Location: Menagh, Aleppo Governorate
- In use: Unknown–present
- Coordinates: 36°31′19″N 37°2′28″E

Map
- Location in Syria

Runways
Direction	Length		Surface
Direction	ft	m	Surface
00/00	4,700 (est.)	1,430 (est.)	Concrete

Menagh Air Base (Arabic: قَاعِدَة مَطَار مِنِّغ, romanized: Qāʿidat Maṭār Minniḡ), also known as Minnigh airport or Minakh Air Base, is a Syrian Air Force installation located 6 kilometres (3.7 mi) south of Azaz, Aleppo Governorate, Syria near the village of Manaq.

Menagh Air Base was home to the 4th Flying Training Squadron, equipped with MBB 223 Flamingo trainer aircraft and Mil Mi-8 helicopters.

== Syrian Civil War ==
The air base became a major target of the armed opposition in the Syrian Civil War's Battle of Aleppo. The air base was under siege by opposition forces from August 2012 until it fell to the rebels and Islamists (including ISIL, the Northern Storm Brigade and Tawhid Brigades) on 6 August 2013. It subsequently fell under control of the Al Nusra Front. On 10 February 2016, the Syrian Democratic Forces from nearby Afrin captured the airbase, aided by Russian airstrikes. After the Kurdish YPG captured the Menagh Air Base, the organization renamed it "Serok Apo Air Base", meaning "Leader Apo", in reference to Abdullah Öcalan, the imprisoned leader of the PKK.

On 1 December 2024, the Syrian Interim Government-led opposition armed groups under the Dawn of Freedom Operations Room announced that they had taken control of the air base.

== See also ==
- List of Syrian Air Force bases
