= Liwa al-Imam al-Mahdi =

Former subgroup of Hezbollah's Syria branch

- Founder: Al-Hajj Waleed
- Leaders: Al-Hajj Waleed; Abu Al-Hadi (Rani Jaber); Al-Saffah; Abu Ali Karrar
- Dates active: 2014-2024
- Dissolved: 2024
- Country: Ba'athist Syria
- Allegiance: Iran (IRGC)
- Headquarters: Homs
- Part of: Syrian Hezbollah
- Wars: Syrian Civil War

The Imam Mahdi Brigade (Arabic: لواء الإمام المهدي, romanized: Liwa al-Imam al-Mahdi), named after the twelfth and final Shia Imam, Mahdi, was a sub group of Hezbollah's Syria branch. It was active until 2024.

== Subgroups ==
This group had at least 2 sub-groups namely the Imam Ali Battalion and the Special Operations al-Hadi Battalion. The al-Hadi Battalion claimed to have 2 squadrons with each respectively being led by its own commanders. The first led by “al-Saffah” and the second led by “Abu Ali Karar”.

== Leaders ==
Abu Hadi, was the leader of the al-Hadi Battalion. His real name was Rani Jaber and he was a Syrian from Deraa.

The leader of this group al-Hajj Waleed was a Lebanese national. he was from Ba’albek in the Beqaa Valley in Lebanon.

According to him Liwa al-Imam al-Mahdi was set up in 2014 by Hezbollah and had Shia recruits from all over Syria. He also said that the group had participated in many battles, including battles in Deraa, Quneitra, Ghouta, Aleppo and the Ithiriya-Raqqa route.

== Losses ==
Al-Hajj Waleed gave his toll of killed at 25 and wounded at 55.
