= Mayer, Syria =

Mayer ماير
- Village
- Location within Syria
- Coordinates: 36°23′11″N 37°01′31″E
- Country: Syria
- Governorate: Aleppo Governorate
- District: A'zaz District
- Nahiyah: Nubl

Population (2004 census)
  - Total: 4,772
- Time zone: UTC+2 (EET)
  - Summer (DST): UTC+3 (EEST)

Mayer (Arabic: ماير) is a town in northern Syria, administratively part of the A'zaz District of Aleppo Governorate, located northwest of Aleppo. Nearby localities include Kafr Naya to the northeast and Nubl to the west. According to the Syria Central Bureau of Statistics, Mayer had a population of 4,772 in the 2004 census.
