= Al-Zahraa =

Al-Zahraa الزهراء
- Town
- Location within Syria
- Coordinates: 36°21′30.9″N 37°00′38.4″E
- Country: Syria
- Governorate: Aleppo Governorate
- District: A'zaz District
- Nahiyah: Nubl

Population (2004 census)
  - Total: 13,780
- Time zone: UTC+2 (EET)
  - Summer (DST): UTC+3 (EEST)

Al-Zahraa (Arabic: الزهراء, romanized: az-Zahrāʾ) is a town in northern Syria, administratively part of the A'zaz District of Aleppo Governorate, located northwest of Aleppo. Nearby localities include Tell Rifaat and Mayer to the northeast and Anadan to the south. According to the Syria Central Bureau of Statistics, al-Zahraa had a population of 13,780 in the 2004 census. Al-Zahraa has a predominantly Shia Muslim population and, along with nearby Nubl, forms a small Shia-inhabited pocket in a mostly Sunni Muslim area in the Aleppo Governorate.

== Syrian Civil War ==
Nubl and al-Zahraa were under siege by the anti-government Free Syrian Army (FSA), al-Nusra Front (al-Qaeda's Syrian branch), and Ahrar al-Sham. Movement out of Nubl was severely curtailed, and it relied on goods being airlifted by the Syrian Army. Although relations between the inhabitants of Nubl and the surrounding villages were normally friendly, during the ongoing Syrian civil war, anti-government supporters from nearby Sunni villages have claimed that Nubl and al-Zahraa hosted pro-government militias that have launched attacks against opposition supporters. There were numerous tit-for-tat kidnappings between Nubl and pro-opposition villages in the vicinity. After months of rebel siege and continuous reciprocal kidnappings, popular committees in the two towns agreed to begin negotiations with Sunni rebels on 27 March 2013. The agreement to negotiate was organised by Kurdish parties from the neighboring Kurd Dagh region, which is controlled by Kurdish fighters of the PYD. The talks were brokered by Kurds, and several kidnapped individuals were freed on both sides.

On 3 February 2016, an offensive by the Syrian Arab Army and Hezbollah ended the siege.

The town came briefly under the control of the Kurdish-led SDF after the withdrawal of pro-Assad forces on November 30, 2024, to evacuate Kurdish IDPs from the Shahba Canton. Afterwards, militants of Hayat Tahrir al-Sham took over.

Following the capture of Aleppo by HTS, the village requested protection from HTS against sectarian violence. The village has been under HTS and then Syrian Army protection since then.

== See also ==
- Nubl
