= Nubl =

Nubl نبل
- Town
- Location within Syria
- Coordinates: 36°22′32″N 36°59′39″E
- Country: Syria
- Governorate: Aleppo
- District: A'zaz
- Subdistrict: Nubl
- Elevation: 429 m (1,407 ft)

Population (2004 census)
  - Total: 21,039
- Time zone: UTC+2 (EET)
  - Summer (DST): UTC+3 (EEST)

Nubl (Arabic: نبل, also spelled Nubbul or Nubbol) is a small city in northern Syria, administratively part of the Aleppo Governorate, located northwest of Aleppo. Nearby localities include al-Zahraa immediately to the south, Anadan to the southeast, Tel Rifaat to the northeast, Aqiba to the north, Barad to the west, and Mayer immediately to the east. According to the Syria Central Bureau of Statistics (CBS), Nubl had a population of 21,039 in the 2004 census. Its inhabitants are predominantly Shia Muslims and together with nearby al-Zahraa, Nubl forms a small Shia-inhabited pocket in a mostly Sunni Muslim area in the Aleppo Governorate.

Nubl is the administrative center of Nahiya Nubl of the Azaz District.

== Syrian Civil War ==
Nubl and al-Zahraa were under siege by the anti-government Free Syrian Army (FSA), al-Nusra Front (al-Qaeda's Syrian branch), and Ahrar al-Sham. Movement out of Nubl was severely curtailed, and it relied on goods being airlifted by the Syrian Army. Although relations between the inhabitants of Nubl and the surrounding villages were normally friendly, during the ongoing Syrian civil war, anti-government supporters from nearby Sunni villages have claimed that Nubl and al-Zahraa hosted pro-government militias that have launched attacks against opposition supporters. There were numerous tit-for-tat kidnappings between Nubl and pro-opposition villages in the vicinity. After months of rebel siege and continuous reciprocal kidnappings, popular committees in the two towns agreed to begin negotiations with Sunni rebels on 27 March 2013. The agreement to negotiate was organised by Kurdish parties from the neighboring Kurd Dagh region, which is controlled by Kurdish fighters of the PYD. The talks were brokered by Kurds, and several kidnapped individuals were freed on both sides.

On 3 February 2016, an offensive by the Syrian Arab Army and Hezbollah ended the siege.

On 30 November 2024, the Kurdish-led Syrian Democratic Forces (SDF) took control of the city amidst the attack on Aleppo and the subsequent retreat of pro-government forces, to evacuate Kurdish civilians and IDPs from the Shahba Canton. Afterwards, militants affiliated with Hayat Tahrir al-Sham took over the city.

Following the capture of Aleppo by HTS, the village requested protection from HTS against sectarian violence. The village has been under HTS and then Syrian Army protection since then.

== See also ==
- Al-Zahraa
- Syrian Civil War
