= Northwestern Syria offensive (2024) =

2024 offensive in Syria

- Part of the 2024 Syrian opposition offensives during the Syrian civil war
- Situation after fall of Hama Controlled by Ba'athist Syria Controlled by the Syrian opposition Controlled by the Syrian Democratic Forces
Date	27 November – 5 December 2024 (1 week and 1 day)
Location	Northwestern Syria
Result	Syrian opposition victory: Rebels capture Aleppo and Hama; Beginning of the wider 2024 Syrian opposition offensives
Territorial changes	Syrian opposition groups take control of Northwestern Syria

Belligerents
Syrian Opposition: Syrian Salvation Government; (Syrian opposition) Syrian Interim Government; Jaysh al-Izza; (Syrian opposition) Suqour al-Sham Brigades; Ansar al-Tawhid; Turkistan Islamic Party in Syria; Imam Bukhari Jamaat; Ajnad al-Kavkaz; Jama'at Ansar al-Islam; Supported by: Turkey (denied by Turkey); Ukraine (denied by Ukraine)	Ba'athist Syria; Iran; Russia; Hezbollah; Popular Mobilization Forces; (Palestine) Palestinian militias	Autonomous Administration of North and East Syria; CJTF–OIR; United States; (Note: Armament support only.)

Commanders and leaders
Ahmed al-Sharaa; Murhaf Abu Qasra	Bashar al-Assad; Abdul Karim Mahmoud Ibrahim; Suhayl al-Hasan; (Iran) Kioumars Pourhashemi †	Mazloum Abdi

Units involved
(Syrian opposition) Military Operations Command; Hay'at Tahrir al-Sham; Red Bands; Thermal Brigades; Liwa al-Muhajireen wal-Ansar; Katibat al-Tawhid wal-Jihad; Mujahidin Ghuroba Division; National Front for Liberation; Sham Legion; Ahrar al-Sham; Jaysh al-Ahrar; (Syrian opposition) Jaysh al-Nasr; Damascus Gathering; (Syrian opposition) Central Division; (Syrian opposition) 60th Infantry Division; Jaysh al-Izza; (Syrian opposition) Suqour al-Sham Brigades; Ansar al-Tawhid; (Syrian opposition) Syrian National Army; Nour al-Din al-Zenki Movement; (Syrian opposition) Levant Front; Sultan Suleiman Shah Division; Sultan Murad Division; (Syrian opposition) Hamza Division	Syrian Armed Forces; Syrian Army; Syrian Air Force; National Defense Forces; Russian Armed Forces; Russian Air Force; Spetsnaz GRU; Islamic Revolutionary Guard Corps; Quds Force; (Hezbollah) Radwan Force	Syrian Democratic Forces; People's Defense Units; Women's Protection Units; Al-Bab Military Council; Manbij Military Council; Tabqa Military Council; Ashrafieh Liberation Forces; Sheikh Maqsoud Liberation Forces

Strength
15,000 (est. 2022); (Syrian opposition) 80,000 (est. 2025)	170,000 (2023); 50,000 (2023); At least 300 (2024)	100,000 (2021)

Casualties and losses
311 killed; (Syrian opposition) 60 killed; c. 1,000 killed (Assad government claim)	(Ba'athist Syria) 220 killed, 21 captured 25 pro-Iranian militiamen killed (Iran) 15 IRGC killed (Russia) 1+ killed	3 killed and several captured
- 111 civilians killed (Note: 95 killed by Russian and SAA air and artillery strikes and 13 killed by HTS shelling.); 370,000 civilians displaced

On 27 November 2024, a coalition of Syrian opposition groups called the Military Operations Command, led by Hay'at Tahrir al-Sham (HTS) and supported by allied Turkish-backed groups in the Syrian National Army (SNA), launched an offensive against the Ba'athist regime's armed forces in Aleppo and Hama Governorates in Syria. Codenamed Deterrence of Aggression (Note: Arabic: ردع العدوان, romanized: Rade Aleudwan) by HTS, this was the first military offensive campaign launched by opposition forces in the Syrian civil war since the March 2020 Idlib ceasefire. On 29 November 2024, HTS entered Aleppo and captured most of the city, as the Syrian Arab Army (SAA) collapsed. The next day, opposition forces made rapid advances, capturing dozens of towns and villages as government forces disintegrated, and advanced toward Hama, subsequently capturing it on 5 December. This offensive begun a series of offensives that led to fall of Damascus.

== Background ==
Since the March 2020 Idlib ceasefire agreement, large scale operations ceased between opposition and pro-government forces in Northwestern Syria. However, revolutionary groups based in northwestern Syria prepared for a resumption of hostilities, with HTS in particular strengthening its military capabilities by reforming its structures into a "conventional armed force", improving training, and setting up special forces specializing in raids and night-time operations. According to the Kyiv Post, some Islamist social media accounts said that the Idlib-based rebels received some training and other support by Ukraine's Main Directorate of Intelligence. Meanwhile, the Syrian government suffered from growing corruption, with researcher Charles Lister describing it as the "world's biggest narco state" whose "corrupt business elite and a powerful network of military commanders, militia leaders and warlords" were held together by drug trade revenue, especially trade of Captagon. Starting in late 2022, HTS forces launched a series of infiltration and sniper attacks on government forces, leading up to the offensive. In retaliation, there was shelling of Idlib Governorate as well as Russian air strikes. Aleppo had been controlled by Bashar al-Assad's government and Iranian-backed militias since the Aleppo offensive in 2016.

According to Abu Hassan al-Hamwi, head of HTS's military wing, the offensive had been planned for a year prior to its launch. Beginning in 2019, HTS developed a military doctrine aimed at transforming loosely organized opposition and jihadist fighters into a conventional military force. The group established specialized military branches, most notably a drone unit that produced reconnaissance, attack, and suicide drones. HTS additionally established coordination with southern Syrian rebels, creating a unified command structure that incorporated leaders from approximately 25 rebel groups, with the strategic objective of encircling Damascus from multiple directions. HTS initiated the offensive partly to disrupt regional powers' diplomatic normalization with the Assad regime and to counter escalating aerial attacks on northwestern Syria. The group determined that Assad's international allies were strategically constrained, with Russia committed to its war in Ukraine and both Iran and Hezbollah engaged in conflict with Israel, presenting a favorable tactical opportunity.

In October 2024, a large mobilization by HTS and government forces was initiated in the Aleppo countryside, as the Syrian rebels reported that they had been preparing for months for a large-scale offensive against government forces within the city of Aleppo. On 26 November 2024, government forces artillery struck the opposition held town of Ariha, killing and injuring 16 civilians, mostly children.

== Offensive ==
=== Beginning of the offensive ===
Situation in northwestern Syria on 28 November

On 27 November 2024, HTS announced that it had launched an offensive dubbed "Deterrence of Aggression" toward pro-government forces in western Aleppo Governorate. The offensive was stated to be a response to recent artillery shelling by the Assad government against rebel-held Ariha.

During the first ten hours of the offensive, HTS captured 20 towns and villages from pro-government forces, including the towns of Urm al-Kubra, Anjara, Urum al-Sughra, Sheikh Aqil, Bara, Ajil, Awijil, al-Hawtah, Tal al-Dabaa, Hayr Darkal, Qubtan al-Jabal, al-Saloum, al-Qasimiyah, Kafr Basin, Hawr, Anaz and Basratoun. In addition, the 46th regiment base of government forces was besieged by the HTS and captured a few hours later. The Syrian Observatory for Human Rights reported that 37 Syrian government soldiers and allied militias and 60 fighters from the opposition forces were killed in the clashes. A Russian special forces unit was ambushed by rebels, who later posted photos of a dead Russian soldier and captured equipment. In response, Syrian and Russian forces launched aerial assaults on areas controlled by revolutionary groups. Russian fighters also conducted airstrikes around Atarib, Darat Izza, and surrounding villages, while government forces shelled rebel-controlled Idlib, Ariha, Sarmada and other areas in southern Idlib Governorate.

On 28 November, HTS launched an offensive on the eastern Idlib countryside, capturing the villages of Dadikh, Kafr Batikh and Sheikh Ali as well as a neighborhood in the city of Saraqib. This advance brought them within two kilometers of the M5 highway, a strategic route that had been secured by pro-government forces in 2020. HTS also attacked al-Nayrab's airport located east of Aleppo, where Iranian-backed militants have a presence. In the latter half of the day, HTS captured the villages of Kafr Basin, Arnaz and Al-Zarba in the western Aleppo countryside, and cut off the M5 highway. The Syrian rebels had captured around 40 towns and villages in total by the end of the day.

A Russian airstrike killed fifteen civilians in Atarib in the western Aleppo countryside. Four others were killed in either a Syrian or Russian airstrike in Darat Izza. Iranian state media reported that Islamic Revolutionary Guard Corps (IRGC) Brigadier General Kioumars Pourhashemi, who served as a senior military advisor in Syria, was killed by rebels in Aleppo. An SDF fighter was killed by Turkish drone strike in the north of Raqqah Governorate.

On 29 November, HTS captured the villages of Tal Karatabeen, Abu Qansa, and Al-Talhiya in Idlib countryside and Al-Mansoura, Jab Kas, and Al-Bawabiya in Aleppo countryside. Strong fighting around the town of Saraqib continued. By this point, other Idlib-based Islamist groups were backing the HTS advance, including Ajnad al-Kavkaz, and Liwa al-Muhajireen wal-Ansar. Four civilians were killed and two others were injured by HTS shelling in the al-Hamdaniya neighborhood of Aleppo city. An attack by the SDF was carried near Al-Bab with 15 SNA fighters dying. Seven SNA fighters were killed in a Russian airstrike on a SNA military headquarters in Mare'. Four civilians were also killed in separate Russian airstrikes in Idlib.

=== Battle of Aleppo ===
On 29 November, opposition forces launched a large-scale offensive in Aleppo Governorate aimed at capturing the city of Aleppo and surrounding areas. The rapid fall of Aleppo, which had taken the regime four years to capture from rebels in 2016, surprised even HTS leadership. Al-Hamwi later stated "We had a conviction, supported by historical precedent, that 'Damascus cannot fall until Aleppo falls.' The strength of the Syrian revolution was concentrated in the north, and we believed that once Aleppo was liberated, we could move southward toward Damascus."

That day, revolutionaries entered the Hamdaniya and New Aleppo districts of Aleppo city, after carrying out a double suicide attack with two car bombs. HTS-led forces captured five city districts, subsequently reaching the main square and captured parts of four other districts.

In Idlib and Aleppo governorates, revolutionaries captured 50 towns and villages, including the town of Saraqib, Abu al-Duhur and Maarat al-Numan amid the collapse of pro-government forces' defense lines. Pro-government forces retreated from most of the Idlib Governorate, with the exception of Khan Shaykhun and Kafranbel. In Aleppo region, pro-government forces withdrew to Aleppo airport, Maskanah, As Safirah and Khanaser road.

An airstrike, reportedly of Russian origin, killed 16 civilians and injured 20 others in Aleppo city.

=== Government withdrawal and SDF advances ===
Situation in Northwestern Syria by 1 December

In the early hours of 30 November, revolutionary forces captured the Citadel of Aleppo, the government headquarters in the city, as well as "more than half of Aleppo city". By morning, revolutionary forces had seized control of most of Aleppo, forcing pro-government troops to retreat toward as-Safirah.

On 30 November 2024, amid the collapse of pro-government forces in Northwestern Syria, the Kurdish majority Syrian Democratic Forces (SDF) entered the towns of Dayr Hafir, Tell Aran, Tell Hasel, and the Shaykh Najjar district of Aleppo city, taking over from pro-government forces. In the afternoon, the SDF captured Aleppo International Airport and the towns of Nubbul and Al-Zahraa, following the withdrawal of pro-government forces. Clashes between Turkish backed militias and the SDF were reported in Tell Abyad region in northern Raqqa Governorate.

Concurrently on 30 November, the Turkish-backed Syrian National Army located in the Euphrates Shield region of Turkish occupied northern Syria announced the start of Operation Dawn of Freedom with the objective of cutting off SDF's supply networks and establishing a corridor connecting al-Bab to Tell Rifaat. SNA forces captured the town of Tadef from pro-government forces during their advances as pro-government forces began withdrawing from the region.

Pro-government forces left a substantial amount of military equipment behind during their retreat from Aleppo governorate, including two T-90A tanks, an entire S-125 Neva system battery, a Pantsir-S1 system and a Buk-M2. Revolutionaries also captured helicopters and fighter jets at the Aleppo and Menagh air bases.

=== Clashes between SDF and opposition forces ===
On 30 November, the HTS-led opposition reportedly took control of Aleppo airport after the local SDF troops opted to withdraw. By afternoon on the next day, the SNA had captured the towns of as-Safirah, Khanasir, and the Kuweires airbase, while clashes occurred between SNA and SDF in the Sheikh Najjar district of Aleppo city. Concurrently HTS captured the thermal power plant, field artillery college, and the military academy on the outskirts of Aleppo.

On the evening of 1 December, the Turkish-backed Syrian National Army (SNA) launched an offensive on the SDF-held town of Tell Rifaat, capturing the town along with several surrounding villages. The remaining SDF-controlled towns in the region were cut off from communication after being encircled by opposition forces.

On 2 December, the SDF announced plans to evacuate Kurdish IDPs from Tel Rifaat and the Shahba Canton to SDF-held areas in Aleppo's Sheikh Maqsood district and northeastern Syria.

=== Battle of Hama ===
Situation in Northwestern Syria by 4 December

On the evening of 30 November 2024, HTS rapidly advanced in the Hama Governorate, capturing dozens of towns and villages in the countryside by 7 in the evening (Local Syrian time, UTC+3:00). As the HTS forces started closing in on Hama, pro-government forces established new military positions on the outskirts of the city, including reinforcements to Jabal Zayn al-Abidin and the towns of Taybat al Imam, Qamhana, and Khitab. Additionally, Russia launched airstrikes on towns recently captured by rebels in the Idlib and Hama regions. This includes one targeting a refugee camp in Idlib city that killed nine civilians and injured 62 others, and another airstrike targeting Aleppo university hospital killed eight civilians.

On 2 December, Russia again launched airstrikes on opposition-held territory, including one on Idlib city that killed 11 civilians. Opposition forces then launched a drone strike targeting pro-government military leaders near Jabal Zayn al-Abidin just north of Hama, which led to multiple deaths and injuries among their ranks. In the evening, the Russian forces carried out massive airstrikes against opposition forces, the heaviest clashes since the start of the offensive. By the end of the day, opposition forces took control of several villages and shelled Hama city, killing eight civilians, while government forces successfully defended Qalaat al-Madiq.

On 3 December, opposition forces captured more than 10 towns and villages near Hama, including the towns of Taybat al-Imam, Halfaya, Soran, and Maardis. Meanwhile, fighting between government forces and SNA were ongoing in Khanasir. North of Hama, at least 17 SAA soldiers, eight HTS fighters, and two civilians were killed in clashes and airstrikes.

On 4 December, pro-government forces briefly counterattacked and retook the villages of Kafr'a and Maar Shuhur, while the opposition advanced to the Ghab Plain, which serves as a gateway to the majority-Alawite coastal region of Syria. Anas Alkharboutli, a photographer working for DPA, was killed in an airstrike in Morek amidst the clashes near Hama. By the evening, opposition forces had cut off the roads connecting Hama to Raqqa and Aleppo and took control of several villages in the eastern Hama country side. Opposition forces also captured the towns of Khitab and Mubarakat, while fighting persisted in Jabal Zayn al-Abidin.

On 5 December, opposition forces entered the northeastern part of Hama city amid pro-government airstrikes on its eastern side and by the afternoon, HTS-led rebels had established full control over the city, as pro-government forces withdrew. In a statement, the Syrian government reasoned its withdrawal from Hama city in concurrence with "preserving the lives of civilians".

== Aftermath ==
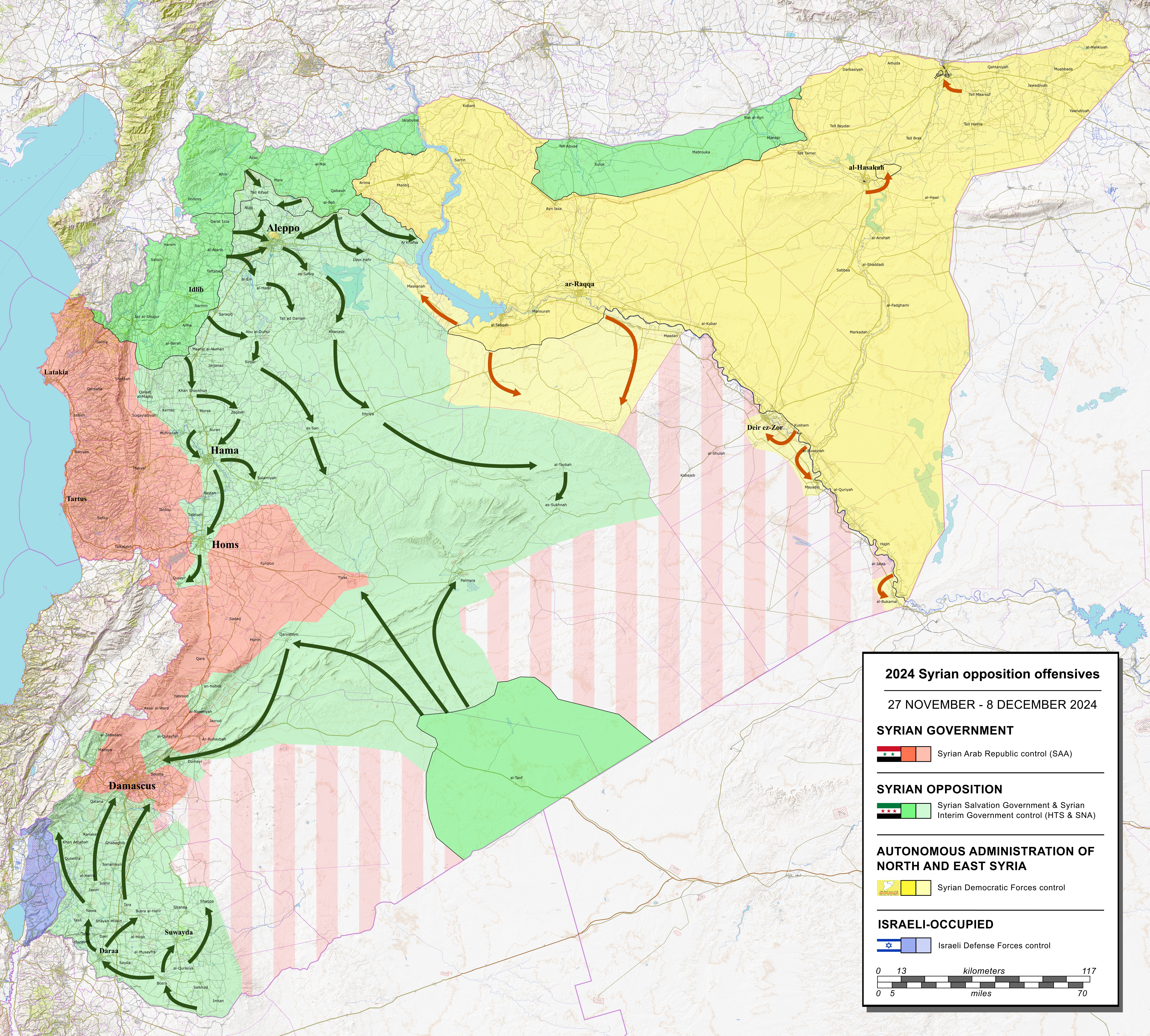
Situation in Syria after the fall of Homs

An operation towards Homs was launched by HTS following its capture of Hama on 5 December. On 7 December, HTS-led rebels had reached the outskirts of Homs city amid heavy fighting. At least seven civilians were killed in airstrikes and artillery fire. By the early morning of 8 December, HTS declared that they had fully captured the city of Homs, effectively cutting Latakia Governorate off from the rest of the country.

Also on 7 December, the Southern Operations Room, in co-ordination with the HTS-led Military Operations Command led forces that entered the Rif Dimashq region from the south, and those forces then came within 20 kilometres (12 mi) of the capital Damascus. The SAA withdrew from multiple points in the outskirts. Concurrently with the advance towards Damascus, the Syrian Free Army advanced into the capital from the southeast. By 8 December 2024, rebel forces entered the city's Barzeh neighborhood. According to official state reports in Russian mass media and media footage, President Bashar al-Assad left Damascus by air to Moscow, where he was granted asylum, sealing the fall of his regime.

== See also ==
- 2024 Syrian opposition offensives
  - Deir ez-Zor offensive (2024)
  - Southern Syria offensive (2024)
  - Palmyra offensive (2024)
- 1975 spring offensive
- 2021 Taliban offensive
