= 2024 Syrian opposition offensives =

HTS-led military operation of the Syrian civil war

- Part of the Syrian civil war
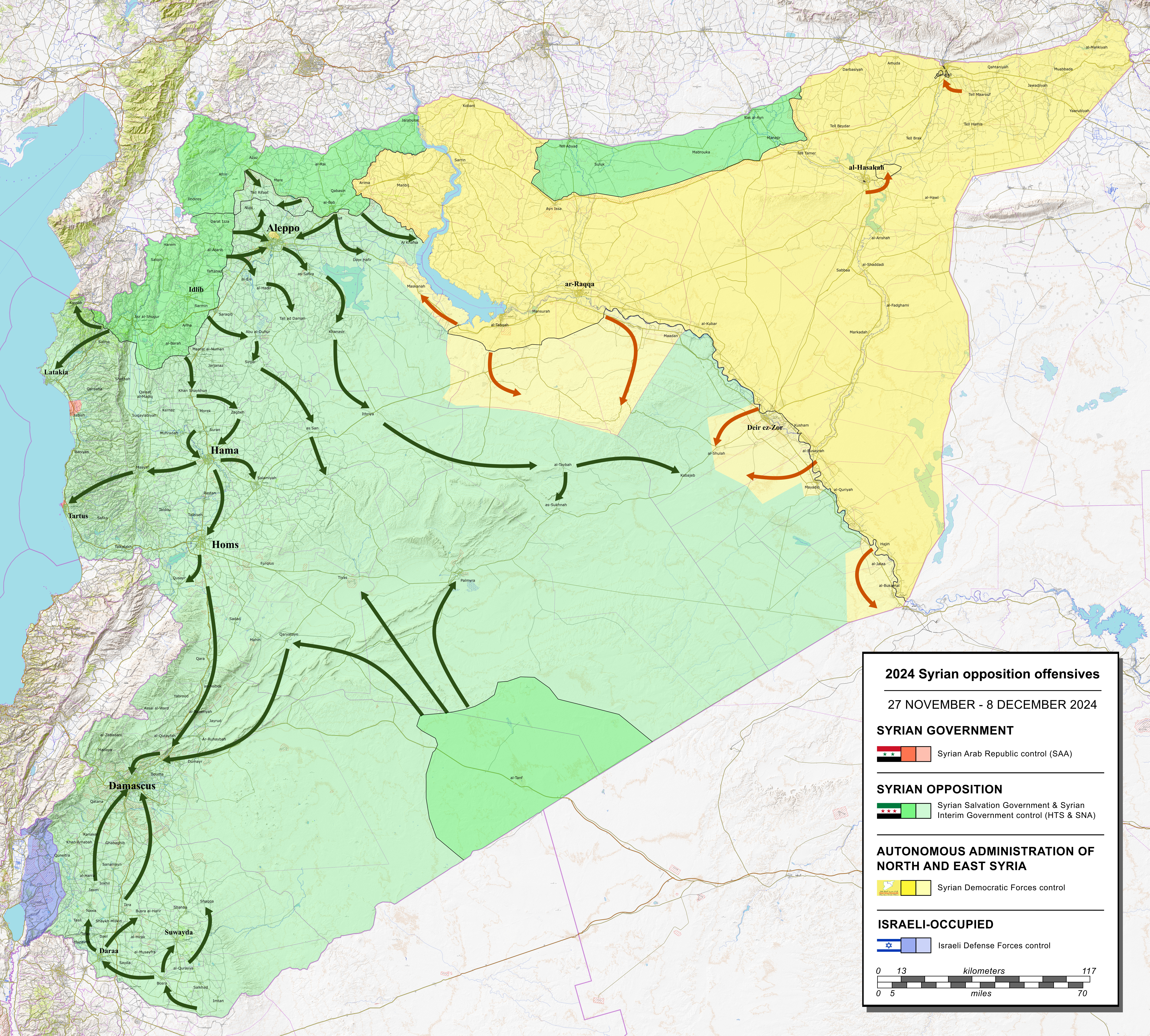
- Map of offensives in Syria Controlled by Ba'athist Syria Controlled by the Syrian opposition Controlled by the Syrian Democratic Forces Controlled by the Israel Defense Forces
Date	27 November – 8 December 2024 (1 week and 4 days)
Location	Syria
Result	Syrian opposition victory; Fall of the Assad regime; Establishment of the Syrian caretaker government; End of the Syrian civil war; Continued conflict in Syria
Territorial changes	Syrian opposition groups and Autonomous Administration of North and East Syria take control of Syria; Israel occupies most of Quneitra Governorate that had remained under Syrian control

Belligerents
Syrian Opposition: Syrian Salvation Government; (Syrian opposition) Syrian Interim Government; Jaysh al-Izza; (Syrian opposition) Suqour al-Sham Brigades; Ansar al-Tawhid; Turkistan Islamic Party in Syria; Imam Bukhari Jamaat; Ajnad al-Kavkaz; Jama'at Ansar al-Islam; (Syrian opposition) Southern Operations Room; (Syria) Decisive Battle Operations Room; (Syria) Burkan al-Furat; (Syria) Al-Busraya Revolutionaries; (Syrian opposition) Syrian Free Army; Supported by: Turkey (denied by Turkey); Ukraine (denied by Ukraine)	Ba'athist Syria; Iran; Russia; Hezbollah; Popular Mobilization Forces; (Palestine) Palestinian militias	Autonomous Administration of North and East Syria; CJTF–OIR; United States (Note: Armament support only.)

Commanders and leaders
Ahmed al-Sharaa; Murhaf Abu Qasra; (Syrian opposition) Ahmad al-Awda; (Syrian opposition) Salem Turki al-Antri	Bashar al-Assad; Abdul Karim Mahmoud Ibrahim; Suhayl al-Hasan; (Iran) Kioumars Pourhashemi †	Mazloum Abdi

Units involved
(Syrian opposition) Military Operations Command; Hay'at Tahrir al-Sham; Red Bands; Thermal Brigades; Liwa al-Muhajireen wal-Ansar; Katibat al-Tawhid wal-Jihad; Mujahidin Ghuroba Division; National Front for Liberation; Sham Legion; Ahrar al-Sham; Jaysh al-Ahrar; (Syrian opposition) Jaysh al-Nasr; Damascus Gathering; (Syrian opposition) Central Division; (Syrian opposition) 60th Infantry Division; Jaysh al-Izza; (Syrian opposition) Suqour al-Sham Brigades; Ansar al-Tawhid; (Syrian opposition) Syrian National Army; Nour al-Din al-Zenki Movement; (Syrian opposition) Dawn of Freedom Operations Room; Sultan Murad Division; (Syrian opposition) Levant Front; Jaysh al-Islam; Maghawir al-Sham; Liberation and Construction Movement; (Syrian opposition) Ahrar al-Sharqiya; Joint Force; Sultan Suleiman Shah Division; (Syrian opposition) Hamza Division; (Syrian opposition) Southern Operations Room; (Syrian opposition) 8th Brigade; (Syrian opposition) Central Committee; Sheikh al-Karama Forces; Men of Dignity; Al-Jabal Brigade; (Syria) Decisive Battle Operations Room; Al-Jabal Brigade; Men of Dignity; Sheikh al-Karama Forces; Faz‘at Shabab al-Jabal; Saraya al-Jabal; Tajammu‘ Abna’ al-Jabal; (Syria) Conquest of Damascus Military Operations Room	Syrian Armed Forces; Syrian Army; Syrian Air Force; National Defense Forces; Russian Armed Forces; Russian Air Force; Spetsnaz GRU; Islamic Revolutionary Guard Corps; Quds Force; (Hezbollah) Radwan Force	Syrian Democratic Forces; People's Defense Units; Women's Protection Units; Al-Bab Military Council; Manbij Military Council; Tabqa Military Council; Ashrafieh Liberation Forces; Sheikh Maqsoud Liberation Forces

Strength
15,000 (est. 2022); (Syrian opposition) 80,000 (est. 2025)	170,000 (2023); 50,000 (2023); At least 300 (2024)	100,000 (2021)

Casualties and losses
311 killed; (Syrian opposition) 60 killed; c. 1,000 killed (Assad government claim)	(Ba'athist Syria) 220 killed, 21 captured 25 pro-Iranian militiamen killed (Iran) 15 IRGC killed (Russia) 1+ killed	3 killed and several captured
- 111 civilians killed (Note: 95 killed by Russian and SAA air and artillery strikes and 13 killed by HTS shelling.); 370,000 civilians displaced

On 27 November 2024, a coalition of Syrian revolutionary factions called the Military Operations Command, led by Hay'at Tahrir al-Sham (HTS) and supported by allied Turkish-backed groups in the Syrian National Army (SNA), launched an offensive against the Ba'athist regime's armed forces in Idlib, Aleppo and Hama Governorates in Syria. It initially began as a localised offensive targeting towns in the Idlib and Aleppo countryside, later evolving into a nationwide campaign that culminated in the regime's collapse.

On 29 November, HTS entered Aleppo and captured most of the city, amid the collapse of pro-government forces. The next day, opposition forces made rapid advances, capturing dozens of towns and villages as pro-government forces disintegrated, and advanced toward Hama in central Syria, subsequently capturing it on 5 December. By 6 December, the SDF captured Deir ez-Zor in an offensive east of the Euphrates, while the newly formed Southern Operations Room and Al-Jabal Brigade captured Daraa and Suwayda in an offensive in the south. The HTS advanced further south toward Homs. The American-backed Syrian Free Army (SFA) launched the Palmyra offensive in the south of the country.

On 7 December 2024, Southern Operations Room forces entered the Rif Dimashq Governorate from the south, and came within 10 kilometers of the capital Damascus. Later, opposition forces were reported to have entered the suburbs of the capital. SFA forces moved towards the capital from the south east. By 8 December, they had captured Homs, which effectively cut Assad's forces from Syria's coast. The same day, rebels also captured Damascus, toppling Bashar al-Assad's government and ending the Assad family's 54-year-long rule over the country.

== Background ==
Since the March 2020 Idlib ceasefire agreement, large scale operations ceased between opposition and pro-government forces in Northwestern Syria. However, revolutionary groups based in northwestern Syria prepared for a resumption of hostilities, with HTS in particular strengthening its military capabilities by reforming its structures into a "conventional armed force", improving training, and setting up special forces specializing in raids and night-time operations. According to the Kyiv Post, some Islamist social media accounts said that the Idlib-based rebels received some training and other support by Ukraine's Main Directorate of Intelligence. Meanwhile, the Syrian government suffered from growing corruption, with researcher Charles Lister describing it as the "world's biggest narco-state" whose "corrupt business elite and a powerful network of military commanders, militia leaders and warlords" were held together by drug trade revenue, especially trade of Captagon. Starting in late 2022, HTS forces launched a series of infiltration and sniper attacks on government forces, leading up to the offensive. In retaliation, there was shelling of Idlib Governorate as well as Russian air strikes. Aleppo had been controlled by Bashar al-Assad's government and Iranian-backed militias since the Aleppo offensive in 2016.

According to Abu Hassan al-Hamwi, head of HTS's military wing, the offensive had been planned for a year prior to its launch. Beginning in 2019, HTS developed a military doctrine aimed at transforming loosely organized opposition and jihadist fighters into a conventional military force. The group established specialized military branches, most notably a drone unit that produced reconnaissance, attack, and suicide drones. HTS additionally established coordination with southern Syrian rebels, creating a unified command structure that incorporated leaders from approximately 25 rebel groups, with the strategic objective of encircling Damascus from multiple directions. HTS initiated the offensive partly to disrupt regional powers' diplomatic normalization with the Assad regime and to counter escalating aerial attacks on northwestern Syria. The group determined that Assad's international allies were strategically constrained, with Russia committed to its war in Ukraine and both Iran and Hezbollah engaged in conflict with Israel, presenting a favorable tactical opportunity.

In October 2024, a large mobilization by HTS and government forces was initiated in the Aleppo countryside, as the Syrian rebels reported that they had been preparing for months for a large-scale offensive against government forces within the city of Aleppo. On 26 November 2024, government forces artillery struck the opposition held town of Ariha, killing and injuring 16 civilians.

Planning by Syrian opposition forces for a military offensive against Aleppo began in late 2023 but was delayed by Turkish objections. Turkish president Recep Tayyip Erdoğan sought negotiations with the Assad government, to "determine Syria's future together," but received a negative response, following which he allowed the HTS-led opposition troops to begin their offensive against the Assad government.

== Offensive ==
On 27 November 2024, HTS announced that it had launched an offensive dubbed "Deterrence of Aggression" toward pro-government forces in western Aleppo Governorate. The offensive was a response to recent artillery shelling by the Syrian government of Bashar al-Assad against rebel-held Idlib, which killed at least 30 civilians.

On 6 December, in a face-to-face interview with CNN, Abu Muhammad al-Julani declared that the offensive's goal was to remove Assad from power. Using his birth name, Ahmed al-Sharaa, he explicitly pledged to protect minority groups and outlined plans for establishing a government grounded in institutions and a "council chosen by the people". He also expressed his intention to facilitate the return of Syrian refugees to their homes.

=== Opening advances ===
Situation in northwestern Syria on 28 November

During the first ten hours of the offensive, HTS captured 20 towns and villages from pro-government forces, including the towns of Urm al-Kubra, Anjara, Urum al-Sughra, Sheikh Aqil, Bara, Ajil, Awijil, al-Hawtah, Tal al-Dabaa, Hayr Darkal, Qubtan al-Jabal, al-Saloum, al-Qasimiyah, Kafr Basin, Hawr, Anaz and Basratoun. In addition, the 46th regiment base of government forces was besieged by the HTS and captured a few hours later. The Syrian Observatory for Human Rights reported that 37 Syrian government soldiers and allied militias and 60 fighters from the opposition forces were killed in the clashes. A Russian special forces unit was ambushed by rebels, who later posted photos of a dead Russian soldier and captured equipment. In response, Syrian and Russian forces launched aerial assaults on areas controlled by revolutionary groups. Russian fighters also conducted airstrikes around Atarib, Darat Izza, and surrounding villages, while government forces shelled rebel-controlled Idlib, Ariha, Sarmada and other areas in southern Idlib Governorate.

On 28 November, HTS launched an offensive on the eastern Idlib countryside, capturing the villages of Dadikh, Kafr Batikh and Sheikh Ali as well as a neighborhood in the city of Saraqib. This advance brought them within two kilometers of the M5 highway, a strategic route that had been secured by pro-government forces in 2020. HTS also attacked al-Nayrab's airport located east of Aleppo, where Iranian-backed militants have a presence. In the latter half of the day, HTS captured the villages of Kafr Basin, Arnaz and Al-Zarba in the western Aleppo countryside, and cut off the M5 highway. The Syrian rebels had captured around 40 towns and villages in total by the end of the day.

A Russian airstrike killed fifteen civilians in Atarib in the western Aleppo countryside. Four others were killed in either a Syrian or Russian airstrike in Darat Izza. Iranian state media reported that Islamic Revolutionary Guard Corps (IRGC) Brigadier General Kioumars Pourhashemi, who served as a senior military advisor in Syria, was killed by rebels in Aleppo. An SDF fighter was killed by Turkish drone strike in the north of Raqqah Governorate.

On 29 November, HTS captured the villages of Tal Karatabeen, Abu Qansa, and Al-Talhiya in Idlib countryside and Al-Mansoura, Jab Kas, and Al-Bawabiya in Aleppo countryside. Strong fighting around the town of Saraqib continued. By this point, other Idlib-based Islamist groups were backing the HTS advance, including Ajnad al-Kavkaz, and Liwa al-Muhajireen wal-Ansar. Four civilians were killed and two others were injured by HTS shelling in the al-Hamdaniya neighborhood of Aleppo city. An attack by the SDF was carried near Al-Bab with 15 SNA fighters dying. Seven SNA fighters were killed in a Russian airstrike on a SNA military headquarters in Mare'. Four civilians were also killed in separate Russian airstrikes in Idlib.

=== Battle of Aleppo ===
On 29 November, opposition forces launched a large-scale offensive in Aleppo Governorate aimed at capturing the city of Aleppo and surrounding areas. The rapid fall of Aleppo, which had taken the regime four years to capture from rebels in 2016, surprised even HTS leadership. Al-Hamwi later stated "We had a conviction, supported by historical precedent, that 'Damascus cannot fall until Aleppo falls.' The strength of the Syrian revolution was concentrated in the north, and we believed that once Aleppo was liberated, we could move southward toward Damascus."

That day, revolutionaries entered the Hamdaniya and New Aleppo districts of Aleppo city, after carrying out a double suicide attack with two car bombs. HTS-led forces captured five city districts, subsequently reaching the main square and captured parts of four other districts.

In Idlib and Aleppo governorates, revolutionaries captured 50 towns and villages, including the town of Saraqib, Abu al-Duhur and Maarat al-Numan amid the collapse of pro-government forces' defense lines. Pro-government forces retreated from most of the Idlib Governorate, with the exception of Khan Shaykhun and Kafranbel. In Aleppo region, pro-government forces withdrew to Aleppo airport, Maskanah, As Safirah and Khanaser road.

An airstrike, reportedly of Russian origin, killed 16 civilians and injured 20 others in Aleppo city.

=== Government withdrawal and SDF advances ===
In the early hours of 30 November, revolutionary forces captured the Citadel of Aleppo, the government headquarters in the city, as well as "more than half of Aleppo city". By morning, revolutionary forces had seized control of most of Aleppo, forcing pro-government troops to retreat toward as-Safirah.

On 30 November 2024, amid the collapse of pro-government forces in Northwestern Syria, the Kurdish majority Syrian Democratic Forces (SDF) entered the towns of Dayr Hafir, Tell Aran, Tell Hasel, and the Shaykh Najjar district of Aleppo city, taking over from pro-government forces. In the afternoon, the SDF captured Aleppo International Airport and the towns of Nubbul and Al-Zahraa, following the withdrawal of pro-government forces. Clashes between Turkish backed militias and the SDF were reported in Tell Abyad region in northern Raqqa Governorate.

Concurrently on 30 November, the Turkish-backed Syrian National Army located in the Euphrates Shield region of Turkish occupied northern Syria announced the start of Operation Dawn of Freedom with the objective of cutting off SDF's supply networks and establishing a corridor connecting al-Bab to Tell Rifaat. SNA forces captured the town of Tadef from pro-government forces during their advances as pro-government forces began withdrawing from the region.

Pro-government forces left a substantial amount of military equipment behind during their retreat from Aleppo governorate, including two T-90A tanks, an entire S-125 Neva system battery, a Pantsir-S1 system and a Buk-M2. Revolutionaries also captured helicopters and fighter jets at the Aleppo and Menagh air bases.

=== Clashes between SDF and opposition forces ===
On 30 November, the HTS-led opposition reportedly took control of Aleppo airport after the local SDF troops opted to withdraw. By afternoon on the next day, the SNA had captured the towns of as-Safirah, Khanasir, and the Kuweires airbase, while clashes occurred between SNA and SDF in the Sheikh Najjar district of Aleppo city. Concurrently HTS captured the thermal power plant, field artillery college, and the military academy on the outskirts of Aleppo.

On the evening of 1 December, the Turkish-backed Syrian National Army (SNA) launched an offensive on the SDF-held town of Tell Rifaat, capturing the town along with several surrounding villages. The remaining SDF-controlled towns in the region were cut off from communication after being encircled by opposition forces.

On 2 December, the SDF announced plans to evacuate Kurdish IDPs from Tel Rifaat and the Shahba Canton to SDF-held areas in Aleppo's Sheikh Maqsood district and northeastern Syria.

=== Advance towards Hama ===
Map of the offensive on 4 December

On the evening of 30 November 2024, HTS-led opposition forces rapidly advanced in the Hama Governorate, capturing dozens of towns and villages in the countryside by 7 in the evening (Local Syrian time, UTC+3:00). As the HTS forces started closing in on Hama, pro-government forces established new military positions on the outskirts of the city, including reinforcements to Jabal Zayn al-Abidin and the towns of Taybat al Imam, Qamhana, and Khitab. Additionally, Russia launched airstrikes on towns recently captured by rebels in the Idlib and Hama regions. This includes one targeting a refugee camp in Idlib city that killed nine civilians and injured 62 others, and another airstrike targeting Aleppo university hospital killed eight civilians.

On 2 December, Russia again launched airstrikes on opposition-held territory, including one on Idlib city that killed 11 civilians. Opposition forces then launched a drone strike targeting pro-government military leaders near Jabal Zayn al-Abidin just north of Hama, which led to multiple deaths and injuries among their ranks. In the evening, the Russian forces carried out massive airstrikes against opposition forces, the heaviest clashes since the start of the offensive. By the end of the day, opposition forces took control of several villages and shelled Hama city, killing eight civilians, while government forces successfully defended Qalaat al-Madiq.

On 3 December, opposition forces captured more than 10 towns and villages near Hama, including the towns of Taybat al-Imam, Halfaya, Soran, and Maardis. Meanwhile, fighting between government forces and SNA were ongoing in Khanasir. North of Hama, at least 17 SAA soldiers, eight HTS fighters, and two civilians were killed in clashes and airstrikes.

On 4 December, pro-government forces briefly counterattacked and retook the villages of Kafr'a and Maar Shuhur, while the opposition advanced to the Ghab Plain, which serves as a gateway to the majority-Alawite coastal region of Syria. Anas Alkharboutli, a photographer working for DPA, was killed in an airstrike in Morek amidst the clashes near Hama. By the evening, opposition forces had cut off the roads connecting Hama to Raqqa and Aleppo and took control of several villages in the eastern Hama country side. Opposition forces also captured the towns of Khitab and Mubarakat, while fighting persisted in Jabal Zayn al-Abidin.

On 5 December, opposition forces entered the northeastern part of Hama city amid pro-government airstrikes on its eastern side and by the afternoon, HTS-led rebels had established full control over the city, as pro-government forces withdrew. In a statement, the Syrian government reasoned its withdrawal from Hama city in concurrence with "preserving the lives of civilians".

Following the fall of Hama, Hezbollah announced it was sending fighters across the border toward Hama and Homs to support government forces.

=== Battle of Homs ===
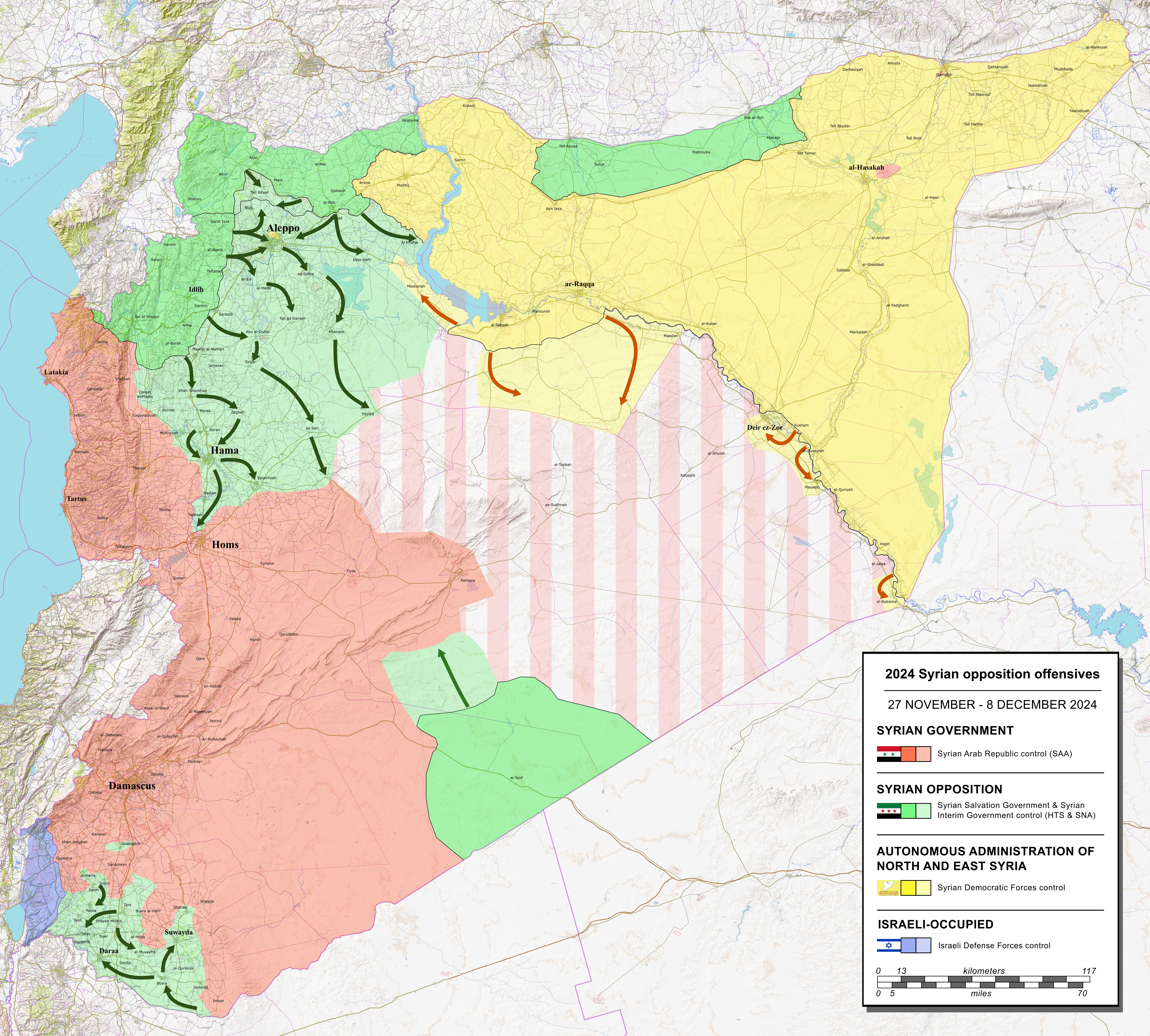
Map of the offensive on 6 December

On 5 December 2024, pro-government forces withdrew from the cities of Salamiyah and Talbiseh towards the city of Homs, hours after their withdrawal from Hama as rebels approached the former town's outskirts. In the evening, opposition forces entered Salamiyah without fighting, after reaching an agreement with the city's elders and its religious Ismaili council. By the evening opposition forces had reached the outskirts of Al-Rastan and captured a pro-government military base north of it. Concurrently with the opposition advance, Russian aircraft bombed the main bridge connecting Homs and Hama, in an attempt to slow the rebel advance.

On 6 December 2024, opposition forces captured five towns, and approached the outskirts of Homs, as pro-government forces withdrew from more territory. In the eastern Deir ez-Zor Governorate, pro-government forces began withdrawing from the towns of Deir ez-Zor, Mayadin, Al-Quriyah and Abu Kamal, towards the capital Damascus. By the afternoon, pro-government forces had reportedly completely withdrawn from Homs towards the city of Latakia, with only local pro-government gunmen remaining in the Shia majority neighborhoods of the city. The Syrian Defense Ministry denied reports that it had given orders to fully evacuate Homs city.

Iran began withdrawing its personnel from Syria in the early hours of 6 December, pulling out top commanders of the IRGC's Quds Force and ordering evacuations at the Iranian Embassy in Damascus and at IRGC bases across Syria. Evacuating Iranians headed towards Lebanon and Iraq.

On 7/8 December, it was confirmed that the Ba'athist Syrian forces withdrew from Homs, with revolutionaries afterwards shown to be celebrating in the city. This effectively cut Assad's forces, including those based from Damascus, from Syria's west coast, which houses the country's Russian bases.

=== Capture of Daraa, Suwayda, Deir ez-Zor and Palmyra ===
In the evening of 6 December 2024, local forces captured the regional capital of Suwayda, in southern Syria, following the pro-Assad forces' withdrawal from the city. Concurrently, SDF captured the provincial capital of Deir ez-Zor from pro-Ba'athist forces, which also left the town of Palmyra in central Homs Governorate. By midnight, opposition forces in the southern Daraa Governorate captured its capital Daraa, as well as 90% of the province, as pro-government forces withdrew towards the capital Damascus. Meanwhile, the Syrian Free Army, a different rebel group backed by the United States, took control of Palmyra in an offensive launched from the al-Tanf "deconfliction zone".

On 7 December 2024, pro-Assad forces withdrew from the Quneitra Governorate, which borders the Israeli-occupied Golan Heights. That day, the Israeli army helped the UNDOF repel an attack.

=== Fall of Damascus ===
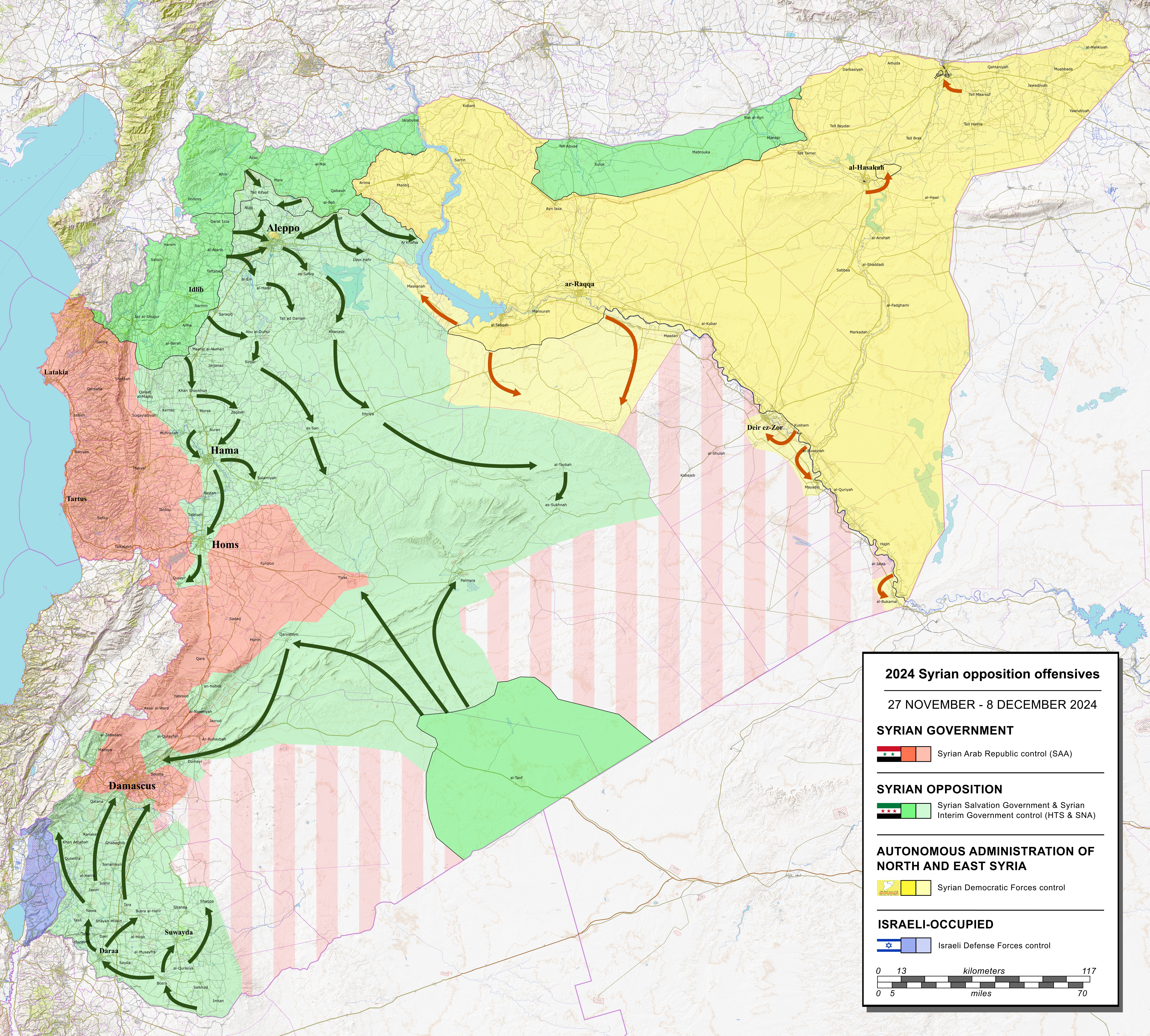
Situation in Syria before the Fall of Damascus, 8 December

On 7 December 2024, revolutionary forces entered the Rif Dimashq Governorate from the south, and came within 20 kilometres (12 mi) of the capital Damascus. Concurrently with the advance towards Damascus, revolutionary forces in the north launched an offensive into Homs city. In the Rif Dimashq region, pro-Assad forces withdrew from the towns of Assal al-Ward, Yabroud, Flitah, Al-Naseriyah and Artouz, while rebels came within 10 kilometres (6.2 mi) of Damascus. By the evening, pro-Assad forces had left the towns on the outskirts of Damascus, including Jaramana, Qatana, Muadamiyat al-Sham, Darayya, Al-Kiswah, Al-Dumayr and sites near the Mezzeh Air Base. Revolutionary forces were later reported to have reached the suburbs of Damascus. Later that day, Bashar al-Assad fled the city, making a stopover at the Russian-operated Khmeimim Air Base near Latakia before proceeding to Moscow where he was given asylum by the Russian government. On 16 December, the Telegram account of the Syrian presidency published a statement attributed to Assad saying that he had gone to a Russian military base in Latakia Governorate "to oversee combat operations" following the fall of Damascus but was evacuated out of the country by Russia after coming under siege from rebel forces, adding that he had no intention of resigning or going into exile.

In the early hours of 8 December 2024, revolutionary groups in the north captured Homs, and began advancing towards Damascus. It was also reported that rebels managed to enter the Damascus neighborhood of Barzeh. On that day, the Syrian Army command informed its officers that Assad's government had ended, and Prime Minister Mohammad Ghazi al-Jalali announced that he was ready "to cooperate with any leadership chosen by the people".

=== Closing offensives ===
Map of the offensive

After the capture of Damascus by the Southern Operations Room, Latakia and Tartus were the last two regional capitals held by Ba'athist forces. Anti-regime protests broke out in Latakia and later in Tartus, as demonstrators began to tear down posters and topple statues of Hafez al-Assad. On 8 December, the HTS began advancing on both cities, capturing them without a battle.

== Resumed conflict ==
Following the 2024 Manbij offensive, Turkish involvement in the Syrian civil war continued in mid-December with the 2024 Kobani offensive.

In December 2024, the factions supported by Turkey announced they would discontinue the ceasefire with groups supported by the US, such as Syrian Democratic Forces. One news article noted: "The SNA, an umbrella of several armed factions, informed the SDF on Monday that it would be returning to 'a state of combat against us,' one of the sources briefing Al-Monitor said. The sources said negotiations between the SDF and the SNA had 'failed' and that 'significant military buildups' in areas east and west of the Kurdish town of Kobani on the Turkish border were being observed."

On 23 January, the Hay'at Tahrir al-Sham led military operation rooms captured areas near the Zamla oil field.

Clashes with Ba'athist remnants were also reported in western Syria.

== Reactions ==
=== Domestic ===
- Ba'athist Syria: The Syrian Arab Army (SAA) described the offensive as "a huge and large-scale terrorist attack" in which "large numbers of terrorists using medium and heavy weapons" targeted villages, towns, and military sites. On 30 November, the Syrian government announced a "temporary troop withdrawal" from Aleppo. On 30 November, a pro-government commentator on Syrian state TV said that "reinforcements and Russia's assistance would repel the terrorist groups" and blamed Turkey for supporting the insurgents' push into Aleppo and Idlib provinces. In a phone call with Iranian president Masoud Pezeshkian, President Bashar al-Assad said the offensive was aimed at "dividing the region and fragmenting the countries in it and redraw the map in line with the objectives of the United States and the West".
- Syrian opposition: Hassan Abdul Ghani, spokesperson for the Syrian revolutionary coalition, stated that the targets of the operation are Assad's forces, Russian Army and Iranian militias, whom he accused of bringing "devastation, death, and killing to the region" while "exploiting Arab and Muslim populations" to push their "sabotaging plans" under "the guise of resistance".
- Democratic Autonomous Administration of North and East Syria: The Syrian Democratic Forces (SDF) announced a general mobilization in response to rebel advances in Aleppo and released a statement condemning the resurgence of violence, which it blamed on the Syrian government and Turkish occupation.

=== International ===
- EU: Kaja Kallas, Vice President of the European Commission, congratulated the rebels for toppling the Assad regime, noting it "a historic moment", and vowed to keep supporting the aspiration of Syrian people.
- Iran: Foreign Minister Abbas Araghchi described the offensive as "a plot orchestrated by the U.S. and the Zionist regime following the regime's defeat in Lebanon and Palestine". Mojtaba Damirchiloo, Assistant Minister of Foreign Affairs of Iran and Director General of the Eurasia Department also claimed Ukraine was supplying rebels. After the toppling of the Assad regime, government spokesperson Fatemeh Mohajerani called for "respect for Syria's territorial integrity" and further stated that the Syrian people should decide their own fate.
- Russia: Presidential spokesperson Dmitry Peskov called the offensive "a violation of Syria's sovereignty in this region". Russia also blamed Ukraine for the involvement.
- Turkey: The foreign ministry called for an end to the airstrikes on Idlib and demanded that "greater instability is avoided and civilians are not harmed". President Recep Tayyip Erdogan criticised Assad for refusing his offers of negotiations and claimed "the target, of course, is Damascus. The opposition's march continues. Our wish is that this march in Syria continues without accidents."
- Ukraine: Ukraine issued a statement blaming Russia and Iran as well as the actions of the Assad government in refusing internal dialogue for the destabilisation of Syria. Ukraine also denied accusations by Iran and Russia that it was supporting rebels in the offensive.
- United States: White House National Security Council spokesperson Sean Savett released a statement stating "The United States has nothing to do with this offensive, which is led by Hay'at Tahrir al-Sham (HTS), a designated terrorist organization". President-elect Donald Trump responded to the offensives by stating the US should not intervene, remarking "this is not our fight" and to "let it play out".

Organizations

- Hezbollah: Following the capture of Hama, Hezbollah secretary-general Naim Qassem pledged that "Hezbollah will be by Syria's side against this aggression," which he said was sponsored by the United States and Israel.

== Involvement of other countries ==
=== Russia ===
Russia has conducted joint airstrikes with the Syrian Arab Army against the rebels. Starting 2 December, Russian warships began leaving the Tartus naval base.

=== Iran ===
Iran said it "firmly" supported the Assad regime. Prior to the rebel capture of Aleppo, Iranian General Kioumars Pourhashemi was killed by the rebels during clashes. On 5 December, Iranian General Javad Ghafari arrived in Syria to help the Syrian government. By 7 December, Iran had withdrawn some military and diplomatic personnel from Syria. Government spokesperson Mohajerani said that 4,000 Iranian citizens had returned home from Syria on board 10 flights organized by Iranian airline Mahan Air.

=== Israel ===
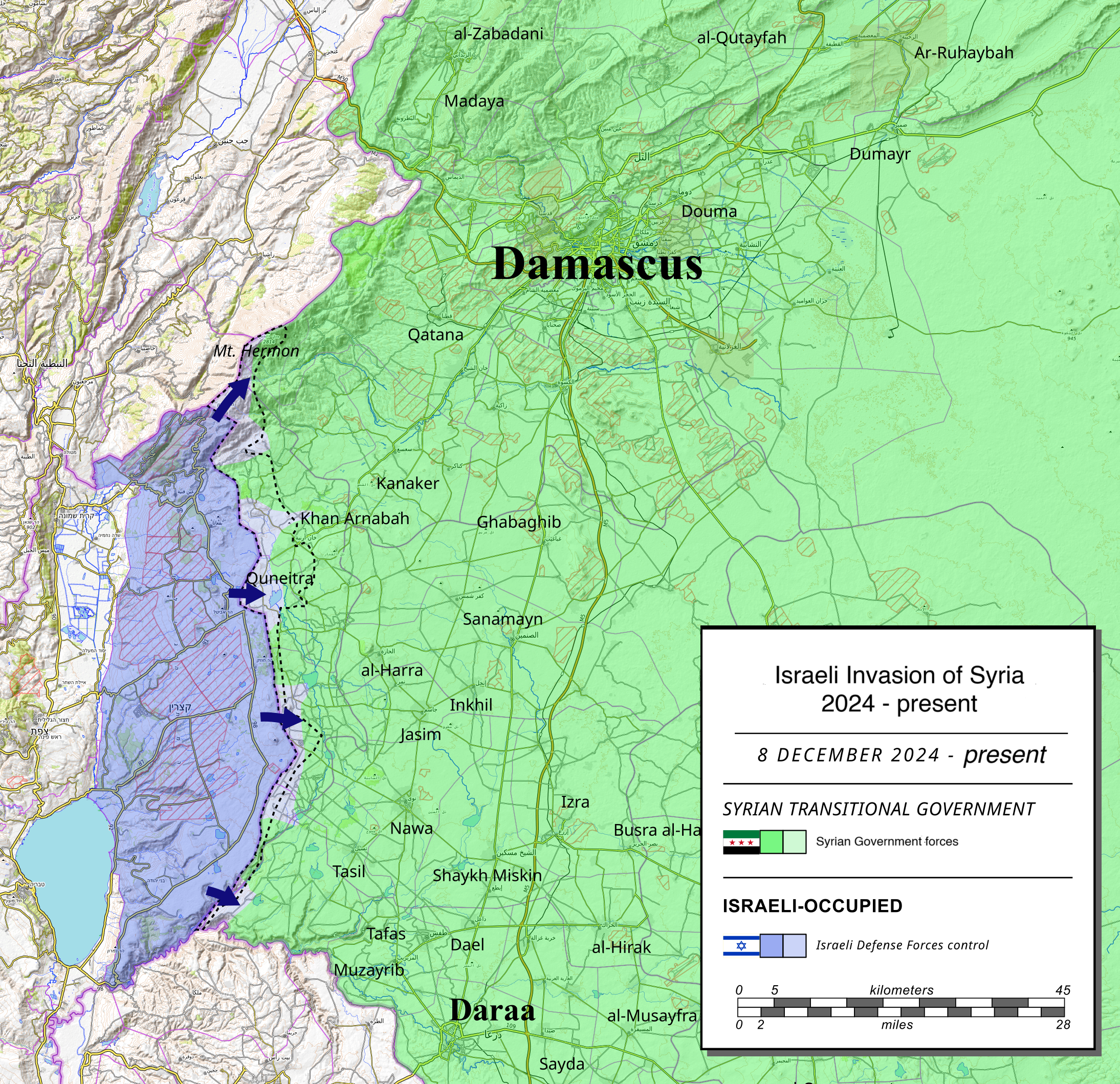
Israeli-occupied Golan Heights and Israeli invasion of Syria in 2024

Israel conducted airstrikes on Hezbollah weapons depots inside Syria, after Hezbollah pledged backing for Assad and claimed to have sent "supervising forces". Israel warned Iran against sending support to the Assad government and prevented Iranian planes from landing in Damascus. Israeli Prime Minister Benjamin Netanyahu took credit for the fall of the Assad government.

Israel also bombed Syrian government weapons depots believed to contain chemical weapons to prevent them from falling into another party's hands. As the Southern Operations Room seized control of southern Syria, the IDF announced the deployment of additional air force and army units to the Golan Heights.

=== Turkey ===
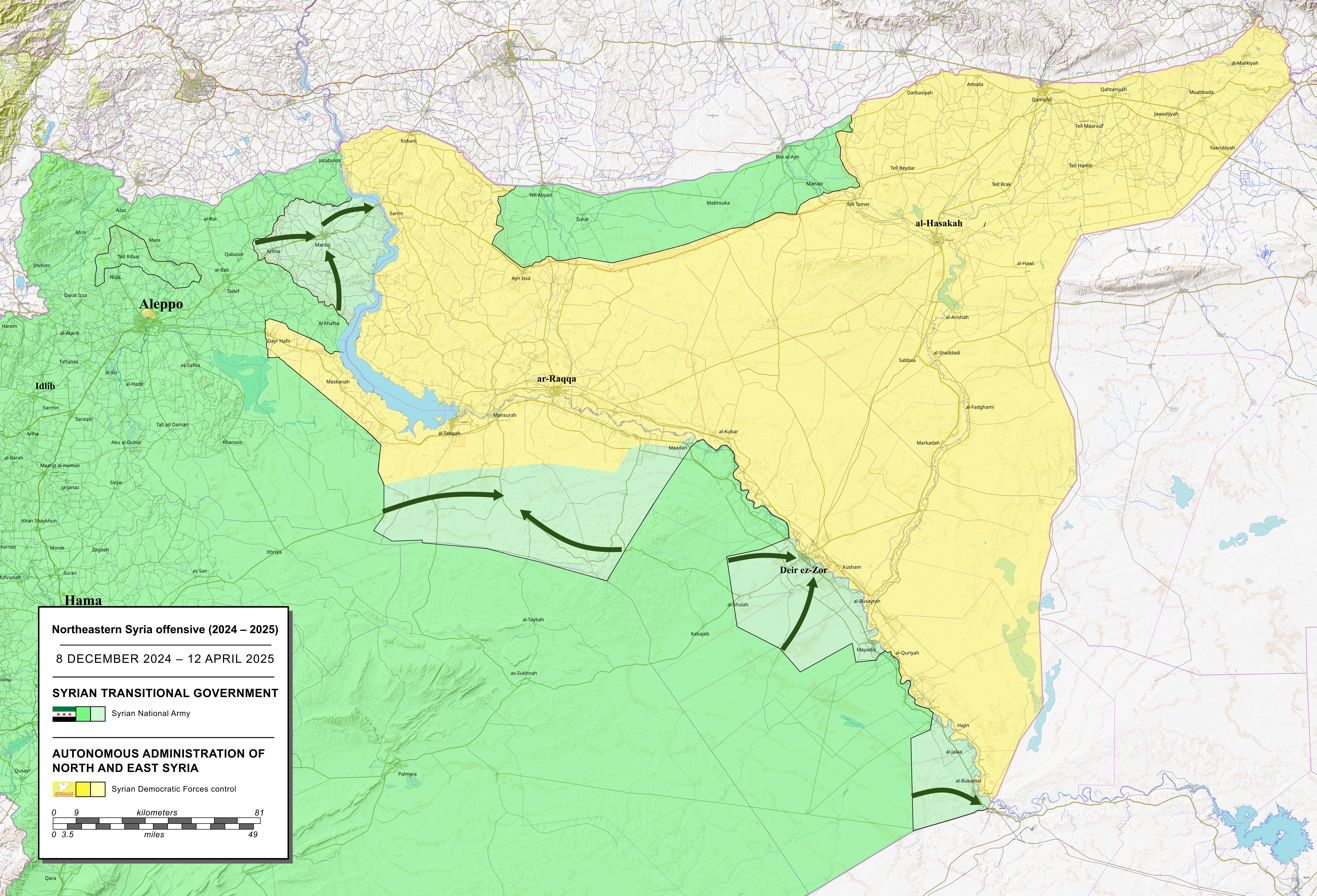
Manbij offensive on 6–9 December 2024

The Guardian reported "It is widely assumed Turkey broadly approved of the HTS-led offensive in advance but Turkey denies this." During a meeting in Doha between Sergey Lavrov, Abbas Araghchi and Hakan Fidan, the Russian and Iranian foreign ministers both tacitly blamed Turkey for the downfall of Assad regime.

Despite the collapse of the Assad regime, Turkey and Turkish-backed SNA fighters in northern Syria continued to attack U.S.-backed SDF forces. On 9 December, SNA fighters captured the city of Manbij.

=== Ukraine ===
Ukraine was known to have provided training and equipment to the Syrian opposition in the preparation of offensive. The Ukrainian HUR was also alleged to have dispatched advisors to the rebels to coordinate this offensive as well as intelligence and material support to opposition forces including HTS.

== Analysis ==
Hezbollah, which was a "major ally" of the Syrian government during the civil war, was severely weakened during its war with Israel since October 2023. The deaths of Hassan Nasrallah and much of its military leadership, combined with the redeployment of Hezbollah fighters in Syria back to Lebanon, left a large power vacuum. With the Russian military concentrating on its invasion of Ukraine and Iran under significant pressure, it provided an opportunity for rebel groups to launch an offensive.

According to Nick Heras, an analyst with the New Lines Institute for Strategy and Policy, the rebels were trying to pre-empt a Syrian government offensive which was being shaped by Russian and Syrian airstrikes on rebel areas. The presence of Turkish-backed groups in the offensive was believed to be a warning from Turkey to Russia and the Syrian government to avoid any offensives in the region.

Prior to the fall of the Assad government, the Institute for the Study of War (ISW) assessed that if this were to occur, it would damage the global perception of Russia as an effective partner and protector which together with the loss of bases in Syria which are the primary logistical hubs for shipments from Russia sent to Libya and eventually sub-Saharan Africa would undermine Russia's goals of expanding its influence in Africa. Tartus base is Russia's only formal overseas naval base and links Russia's Black Sea assets to the Mediterranean and is central for future expansion plans in the Mediterranean and Red Seas, which would threaten NATO's southern flank. The ISW analysed that the Africa Corps, while the easiest to deploy to Syria, lacks the numbers to make a difference and its limited forces are already overstretched across Africa or recalled to fight in Kursk to repel the Ukrainian incursion into Russia. Following the fall of the Assad government, while analysts at the Atlantic Council saw the development as a huge loss for Russia, they also believed that Russia could salvage Assad's loss, as they could potentially hold onto their bases in Syria (which later proved to be the case for now, though remain in limbo); additionally, the incoming HTS administration would not be an overt pro-Western government.

According to analysts, Syrian government defeats can largely be attributed to its confidence in an ultimate victory over the rebels and the lack of effort it has put in strengthening its military ranks over the four years since the Idlib ceasefire in 2020. Pointing to the prevalence of unwilling and poorly paid young conscripts in the army, observers noted that Iran would be hesitant to provide Assad with needed ground support. Analysts have also said that Russia sees little purpose to intervene more forcefully against the rebels, beyond some limited airstrikes, given the perceived ineffectiveness of Assad's forces.

Russian analysts generally blamed al-Assad for losing the war. Speaking to Komsomolskaya Pravda, Semyon Bagdasarov argued that the Syrian government failed to motivate its troops and to unite the various Syrian ethnic and religious groups around its cause. Similarly, political scientist Andrey Kortunov wrote that al-Assad had failed to unite Syrians and achieve national reconciliation, comparing him to former Afghan president Ashraf Ghani, who was overthrown by the Taliban in 2021. Journalist Vitaly Ryumshin shared this comparison, but partially defended the Syrian government, arguing that the lack of reform was due to economic sanctions on the country and loss of control over the oil's resources to the United States and the Kurds. In a different view, Anton Mardasov, a Russian expert on the Middle East, told Nezavisimaya Gazeta that the government's collapse was not due to Western sanctions but because of al-Assad's failure in dealing with the country's problems, specifically mentioning the economic crisis, endemic corruption and nepotism and "the loss of touch with reality and thinking in the paradigm of 50 years ago".

According to The Sunday Telegraph, the collapse of the Assad regime carries repercussions for both Russia and Iran due to their investment on the survival of the regime; Iran's Axis of Resistance had effectively collapsed with the loss of Assad's rule in Syria, undermining Iran's ability to supply Hezbollah, while Russia's invasion of Ukraine distracted Putin from Syria and exposed his struggle to keep supporting Russia's allies in Latin America and Africa (in particular Mali, Burkina Faso and Niger).

In the months following the fall of the regime, analyses and reports indicated that Russia had grown increasingly dissatisfied with what it viewed as Bashar al-Assad’s "obstinacy" and "unwillingness" to compromise. Moscow had long sought to broker an agreement between the moderate secular opposition and the Damascus government, proposing manageable concessions such as granting ministerial portfolios. Russian frustration was further exacerbated by al-Assad’s failure to capitalize on regional normalization efforts, specifically Arab and Turkish diplomatic openings and partial Western engagement, for which Russia had actively worked to create opportunities.

== See also ==
- Battle of Aleppo (2012–2016)
- Northwestern Syria offensive (April–June 2015)
- National Front for Liberation–Tahrir al-Sham conflict
- Northwestern Syria offensive (April–August 2019)
- Operation Spring Shield (2020)
- Timeline of the Syrian civil war (November 2024–present)
- 2026 northeastern Syria offensive
- AANES–Syria relations
- Second Gulf of Sidra offensive
- 2021 Taliban offensive
- 1975 spring offensive
- Arab normalization with Syria
- Syrian–Turkish normalization
