= Baqir Brigade =

Syrian loyalist militia

- لواء الباقر
- One of the Baqir Brigade's logos; the militia also used other symbols, including the regular Syrian Ba'athist flag
- Leader: Khalid al-Hassan
- Dates active: 2012 (Note: The militia claims to have been founded around 2012, while pro-Syrian opposition media argues that it was set up in 2015. The earliest evidence of the group's existence traces to 2014.)– 2024
- Allegiance: Ba'athist Syria
- Ideology: Shia jihadism Syrian nationalism Anti-Zionism
- Size: c. 3,000 (Note: In 2016, the Baqir Brigade claimed to have 3,000 members, while the Syrian opposition argued that it only had about 2,000 fighters. In 2018, The New York Times estimated that the group had around 3,000 fighters.)
- Part of: (Syria) Local Defence Forces; Axis of Resistance
- Wars: Syrian Civil War; Battle of Aleppo (2012–2016); Operation Canopus Star (claimed); Aleppo offensive (October–December 2015); Northern Aleppo offensive (February 2016); 2016 Southern Aleppo campaign; Aleppo offensive (October–November 2016); Aleppo offensive (November–December 2016); Siege of Nubl and Al-Zahraa; Syrian Desert campaign (May–July 2017); Central Syria campaign (2017); Battle of Deir ez-Zor (September–November 2017); Battle of Khasham; Operation Olive Branch; Northwestern Syria offensive (December 2019–March 2020); Syrian Desert campaign (December 2017–present); Northwestern Syria clashes (December 2022–November 2024); 2024 Syrian opposition offensives (surrendered)

The Baqir Brigade (Arabic: لواء الباقر; Liwa al-Baqir), was a Syrian militia which fought for the Ba'athist government during the Syrian civil war. The militia was one of the most prominent and largest pro-government militias from the Aleppo area and part of the "Local Defence Forces" network. Its members mostly consists of tribesmen from the al-Baggara tribe that traditionally supported the rule of the al-Assad family despite being mostly Sunni Muslim. Though the militia's fighters thus come from a largely Sunni background, many of them have converted to or are at least strongly influenced by Shia Islam. The Baqir Brigade has also been noted for its strong connections to the Lebanese Hezbollah, Iran, and various Shiite Iraqi militias, and was thus generally considered to be a Shia or "Shi'ified" fighting force. Despite its alleged loyalty to the Assad government and Iran, the militia mutinied and defected to insurgents during the 2024 Syrian opposition offensives.

== History ==
=== Foundation and early operations ===
There are conflicting accounts on when and how the Baqir Brigade was founded. The unit itself and its supporters claim that it was set up in 2012, just after the start of the Battle of Aleppo. Its founders were the brothers Khalid al-Hassan (nom de guerre: "al-Hajj Khalid" or "al-Hajj Baqir") and Abu al-Abbas (nom de guerre: "al-Hajj Hamza") who had fought as volunteers with Hezbollah during the 2006 Lebanon War and started the Baqir Brigade after their father and older brother had been killed by rebels. Their unit initially had only 13 members, but allegedly soon managed to garner hundreds of recruits due to the charisma and military talent of the two brothers. According to this version, the brothers' militia also helped to break the siege of Aleppo's central prison during Operation Canopus Star in 2013/14.

On the other side, the pro-opposition site alSouria.net argued that the Baqir Brigade was founded as part of the Local Defence Forces in 2015. With its fighters trained by Iraqi Shia militants and put under the protection of the Berri family (which is well known for its support of the al-Assad family), alSouria.net claimed that the militia was an attempt to create more native Shia pro-government units. Around this time, the Baqir Brigade reportedly operated under the leadership of the Iraqi Harakat Hezbollah al-Nujaba, which also equipped its members. Regional expert Aymenn Jawad Al-Tamimi found evidence for the Baqir Brigade's existence as far back as 2014. He argues that some kind of militia led by Khalid and Abu al-Abbas indeed originated in 2012, but that this earlier formation was reorganized or consolidated into the present-day Baqir Brigade only as part of the Local Defence Forces with strong Iranian and Hezbollah support around 2014.

=== Operations since 2015 ===
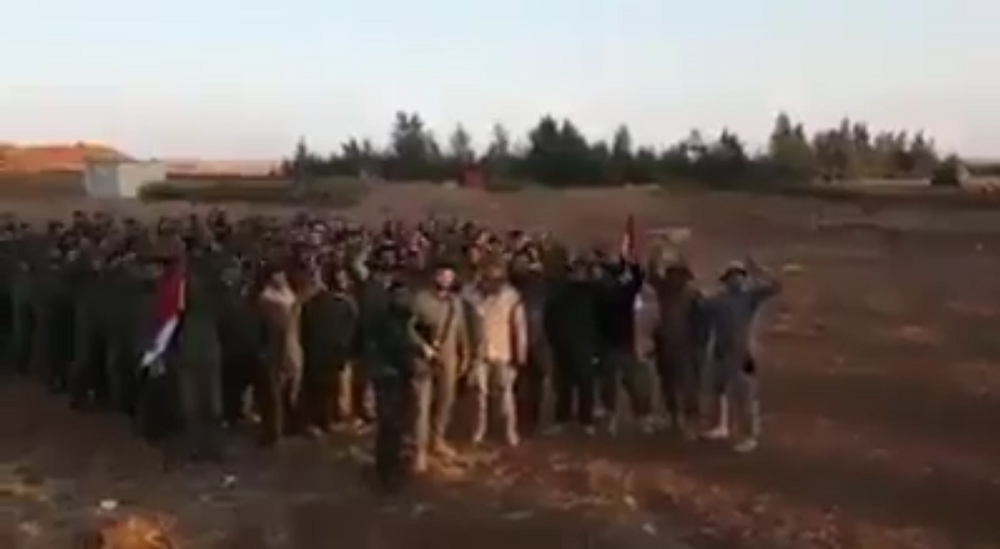
Baqir Brigade recruits from Deir ez-Zor Governorate in August 2018

While its foundation and early operations are not well documented, the Baqir Brigade's involvement in the fighting in and around Aleppo since 2015 is better known. The militia took part in a government offensive south of the city in late 2015, and helped lifting the Siege of Nubl and al-Zahraa during the Northern Aleppo offensive of February 2016. Alongside its Hezbollah and Iraqi allies, the Baqir Brigade also fought at Tel Al-Eis in course of the 2016 Southern Aleppo campaign. The militia also took part in the final military operations in the city. In course of the important Aleppo offensive (October–November 2016), the Baqir Brigade secured the New Aleppo Neighborhood against heavy attacks by rebels forces, among them troops of the Army of Conquest, and then fought in the offensive of November and December 2016 that resulted in the complete reconquest of the city by government forces.

The Baqir Brigade, alongside other Iranian-backed militias, spearheaded the Syrian Desert campaign (May–July 2017), and fought against U.S.-supported rebel troops in the region around al-Tanf. In February 2018, the Baqir Brigade and other pro-government forces directly clashed with the United States Armed Forces and the Syrian Democratic Forces (SDF) during the Battle of Khasham in Deir ez-Zor Governorate. Despite this, the Baqir Brigade sent volunteers to aid the SDF in Afrin Region when the latter was invaded by Turkey and the Turkish-backed Free Syrian Army during Operation Olive Branch. Declaring their support for Afrin's SDF defenders, the Baqir Brigade announced that it would lead local pro-government forces "against FSA terrorists and Turks". One analyst argued that the militia's intervention in Afrin intended to improve relations between pro-government factions (including Iran) and the Syrian Kurds who form the SDF's core.

On 6 April 2018, the Baqir Brigade declared jihad on U.S. and Turkish forces in Syria, vowing to "liberate every single inch of the precious homeland" from American and Turkish forces and to "defend the unity of the Syrian Arab Republic and the Islamic nation." Accordingly, it would start "resistance operations" against the U.S.-led coalition forces in Deir ez-Zor Governorate. The pro-opposition news site El-Dorar Al-Shamia claimed that the Baqir Brigade along with Hezbollah launched raid against the SDF in the western suburbs of Deir ez-Zor on 29 April 2018, though this was not independently verified. Around the same time, a Twitter account linked to the group posted the photo of a hill near Manbij, where U.S. troops are stationed, along with the threat "You are in our line of fire." In June 2018, the Baqir Brigade and other Syrian militias attended a conference in Eastern Aleppo Governorate, titled "Syrian tribes against foreign intervention and the American presence on Syrian soil". An expert of the Turkey-based think tank Omran Dirasat also argued that the Baqir Brigade had begun to train the Popular Resistance of the Eastern Region, a pro-government militant group that was taking part in the anti-SDF insurgency of eastern Syria.

According to pro-opposition media, the Baqir Brigade was among the military units that were mobilized to guard Aleppo's airports after Israeli airstrikes in March 2019. Two months later, Syrian news site Jorf News claimed that members of the Baqir Brigade were training naval combat in Latakia Governorate.

On 15 September 2019, the group threatened to attack the US-backed Syrian Democratic Forces in Deir ez-Zor, following the threats Syrian army and Liwa al-Quds reinforcements were sent to reportedly ease tensions between the Baqir Brigade and SDF. By early 2020, the Baqir Brigade was contributing troops to a government offensive in northwestern Syria. One of the militia's commanders, Juma al Ahmad, was killed during this operation. In late 2020, Iran organized a recruitment drive for the Baqir Brigade in the Deir ez-Zor Governorate. Around this time, the group dispatched troops to help combat the IS insurgency in the Syrian Desert. By 2023, the Baqir Brigade fought in a series of clashes in northwestern Syria.

=== Mutiny and defection in 2024 ===
In November 2024, the Syrian opposition launched large-scale offensives across northwestern Syria, triggering a general collapse of pro-government forces. A contingent of the Baqir Brigade was hastily sent from Deir ez-Zor to reinforce the failing defenses of Aleppo. When the killing of Iranian military advisor Kioumars Pourhashemi by a Syrian Army officer became known in Aleppo, this resulted in the mutiny or defection of numerous militias and formations, including the Baqir Brigade.

Baqir Brigade leader Khalid al-Hassan initially ordered his militia to remain neutral, and even advised the commander of another pro-government unit, the Martyr Ali Zayn al-'Abidin Berri Brigade, to also stand down during the fighting for Aleppo. To the shock of other loyalists, however, the Baqir Brigade eventually fully defected to the insurgents and joined them in clashes with the fleeing pro-Assad forces. One eyewitness later claimed that Khalid al-Hassan had been convinced to defect by his cousin, Zakur Abu Ahmad Bakari who was a leading insurgent commander. When the Assad regime completely collapsed in December 2024, Baqir Brigade-supported parliamentarian Omar al-Hassan publicly congratulated the Syrian rebels.

== Politics ==
=== Ideology and Shia proselytization ===
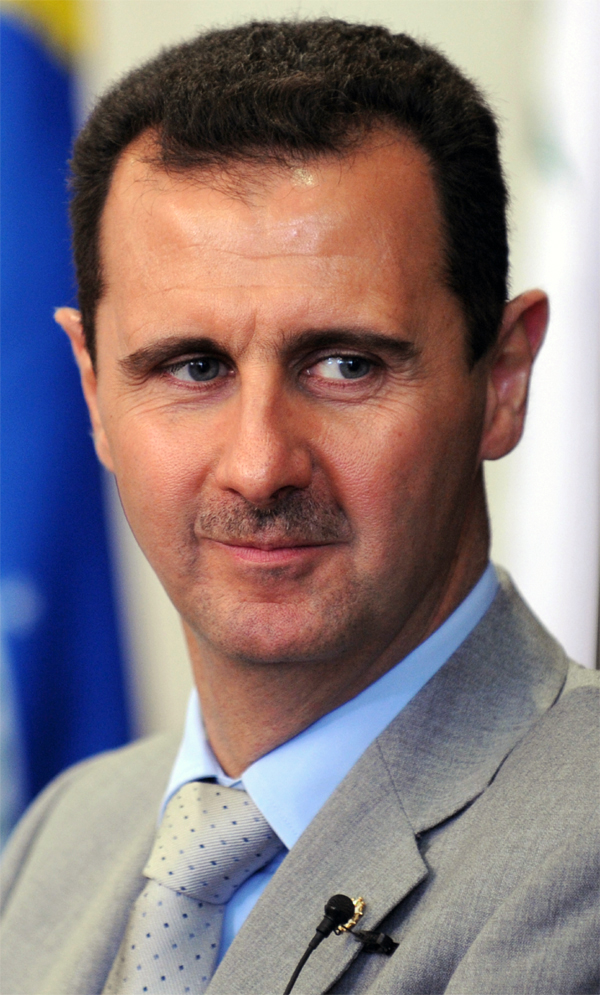
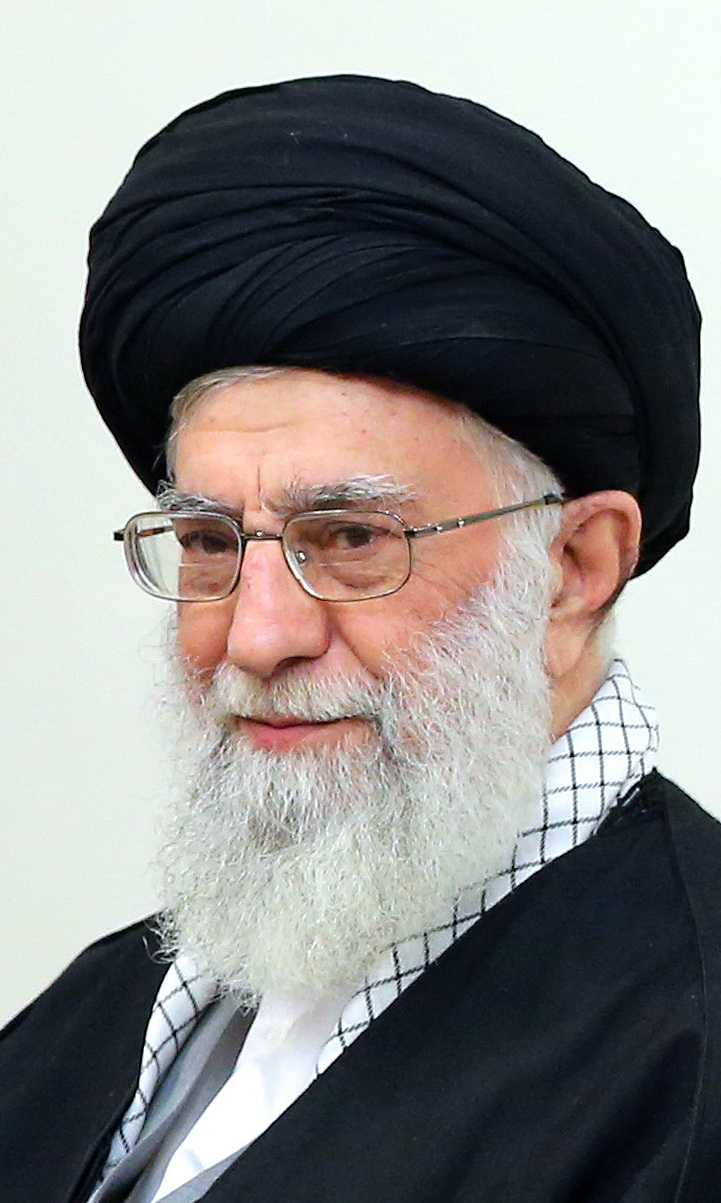
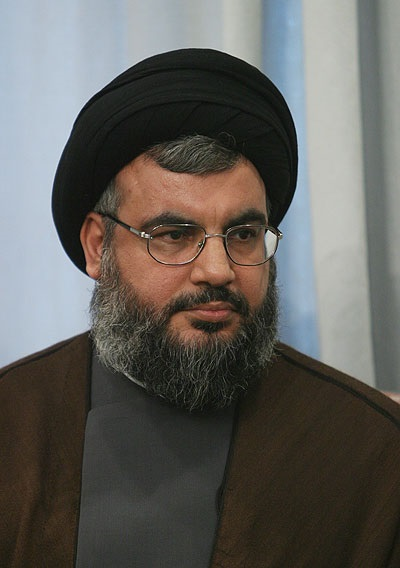
Images of Bashar al-Assad, Ali Khamenei, and Hassan Nasrallah were an important part of the Baqir Brigade's symbolism

The Baqir Brigade portrayed itself as Syrian nationalist force, "the first auxiliary [/reserve]" of the Syrian Army, and as part of the wider "Islamic Resistance" against Salafism and Zionism. It consequently often used the portraits of the Axis of Resistance's leaders Bashar al-Assad, Hassan Nasrallah, and Ali Khamenei, as well as imagery and language resembling that of Hezbollah (including its flag). As part of the "Islamic Resistance", the unit also referred to its fighters as mujahideen and prominently propagates those who have been killed in combat as martyrs.

Strongly connected to Iran, the Baqir Brigade was believed to be part of an Iranian attempt to not just spread its political influence in Syria but to also spread Shia Islam in the region. In consequence, the militia mostly recruited converts to Shia Islam drawn from Syrian tribes. Most of the group's fighters were tribesmen belonging to the al-Baggara who were the target of successful Iranian-backed proselytization efforts before the civil war, with up to 25% of the tribe converting. One reason for this success was the purported descent of the al-Baggara from Muhammad al-Baqir, the Shia Imam after whom the Baqir Brigade was named. The unit also had Sunni Muslim members.

Fighters of the Baqir Brigade were trained and thus influenced by the Islamic Revolutionary Guard Corps, Hezbollah, and Iraqi Shia militants. Khalid al-Hassan was also once photographed with Qasem Soleimani, commander of the Quds Force. The Baqir Brigade has also voiced support for the Yemeni Houthi movement, another group suspected being linked to Iran. These international connections have led some analysts to claim that the Baqir Brigade was controlled by Iran. Considering the militia's rapid mutiny and defection in 2024, Aymenn Jawad Al-Tamimi argued that "analysts and observers [had] over-estimated the ideological affinity of Liwa al-Baqir with the 'axis of resistance'".

=== Involvement in governance and civil affairs ===
Prior to the collapse of the Assad regime, the militia also took part in civil politics. It was connected to Omar Hussein al-Hassan, who has been described as "political leader" of the Baqir Brigade. The militia consequently supported him as independent candidate during the Syrian parliamentary elections of 2016 and of 2020. The militia also worked with the Syrian State Ministry for the Affairs of National Reconciliation, and consequently tried to mediate between rival factions in Aleppo. In one notable case, it helped to conciliate the influential Abu Ra's and Berri clans. In 2017, the militia also coordinated the reconciliation of Nawaf al-Bashir, a prominent al-Baggara tribal leader and former supporter of the Syrian opposition, with the government.

The group was known for distributing humanitarian aid in areas where it operated.

== See also ==
- List of armed groups in the Syrian Civil War
- Shabiha
- Sabireen Movement
