= Battle of Aleppo (2024) =

HTS-led military operation of the Syrian civil war

- Part of the Northwestern Syria offensive (2024) during the Syrian civil war
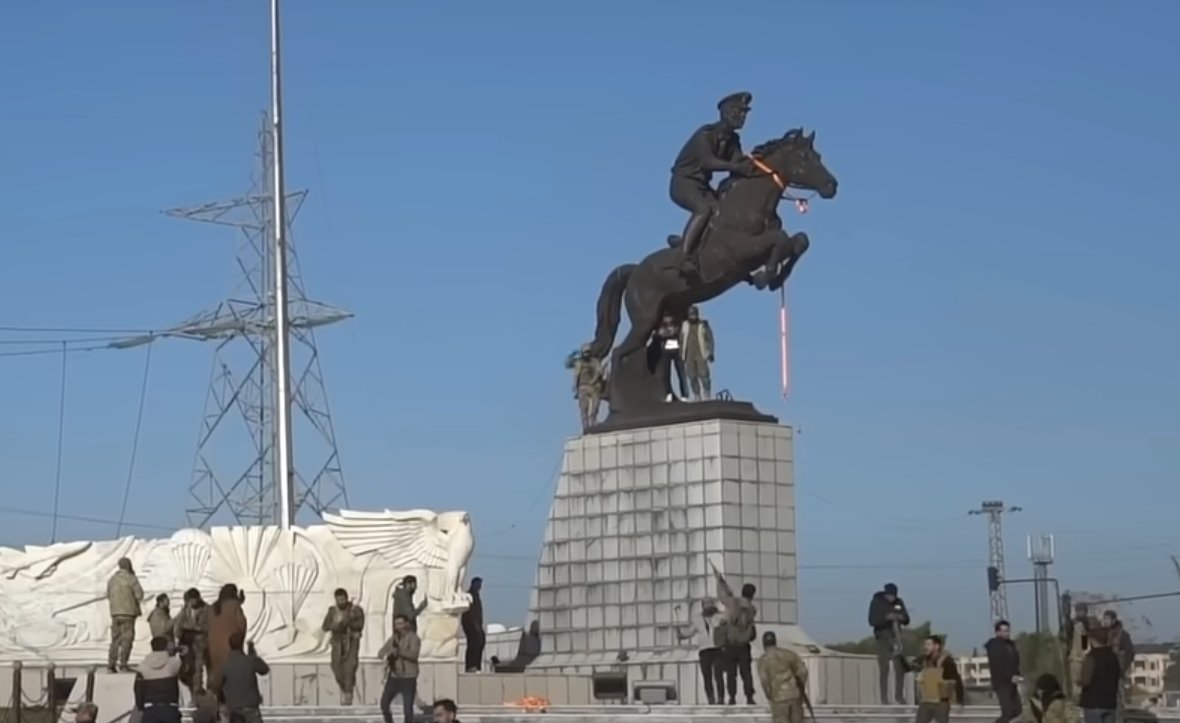
- Syrian opposition fighters toppling a statue of Bassel al-Assad in New Aleppo
Date	29 November – 2 December 2024 (3 days)
Location	Aleppo Governorate, Syria
Result	Syrian opposition victory; Syrian government forces retreat from the city; SDF enclave within the city besieged by rebels
Territorial changes	Syrian opposition forces capture most of the city; SDF retains control of Sheikh Maqsood and moves into adjacent districts

Belligerents
Syrian Opposition; Syrian Salvation Government; (Syrian opposition) Syrian Interim Government	Syrian Government; Russia; Iran Autonomous Administration of North and East Syria (Note: Since 30 November 2024)

Commanders and leaders
Abu Mohammad al-Julani; Murhaf Abu Qasra	Suhayl al-Hasan; Saleh al-Abdullah

Units involved
Military Operations Command; Hay'at Tahrir al-Sham; Red Bands; Thermal Brigades; Liwa al-Muhajireen wal-Ansar; Katibat al-Tawhid wal-Jihad; Mujahidin Ghuroba Division; Ajnad al-Kavkaz; (Syrian opposition) Syrian National Army	Syrian Armed Forces; Syrian Army; Regiment 46; 25th SMF Division; Republican Guard; Syrian Air Force; Local Defence Forces; Baqir Brigade (surrendered); Martyr Ali Zayn al-'Abidin Berri Brigade; Russian Armed Forces; Russian Aerospace Forces; Russian Air Force; Islamic Republic of Iran Armed Forces; Islamic Revolutionary Guard Corps; (Iraq) Iraqi militias; Syrian Democratic Forces; People's Defense Units; Women's Protection Units; Sheikh Maqsoud Liberation Forces; Ashrafieh Liberation Forces

Strength
350 militants (Russian claim)	(Syria) 30,000 troops (Russian claim)

Casualties and losses
Dozens of rebels killed	(Ba'athist Syria) Dozens of soldiers killed
- 22 civilians killed

The Battle of Aleppo (2024), also known as the Second Battle of Aleppo or the Fall of Aleppo began when the Syrian opposition group Hay'at Tahrir al-Sham, along with allied Turkish-backed groups in the Military Operations Command, entered the Syrian government-held city of Aleppo. The battle began on the third day of a large-scale rebel offensive. It was the first time fighting had broken out in the city since the earlier battle, which began in 2012 and ended in 2016 when the Assad administration pushed rebels out of the city.

On 30 November 2024, opposition groups captured most of the city amidst the collapse of pro-government forces. Coinciding with the lightning-speed takeover of Aleppo, the rebels pushed into the countryside of northern Hama; the whole city of Hama eventually fell to the rebels on 5 December.

== Background ==
After the battle from 2012 to 2016, Syrian government forces did not develop or increase the military defenses of the city even though rebel forces continued to operate to Aleppo's west. Instead, the pro-government groups engaged in corruption, and were thus not well prepared for major insurgent attacks.

On 27 November 2024, Syrian opposition groups led by Tahrir al-Sham launched an offensive against pro-government forces in Northwestern Syria. The offensive, the first of its kind by any side in the conflict since March 2020 Idlib ceasefire, resulted in the rapid capture of dozens of villages by the opposition forces. During the offensive, rebels reportedly seized 70 sites in the provinces of Aleppo and Idlib and about 10,000 civilians fled the fighting to the Idlib countryside, northwestern Syria.

== Opposing forces ==
The rebel assault on Aleppo city was spearheaded by Hay'at Tahrir al-Sham (HTS), but also included various other rebel factions. Among others, there were several Syrian National Army (SNA) units, alongside various Islamist militias and battalions made up of foreign volunteers taking part in the operation, including Ajnad al-Kavkaz, Liwa al-Muhajireen wal-Ansar, Mujahidin Ghuroba Division and Katibat al-Tawhid wal-Jihad. The insurgent forces, especially HTS, were well-organized, relatively well-equipped, and highly motivated. The rebels had also sent sleeper cells to infiltrate Aleppo city.

In contrast to the rebels, pro-government forces in Aleppo suffered from poor organization, extensive corruption, and poor morale. Regular Syrian Army units lacked supplies, were regarded as unreliable, and included many "ghost soldiers" in their ranks. One Syrian Army colonel later argued that the Aleppo-based troops had previously relied on Hezbollah and Iranian officers for operational command, but these had been largely withdrawn from Syria at the time of the opposition offensive. Among the remaining Aleppo-based garrison were Iraqi militias and some Iranian advisers. Despite this, relations between the Syrian leadership and its foreign allies had gradually suffered over the previous year, resulting in growing conflicts. On 28 November, a meeting of high-ranking officers in Aleppo was organized by Mohammad Salman Saftli, a Syrian Republican Guard officer who had been tasked with countering the rebel attacks. However, the meeting devolved into violence, as Islamic Revolutionary Guard Corps general Kioumars Pourhashemi was killed by a Syrian Army officer. Officially, the incident was initially attributed to an alleged rebel attack, but the truth of Pourhashemi's death soon spread among Aleppo's garrison. The incident impacted the local loyalist leadership and further demotivated Aleppo's defenders, reducing the willingness of the foreign allies to fight for Syria and increasing the willingness of Syrian troops to mutiny or defect.

== Battle ==
=== Fall of Aleppo ===
Syrian opposition tanks in or near Aleppo, 29 November 2024

On 29 November 2024, rebel forces approached the outskirts of Aleppo. They took Khalsa, Al-Rashidin and Khan Tuman, where the army abandoned four T-55 tanks. The Syrian government was overwhelmed by the rebel offensive's speed, and could not organize a coordinated defense of Aleppo. The defending units were not provided with a coherent plan, instead being "told to work it out for themselves". Researchers Hassan Hassan and Michael Weiss argued that the pro-government forces "suffered a complete breakdown in command and control and morale". The main Syrian Army unit on the insurgents' path, Regiment 46, "simply collapsed". As the insurgents attacked, they initially bypassed heavily fortified strongholds like the Military Academy and Artillery College in favor of a speedy advance deep into Aleppo.

Some pro-government military formations, including the 25th Special Mission Forces Division and Republican Guard forces, were hastily sent to reinforce the city, and took up position at several strategic locations such as the Citadel of Aleppo. Other pro-government units withdrew southward, such as Harakat Hezbollah al-Nujaba and the Local Defence Forces' Martyr Ali Zayn al-'Abidin Berri Brigade. Witnessing the collapse of the Syrian loyalist forces, the local Hezbollah contingents also opted to retreat. The loyalists were also shocked when the Baqir Brigade, deemed one of the most reliable local units, mutinied and partially defected to the rebels. Baqir Brigade commander Khalid al-Hassan had reportedly been convinced to change sides by his cousin Zakur Abu Ahmad Bakari who was one of the leading rebel commanders. As the 25th Special Mission Forces Division under Maj. Gen. Suheil al-Hassan and Maj. Gen. Saleh al-Abdullah arrived in greater numbers at the outskirts of Aleppo, this initially resulted in a short-lived upsurge of morale among Aleppo's defenders. However, the 25th Division also refused to organized a large-scale counter-attack, with Suheil al-Hassan reportedly "quarrelled" with the fleeing troops, telling them to keep retreating to Damascus. The 25th Division took up position at the al-Nayrab airbase. North of Aleppo, local militias initially managed to hold the towns of Nubl and al-Zahraa.

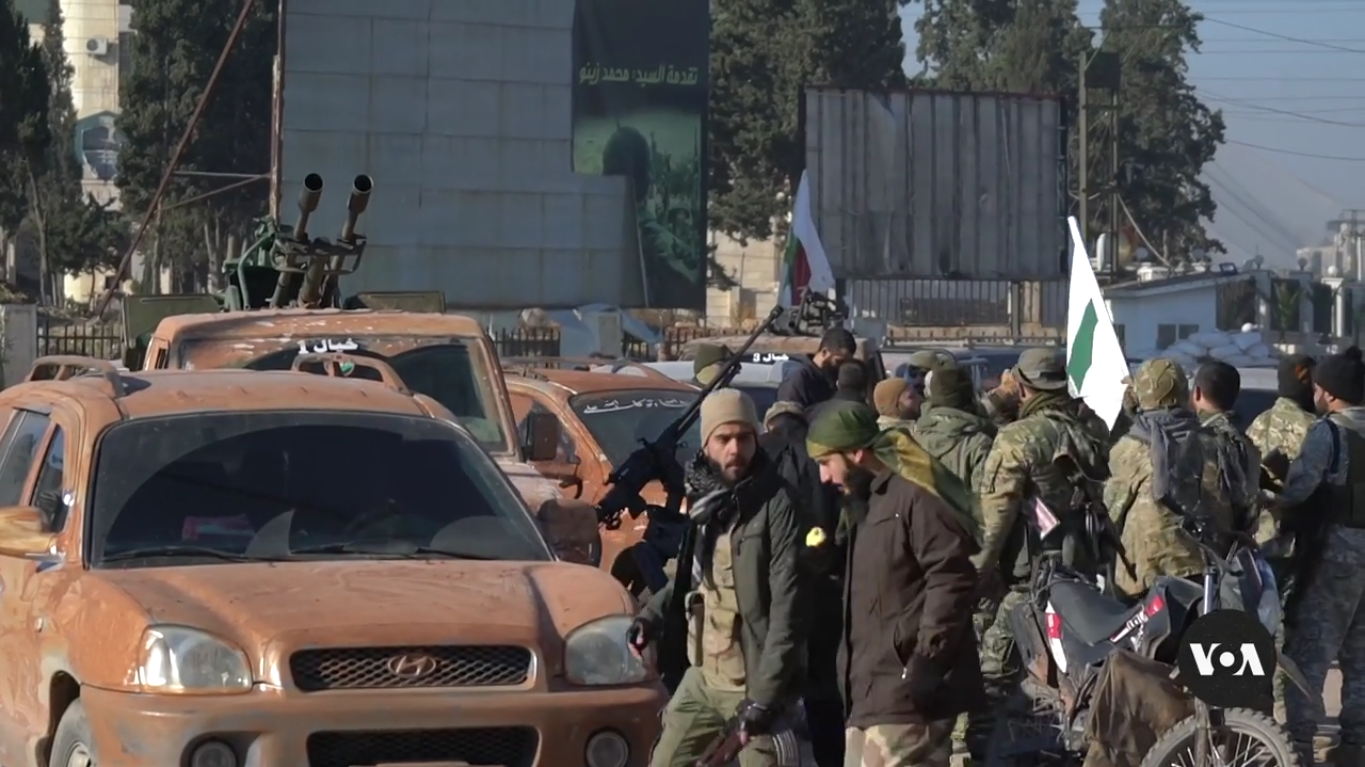
Rebels inside Aleppo

During the afternoon, rebels entered the Hamdaniyah and New Aleppo neighborhoods in the city, after carrying out a double suicide bombing with two car bombs, according to the war monitor Syrian Observatory for Human Rights (SOHR). In the latter half of the day, opposition forces captured five city districts, Al-Hamdaniya, New Aleppo, 3000 Apartments, Al-Jamiliya, and Salah al-Din districts. Clashes were reported elsewhere in the city, including its center. By midnight, opposition forces had captured parts of Al-Sukariyya, Al-Furqan, Al-Adhamiya, and Saif al-Dawla districts, and claimed to have had taken control of the main square of Aleppo. Around this time, the rebels also approached the Neirab Palestinian refugee camp where the local loyalist garrison consisting of Liwa al-Quds troops retreated without organizing resistance.

Hours after the rebel incursion into the main neighbourhoods, thousands of civilians fled the city through the main Khanasir Athriya intersection with most heading to Latakia and Salamiya. The rebel forces issued evacuation warnings calling on residents of Aleppo to move eastwards "for your safety". Syrian state media reported that projectiles launched by the rebels hit student housing in the University of Aleppo, killing four people, including two students. The SOHR also reported on the incident, saying two others were wounded by rebel rockets.

In the early hours of 30 November 2024, rebel forces captured the Citadel of Aleppo and the government headquarters in the city, as well as "more than half" of the city. By morning, rebel forces had seized control of most of Aleppo, facing little resistance and forcing pro-government troops to retreat toward as-Safirah. Government forces and Iranian militias initially remained in control of a few neighborhoods in northeastern Aleppo, but the remaining loyalist troops -including the 25th Division at al-Nayrab airbase- organized no further substantial resistance, instead joining the general retreat southward. Russian forces abandoned at least three military bases around the city. As the Aleppo garrison withdrew, other loyalist militias in the region followed them, including the holdouts of Nubl and al-Zahraa.

=== Clashes between Syrian rebels and SDF ===
The Kurdish-led Syrian Democratic Forces occupied Aleppo International Airport and the Shaykh Najjar district, following the withdrawal of pro-government forces. Incursion into the Kurdish-held neighborhood of Sheikh Maqsoud was thwarted and 3 rebels were taken prisoners. In the evening, rebels took control of Aleppo airport from the SDF without clashes. An airstrike, reportedly carried out by Russian aircraft, killed 16 civilians and injured 20 others in the city. Two other airstrikes on rebel reinforcements on the outskirts of the city left 20 fighters dead.

The Autonomous Administration of North and East Syria (AANES) reportedly facilitated the entry of 2,892 refugees from Aleppo into Northeastern Syria.

On 1 December 2024, HTS captured the thermal power station, Artillery College, and the Military Academy on the outskirts of the city. Meanwhile, clashes occurred between SNA and SDF in the Sheikh Najjar industrial district. Concurrently, the SDF closed the road linking areas in the northern Aleppo countryside and the city center of Aleppo.

Later that day, in response to the swift rebel gains in Aleppo and Tell Rifaat, the AANES declared a state of general mobilization. The rebels issued a demand for Kurdish forces in Aleppo to leave with their weapons for the northeast.

Also on 1 December, the Russian Air Force conducted an airstrike on the Aleppo University Hospital, killing 12 people, eight of whom were civilians, and injuring two journalists.

On 2 December 2024, rebels captured the Sheikh Najjar industrial zone from the SDF and pushed further south of Aleppo, capturing Khansir in an attempt to cut off the army's main supply route to Aleppo city.

== Aftermath ==
The Kurdish enclave inside the city, namely the neighbourhoods of Sheikh Maqsoud and Ashrafieh, were besieged by the rebels, with the approximately 100,000 residents facing "dwindling food supplies and a lack of services". However, no significant mass displacement was reported as of date. The rebels renewed their offer for armed fighters to leave the city and guaranteed their safety, but asked the civilians to stay.

In the days after the battle, while the Syrian Salvation Government was trying to establish itself in the city, Aleppo residents were facing shortages of bread and fuel, and cut telecom services.

Coinciding with the lightning-speed takeover of Aleppo, the rebels pushed into the countryside of northern Hama. This city was the main destination of many loyalist units which had retreated from Aleppo, though several of these mutinied, defected or disintegrated on the way. The remnants rallied under Maj.-Gen. al-Hasan and actually put up a substantial resistance at Hama, though it was also soon overcome by the insurgents. The city of Hama eventually fell to the rebels on 5 December.

== Reactions ==
- Ba'athist Syria: The Syrian Arab Armed Forces (SAAF) acknowledged the rebel takeover of the city, which forced it to redeploy "aimed at strengthening the defence lines in order to absorb the attack" and "preserve the lives of civilians and soldiers". It was also reportedly preparing to counter-attack, while rebel gatherings within the city were targeted by airstrikes.
- Turkey: Foreign minister Hakan Fidan reiterated that Turkey is not involved in the ongoing conflicts in Aleppo. He also stated that his government is taking the "necessary measures" to avoid another migration crisis at its border.
