= Kioumars Pourhashemi =

Iranian brigadier general (died 2024)

- كيومرث بور هاشمي
- Died: 28 November 2024; Aleppo, Syria
- Military career
- Allegiance: Iran
- Branch: IRGC
- Rank: Second brigadier general
- Commands: Quds Force
- Conflicts: Iran–Iraq War; Syrian Civil War; 2024 Syrian opposition offensives †

Kioumars Pourhashemi (Persian: کیومرث پورهاشمی; died 28 November 2024), also known by his nom de guerre Haji Hashem, was an Iranian military officer in the Islamic Revolutionary Guard Corps (IRGC). He served as an IRGC military advisor to the Syrian Arab Army during the Syrian civil war, and was killed in action shortly before the Battle of Aleppo of 2024.

== History ==
Pourhashemi was an Iranian IRGC military officer who had served in the Iran–Iraq War of the 1980s. By 2024, he had become an officer in the IRGC's special force for external operations, the Quds Force and was serving as an Iranian military advisor to Syria. At the time, he was reportedly the leading Iranian advisor in the country.

As a result of his importance, Pourhashemi attended a high-level meeting of pro-government commanders on 28 November 2024 when the Syrian opposition initiated large-scale offensives across northwestern Syria. The meeting rapidly deteriorated when Pourhashemi questioned the loyalty of a number of Syrian Arab Army officers after they complained about the poor state of their units. According to eyewitnesses and CGTN, the dispute ultimately escalated into violence when one Syrian officer shot an AKM at Pourhashemi and a Hezbollah commander, killing the former and wounding the latter. Those present knew that this killing would be disruptive for the pro-government forces' morale, and thus initial reports were spread to attribute Pourhashemi's death to Tahrir al-Sham militants. The IRGC-affiliated Tasnim News Agency just said he was killed by "Takfiri terrorists."

However, the truth about Pourhashemi's killer quickly spread among Aleppo's garrison. Researchers Hassan Hassan and Michael Weiss argued that Pourhashemi's death — along with a number of other senior officers — greatly contributed to the collapse of the loyalist defenses of Aleppo. His demise reportedly encouraged several more mutinies among Syrian Arab Army troops and loyalist militias. Most notably, the Baqir Brigade's troops stood aside and outright defected to the rebels.
