= Semyon Bagdasarov =

Russian politician

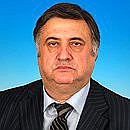
Semyon Bagdasarov

Semyon Arkadyevich Bagdasarov (Russian: Семён Арка́дьевич Багдаса́ров; born November 20, 1954, in Margilan, Uzbek SSR) is a Russian politician and member of the State Duma of the Russian Federation. He is a member of A Just Russia.

He has studied at the Military Institute of the Red Star and has learnt Dari. As a political analyst, he concentrates on Central Asian and Middle Eastern affairs.

In October 2015, amidst the Russian intervention in Syria, Bagdasarov, argued that the historical tradition of Eastern Orthodoxy in Syria made it a “holy land” for Russians and “their” land. Hence he stated that there was “no Orthodoxy or Russia without Syria”.

He is an ethnic Armenian.
