= Mujahidin Ghuroba Division =

Syrian-based militant jihadist group

- Arabic: كتيبة الغرباء التركستانية; Uyghur:كاتىبات تۈركستان
- Dates active: July 2017 — 2025
- Allegiance: Hay'at Tahrir al-Sham (until 2025)
- Ideology: Jihadism; Anti-communism
- Wars: Syrian Civil War: 2024 Syrian opposition offensives; Battle of Aleppo (2024)

The Mujahidin Ghuroba Division, formerly known as Katibat al-Ghuraba al-Turkistan (Arabic: كتيبة الغرباء التركستانية Uyghur: كاتىبات تۈركستان), was a predominantly Uyghur militant jihadist group based in Syria. It is likely that some members have become part of the Syrian Army's new 84th Division.

== History ==
=== Syrian civil war ===
The group established itself in July 2017, in north-western Syria, mostly by advertising itself through YouTube propaganda videos of battle against Syrian Forces. Though unaffiliated, it has, through its YouTube videos, normally shown support to Al-Qaeda and the Al-Nusra Front. Throughout its history, it has openly shown its hatred for China and the CCP, especially the government's treatment of Uyghurs.

In March 2018, the group expanded throughout Idlib and Hama governorate, with help from Hay'at Tahrir al-Sham.

In October 2018, Katibat al-Ghuraba al-Turkistan trained with Malhama Tactical in Latakia, Syria, and uploaded a video of them doing so.

In August 2021, the group expanded throughout Syria and started occupying territory including the areas of Qalb Lawze and Jabal al-Sammaq.

The group was involved in the Battle of Aleppo in late November 2024 under its new name, the Mujahidin Ghuroba Division.

=== Syrian transitional government ===
Following the fall of the Assad regime, the formation of the Syrian transitional government, and the integration of foreign jihadist fighters into the 84th Division, it is likely that members of the Mujahidin Ghuroba Division were also incorporated into the division, according to the FDD's Long War Journal.
