= Sheikh Maqsoud Liberation Forces =

Militant organization in Sheikh Maqsoud

- قوات تحرير الشيخ مقصود
- Dates active: 30 November 2024–5 April 2025 (5 months, 6 days)
- Country: Syria
- Allegiance: Syrian Democratic Forces
- Headquarters: Sheikh Maqsoud
- Ideology: Kurdish nationalism
- Wars: Syrian civil war; 2024 Syrian opposition offensives; Battle of Aleppo (2024); Operation Dawn of Freedom

The Sheikh Maqsoud Liberation Forces (Arabic: قوات تحرير الشيخ مقصود, romanized: quaat tahrir alshaykh maqsud) was a militant organization in Sheikh Maqsoud, a Kurdish-majority neighborhood of the city of Aleppo, Syria.

== History ==
Following the 2024 Syrian opposition offensives in Aleppo, the Syrian Democratic Forces and Women's Protection Units intervened in the Sheikh Maqsoud and Ashrafieh neighborhoods, creating their respective liberation forces and thwarting the Turkish "Operation Dawn of Freedom" attacks, following the occupation of the Tell Rifaat, Sheikh Maqsoud and Maskanah corridor.

After the fall of Aleppo in 2024, they were surrounded and besieged until 4 April 2025, when the Syrian Democratic Forces signed an agreement with the Syrian transitional government, passing Sheikh Maqsoud into the hands of the local Asayish Interior Security Force, and disbanding the liberation forces and other militias.
