= Mubarakat =

Mubarakat المباركات
- Village
- Location in Syria
- Coordinates: 35°7′19″N 36°51′44″E
- Country: Syria
- Governorate: Hama
- District: Hama
- Subdistrict: Hama

Population (2004)
  - Total: 478
- Time zone: UTC+3 (AST)
- City Qrya Pcode: C2958

Mubarakat (Arabic: المباركات) is a village in central Syria, administratively part of the Hama Governorate. According to the Syria Central Bureau of Statistics (CBS), Mubarakat had a population of 478 in the 2005 census. Its inhabitants are Sunni Muslims.

== History ==
In the late 19th or early 20th century, Mubarakat was sold by the Ma'an family, which was part of a local Bedouin tribe, to the Barazi and Kaylani families, prominent landowners based in the city of Hama. Its inhabitants were Sunni Muslim Arab tenant farmers.

== Bibliography ==
- Comité de l'Asie française (April 1933). "Notes sur la propriété foncière dans le Syrie centrale (Notes on Landownership in Central Syria)". Bulletin du Comité de l'Asie française (in French). 33 (309). Comité de l'Asie française: 130–136.
