= Jabal Zayn al-Abidin =

Mountain in Syria

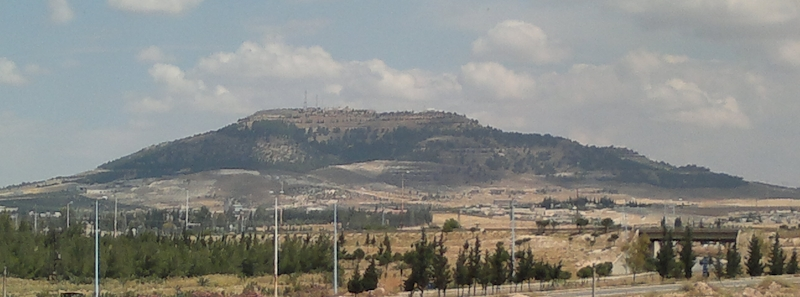
- Jabal Zayn al-Abidin

Highest point
- Elevation: 620 m (2,030 ft)
- Coordinates: 35°12′11″N 36°45′59″E

Naming
- English translation: جبل زين العابدين
- Language of name: ar

Geography
- Location within Syria
- Location: Hama Governorate, Syria

Jabal Zayn al-Abidin is a mountain east of the town of Qamhana and north of Hama in Syria. It has an elevation of 620 meters and is located near Jabal Kafraa. It is the 31st highest mountain in the Hama Governorate and the 544th highest in Syria.

== Religious significance ==
The mountain is named after the shrine of Ali Zayn al-Abidin, the son of Husayn ibn Ali. The shrine was built to commemorate the death of Zayn al-Abidin. It is a relatively minor site of visitation by Shia Muslims, including visiting Iranian pilgrims. It is also venerated by some members of Syria's Ismaili community, being one of the few shrines Ismailis venerate after the ban on shrine visitation in the 20th century by Ismaili religious authorities. The shrine was also historically venerated by the local Alawites.

== Bibliography ==
- Comité de l'Asie française (April 1933). "Notes sur la propriété foncière dans le Syrie centrale (Notes on Landownership in Central Syria)". Bulletin du Comité de l'Asie française (in French). 33 (309). Comité de l'Asie française: 131–133.
- Douwes, Dick (2011). "Modern History of the Nizari Ismailis of Syria". In Farhad, Daftary (ed.). A Modern History of the Ismailis: Continuity and Change in a Muslim Community. I. B. Tauris. ISBN 9781845117177.
- von Maltzahn, Nadia (2013). The Syria-Iran Axis: Cultural Diplomacy and International Relations in the Middle East. I.B. Tauris. ISBN 9781780765372.
