= Maar Shuhur =

Maar Shuhur معر شحور
- Village
- Location in Syria
- Coordinates: 35°12′24″N 36°50′56″E
- Country: Syria
- Governorate: Hama
- District: Hama
- Subdistrict: Hama

Population (2004)
  - Total: 5,595
- Time zone: UTC+3 (AST)
- City Qrya Pcode: C3003

Maar Shuhur (Arabic: معر شحور) is a Syrian village located in the Hama Subdistrict of the Hama District in Hama Governorate. According to the Syria Central Bureau of Statistics (CBS), Maar Shuhur had a population of 5,595 in the 2004 census. It's inhabitants are predominantly Sunni Muslims.

Most of the population work in agriculture, growing cumin, lentils and grains.

== History ==
In 1526, Maar Shuhur had a population of 10 households, increasing in size by 1551 to 20 households and 10 bachelors (who were often counted separately in Ottoman records for tax purposes). The village had no recorded population by 1594.

During the Syrian Civil War, Maar Shuhur was often regarded as a village loyal to the Assad regime despite being majority Sunni.
