= Bawabiyah =

Bawabiya بوابية
- Village
- Location in Syria
- Coordinates: 36°1′N 36°53′E
- Country: Syria
- Governorate: Aleppo Governorate
- District: Mount Simeon District
- Nahiyah: Al-Zurbah
- Elevation: 367 m (1,204 ft)

Population (2004 census)
  - Total: 2,790
- Time zone: UTC+2 (EET)
  - Summer (DST): UTC+3 (EEST)

Bawabiya (Arabic: بوابية) is a village about 35 kilometers (22 mi) from Aleppo, Syria, and about 1.5 kilometers (0.93 mi) off the road to Damascus.
