= Corruption in Ba'athist Syria =

Corruption in Ba'athist Syria was pervasive and systemic, and was characterized by corruption patterns of one-party states, wherein Ba'ath party officials and Assad family loyalists extensively abused their political powers for private and sectarian gains in the country of Syria.

Several researchers and journalists have identified the pervasive corruption in the Syrian Arab Armed Forces and allied Ba'athist militias as one of the major reasons for the rapid collapse of the Assad regime during the Syrian revolutionary offensives in 2024.

== Background ==
The pervasive nature of corruption in Ba'athist Syria was attributed to the rampant nepotism and favoritism, which created the systemic abuse of power and the misuse of public funds by members of the Ba'ath Party. This practice was institutionalized by the Article 8 of the 1973 Syrian constitution, which declared the Ba'ath Party as the only ruling party. The regime's sole access and control over public resources allowed public officials to divert funds for personal gain. Nepotism became so embedded in the government that a term, Siyasat al-Hajji (Old Man's Policy), was coined to describe the culture.

Ba'ath's own organizational report released in 1985 had already talked about corruption. It highlighted the influx of individuals into the party whose primary aim was "to attain leading positions, in order to realise moral and material gains" and "seize opportunities to make illegitimate profits". As a result of the failure to address the issue, corruption became deeply entrenched, infiltrating every level of society.

== Transnational drug trade ==
Syria was labeled as a narco-state by the United States for nearly a decade until 1997, during the Syrian occupation of Lebanon when they controlled the cannabis cultivation in the Beqaa Valley in Lebanon, and were the Middle East region's main source of hashish. During the Syrian Civil War, mass production of drugs within Syria began, and officers fed their men fenethylline, which they called "Captain Courage." Several shipments containing tonnes of amphetamines were seized in different countries smuggled from Syria, those shipments had sometimes millions of pills of fenethylline, which production in the country started since at least 2006. In November 2020, two drug shipments of hashish coming from Syria were seized by Egyptian authorities, the first shipment which arrived to Alexandria, included 2 tonnes of hashish, while the second shipment had 6 tonnes and was found at the Damietta port. The port of Latakia became under scrutiny of European and American police, as being favored by smugglers. In May 2021, Turkish security forces used UAVs to stop 1.5 tonnes of marijuana being smuggled out of Syria. According to the Centre for Operational Analysis and Research (COAR), Syrian seized drugs in 2020 had the value of no less than $3.4bn.

The New York Times reported in December 2021 that the 4th Armoured Division, commanded by Maher al-Assad, oversaw much of the production and distribution of Captagon, among other drugs, reinforcing Syria's status as a narco-state on the Mediterranean sea. The unit controlled manufacturing facilities, packing plants, and smuggling networks all across Syria (which also moved crystal meth). The division's security bureau, headed by Maj. Gen. Ghassan Bilal, provided protection for factories and along smuggling routes to the port city Latakia and to border crossings with Jordan and Lebanon.

== Indicators of corruption ==
Transparency International's annual Corruption Perceptions Index surveys corruption experts about their perception of corruption in many countries of the world. Transparency International scores those countries on a scale from 0 ("highly corrupt") to 100 ("very clean") and then ranks them by score. The country ranked first is perceived to have the most honest public sector. The current version of the Index was introduced in 2012.

=== Bashar al-Assad regime ===
In the 2012 Index, Syria scored 26. Syria's score then fell over the next few years to 13 in 2016. It varied between 13 and 14 until the 2024 Index was published in early 2025, immediately after the fall of the Assad regime. In the 2024 Index, Syria scored 12. When ranked by score, Syria ranked 177th among the 180 countries in the Index that year. For comparison with regional scores, the average score among Middle Eastern and North African countries (Note: Algeria, Bahrain, Egypt, Iran, Iraq, Israel, Jordan, Kuwait, Lebanon, Libya, Morocco, Oman, Qatar, Saudi Arabia, Syria, Tunisia, United Arab Emirates, and Yemen) was 39. The best score among Middle Eastern and North African countries was 68 and the worst score was Syria's, 12. For comparison with worldwide scores, the average score was 43, the best score was 90 (ranked 1), and the worst score was 8 (ranked 180).

=== Post-Ba'athist Syria ===
In the 2025 Index, the first which evaluates post-Ba'athist Syria, Syria scored 15. When ranked by score, Syria ranked 172nd among the 182 countries in the Index. For comparison with regional scores, the best score among Middle Eastern and North African countries was 69, the average was 39 and the worst was 13. For comparison with worldwide scores, the best score was 89 (ranked 1), the average was 42, and the worst was 9 (ranked 181 in a two-way tie).

Discussing the 2025 Index, Transparency International grouped Syria among countries which "remain in a state of uncertainty related to recent or ongoing conflicts. This has played an important role in their respective governments’ commitment to anti-corruption efforts, where political rivalries, lack of human resources and infrastructure, as well as internal tensions means that good governance is not prioritised."
