= New Aleppo =

New Aleppo حلب الجديدة Halab al-Jadidah
- Neighborhood
- Location within Aleppo
- Coordinates: 36°11′58.8″N 37°06′25.2″E
- Country: Syria
- City: Aleppo
- Highest elevation: 472 m (1,549 ft)
- Lowest elevation: 421 m (1,381 ft)

Population (2004 census)
  - Total: 67,247
- Time zone: UTC+3 (EET)
- Climate: BSk

New Aleppo (Arabic: حيّ حلب الجديدة, romanized: Ḥayy Ḥalab al-Jadīda) is one of the largest neighborhoods in Aleppo in Syria. Its residential area has Aleppo's classical buildings, which were built with white stones. New Aleppo is an extension of the city to the west. It is surrounded by Al-Zahraa neighbourhood (North), Al-Furqan neighbourhood (East), Al-Hamdaniyah neighbourhood (South), and Al-Rashideen town (West)

== Etymology ==
It was called New Aleppo because it is the latest -at the time- neighborhood that was built in the city, and its buildings have a lot of differences from those in other neighborhoods. Aleppo's name is maybe from Syriac means: "white city" because it has white stones and its buildings were constructed with stones.

== History ==
Construction of the neighborhood began in the 1980s, but it was not a real suburb because the first buildings were outside the city. In 2000 the state began building an orderly neighborhood. It is now one of the largest neighborhoods in the city, and until nowadays it is expanding such as Menyan "Benyameen" quarter (Menyan was previously a small town that got absorbed by the city).

=== 2024 capture by HTS ===
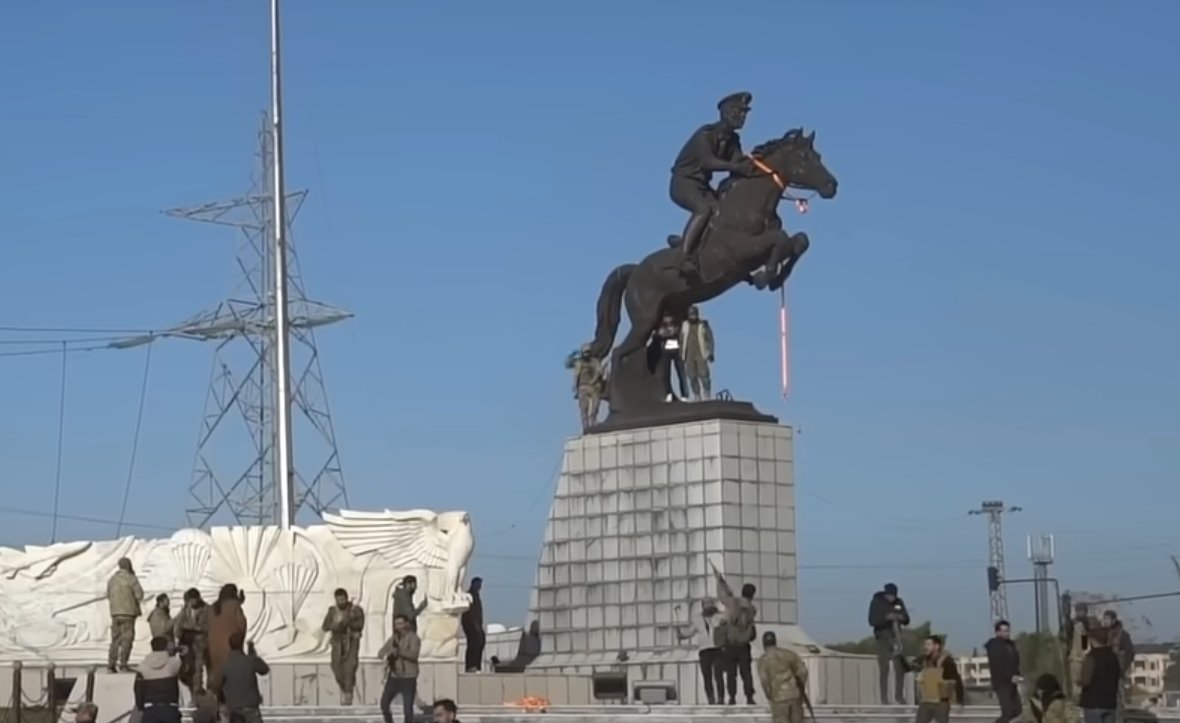
Syrian rebels toppling an equestrian statue of Bassel al-Assad in New Aleppo, which came to symbolize the fall of the Assad regime

On 29 November 2024, HTS rebels captured the neighborhood from the Syrian Army. And would topple the statue of Bassel al-Assad, the deceased brother of former Syrian president Bashar al-Assad.

== Geography and climate ==
The neighborhood is on a plateau in the west of the city at an elevation between 400 and 460 meters.

It has Mediterranean climate and 80% of precipitation occurs between October and March.

Climate data for New Aleppo Neighborhood
| Month | Jan | Feb | Mar | Apr | May | Jun | Jul | Aug | Sep | Oct | Nov | Dec | Year |
|---|---|---|---|---|---|---|---|---|---|---|---|---|---|
| Mean daily maximum °C (°F) | 8.9 (48.0) | 11.0 (51.8) | 15.3 (59.5) | 20.7 (69.3) | 26.5 (79.7) | 31.4 (88.5) | 33.5 (92.3) | 34.0 (93.2) | 31.2 (88.2) | 25.5 (77.9) | 17.5 (63.5) | 10.9 (51.6) | 22.2 (72.0) |
| Daily mean °C (°F) | 5.1 (41.2) | 6.4 (43.5) | 9.9 (49.8) | 14.5 (58.1) | 19.5 (67.1) | 24.2 (75.6) | 26.6 (79.9) | 27.0 (80.6) | 24.1 (75.4) | 18.7 (65.7) | 12.0 (53.6) | 6.9 (44.4) | 16.2 (61.2) |
| Mean daily minimum °C (°F) | 1.2 (34.2) | 1.8 (35.2) | 4.5 (40.1) | 8.3 (46.9) | 12.4 (54.3) | 17.0 (62.6) | 19.7 (67.5) | 20.0 (68.0) | 17.0 (62.6) | 11.9 (53.4) | 6.4 (43.5) | 2.8 (37.0) | 10.3 (50.4) |
| Average precipitation mm (inches) | 92 (3.6) | 84 (3.3) | 64 (2.5) | 45 (1.8) | 23 (0.9) | 4 (0.2) | 0 (0) | 1 (0.0) | 4 (0.2) | 27 (1.1) | 45 (1.8) | 91 (3.6) | 480 (19) |
| Average rainy days | 14 | 13 | 10 | 7 | 4 | 1 | 0 | 0 | 1 | 4 | 7 | 13 | 74 |
| Average snowy days | 1.2 | 0.3 | 0 | 0 | 0 | 0 | 0 | 0 | 0 | 0 | 0 | 0.5 | 2 |
| Mean monthly sunshine hours | 115.9 | 135.0 | 193.4 | 238.0 | 324.3 | 371.0 | 392.5 | 370.8 | 297.0 | 239.9 | 181.0 | 122.1 | 2,980.9 |
Source: WeatherBase, Climate-data.org, retrieved 10 November 2012

== Subdivisions ==
New Aleppo consists of North New Aleppo and the more recently built South New Aleppo. Both parts have several quarters. Two other neighborhoods that are sometimes considered part of New Aleppo are Al-Zahraa neighborhood and Al-Furqan neighborhood.

North New Aleppo contains:

- Muhandeseen quarter
- Al-Kahraba quarter
- Masaken Al-Ta'leem Al-'Alee quarter

South New Aleppo contains:

- Al-Bouhouth Al-'elmiyah quarter
- Masaken Al-Tamween quarter
- Al-Shuhadaa quarter
- Tawaso Al-Madinah quarter
- Al-Beaa' quarter
- Menyan "Benyamin" quarter

== Demographic ==
=== Religions ===
From the first construction in the neighborhood until now, most of its people have been Muslims, with some Christian families.

==== Mosques ====
There are a number of huge mosques, such as:

- Shaikh Omar Al-Halaby Mosque
- Al-Rahmah Mosque
- Al-Iman Mosque
- Abdullah bin Abbas Mosque
- Sa'ed bin Rabbie' Mosque
- Al-Ghufran Mosque

=== Languages ===
The people in New Aleppo speak Syrian Arabic in Aleppine tone, which has a big difference from Arabic. Also Kurds can speak Kurdish language as well as Arabic, French and English is a second foreign language as well as Arabic, but some can speak Turkish and German.

== Services ==
=== Schools ===
There are a number of secondary and primary schools for girls and boys.

==== Primary schools ====
- Haroun Al-Rasheed School
- Qoutaiba bin Muslim Al-bahili School
- Othman bin Affan School
- Hussain Tabra School
- Ahmad Aswad School
- Al-Moutanabbi School

==== Secondary schools ====
- Mousa bin Nussair School
- As'aad Aqil School

=== Posts ===
New Aleppo contains a large post office that includes landlines services and ADSL internet services.

Parks

- Al-Bei'ah (The Environment) Park
- Al-Shorta (Police quarter) Park
- Zein Al-Abidein Park
- Ibn Arabi Park
- Tiqaniat Al-hasoub (Computer tech.) Park
- Al-Bouhouth Park
- Al-Siddiq park

Hospitals

the neighbourhood houses many private hospitals

- Al-Shahbaa specialist hospital
- Syrian Specialist hospital
- Al-Rajaa Hospital
- Al-Zaytouni Hospital (Not Operating)
