= Qamhana =

Qamhana قمحانة Qomhane
- Town
- Interactive map of Qamhana
- Location in Syria
- Coordinates: 35°11′50″N 36°44′5″E
- Country: Syria
- Governorate: Hama
- District: Hama
- Subdistrict: Hama

Population (2004)
  - Total: 13,228
- Time zone: UTC+3 (AST)
- City Qrya Pcode: C3008

Qamhana (Arabic: قمحانة, also spelled Qomhane or Qomhana) is a Syrian town located in the Hama Subdistrict of the Hama District in Hama Governorate. It is situated immediately west of the Zayn al-Abidin Mountain. According to the Syria Central Bureau of Statistics (CBS), Qamhana had a population of 13,228 in the 2004 census. Its inhabitants are predominantly Sunni Muslim.

== Syrian Civil War ==
Unlike many predominantly Sunni Muslim towns in the Syrian countryside, the residents of Qamhana remained loyal to the Assad government during the Syrian Civil War. Many members of the regime's elite Tiger Forces militia were recruited from the settlement. During the 2024 Hama offensive, Qamhana witnessed intense fighting but ultimately fell to advancing rebel forces led by Hay'at Tahrir al-Sham on 5 December 2024.
