= Shaykh Najjar =

Shaykh Najjar Industrial City شيخ نجار
- Village
- Location within Syria
- Coordinates: 36°16′22″N 37°15′23″E
- Country: Syria
- Governorate: Aleppo Governorate
- District: Mount Simeon District
- Nahiyah: Huraytan

Population (2004 census)
  - Total: 2,588
- Time zone: UTC+2 (EET)
  - Summer (DST): UTC+3 (EEST)
- Website: www.aic.gov.sy

Shaykh Najjar (Arabic: شيخ نجار, also spelled Sheikh Najjar), sometimes referred to as Aleppo Industrial City, is an industrial city in northern Syria, administratively part of the Aleppo Governorate, located 10 kilometers northeast of Aleppo. Nearby localities include Kafr Saghir to the north, al-Muslimiyah to the northwest, Tell Shaghib to the south and Fah to the southeast. According to the Syrian Central Bureau of Statistics (CBS), Shaykh Najjar had a population of 2,588 in the 2004 census.

== Industrial city ==
Shaykh Najjar is a relatively new development and is the closest Syrian industrial center to the border with Turkey. By 2010–11, there were 1,923 companies operating in the industrial zone. About 40% of the firms inside the city are Turkish-owned. In addition to proximity, Turkish business owners benefit from tariff-free trade agreements between Syria and Turkey as well as the tariff-free exports of Turkish products made in Syria to the Arab world. Investors that open businesses inside the industrial zone are able to be assigned land and have the documents to proceed operations within 24 hours.

Shaykh Najjar is seen as one of the first urban developments built outside the ring roads of Aleppo. According to Anna Irene Del Monaco, an Italian researcher of urban landscapes, Shaykh Najjar has the potential of reducing the "proliferation of industrial zones in the fabric inside the ring roads" and would absorb more workers from the countryside of Aleppo.

During the ongoing Syrian civil war which began in 2011, clashes between the opposition rebels and government forces have resulted in the destruction of hundreds of businesses in Aleppo, including in Shaykh Najjar. According to a Reuters report from 4 October 2012, the industrial zone "is now little more than a ghost town where guards try to protect some factories at great risk to their lives." By October 2012, around 20 pharmaceutical plants discontinued production, causing the potential risk of a medicine shortage. By April 2021, 685 establishments had returned to the industrial city.

On 30 November 2024, the Syrian Democratic Forces took control of the city amidst the attack on Aleppo and the subsequent withdrawal of the pro-government forces.

On 2 December 2024, Tahrir al-Sham captured the Sheikh Najjar industrial zone from the SDF.
