= Dadikh =

Dadikh داديخ
- Village
- Location in Syria
- Coordinates: 35°48′1″N 36°43′50″E
- Country: Syria
- Governorate: Idlib
- District: Idlib District
- Subdistrict: Saraqib Nahiyah

Population (2004)
  - Total: 2,674
- Time zone: UTC+2 (EET)
  - Summer (DST): UTC+3 (EEST)
- City Qrya Pcode: C3910

Dadikh (Arabic: داديخ) is a Syrian village located in Saraqib Nahiyah in Idlib District, Idlib. According to the Syria Central Bureau of Statistics (CBS), Dadikh had a population of 2674 in the 2004 census.

== Syrian Civil War ==
Following the 'Dawn of Idlib 2' campaign, Dadikh became a part of the heavily contested Idlib frontline between Syrian military and Jihadist forces.

On 9 April 2022, two Syrian Army soldiers, including a captain, were killed in the village after HTS forces launched a sniping operation in the area.

On 11 December 2022, HTS militants launched an Inghimasi attack on a Syrian Army position on the outskirts of the village, killing at least 2 Syrian soldiers. The military position was blown up and destroyed during the attack.

On 28 November 2024, the Syrian Salvation Government led by Tahrir al-Sham captured the village from the Syrian Army.
