= Al-Buraq, Syria =

Al-Buraq البراق Burak
- Village
- Location in Syria
- Coordinates: 35.034213°N 36.794329°E
- Country: Syria
- Governorate: Hama
- District: Hama
- Subdistrict: Hama

Population (2004)
  - Total: 3,235
- Time zone: UTC+3 (AST)

Al-Buraq (Arabic: البراق, also spelled Burak or Braq) is a village in northern Syria, administratively part of the Hama Governorate, located southeast of Hama. Nearby localities include Ayyubiyah and Nisrin to the west, Maarin al-Jabal to the northwest, Surayhin to the north, al-Jinan to the northeast, Taqsis to the southeast and Tell Qartal to the south. According to the Syria Central Bureau of Statistics, al-Buraq had a population of 3,235 in the 2004 census.

In 1838 al-Buraq was classified as khirba ("ruined village.") During the Syrian civil war, in early February 2013, a reported bombing at a bus stop in the village killed 54 people, all civilians who worked at a nearby military non-lethal supplies factory. No group claimed responsibility for the attack.

== Bibliography ==
- Robinson, E.; Smith, E. (1841). Biblical Researches in Palestine, Mount Sinai and Arabia Petraea: A Journal of Travels in the year 1838. Vol. 3. Boston: Crocker & Brewster.
