= Billin, Syria =

Billin بللين Bellin
- Village
- Location in Syria
- Coordinates: 35°2′57″N 36°30′50″E
- Country: Syria
- Governorate: Hama
- District: Hama
- Subdistrict: Hama

Population (2004)
  - Total: 2,367
- Time zone: UTC+3 (AST)

Billin (Arabic: بللين, also spelled Bellin) is a village in northwestern Syria, administratively part of the Hama Governorate, located southwest of Hama. Nearby localities include Bisin to the south, al-Muaa to the southeast, Kafr Buhum to the east, al-Rabiaa to the northeast, Umm al-Tuyour to the north, Deir al-Salib to the northwest, Masyaf to the west, al-Bayyadiyah and al-Suwaydah to the southwest. According to the Syria Central Bureau of Statistics, Billin had a population of 2,367 in the 2004 census. Its inhabitants are predominantly Alawites.

== Bibliography ==
- Robinson, E.; Smith, E. (1841). Biblical Researches in Palestine, Mount Sinai and Arabia Petraea: A Journal of Travels in the year 1838. Vol. 3. Boston: Crocker & Brewster.
