= Ayyo =

Ayyo أيو
- Village
- Location in Syria
- Coordinates: 35.032737°N 36.734591°E
- Country: Syria
- Governorate: Hama
- District: Hama
- Subdistrict: Hama

Population (2004)
  - Total: 1,980
- Time zone: UTC+3 (AST)

Ayyo (Arabic: أيو) is a village in central Syria, administratively part of the Hama Governorate, located south of Hama. It is neighbored by Kafr Buhum to the northwest, al-Khalidiyah to the north, Maarin al-Jabal to the northeast, Besirin to the south and Sasikun to the southwest. According to the Syria Central Bureau of Statistics, Ayyo had a population of 1,980 in the 2004 census. Its inhabitants are predominantly Christians.

== History ==
In an 1828 Ottoman tax register, Ayyu was listed as a relatively small grain-growing village of 6 feddans and paying 660 qirsh in taxes. In 1838, it was recorded as a Greek Orthodox Christian village (though the authors spelled it 'Abbu').

== Bibliography ==
- Douwes, Dick (2000). The Ottomans in Syria: A History of Justice and Oppression. I.B. Tauris. ISBN 1860640311.
- Robinson, E.; Smith, E. (1841). Biblical Researches in Palestine, Mount Sinai and Arabia Petraea: A Journal of Travels in the year 1838. Vol. 3. Boston: Crocker & Brewster.
