= Kafr Buhum =

Town in central Syria

Kafr Buhum كفر بهم Kfarbo
- Town
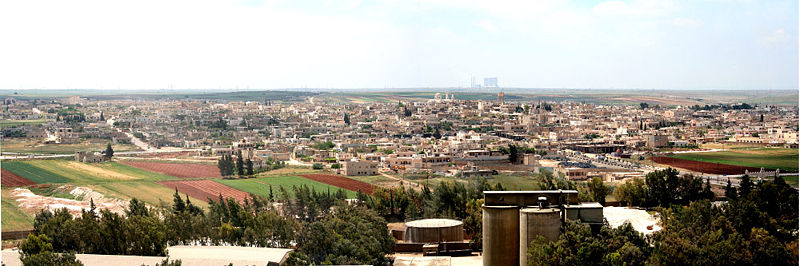
- Skyline of Kafr Buhum

- Location in Syria
- Coordinates: 35°3′40″N 36°41′50″E
- Country: Syria
- Governorate: Hama
- District: Hama
- Subdistrict: Hama
- Elevation: 330 m (1,080 ft)

Population (2004)
  - Total: 12,194
- Time zone: UTC+3 (AST)

Kafr Buhum (Arabic: كفر بهم, romanized: Kafr Buhum; also transliterated Kfarbuhum and Kafr Bihem), commonly referred to as Kfarbo (Arabic: كفربو), is a town in central Syria, administratively part of the Hama Governorate, located 9 kilometers (5.6 mi) southwest of Hama. Nearby localities include al-Rabiaa and Matnin to the northwest, Tayzin to the north, al-Khalidiyah to the east, Tell Qartal to the southeast, Birin to the south and al-Muah to the southwest. According to the Syria Central Bureau of Statistics (CBS), Kafr Buhum had a population of 12,194 in the 2004 census. Its inhabitants are predominantly Christian. It is 330 meters (1082 ft) above the sea level.

== History ==
=== Ottoman period ===
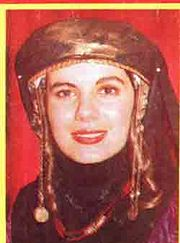
Traditional dress of a married woman in Kafr Buhum

Kafr Buhum was the birthplace of Patriarch Ignatius III Atiyah of the Greek Orthodox Church of Antioch (r. 1619–1634). In the mid-17th century, the village was noted as wealthy and had a population of 1,025 men, according to Patriarch Macarius III Ibn al-Za'im (r. 1647–1672).

Due to its access to irrigation from the Orontes River, Kafr Buhum was one of the cotton-growing villages of the Hama region in the 18th century. The date of the Monastery of St. George in Kafr Buhum is not known, though its oldest dated manuscript, penned by a local deacon, is from 1805. By the 19th century, during Ottoman rule (1516–1918), Kafr Buhum was one of the older-established villages in the environs of Hama. In a tax record from 1828–1829, it consisted of 72 feddans, making it one of the largest villages in the Hama Sanjak. Kafr Buhum and Maharda, the two large Christian villages of the area, paid the jizya (poll tax for Christians), though this accounted for 2% of its overall taxes, suggesting a relative clemency by the authorities on the rural Christian communities at that time.

Kafr Buhum contained a small Jewish community earlier during Ottoman rule but most had emigrated by the mid-19th century; Aleppine Jews maintained commercial interests in the village up to the mid-1830s. Kafr Buhum was also invested in by the urban elite of Hama, including the agha Abdallah Agha Tayfur, in the early 1840s.

=== Post-Syrian independence ===
In 1961 a cement factory was built in Kafr Buhum and at the time of its nationalization later in the decade it employed about 260 workers. Kafr Buhum's bid to become its own nahiya (subdistrict) center, instead of part of Hama Nahiyah, was denied in 1991 due to opposition from the local administration of Hama city, which sought to avoid a weakening of its administrative influence in the area.

== Bibliography ==
- Al-Dbiyat, Mohammed (1995). Homs et Hama en Syrie centrale: Concurrence urbaine et développement régional (in French). Presses de l'Ifpo. ISBN 2-901315-26-7.
- Douwes, Dick (2000). The Ottomans in Syria: A History of Justice and Oppression. I.B. Tauris. ISBN 1860640311.
- Panchenko, Constantin Alexandrovich (2016). Arab Orthodox Christians Under the Ottomans 1516–1831. Holy Trinity Publications.
- Reilly, James A. (2002). A Small Town in Syria: Ottoman Hama in the Eighteenth and Nineteenth Centuries. Peter Lang. ISBN 3-906766-90-X.
