= Surayhin =

Surayhin سريحين Serihin
- Village
- Location in Syria
- Coordinates: 35°11′51″N 36°40′2″E
- Country: Syria
- Governorate: Hama
- District: Hama
- Subdistrict: Hama

Population (2004)
  - Total: 7,466

Surayhin (Arabic: سريحين, also spelled Serihin) is a village in northwestern Syria, administratively part of the Hama Governorate, southeast of Hama. Nearby localities include al-Jajiyah to the north, al-Jinan to the southeast, al-Buraq to the south, Maarin al-Jabal to the southwest and al-Khalidiyah to the west. According to the Central Bureau of Statistics, Surayhin had a population of 7,466 in the 2004 census. Its inhabitants are predominantly Sunni Muslims.

== Bibliography ==
- Douwes, Dick (2000). The Ottomans in Syria: a history of justice and oppression. I.B. Tauris. ISBN 1860640311.
- Robinson, E.; Smith, E. (1841). Biblical Researches in Palestine, Mount Sinai and Arabia Petraea: A Journal of Travels in the year 1838. Vol. 3. Boston: Crocker & Brewster.
