= Al-Khalidiyah, Syria =

Al-Khalidiyah الخالدية Khaldiyeh
- Village
- Location in Syria
- Coordinates: 35°4′34″N 36°44′4″E
- Country: Syria
- Governorate: Hama
- District: Hama
- Subdistrict: Hama

Population (2004)
  - Total: 4,740
- Time zone: UTC+3 (AST)

Al-Khalidiyah (Arabic: الخالدية, also spelled Khaldiyeh) is a village in northwestern Syria, administratively part of the Hama Governorate, south of Hama. Nearby localities include Kafr Buhum to the southwest, Ayyubiyah to the south, Maarin al-Jabal to the southeast, al-Jinan to the east and Surayhin to the northeast. According to the Central Bureau of Statistics, al-Khalidiyah had a population of 4,740 in the 2004 census. Its inhabitants are predominantly Sunni Muslims.

== Bibliography ==
- Douwes, Dick (2000). The Ottomans in Syria: a history of justice and oppression. I.B. Tauris. ISBN 1860640311.
- Robinson, E.; Smith, E. (1841). Biblical Researches in Palestine, Mount Sinai and Arabia Petraea: A Journal of Travels in the year 1838. Vol. 3. Boston: Crocker & Brewster.
