= Maarzaf =

Ma'arzaf معرزاف
- Village
- Location in Syria
- Coordinates: 35°12′19″N 36°33′22″E
- Country: Syria
- Governorate: Hama
- District: Mahardah
- Subdistrict: Mahardah

Population (2004)
  - Total: 3,175
- Time zone: UTC+3 (AST)

Ma'arzaf or Ma'rzaf (Arabic: معرزاف) is a village in northern Syria, administratively part of the Hama Governorate, located northwest of Hama. Nearby localities include Asilah to the west, Mahardah to the north, Khitab to the east and Umm al-Tuyur to the south. According to the Syria Central Bureau of Statistics, Maarzaf had a population of 3,175 in the 2004 census. Its inhabitants are predominantly Sunni Muslims. Ma'arzaf contains the hamlet of al-Qubair, which came to global attention in 2012 as the site of the al-Qubair massacre.

== Bibliography ==
- Robinson, E.; Smith, E. (1841). Biblical Researches in Palestine, Mount Sinai and Arabia Petraea: A Journal of Travels in the year 1838. Vol. 3. Boston: Crocker & Brewster.
