= Hama Governorate clashes (2011–2012) =

Clashes During the Syrian Civil War

2011–2012 Hama Governorate clashes
- Part of the Early insurgency phase of the Syrian Civil War
Date	1 September 2011 – 14 April 2012 (7 months, 1 week and 6 days)
Location	Hama Governorate
Result	Temporary nation-wide cease-fire: Government forces largely clear rebels from Hama city; Continued low-level insurgency in countryside

Belligerents
Syrian Opposition	(Syria) Syrian Government

Units involved
(Syrian opposition) Free Syrian Army (Syrian opposition) Opposition protesters	Syrian Armed Forces; Syrian Army; Security agencies; Syrian Police; Shabiha

Strength
12,000 protesters and fighters	3,000 soldiers

Casualties and losses
1,403 opposition protesters and FSA fighters killed*	120 killed
- number includes civilians

The Hama Governorate clashes were a series of incidents of fighting during late 2011 and early 2012 in the Syrian Governorate of Hama, as part of the Early insurgency phase of the Syrian Civil War.

== 2011 ==
=== September ===
The Attorney General of the Hama Governorate announced his resignation on 1 September in response to the government crackdown on protests. The government claimed he had been kidnapped and forced to lie at gunpoint.

=== November ===
On 14 November, SANA, state controlled media, reported that 13 soldiers were killed in Hama. By 17 November, the protests seemed to have calmed down, and the city was under government control. The streets were still littered with burnt out vehicles and police checkpoints were dotted around the city, despite the return to relative calm However, the same day, security forces carried out raids on homes looking for military defectors and made arrests.

=== December ===
On 9 December, Hama saw the largest anti government protests in the city since August.

At least six members of the security forces were reported killed in Hama on 11 December in clashes with the opposition. Syrian authorities claimed to have arrested a suspected terrorist who was trying to plant a bomb near a residential building. There were also reports that several civilians had been shot, although it was not specified whether they were wounded or killed.

Loyalist soldiers reportedly fired upon a civilian car on 14 December, killing five people, in response, the Free Syrian Army staged an ambush against a loyalist convoy consisting of four jeeps, killing eight soldiers.

Pro Assad forces stormed the city on 14 December in an effort to put down the protests, resulting in at least ten civilian fatalities. Clashes broke out when the Free Syrian Army attempted to halt the incursion, and at least two armoured vehicles were disabled by the rebels during a battle at Hadid Bridge. Activists said that tanks opened fire with machineguns and troops burnt shops that adhered to the oppositions strike.

Soldiers shot six protests to death, on 29 December, as Arab League monitors arrived in the city.

== 2012 ==
=== January ===
Nine protesters in Hama were killed by security forces gunfire on 7 January 2012.

On 7 January 2012, Colonel Afeef Mahmoud Suleima of the Syrian Air Force logistics division defected from Bashar al-Assads government along with at least fifty of his men, and announced his defection on live television and ordered his men to protect protesters in the city of Hama. "We are from the army and we have defected because the government is killing civilian protesters. The Syrian army attacked Hama with heavy weapons, air raids and heavy fire from tanks...We ask the Arab League observers to come visit areas affected by air raids and attacks so you can see the damage with your own eyes, and we ask you to send someone to uncover the three cemeteries in Hama filled with more than 460 corpses." Colonel Suleima said in a statement.

On 25 January, Syrian army troops raided opposition controlled districts Bab Qebli, Hamidiyeh and Malaab killing at least 7 people, reportedly using artillery and sniper fire in the process.

At least 17 bodies were found with bullet wounds to the head on 28 January, which activists claim had been caused by Pro government forces when they launched an armoured raid into the city. At least one of those executed was a police deserter.

By late January 2012 activists said that four neighbourhoods in Hama were under opposition control.

=== February ===
Situation in Hama, mid-March 2012

According to Reuters, five government troops were killed "in clashes with rebel fighters in Qalaat al-Madyaq town in restive Hama area". Activists state that 10 FSA fighters were killed by the Syrian army in Kafr Nabudah in the Hama province. According to Syrian state TV, gunmen clashed with soldiers, causing the death of an officer and a sergeant and the injury of a corporal.

On 15 February, five soldiers were killed and nine were wounded during fighting with army deserters at Qalaat al-Madiq, in the central province of Hama.

On 28 February 2012, government forces shelled a town in Hama Province, Halfaya, killing 20 civilian villagers. Activists said the 20 deaths of Sunni Muslim villagers there were among at least 100 killed in the province in the last two weeks in government revenge attacks against innocent civilians.

=== March ===
By 27 March, the opposition had been controlling towns such as Qalaat al-Madiq and surrounding villages in Hama Province. Qalaat al-Madiq, a town with a historic castle that was shelled in the fighting was shelled by heavy barrages for 17 days. The army stormed the town with tanks. 4 civilians, 5 opposition fighters and 4 soldiers were said to have been killed but the group that reported this said that the army was still not in control of the town.

== Aftermath ==
Between the end of March and April, killings of soldiers in Hama continued.

In April, there was a major explosion in an opposition-held Hama neighbourhood, although its cause and casualty figures were disputed: state media reported 16 people killed after “an explosive device went off while a terrorist group were setting it up in a house which was used to make explosives”; opposition activists said 70 civilians were massacred when a row of cement shanty homes collapsed following intense government shelling.

The Syrian army engaged in heavy artillery shelling in Hama's suburbs. The clashes in Hama started after the rebels attacked government military checkpoints. According to opposition claims, after the military reportedly suffered four dead, the government troops started to shell residential areas, killing 30-37 civilians.

A massacre of some 78 people occurred in the small village of Al-Qubeir near Hama on 6 June 2012. Many of the victims were women and children, as they were in the previous Houla massacre in the Homs region.

State media claimed three rebels were killed by the Syrian army on 30 June. State media also stated that a rebel group led by Firas Imad al-Taa'meh had been decimated during clashes with the Army.

On 7 July, the state media claimed at least two rebels were killed when they tried to attack an army patrol

On 13 July, in Tremseh near Hama was bombarded by helicopter gunships and tanks and then stormed by militiamen who carried out execution-style killings; opposition activists said Assad forces killed more than 200, while State media blamed "terrorists".

On 29 July, the state media claimed at least 5 rebels were killed in a clash with the army in the Hama countryside.

In September-October, the opposition-held Masha al-Arb'een neighborhood, Hama, was demolished by government forces, with 40 acres razed.

On 5 November, the Syrian Observatory and FSA fighters claimed that 50 government soldiers were killed when Islamist rebels from Jabhat al-Nusra bombed a checkpoint near Hama. If true, it would be one of the deadliest single attacks of the war.

On 18 December, rebels fighters took control of the town of Halfaya near Hama.
