= Umm al-Tuyour, Hama Governorate =

Umm al-Tuyour أم الطيور Umm al-Tiyur
- Village
- Location in Syria
- Coordinates: 35°7′49″N 36°32′3″E
- Country: Syria
- Governorate: Hama
- District: Hama
- Subdistrict: Hama

Population (2004)
  - Total: 2,588
- Time zone: UTC+3 (AST)

Umm al-Tuyour (Arabic: أم الطيور, also spelled Umm al-Tiyur) is a village in northwestern Syria, administratively part of the Hama Governorate, located west of Hama. Nearby localities include Kafr al-Tun to the northeast, Maarzaf to the north, Aqrab to the northwest, Deir al-Salib to the southwest, Billin to the south, al-Rabiaa to the southeast and Tayzin to the east. According to the Syria Central Bureau of Statistics (CBS), Umm al-Tuyour had a population of 2,588 in the 2004 census. Its inhabitants are predominantly Alawites.

== Bibliography ==
- Robinson, E.; Smith, E. (1841). Biblical Researches in Palestine, Mount Sinai and Arabia Petraea: A Journal of Travels in the year 1838. Vol. 3. Boston: Crocker & Brewster.
