= Hama massacre =

Hama massacre may refer to:

- 1925 Hama uprising during the Great Syrian Revolt
- 1964 Hama riot
- During the Islamist uprising in Syria:
  - 1981 Hama massacre
  - 1982 Hama massacre
- During the Syrian civil war:
  - Ramadan Massacre, during the 2011 Siege of Hama
  - Al-Qubeir massacre (also known as the 2012 Hama massacre)
  - 2023 Islamic State attack on Hama (Syria)

== See also ==
- Battle of Hama (disambiguation)
- Hama offensive
