= Tell Sikkin =

Tell Sikkin تل سكين Tell Sikkin Qa'dah
- Village
- Location in Syria
- Coordinates: 35°14′31″N 36°28′16″E
- Country: Syria
- Governorate: Hama
- District: Mahardah
- Subdistrict: Mahardah

Population (2004)
  - Total: 1,963
- Time zone: UTC+3 (AST)
- City Qrya Pcode: C3439

Tell Sikkin (Arabic: تل سكين, also known as Tell Sikkin Qa'dah) is a Syrian village located in the Mahardah Subdistrict of the Mahardah District in Hama Governorate. According to the Syria Central Bureau of Statistics (CBS), Tell Sikkin had a population of 1,963 in the 2004 census.

Tell Sikkin was noted by Eli Smith in 1838.

== Bibliography ==
- Robinson, E.; Smith, E. (1841). Biblical Researches in Palestine, Mount Sinai and Arabia Petraea: A Journal of Travels in the year 1838. Vol. 3. Boston: Crocker & Brewster.
