= Abu Ubaydah, Syria =

Abu Ubaydah أبو عبيدة
- Village
- Location in Syria
- Coordinates: 35°16′32″N 36°34′44″E
- Country: Syria
- Governorate: Hama
- District: Mahardah
- Subdistrict: Mahardah

Population (2004)
  - Total: 745
- Time zone: UTC+3 (AST)
- City Qrya Pcode: C3450

Abu Ubaydah (Arabic: أبو عبيدة, also spelled Abu Obeideh) is a Syrian village located in the Mahardah Subdistrict of the Mahardah District in Hama Governorate. According to the Syria Central Bureau of Statistics (CBS), Abu Ubaydah had a population of 745 in the 2004 census.
