= Bisin =

Bisin can refer to:

- Bisinus (fl. 5th century), king of Thuringia
- Bisin, Syria, a village in Hama Governorate, Syria
