= Al-Arid =

Al-Arid العريض
- Village
- Location in Syria
- Coordinates: 35.276287°N 36.576109°E
- Country: Syria
- Governorate: Hama
- District: Mahardah
- Subdistrict: Mahardah

Population (2004)
  - Total: 124
- Time zone: UTC+3 (AST)
- City Qrya Pcode: N/A

Al-Arid (Arabic: العريض) is a Syrian hamlet located in the Mahardah Subdistrict of the Mahardah District in Hama Governorate. According to the Syria Central Bureau of Statistics (CBS), al-Arid had a population of 124 as of the 2004 census. Its inhabitants are predominantly Sunni Muslims.

== Bibliography ==
- Robinson, E.; Smith, E. (1841). Biblical Researches in Palestine, Mount Sinai and Arabia Petraea: A Journal of Travels in the year 1838. Vol. 3. Boston: Crocker & Brewster.
