= Hama offensive =

The Hama offensive may refer to a number of offensives launched by either armed Syrian opposition forces toward city of Hama or by Syrian government forces against rebels north of Hama throughout the Syrian civil war.

- Hama Governorate clashes (2011–12)
- 2012 Hama offensive
- 2013 Hama offensive
- 2014 Hama offensive
- 2015 Hama offensive
- 2016 Hama offensive
- Hama offensive (March–April 2017)
- Hama offensive (September 2017)
- Northeastern Hama offensive (2017)
- 2018 Hama offensive
- Northwestern Syria offensive (April-August 2019)
- 2024 Hama offensive

== See also ==
- Battle of Hama (disambiguation)
- Hama massacre
