= Shihat Hama =

Shihat Hama الشيحة Shiha
- Village
- Location in Syria
- Coordinates: 35°9′18″N 36°41′4″E
- Country: Syria
- Governorate: Hama
- District: Hama
- Subdistrict: Hama

Population (2004)
  - Total: 3,985

Shihat Hama (Arabic: الشيحة, romanized: al-Shīḥā, also spelled Shiha or al-Shyha) is a village in northwestern Syria, administratively part of the Hama Governorate, located just west of Hama. Nearby localities include Qamhana to the northeast, Khitab to the north, Kafr al-Tun to the west and Tayzin to the south. According to the Syria Central Bureau of Statistics (CBS), Shihat Hama had a population of 3,985 in the 2004 census.

== History ==
In 1818, during Ottoman rule (1517–1918), al-Shiha consisted of 18 feddans and paid 1,980 qirsh in taxes. In 1838, al-Shiha was recorded as a Sunni Muslim village.

In the late 19th century or early 20th century, the inhabitants of the village gradually sold off nearly all of their lands to the prominent landowning Barazi family of Hama city. Its inhabitants were Sunni Muslim Arabs. In the 1960s, it was noted that Shihat Hama contained several domed huts.

The village is administered by a municipality established in 1989. Other localities included in the municipality are Maar Daftein, al-Qadiriyah and Mazraat al-Safa.

== Bibliography ==
- Boulanger, Robert (1966). The Middle East, Lebanon, Syria, Jordan, Iraq, Iran. Hachette.
- Comité de l'Asie française (April 1933). "Notes sur la propriété foncière dans le Syrie centrale (Notes on Landownership in Central Syria)". Bulletin du Comité de l'Asie française (in French). 33 (309). Comité de l'Asie française: 130–136.
- Douwes, Dick (2000). The Ottomans in Syria: A History of Justice and Oppression. I.B. Tauris. ISBN 1860640311.
- Robinson, E.; Smith, E. (1841). Biblical Researches in Palestine, Mount Sinai and Arabia Petraea: A Journal of Travels in the year 1838. Vol. 3. Boston: Crocker & Brewster.
