= Zawr al-Qaadah =

Zawr al-Qaadah زور القعادة Zor el-Qaada
- Village
- Location in Syria
- Coordinates: 35°15′58″N 36°29′16″E
- Country: Syria
- Governorate: Hama
- District: Mahardah
- Subdistrict: Mahardah

Population (2004)
  - Total: 2,064
- Time zone: UTC+3 (AST)
- City Qrya Pcode: C3449

Zawr al-Qaadah (Arabic: زور القعادة) is a Syrian village located in the Mahardah Subdistrict of the Mahardah District in Hama Governorate. According to the Syria Central Bureau of Statistics (CBS), Zawr al-Qaadah had a population of 2,064 in the 2004 census.
