= Shabiha =

Term for militias loyal to Ba'athist Syria

- شبيحة
- Flag of Ba'athist Syria
- Leaders: Maher al-Assad; Fawaz al-Assad; Mundhir al-Assad; Numeir al-Assad; Zaino Berri † (Aleppo leader); Ayman Jaber (Latakia leader); Mohammed al-Assad † (Qardaha leader)
- Dates active: 1980s – 2012 (independently); 2012 – 2024 (as part of the NDF)
- Merged into: NDF
- Allegiance: Ba'athist Syria; Assad family
- Groups: Al-Assad's group; Berri clan militias
- Ideology: Assadism
- Size: 5,000–10,000 (2011)
- Wars: Syrian civil war; June 2011 Jisr ash-Shughur clashes; 2012 Homs offensive; Hama Governorate clashes (2011–2012); Daraa Governorate clashes (2011–2013); Deir ez-Zor clashes (2011–2014); Battle of Rastan (January–February 2012); 2012 Aleppo Governorate clashes; Idlib Governorate clashes (June 2012 – April 2013); Battle of Aleppo (2012–16); Rif Dimashq offensive (August–October 2012); Battle of Tremseh; Siege of Homs

Shabiha (Levantine Arabic: شَبِّيحَة Šabbīḥa, pronounced [ʃabˈbiːħa]; also romanized Shabeeha or Shabbiha; lit. 'thugs') is a colloquial and generally derogatory term for various loosely-organised Syrian militias loyal to the Ba'athist government and the Assad family prior to the regime's collapse in 2024, used particularly during the initial phase of the Syrian civil war. As the war evolved, many groups that had previously been considered shabiha were amalgamated into the National Defence Force (NDF) and other paramilitary groups.

The militias consisted of mostly Alawite men paid by the regime to eliminate figures of its domestic opposition and alleged fifth-columnists. The Shabiha were established in the 1980s to smuggle weapons to the Syrian soldiers stationed in Lebanon during the Lebanese Civil War and Syrian occupation of Lebanon. While most Shabiha were members of the Alawite minority, the main common denominator of the groups was loyalty to the Assad family rather than religion, and in areas such as Aleppo they were primarily Sunni.

The Shabiha were founded in the 1980s by Nimir al-Assad (President Hafez al-Assad's cousin) and Rifaat al-Assad (Hafez al-Assad's brother). They were originally concentrated in the Syrian coastal region around Latakia, Baniyas, and Tartous, where they profited from smuggling through the region's ports.

Known by Alawites in Syria as an Alawite gang, during the late 1980s and early 1990s they smuggled food, cigarettes, and other goods, with government support, from Syria to Lebanon and sold them for considerable profit. Luxury cars, weapons, and drugs were smuggled in the opposite direction, from Lebanon to Syria. The Shabiha are loyal to various members of the Assad family. They were untouchable and unarrested, operating with impunity from the Syrian authorities. The Shabiha gained notoriety in the 1990s for the brutality they imposed on the Syrian coast.

The word became common in the 1990s, when it was being used to refer to "thugs" who worked with the government and often drove Mercedes-Benz S-Class and gave their guards the same car; that specific car model was nicknamed Shabah (Ghost) in many Arabic countries which led to its drivers being called Shabeeh. The Syrian opposition stated that the shabiha are a tool of the government for cracking down on dissent. The Syrian Observatory for Human Rights has stated that some of the shabiha are mercenaries. Strongly loyal to the Assad regime and containing anti-Sunni factions, shabiha militias are discreetly financed by powerful Syrian businessmen, and have often been responsible for the more brutal actions against the opposition, including possible massacres. Psychological warfare against Syria's Sunni population is also known to have been employed by Alawi Shabiha, which includes demonising Sunni religious beliefs and usage of deriding slogans such as "There is no God but Bashar".

Shabiha, thugs, and other such terms are not a new phenomenon. During the Arab Spring revolutions, they were used politically by some governments and influential individuals to disrupt the revolutions and intimidate the rebels and demonstrators. Enemies of the revolutions also attempted to use gangs to further their political and religious goals.

== Before the Syrian civil war ==
According to defectors privately interviewed by The Star in 2012, 'Shabiha mercenaries' were established in the 1980s by Rifaat al-Assad and Namir al-Assad, President Hafez al-Assad's brother and cousin. They were originally concentrated in the Mediterranean region of Syria around Latakia, Banias and Tartous, where they allegedly benefited from smuggling through the ports in the area. The shabiha, who were named for the Arabic word for ghost or for the Mercedes-Benz W140 that was popular for its smuggling sized trunk and was called the Shabah, were known by the Alawites in Syria as Alawi ganglords. During the late 1980s and early 1990s, they smuggled food, cigarettes and commodities, subsidized by the government, from Syria into Lebanon and sold them for a massive profit, while luxury cars, guns and drugs were smuggled in reverse from Lebanon up the Bekaa Valley and into Syria's state controlled economy.

The shabiha guards, who each had loyalty to different members of the extended Assad family, were untouchable and operated with impunity from the local authorities. They gained notoriety in the 1990s for the brutal way they enforced their protection rackets in Latakia and were noted for their cruelty and blind devotion to their leaders. By the mid-1990s, they had gotten out of hand, and President Hafez al-Assad had his son Bassel al-Assad clamp down on them, which he did successfully. In 2000, when Bashar al-Assad came to power, they were apparently disbanded, but following the uprising that began in March 2011, the shabiha gangs, which evolved into the shabiha militias, were again approved by Assad's government.

== Syrian civil war ==
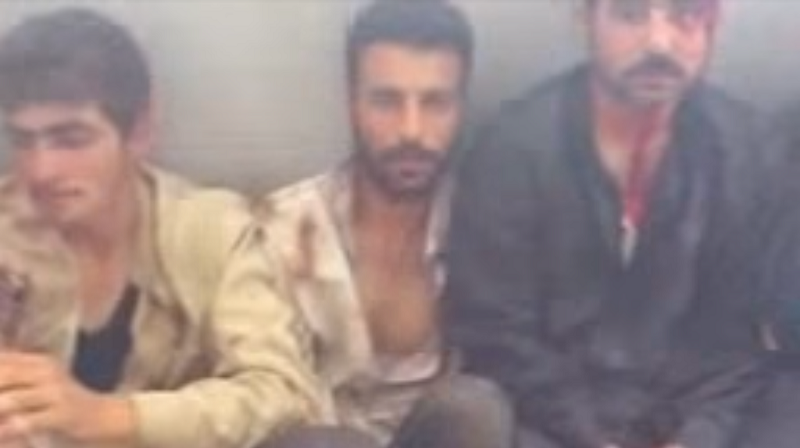
Berri clan militiamen, considered to be "Shabiha", after their capture by the al-Tawhid Brigade in Aleppo, July 2012

Upon the outbreak of the Syrian Revolution in 2011, the regime deployed the Shabiha death squads upon the demonstrators, ordering them to execute sectarian attacks on the protestors, torture Sunni demonstrators and engage in anti-Sunni rhetoric. This policy led to large-scale desertions within the army ranks and further defections of officers who began forming a resistance movement. In March 2011, activists reported that Shabiha drove through Latakia in cars armed with machine guns firing at protesters, and then later of taking up sniper position on rooftops and killing up to 21 people. It was reported by local activists that on 18 and 19 April that the shabiha and security forces killed 21 protesters in Homs.

The Syrian opposition, foreign governments, and human rights organizations accuse the shabiha militia of being a tool of the Syrian regime, operating as mercenaries to track down political opponents.The shabiha are accused of committing several atrocities and massacres in Syria after the revolution, including the Houla massacre and the Qubeir massacre in 2012.

In May, Foreign Affairs reported that the shabiha joined the 4th Armoured Division, led by Maher al-Assad, and attacked civilians in the cities of Banias, Jableh, and Latakia." A month later in June, witnesses and refugees from the northwestern region said that the shabiha have reemerged during the uprising and were being used by the Assad regime to carry out "a scorched earth campaign […] burning crops, ransacking houses and shooting randomly." The Washington Post reported a case in which four sisters were raped by shabiha members.

The shabiha are described to wear civilian clothes, trainers and white running shoes and often are taking steroids. A physician explained that "many of the men were recruited from bodybuilding clubs and encouraged to take steroids. They are treated like animals, and manipulated by their bosses to carry out these murders". Many shabiha were described by locals as having shaved heads, thin beards and white trainers. It was also reported by Syrian locals that some elements in the Shabiha were contemplating plans to clear Sunni Muslim villages from the Alawi northwest in the hopes of creating an easily defendable rump state. One militiaman said he was ready to kill women and children to defend his friends, family and president: "Sunni women are giving birth to babies who will fight us in years to come, so we have the right to fight anyone who can hurt us in the future".

In July 2012, a captured alleged shabiha member admitted looting and murder, stating that it was for "money and power". The newspaper Toronto Star describes Shabiha as "mafia militia […] smuggling commodities, appliances, drugs and guns between Syria and Lebanon at the behest of Assad’s extended family" and the Telegraph as "a group that suffers from a dangerous cocktail of religious indoctrination, minority paranoia and smuggler roots". The United Nations report published in August 2012 condemned the shabiha for sectarian attacks against Sunni civilians, murdering protesters, detaining army members of Sunni background and for carrying out the Houla massacre which killed at least 108 Sunni civilians, including 41 children.

In December 2012, NBC News reporter Richard Engel and his five crew members were abducted in Latakia. Having escaped after five days in captivity, Engel held a Shabiha group responsible for the abduction. Engel's account was however challenged from early on. More than two years later, following further investigation by The New York Times, it however came out that the NBC team "was almost certainly taken by a Sunni criminal element affiliated with the Free Syrian Army," rather than by a loyalist Shia group.

The Syrian opposition, foreign governments, and human rights organizations accuse the Shabiha militia of being a tool of the Syrian regime, operating as mercenaries to track down political opponents. The Shabiha are accused of committing several atrocities and massacres in post-revolution Syria, including the Houla massacre and the 2012 al-Qubeir massacre.

=== Houla massacre ===
On May 25, 2012, 78 people, including 49 children, were killed in two opposition-controlled villages in the Houla Region of Syria, a cluster of villages north of Homs. While a small proportion of the deaths appeared to have resulted from artillery and tank rounds used against the villages, the foreign press later announced that most of the massacre's victims had been "summarily executed in two separate incidents", and that witnesses affirmed that the Shabiha were the most likely perpetrators. Townspeople described how Shabiha, from Shia/Alawite villages to the south and west of Houla (Kabu and Felleh were named repeatedly), entered the town after shelling of the ground for several hours. According to one eyewitness, the killers had written Shia slogans on their foreheads. The U.N. reported that "entire families were shot in their houses", and video emerged of children with their skulls split open. Others had been shot or knifed to death, some with their throats cut.

The fifteen nations of the U.N. Security Council unanimously condemned the massacre, with Russia and China agreeing to a resolution on the Syrian Civil War for the first time. The U.S., U.K., and eleven other nations–the Netherlands, Australia, France, Germany, Italy, Japan, Spain, Bulgaria, Canada and Turkey–jointly expelled Syrian ambassadors and diplomats already 4 days after the massacre took place.

=== Alleged role in Al-Qubair massacre ===
Another massacre was reported but not investigated by local villagers and activists to have taken place in the Syrian settlement of Al-Qubair on June 6, 2012, only two weeks after the killings at Houla. According to BBC News, Al-Qubair is a farming settlement inside the village of Maarzaf.

According to activists, 28 people were killed, many of them women and children. The day after the massacre, UNSMIS observers attempted to enter Al-Qubair to verify the reports, but were fired upon and forced to retreat by Sunni armed militia that had entered the city the day before. Victims were reportedly stabbed and shot by Shabiha forces loyal to the government of Bashar al-Assad, according to the victim's families. Reports published by the German newspaper FAZ in June 2012, claimed that the Houla massacre was instead perpetrated by rebel militias antagonistic to the Syrian government.

== Leadership ==
In the coastal region, the group is reportedly led by Fawaz al-Assad and Munzer al-Assad, first cousins of President Assad. Another source, Mahmoud Merhi, head of the Arab Organization for Human Rights, has been quoted as saying that "most Syrians view" the Shabiha as "operating without any known organization or leadership." Sunni and Alawite businessmen who are protecting their own interests in the country are alleged to be paying the groups.

In Aleppo: Abdul Malik Bri, Zeno Bri, and the Bri gang.

In Damascus: Issam Zahreddine, Moataz Shamso.

In Hama: Talal Daqaq, Ali Al-Shala, Salah Al-Asi.

In Latakia: Hilal al-Assad, Muhammad Tawfiq al-Assad, Haroun al-Assad, Fawaz al-Assad, Jaafar Shalish, Muhannad Hatem, Ayman Jaber

In Latakia: Hilal al-Assad, Muhammad Tawfiq al-Assad, Haroun al-Assad, Fawaz al-Assad, Jaafar Shalish, Muhannad Hatem, and Ayman Jaber.Muhammad Tawfiq al-Assad is known as the "Sheikh of the Mountain" and is considered one of the most prominent Shabiha leaders, in the full sense of the term. Like many other members of the al-Assad family, such as Haroun, Hilal, and Fawaz, Muhammad is a notorious Shabiha leader and smuggler, having amassed a vast fortune through smuggling, theft, trafficking, and extortion.

== Accusation of looting and outside analysis ==
Aron Lund, a Swedish journalist specializing in Middle East issues, says that post-2011 the term "Shabbiha" is generally used as a generalized, insulting description of an Assad supporter.

British newspaper Sunday Times and pan-Arab network Al-Arabiya have reported on Shabiha militia stealing Roman antiquities and selling them on the black market in Syria and Lebanon.

== See also ==
- National Defence Forces
- Popular Committees
- Defense Companies
- Struggle Companies
- List of armed groups in the Syrian Civil War
- Basij, Iranian equivalent
- Popular Army and Fedayeen Saddam, historical Saddamist Iraqi equivalents
- Popular Mobilisation Forces, Current Iraqi equivalent
- Colectivos, Venezuelan equivalent
- Janjaweed and Rapid Support Forces, Sudanese equivalents
- Petrus, historical Indonesian equivalent
- Tonton Macoute, historical Haitian equivalent
- Kadyrovites, Russian equivalent in Chechnya
- Schutzstaffel, historical Nazi equivalent
- Extermination battalions, historical Stalinist Soviet equivalent
- Red Guards, historical Maoist Chinese equivalent
