= Khirbet Subin =

Khirbet Subin خربة سوبين
- Village
- Location in Syria
- Coordinates: 35°11′1″N 36°37′55″E
- Country: Syria
- Governorate: Hama
- District: Mahardah
- Subdistrict: Mahardah

Population (2004)
  - Total: 310
- Time zone: UTC+3 (AST)
- City Qrya Pcode: C3441

Khirbet Subin (Arabic: خربة سوبين) is a Syrian village located in the Mahardah Subdistrict of the Mahardah District in Hama Governorate. According to the Syria Central Bureau of Statistics (CBS), Khirbet Subin had a population of 310 in the 2004 census.
