= Battle of Hama =

Battle of Hama may refer to:

- Battle of Hamath (605 BC), Nebuchadnezzar II of Babylonia defeats the Egyptians
- Battle of Hama (903), Abbasids under Al-Katib defeat Ismailis
- Battle of Hama (1178), Ayyubids under Mengüverish defeat the Crusaders

Syrian civil war battles:

- Hama Governorate clashes (2011–12)
- 2012 Hama offensive
- 2013 Hama offensive
- 2014 Hama offensive
- 2015 Hama offensive
- 2016 Hama offensive
- Hama offensive (March–April 2017)
- Hama offensive (September 2017)
- Northeastern Hama offensive (2017)
- 2018 Hama offensive
- Northwestern Syria offensive (April-August 2019)
- 2024 Hama offensive, Syrian rebel forces capture Hama

== See also ==
- Hama offensive
- Hama massacre
