= Huwat =

Huwat الهوات
- Village
- Location in Syria
- Coordinates: 35.227331°N 36.520604°E
- Country: Syria
- Governorate: Hama
- District: Mahardah District
- Subdistrict: Mahardah Nahiyah

Population (2004)
  - Total: 128
- Time zone: UTC+3 (AST)
- City Qrya Pcode: C3448

Huwat (Arabic: الهوات) is a Syrian village located in Mahardah Nahiyah in Mahardah District, Hama. According to the Syria Central Bureau of Statistics (CBS), Huwat had a population of 128 in the 2004 census.
