= Abu Rubays =

Abu Rubays أبو ربيص
- Village
- Location in Syria
- Coordinates: 35°12′28″N 36°31′15″E
- Country: Syria
- Governorate: Hama
- District: Mahardah
- Subdistrict: Mahardah

Population (2004)
  - Total: 619
- Time zone: UTC+3 (AST)
- City Qrya Pcode: C3442

Abu Rubays (Arabic: أبو ربيص, also spelled Abu Rubeis or Abu Rbeis) is a Syrian village located in the Mahardah Subdistrict of the Mhardeh District in Hama Governorate. According to the Syria Central Bureau of Statistics (CBS), Abu Rubays had a population of 619 in the 2004 census.
