= Mafkar =

Mafkar مفكر
- Village
- Location in Syria
- Coordinates: 35.0103°N 37.2250°E
- Country: Syria
- Governorate: Hama
- District: Salamiyah
- Subdistrict: Barri Sharqi

Population (2004)
  - Total: 1,605
- Time zone: UTC+3 (AST)
- City Qrya Pcode: C3270

Mafkar (Arabic: مفكر, also transliterated al-Mufakkir) is a village in central Syria, administratively part of the Barri Sharqi Subdistrict of the Salamiyah District of the Hama Governorate. It is located 52 kilometers (32 mi) east of Hama and 22 kilometers (14 mi) north of Salamiyah. It consists of two parts, Mafkar Sharqi (East Mafkar) and Mafkar Gharbi (West Mafkar); the two parts are considered neighborhoods and sometimes, as separate villages.

According to the Syria Central Bureau of Statistics (CBS), Mafkar Sharqi had a population of 802 and Mafkar Gharbi had a population of 803 in the 2004 census. The inhabitants are predominantly Ismaili Shia Muslims.

== History ==
Mafkar was founded in c. 1900, one of several villages with Byzantine-era ruins established on the margins of the Syrian steppe east of Hama beginning in the mid-19th century to repopulate and recultivate the area, which was long vulnerable to Bedouin raiding. The village was first inhabited by families from Taqsis, but they left for unclear reasons. The oldest-established families of the current village are the Al Suwaydan and Al Abu Qasim families.

As of 2010, most of the inhabitants were economically dependent on mostly rainfed agriculture, with the main crops being grapes and olives. The village had been locally well known for its large potato farms, but those dwindled to a meager 20 dunams by 2010. Over half of the village's inhabitants had emigrated by then to the district capital of Salamiyah for better prospects.

During the Syrian civil war, in the summer of 2013, the Ismaili inhabitants of the village left for Salamiyah, at least temporarily, while Syrian government forces and Syrian rebels fought in and around their village. Many of their homes were looted by pro-government forces.
