= Al-Rabiaa =

Al-Rabiaa الربيعة Al-Rabie
- Village
- Location in Syria
- Coordinates: 35°5′58″N 36°36′49″E
- Country: Syria
- Governorate: Hama
- District: Hama
- Subdistrict: Hama

Population (2004)
  - Total: 2,129
- Time zone: UTC+3 (AST)

Al-Rabiaa (Arabic: الربيعة, also spelled al-Rabie or Rabi'a) is a village in northwestern Syria, administratively part of the Hama Governorate, west of Hama. Nearby localities include Tayzin and Matnin to the east, Kafr al-Tun to the north, Umm al-Tuyur to the northwest, Deir al-Salib to the west, Billin to the southwest, al-Muaa to the south and Kafr Buhum to the southeast. According to the Central Bureau of Statistics (CBS), al-Rabiaa had a population of 7,508 in the 2004 census. Its inhabitants are predominantly Alawites.

== History ==
In 1838, its inhabitants were noted to be predominantly Sunni Muslims.

=== Syrian Civil War ===
After the fall of the Assad regime, on 4 June 2025, eight Alawite civilians were shot dead by Syrian state security forces at a checkpoint in the Village.

== Bibliography ==
- Robinson, E.; Smith, E. (1841). Biblical Researches in Palestine, Mount Sinai and Arabia Petraea: A Journal of Travels in the year 1838. Vol. 3. Boston: Crocker & Brewster.
