= Taqsis =

Taqsis تقسيس Zawr az Ziyarah
- Village
- Location in Syria
- Coordinates: 35°0′57″N 36°51′43″E
- Country: Syria
- Governorate: Hama
- District: Hama
- Subdistrict: Hama

Population (2004)
  - Total: 3,343

Taqsis (Arabic: تقسيس), also known as Zawr al-Ziyarah (Arabic: زور الزيارة), is a village in central Syria, administratively part of the Hama Governorate, located 25 kilometers (16 mi) southeast of Hama. Nearby localities include al-Jinan to the north, al-Buraq to the northwest, Tell Qartal to the west, Ghor al-Assi to the southwest, Izz al-Din to the southeast and Taldarah to the east. According to the Central Bureau of Statistics (CBS), Taqsis had a population of 3,343 in the 2004 census.

== History ==
During early Ottoman rule, in 1573, a water installation was built in the area of Taqsis. It consisted of an aqueduct and a tower, alongside which were two noria (na'ura) wheels. It was built in the typical style of old dams along the Orontes River. The norias no longer exist and the dam is mostly in ruins, although the remainder of the structure is in relatively good condition.

Taqsis had been abandoned sometime in the last years of the 18th-century, and in 1838 the village was classified as a khirba (ruined village). Towards the end of Khedivate Egyptian rule (1832-1841), Taqsis was among 20 villages along the edge of the Syrian Desert to be repopulated. While most of these small, agricultural places were abandoned during the 1840s due to the pressures of warring nomadic tribes, Taqsis remained occupied.

During World War I the inhabitants of Taqsis, needing to obtain seeds and advances for their croplands, sold their lands to the Barazi family of Hama, who owned numerous other villages in the Hama district. As late as the 1930s, the villagers cultivated the lands on behalf of the Barazi family and their ownership was limited to the plots occupied by their homes.

== Bibliography ==
- De Miranda, Adriana (2007). Water Architecture in the Lands of Syria: The Water-wheels. L'Erma di Bretschneider. ISBN 88-8265-433-8.
- Comité de l'Asie française (April 1933). "Notes sur la propriété foncière dans le Syrie centrale (Notes on Landownership in Central Syria)". Bulletin du Comité de l'Asie française (in French). 33 (309). Comité de l'Asie française: 131–133.
- Douwes, Dick (2000). The Ottomans in Syria: a history of justice and oppression. I.B. Tauris. ISBN 1860640311.
- Robinson, E.; Smith, E. (1841). Biblical Researches in Palestine, Mount Sinai and Arabia Petraea: A Journal of Travels in the year 1838. Vol. 3. Boston: Crocker & Brewster.
