= Khitab =

Khitab خطاب Khutab Khattab
- Town
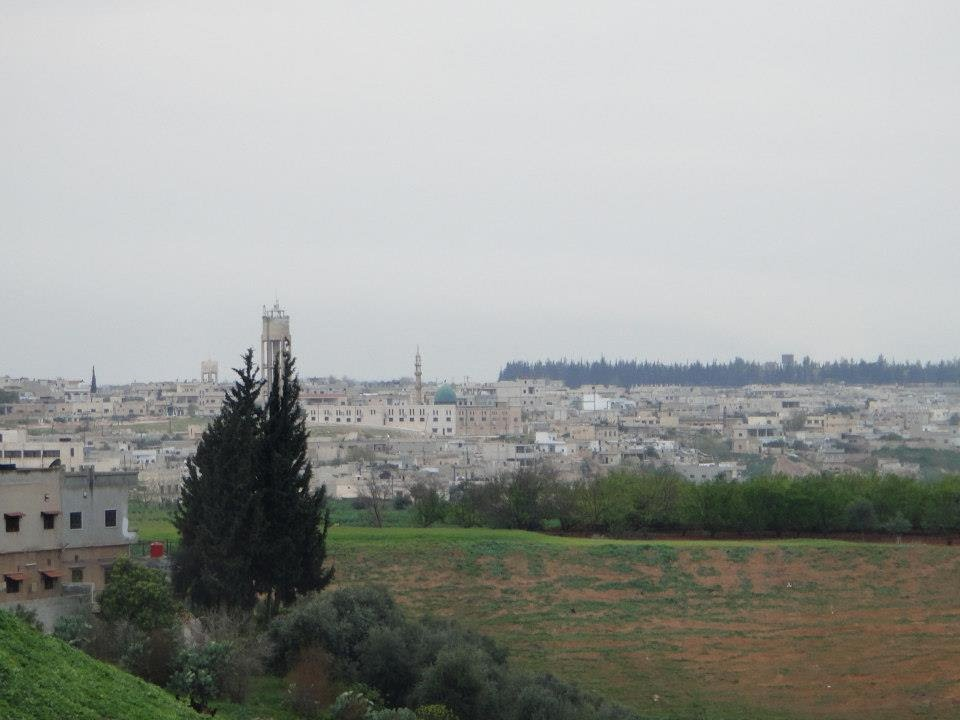
- Interactive map of Khitab
- Location in Syria
- Coordinates: 35°11′51″N 36°40′2″E
- Country: Syria
- Governorate: Hama
- District: Hama
- Subdistrict: Hama

Population (2004)
  - Total: 10,830
- Time zone: UTC+3 (AST)

Khattab (Arabic: خطاب, also spelled Khutab or Khattab) is a town in northwestern Syria, administratively part of the Hama Governorate, northwest of Hama located near the Orontes River. Nearby localities include Qamhana to the east, Shihat Hama to the southeast, Kafr al-Tun to the southwest, al-Majdal to the west, Mhardeh and Halfaya to the northwest and Taybat al-Imam to the northeast. According to the Central Bureau of Statistics, Khitab had a population of 10,830 in the 2004 census. Its inhabitants are predominantly Sunni Muslims.

In late 1829, during the Ottoman era, Khitab was part of the Hama Sanjak. It consisted of 55 feddans and paid 5,610 qirsh in taxes to the treasury. In 1838, Khitab was recorded as a Sunni Muslim village.

In the 1930s, during French Mandatory rule, about two-thirds of Khitab's lands were mortgaged from the al-Azm family, the rest mortgaged from the Kaylani family; both were part of the urban landowning elites of Hama. The inhabitants of the village were Sunni Muslim Arab farmers.

During the Syrian Civil War, many men from the town were recruited into the regime's Tarmeh Regiment. At the same time, there were many in the town who supported the revolution.

== Bibliography ==
- Comité de l'Asie française (April 1933). "Notes sur la propriété foncière dans le Syrie centrale (Notes on Landownership in Central Syria)". Bulletin du Comité de l'Asie française (in French). 33 (309). Comité de l'Asie française: 130–136.
- Douwes, Dick (2000). The Ottomans in Syria: A History of Justice and Oppression. I.B. Tauris. ISBN 1860640311.
- Robinson, E.; Smith, E. (1841). Biblical Researches in Palestine, Mount Sinai and Arabia Petraea: A Journal of Travels in the year 1838. Vol. 3. Boston: Crocker & Brewster.
