= 2023 Islamic State attack on Hama (Syria) =

Islamic State massacre in Syria

2023 Hama attack
- Part of the Syrian civil war
- Location: Desert near Hama, Hama Governorate, Syria
- Date: 16 April 2023
- Target: Truffle hunters
- Attack type: Massacre
- Deaths: 36
- Perpetrator: Islamic State

On 16 April 2023, 36 truffle hunters were killed in the desert near Hama in Hama Governorate, Syria, when their group was attacked by Islamic State insurgents. Seventeen of the dead were reportedly also pro-regime NDF fighters. On the same day, Islamic State gunmen opened fire at a group of shepherds near Deir ez-Zor, killing five shepherds and 250 sheep.

== Background ==
Truffle hunting is a popular activity in many parts of Syria because of the value of truffles; one kilogram can be worth up to US$25, which is greater than the average monthly wage in that country. Islamic State insurgents notably targeted truffle hunters in 2023, with attacks resulting in particularly high death tolls. On 17 February 2023, Islamic State militants attacked a group of truffle hunters in Al-Sukhnah in Homs Governorate, killing 61 truffle hunters and 7 soldiers. Six days later on 23 February, IS militants killed 15 truffle hunters and kidnapped 40 others in Hama Governorate. Attacks on truffle hunters since February 2023 have resulted in more than 150 deaths.

== Attack ==
During the attack, 36 people were killed in the desert near Hama in Hama Governorate. Seventeen of the dead truffle hunters were pro-regime NDF fighters. In a separate attack on the same day, Islamic State insurgents attacked a group of shepherds with gunfire. According to the Syrian Observatory for Human Rights, five shepherds were killed and two other shepherds were reportedly kidnapped. 250 sheep were also killed, and the remaining livestock stolen.
