= Matnin =

Matnin متنين Mitneen
- Village
- Location in Syria
- Coordinates: 35°6′40″N 36°36′3″E
- Country: Syria
- Governorate: Hama
- District: Hama
- Subdistrict: Hama

Population (2004)
  - Total: 2,446
- Time zone: UTC+3 (AST)

Matnin (Arabic: متنين, also spelled Mitneen) is a village in northwestern Syria, administratively part of the Hama Governorate, located just west of Hama. Nearby localities include Tayzin to the north, al-Rabiaa to the west, Birin to the south and Kafr Buhum to the southeast. According to the Central Bureau of Statistics (CBS), Matnin had a population of 2,446 in the 2004 census. Its inhabitants are predominantly Sunni Muslims.
