= Bisin, Syria =

Bisin بيصين Biseen
- Village
- Location in Syria
- Coordinates: 35°0′9″N 36°30′13″E
- Country: Syria
- Governorate: Hama
- District: Hama
- Subdistrict: Hirbnafsah

Population (2004)
  - Total: 3,224
- Time zone: UTC+3 (AST)

Bisin (Arabic: بيصين, also spelled Biseen) is a village in northwestern Syria, administratively part of the Hama Governorate, located southwest of Hama. Nearby localities include Billin to the north, al-Muaa to the northeast, Deir al-Fardis to the east, Mousa al-Houla to the southeast, Tell Dahab and Houla to the south, Aqrab and Baarin to the southwest, al-Bayyadiyah to the west and al-Suwaydah to the northwest. According to the Syria Central Bureau of Statistics, Bisin had a population of 3,224 in the 2004 census. Its inhabitants are predominantly Alawites.

== Bibliography ==
- Douwes, Dick (2000). The Ottomans in Syria: a history of justice and oppression. I.B. Tauris. ISBN 1860640311.
- Robinson, E.; Smith, E. (1841). Biblical Researches in Palestine, Mount Sinai and Arabia Petraea: A Journal of Travels in the year 1838. Vol. 3. Boston: Crocker & Brewster.
