= Kafr al-Tun =

Kafr al-Tun كفر الطون Kfar Eltun
- Municipality
- Location in Syria
- Coordinates: 35°11′51″N 36°40′2″E
- Country: Syria
- Governorate: Hama
- District: Hama
- Subdistrict: Hama

Population (2004)
  - Total: 2,655
- Time zone: UTC+3 (AST)

Kafr al-Tun (Arabic: كفر الطون, also spelled Kfar Eltun) is a village in northwestern Syria, administratively part of the Hama Governorate, located 15 kilometers (9.3 mi) west of Hama. Nearby localities include al-Majdal to the northwest, Khitab to the northeast, Shihat Hama to the east, Tayzin to the southeast and al-Rabiaa to the east.

According to the Central Bureau of Statistics, Kafr al-Tun had a population of 2,655 in the 2004 census. Its inhabitants are Sunni Muslims, of local Arab tribal origin. Village life was characterized by rural Arab traditions and customs. As of 2010, Kafr al-Tun had one preparatory school and one primary school.

== History ==
In an Ottoman government record from 1818, Kafr al-Tun was listed as a grain-growing village consisting of 30 feddans and paid 3,080 qirsh in taxes. In 1838, it was listed as a Sunni Muslim village.

In 2008, the Kafr al-Tun Municipality was established to administer the village, along with nearby Kafr Amim and several farming hamlets.

== Bibliography ==
- Comité de l'Asie française (April 1933). "Notes sur la propriété foncière dans le Syrie centrale (Notes on Landownership in Central Syria)". Bulletin du Comité de l'Asie française (in French). 33 (309). Comité de l'Asie française: 130–137.
- Douwes, Dick (2000). The Ottomans in Syria: A History of Justice and Oppression. I.B. Tauris. ISBN 1860640311.
- Robinson, E.; Smith, E. (1841). Biblical Researches in Palestine, Mount Sinai and Arabia Petraea: A Journal of Travels in the year 1838. Vol. 3. Boston: Crocker & Brewster.
