= Halfaya massacre (2012) =

Event

- Part of the Syrian civil war
- Location: Halfaya, Hama Governorate, Ba'athist Syria
- Date: 23 December 2012
- Attack type: Massacre, Airstrike
- Deaths: 23–300
- Perpetrator: Syrian Air Force

The Halfaya massacre (Arabic: مجزرة حلفايا) occurred in the small town of Halfaya on 23 December 2012, where between 23 and 300 people were allegedly killed by bombing from warplanes. Reportedly, the civilians in the city of Halfaya were killed while queuing for bread at a bakery. Halfaya was seized by rebels the previous week as part of a campaign, to push into new territories in the 21-month-old revolt against President Bashar al-Assad. The Syrian Government agreed that many women and children were killed, but it blamed rebel fighters who it said had attacked the town.

== Conflicting claims ==
BBC correspondent Jim Muir has noted that it is not conclusive from the video that the building was a bakery. He also noted that despite initial claims by rebels that many women and children were among the dead, of the 23 people identified as dead - all of them were men. Muir added: "it is not out of the question that regime jets managed to strike a concentration of rebel fighters." He added that with independent investigation and reporting not possible though, the activist account of a bakery being hit may well be true. "The government itself made no claim of having struck rebels in that area, but it does not acknowledge the use of its air power in the struggle."

== See also ==
- Darayya massacre
