= Houla massacre =

Civilian attack on May 25, 2012 in Syria

- Part of the Syrian Civil War
- Location: 34°53′7″N 36°30′42″E; Houla, Homs, Syria
- Date: May 25, 2012; 14 years ago
- Deaths: 108, including 25 men, 34 women and 49 children (per U.N. observers)
- Injuries: 300
- Perpetrators: Shabiha and Syrian Arab Army (concluded by UN investigations)

The Houla massacre (Arabic: مجزرة الحولة) was a mass murder of civilians that took place on May 25, 2012, in the midst of the Syrian Civil War, in the town of Taldou, in the Houla Region of Syria, a string of towns northwest of Homs. According to the United Nations, 108 people were killed, including 34 women and 49 children. While a small proportion of the deaths appeared to have resulted from artillery and tank rounds used against Taldou, the U.N. later announced that most of the massacre's victims had been "summarily executed in two separate incidents". UN investigators have reported that some witnesses and survivors stated that the massacre was committed by pro-government Shabiha. In August 2012, UN investigators released a report which stated that it was likely that Ba’athist Syrian troops and Shabiha militia were responsible for the massacre, concluding that: "On the basis of available evidence, the commission has a reasonable basis to believe that the perpetrators of the deliberate killing of civilians, at both the Abdulrazzak and Al-Sayed family locations, were aligned to the Government. It rests this conclusion on its understanding of access to the crime sites, the loyalties of the victims, the security layout in the area including the position of the government’s water authority checkpoint and the consistent testimonies of victims and witnesses with direct knowledge of the events. This conclusion is bolstered by the lack of credible information supporting other possibilities."

The Ba’athist Syrian government alleged that Al-Qaeda terrorist groups were responsible for the killings, and that Houla residents were warned not to speak publicly by opposition forces. This account received support from a report published by the Frankfurter Allgemeine Zeitung, but is contested by most media coverage and by the report published by the United Nations Human Rights Council (UNHRC) in August 2012.

Channel 4 News reported that Houla residents stated that the Ba’athist Syrian military and government-hired Shabiha were the perpetrators of the massacre, as claimed by opposition groups. Townspeople described how Shabiha, who were thought to be men from Shia/Alawite villages to the south and west of Houla (Kabu and Felleh were named repeatedly) entered the town after several hours of shelling. According to one eyewitness, the killers had written Shia slogans on their foreheads (the Alawi faith is a Shia sect).

The fifteen nations of the U.N. Security Council unanimously condemned the Ba’athist Syrian government for firing heavy weapons at civilians. The U.S., U.K., and eleven other nations jointly expelled Syrian ambassadors and diplomats from their territories.

On June 1, 2012, 41 out of 47 countries in the UNHRC supported a resolution condemning "in the strongest possible terms such an outrageous use of force against the civilian population". The resolution, which blamed Ba’athist Syrian government troops and pro-government militias, instructed an expert panel to conduct an "international, transparent, independent and prompt investigation". Russia, China and Cuba voted against the resolution, with Uganda and Ecuador abstaining, and the Philippines was absent during the vote. On June 27, the UNHRC published a preliminary report on rights violations in Syria. The report noted that the commission had "yet to be afforded access to the country," which "substantially hampered the investigation, and its findings should be viewed in that light." The report states that "with the available evidence" the Commission of Inquiry (CoI) could not rule out any of three possible perpetrators, but that "while the CoI could not rule out the possibility of anti-Government fighters being responsible for the killing, it was considered unlikely." In August 2012, following continued investigations focusing on identifying the perpetrators, a report published by the UNHRC concluded there was a reasonable basis to believe the perpetrators were aligned to the Ba’athist Syrian government.

== Background ==
Al-Houla is an area mainly comprising three towns named, as given north-to-south in the UN's June report, Tal Addahab, Kafr Laha and Taldou. They report the towns have a combined population of more than 100,000 "of which the majority is Sunni Muslim," but are "ringed by Shia villages to the southeast, and Alawi villages to the southwest and the north."

Houla was a regular protest hub, even before army defectors formed the Free Syrian Army. The Syrian army had been accused of raiding and killing protesters in the Houla region before. But by May 2012 FSA or allied rebels were in general control of the area, according to both pro-government and anti-government sources. Der Spiegel was told over the winter "a unit of the Free Syrian Army took up residence (in Houla) and it has been considered liberated since then" although the state's army still controlled "roads into the town." The UN's investigators only really considered Taldou, the southernmost town in Houla, and found "opposition forces may have been in control of parts of the city, mostly in the north."

According to Al Jazeera's correspondent Hadi al-Abdallah, this FSA control of Houla is why the Syrian Army was unable to enter on May 25, and had to shell it from a distance prior to the massacre. However, the UN's June report noted "Government forces are present in Al-Houla" with "fortified checkpoints" they show on an attached map. This shows only the south end of Taldou, between rebel-held Houla and the Alawi and Shia villages. All the reported massacre sites, also labeled on that map, are in this immediate area of Taldou.

== Events ==
=== Opposition and United Nations account ===
On May 25, 2012, activists say Syrian soldiers dispersed a crowd of protesters with gunfire at a checkpoint in Taldo, a village of Houla. Shortly after, they say, armed rebels attacked the checkpoint, destroying an armored personnel carrier, and the Syrian military responded by bombarding the town with tank and artillery fire. The UNHRC's commission of Inquiry concluded (in their June report) “the protestors appear to have been fired upon or shelled by Government forces. Either in retaliation, or in a premeditated attack, anti-Government armed groups, including the FSA present in Taldou, fired upon the security forces checkpoints, probably overrunning one or two of them." They note "several people were killed in these clashes or as a result of the shelling...” (p. 7) In particular, they found the "clocktower checkpoint" located at the central roundabout in Taldou "was overrun at some point” in the day, giving militants access to Saad road (where the Abdulraaq families were killed). (p. 10) A Military Intelligence Post ways south on Main Street is marked on their map as “(likely overrun by anti-gov't forces).” (p. 21) Even in August the commission suggests that post did fall; "the checkpoint at Al-Qaws" or arches - the next post to the south - "demarcated the new front line between the opposition and Government forces." (p. 66) However, as a mobile post (soldiers in vehicles that tend to park there), the position of the Qaws post isn't as certain; their June report's map noted it "may be further south" than shown. (p. 21) That is, the small force there may have retreated to some degree.

Following the violence of the day, the Commission of Inquiry decided the FSA offensive failed to break the government's control of the massacre area via the checkpoint at the arches (Qaws), the force stationed at the National Hospital, and the fortified army post on the ridge southeast of Taldou ("Water Company"), which all remained in government hands. Therefore, "the crime scene remained in Government-controlled territory the entire time." (p. 66) Considering this, the commission found in their August report "a reasonable basis to believe that the perpetrators of the deliberate killing of civilians, at both the Abdulrazzak and Al-Sayed family locations, were aligned to the Government." (p. 67)

Witnesses said Shabiha militia forces from neighboring Alawite villages entered the town around 7 pm, shortly after nightfall. Some were wearing uniform, while others were wearing casual civilian clothing. The men proceeded to loot homes for the next five hours, killing many civilians as they moved from house to house. In some cases, gunmen herded whole families into rooms and sprayed them with bullets. Satellite images showed a large Syrian military contingent 1.5 km southeast of the massacre site.

According to the U.N. investigation, of the 108 confirmed dead, "fewer than 20" were killed by tank and artillery fire. Most of the remainder were killed in "summary executions", and "entire families were shot in their houses" in the village of Taldo. The Local Coordination Committees, a network of opposition activists inside Syria, stated that the attack by the military was preceded by mortar shelling of the town, which in itself left entire families dead. Activists stated that they had attempted to contact U.N. monitors during the night of the massacre, but the monitors refused to come.

According to the London-based Syrian Observatory for Human Rights, the massacre was perpetrated by the Syrian army, which attempted to break into Houla after the town saw many anti-government protests. Political activists said that Syrian government forces and loyalists fired heavy weapons. Other activists blamed Assad loyalists of the surrounding Alawite towns for the violence. A local man, who gave his name as Abu Bilal al-Homsi, accused Alawites in ranks of Shabiha of executions of locals in the town of Taldo, where they bayoneted civilians as a retaliation for a previous demonstration and an attack of Free Syrian Army fighters on army checkpoints in the vicinity of the towns.

In interviews with Channel 4 News, townspeople described how Shabiha from Alawite villages to the south and west of Houla (Kabu and Felleh were named repeatedly) entered the town after shelling for several hours. According to one eyewitness, the killers had written Shia slogans on their foreheads. Reporter Alex Thomson stated that he had been told many bodies were yet to be recovered, and that he had seen at least two bodies not included in the initial U.N. count.

On May 28, Human Rights Watch released a report of interviews with survivors and area activists, in which all stated that the massacre was committed by pro-government gunmen in military fatigues. However, the witnesses were unable to say whether gunmen belonged to armed forces or Shabiha. HRW was also given a list of casualties, from which 62 victims were members of the Abdel Razzak family.

Video later emerged on the Internet showing the bloodstained bodies of many children huddled on a floor in the dark, some with their skulls split open, some with their throats cut, and others knifed or shot to death. The video also featured a man's voice screaming, "These are all children! Watch, you dogs, you Arabs, you animals – look at these children, watch, just watch!" Another video showed what was said to be a mass burial of victims. The U.S. State Department later published satellite photos said to show mass graves in Syria that line up with images from the ground supplied by Syrian opposition forces.

=== Syrian government and Rainer Hermann account ===
The Syrian government stated that the massacre fit a pattern of armed groups escalating attacks prior to Security Council sessions on Syria, as in the March 15 Karm Allouz massacre in Homs. According to the Syrian government's account of the massacre provided to the United Nations on May 28, hundreds of gunmen gathered around the locations of the massacres, armed with heavy weapons including anti-tank missiles, at 2:00 pm on 25 May. The account listed as victims "several families, including children, women and elders," listed the names of the dead, and stated that armed terrorist groups had burned crops and houses and vandalized the national hospital in Taldo. Five government positions outside the affected area had also been attacked by the militia, killing three soldiers and injuring 16.

Rainer Hermann, the Middle East correspondent of the German newspaper Frankfurter Allgemeine Zeitung, has published an account of the events according to which elements opposed to the Syrian government, rather than government (or pro-government) ones, were responsible for the massacre Citing anonymous opposition sources from the area, Hermann concludes that three Syrian army checkpoints near Taldou were attacked on the evening of May 25 by more than 700 rebel gunman from Rastan, Kafr Laha and Akraba, under the leadership of Abdurazzaq Tlass and Yahya Yusuf. During and after the fighting rebel forces and Taldou residents, according to Hermann, wiped out the Sayyid and Abdarrazzaq families "who had refused to join the opposition." The Berliner Morgenpost also carried an article questioning the narrative of Syrian government responsibility, quoting anonymous eyewitness saying that the massacre victims were opponents of the revolution, and that any testimony to the contrary would result in retribution from rebels.

The Frankfurter Allgemeine Zeitung's account received attention in the international press, but is not supported by eyewitness testimony from other sources, including Channel 4 and the BBC, and was originally rejected by a report in Der Spiegel based upon interviews with Houla residents. Journalists from Der Spiegel went back to Houla in December, 2012, and were able to confirm the massacre was conducted by the shabiha.

The United Nations investigation report, released on 15 August 2012, specifically contested the alternative accounts provided by the Frankfurter Allgmeine Zeitung, stating that the paper had interviewed two witnesses also quoted in the Syrian government's report. In a speech in September 2012, U.N. High Commissioner for Human Rights Navi Pillay didn't directly accuse Syria of responsibility, but noted that government forces played a role in the Houla massacre.

== Aftermath ==
On the day of the attacks, U.N. Secretary-General Ban Ki-moon condemned the Syrian government's "unacceptable levels of violence and abuses", including use of heavy weapons on civilian populations, before the U.N. Security Council. U.N. observers visited the al-Houla on the day after the massacre, viewing the bodies of the dead in a morgue. They confirmed that at least 90 civilians were killed, including at least 32 children. Robert Mood, the U.N. mission head, described the killings as "indiscriminate and unforgivable" and said that U.N. observers could confirm "the use of small arms, machine gun[s], artillery and tanks". The U.N. report on the killings in the days following the massacre strongly implied that forces loyal to President Bashar al-Assad were responsible for the slaughter, demanding "that the Syrian Government immediately cease the use of heavy weapons in population centers."

Several towns held rallies to protest the killings. In a Damascus neighborhood women were filmed carrying papers that read "Banish the U.N. tourists" and "The Syrian regime kills us under supervision of the U.N. observers". The Free Syrian Army stated that it could no longer honor the ceasefire if the safety of civilians was not guaranteed, and that the peace plan negotiated by Kofi Annan was "dead". Members of the group stated their intent to retaliate against government forces.

On May 27, 2012, France, Germany, Great Britain and the U.S. proposed a collective statement at the U.N. condemning the Syrian government in "blistering" language, accusing it of using tank shells and artillery on a civilian population. However, Russia blocked the statement's adoption. Kuwait called for an emergency meeting of the Arab League to discuss the attacks. Later in the day, the fifteen nations that comprise U.N. Security Council unanimously condemned the Assad government for its role in the attack, though the language avoided direct blame for the deaths.

On the same day, opposition activists claimed that the Syrian government renewed shelling of Houla, and set up snipers in the area in an apparent attempt to prevent any more civilians from speaking with observers.

On May 29, 2012, Australia, Bulgaria, Canada, France, Germany, Great Britain, Italy, Spain, the Netherlands, Switzerland and the U.S. announced that they were expelling Syrian diplomats in response to the massacre. Turkey and Japan later expelled Syrian diplomats, increasing the number of nations to do so to 13. The Syrian government described the expulsions as "unprecedented hysteria", and in turn, ordered the Dutch chargé d'affaires to leave the country within 72 hours. Russia called the expulsions of Syrian diplomats "counterproductive" and insisted that a U.N. Security Council statement Sunday condemning the incident was "a strong enough signal to the Syria parties."

The following day, Denmark, the European Union, Qatar, Saudi Arabia, Turkey, and the U.S. proposed a special session of the U.N. Human Rights Council to discuss the massacre. The request was supported by 51 nations. The Russian Foreign Ministry spokesman stated that "They do not want to listen to Damascus, and that, from our point of view, does not improve matters in the current situation." Russia also called for no new U.N. Security Council action for the time being. Russian First Deputy Foreign Minister Andrei Denisov stated that: "One cannot take decisions on military operations in Syria by being guided by only emotions...the Russian position is not formed on the basis of emotions, which our respected French partners have unfortunately not escaped in the formulation of their position." Despite the U.S. State Department's earlier hope that the events in Houla might prove a "turning point in Russian thinking", Russian Deputy Foreign Minister Gennady Gatilov said: "We have always said that we are categorically against any outside interference in the Syrian conflict because this will only exacerbate the situation for both Syria and the region as a whole."

A Syrian military officer, Major Jihad Raslan, stated that he defected to the opposition after "witnessing hundreds of pro-regime militiamen" carry out the massacre. Raslan stated that defections rose sharply following the attack.

The Arab League held a special meeting on Syria following the attack, and on June 2, called on the U.N. Security Council "to take the necessary measures to protect Syrian civilians, including increasing the number of international monitors". The following day, Assad addressed Syria in a 70-minute televised address in which he denounced the Houla attacks as "massacres which even monsters would not have carried out". He stated that the attackers had been funded by "outside forces" and promised a "real war" against them.

== Reactions ==
=== Domestic ===
- (Ba'athist Syria) – Syrian government: Syrian Deputy Foreign Minister Faisal Mekdad said that "[t]here is a huge, misleading, well-planned campaign to distort the facts on the ground and mislead the people." Jihad Makdissi, spokesman for the Syrian Foreign Ministry, said in a press conference on May 27, "We completely deny responsibility for this terrorist massacre against our people". He also repeated the claim that the Syrian government was the target of a "tsunami of lies. [...] Women, children and old men were shot dead, [...] This is not the hallmark of the heroic Syrian army." As had already been claimed the day before by the state-owned news agency SANA, Makdissi also pointed to the "suspicious coincidence" that the attacks occurred in conjunction with the visit to Syria on May 28 by Kofi Annan, making them "a slap to the political process". The foreign ministry spokesman informed that a military judicial committee is investigating the massacre and that its findings would be announced in three days. He also emphasized that no tanks or artillery had entered al-Houla town, and that law enforcement units "never left their positions", being pinned down in self-defense. He also said, "The Syrian state is responsible for protecting civilians according to the constitution and Syria preserves its right to defend its citizens." Assad's government denied responsibility.
- Local Coordination Committees: "We in the Local Coordination Committees are pained by the international community's apparent blindness to the bloodshed, and believe the United Nations Security Council (UNSC) bears the responsibility for its inability to protect Syrian civilians."
- Syrian National Council: The SNC called on the U.N. Security Council to examine the massacre that had taken place in Houla. Burhan Ghalioun, former leader of the SNC, called for a "battle of Liberation" in Syria, asking Syrian civilians and FSA alike to engage in combat with the Syrian government until foreign countries intervene.
- Other: A Syrian honorary consul general in California resigned and defected because of the killings he blamed on the Syrian Government.

=== International ===
- (United Nations) – U.N. Secretary-General Ban Ki-moon and the U.N. special envoy to Syria, Kofi Annan, described the attack as an "appalling and brutal crime involving indiscriminate and disproportionate use of force [which] is a flagrant violation of international law and of the commitments of the Syrian government to cease the use of heavy weapons in population centers and violence in all its forms". They called on the Syrian government to cease the use of heavy weapons in densely populated areas, and they reiterated the call for all sides to cease violence. On May 28, U.N. Security Council unanimously condemned the killing of at least 108 people and confirmed that massacre took place amid "series of government artillery and tank shellings on a residential neighborhood", which the Syrian government denied just hours before. The UN Human Rights Commission report of August 2012 stated that the indiscriminate attacks against civilian populations and other atrocities were "state policy" and claimed Assad's forces and allied Shabiha militia were involved at the highest levels in "gross violation of international human rights".
- – Arab League Secretary-General Nabil Elaraby described the events as a "horrific crime", calling on the Syrian government to "stop the escalation of killing and violence by armed gangs and government military forces".
- – Australian Foreign Minister Bob Carr called on the Syrian government to withdraw from all military action and described the "massacre of civilians" as a "hideous and brutal crime". Senator Carr also explained that the Syrian Chargé d'affaires, Mr Jawdat Ali and another Syrian diplomat would be expelled by Australia and would be required to leave the country by May 31, 2012.
- (Bulgaria) – The Bulgarian Foreign Ministry formally expelled the Syrian ambassador and two other diplomats, and temporarily withdrew its diplomatic staff from Damascus in response to what it calls a "monstrous massacre".
- – Canadian Foreign Ministry formally expelled Syrian diplomats. Speaking to reporters on Parliament Hill the Government of Canada indicated it was "deeply offended and outraged by the actions that occurred in Syria this past weekend by the government and thugs supporting the government" in the Syrian area of Houla.
- – A spokesman for the Chinese foreign ministry said that "China feels deeply shocked by the large number of civilian casualties in Houla, and condemns in the strongest terms the cruel killings of ordinary citizens, especially women and children". However, the ruling party's official newspaper warned against intervention and argued that the international community should stick with the Annan peace plan, saying that "the Syrian question should be resolved by the Syrian people. Outside powers do not have the right to stick their hands in."
- (Egypt) – Egyptian Foreign Minister Mohammad Kamel Amr condemned the "massacre" in Syria.
- – France condemned the "massacre in Houla" and called for greater international action. Foreign Minister Laurent Fabius announced arrangements for a Paris meeting of a "Friends of Syria" group. President François Hollande stated that military intervention could not be ruled out.
- (Germany) – German Foreign Minister Guido Westerwelle said that "It is appalling that the Syrian regime does not put an end to the brutal violence against its own people ... Those responsible for this crime must be punished."
- (Hungary) – According to the Hungarian government's website, the Hungarian Foreign Ministry "most firmly condemns the murder of more than hundred persons including children in Houla, Syria. We express our most sincere condolences and deepest compassion to the families of the victims [...] The deployment of military force against civilian population in such a brutal and inhuman manner is the most ruthless violation of fundamental human rights and the earlier commitments of the Syrian leadership. We call upon the Syrian Government to immediately end violence, support the mission of U.N. observers, and fully implement Kofi Annan’s six-point plan."
- – On May 28, Iran's foreign ministry released a statement via its official media condemning the killings in Houla, stating that "[t]he killing of a number of innocent people in the area has distressed the Islamic nations." The ministry denounced the "suspect act" and urged authorities "to identify and punish those responsible." On May 30, the country's president, Mahmoud Ahmadinejad, told French TV station France 24 in an interview that "[a]ll those who carried out these murders are guilty and I hope the people responsible are punished."
- (Israel) – Israeli Prime Minister Benjamin Netanyahu, who had until the massacre refrained from any comments regarding Syria, expressed "appall at the continuous slaughter of innocent civilians by Assad's forces." He called on the international community to take action in light of "the continuous slaughter of innocent civilians" and added that "Iran and Hezbollah cannot be separated from Assad's massacre, and the world needs to take action against them as well." The Israeli President Shimon Peres, meanwhile, proclaimed that "their president, who is supposed to be the father of their nation, became their murderer". He argued that "The reactions until now have been declarations; unfortunately, declarations don't stop murders and assassinations. I think the time has come to help the Syrians achieve peace and regain their freedom."
- – Japanese government spokesman Osamu Fujimura condemned the "inhumane violence" that had occurred in Houla, and expressed sympathy for the victims. He went on to state that "It is clear that the Syrian cabinet holds part of the responsibility over that crisis [...] Japan will pressure Syria to implement the steps suggested by the U.N to put an end to violence and carry out its duties in protecting its citizens." Syria's ambassador in Tokyo was ordered to leave the country.
- (Mexico) – The Mexican Secretariat of Foreign Affairs "expressed its profound concern" for the massacre and condemned the attack in the "most energetic terms" possible. It asked for all parties in the conflict to cease the violence and respect the Kofi Annan peace plan for Syria.
- (Norway) – On May 29 the Norwegian foreign minister Jonas Gahr Støre stated, "I am deeply shocked over the massacre. The situation in Syria is very serious and incidents such as this can lead the country into full civil war."
- – On May 30, the Ministry of Foreign Affairs of Panama, announced the decision to "suspend temporarily" the diplomatic relations with the Arab Republic of Syria, based on the massive and systematic violations of human rights that the government of President Bashar al Assad inflicts against its own people, and as long as this continues the relations are indefinitely and unconditionally suspended.
- – On May 29, Romanian State Secretary Dan Petre condemned the "unqualifiable violence perpetrated at Houla" and summoned the Syrian chargé d'affaires a.i. to the Ministry of Foreign Affairs to express "profound indignation about such actions of a nature to threaten regional stability and security". The Romanian Ministry of Foreign Affairs again called for the Syrian regime to "cease urgently any forms of violence" and requested full support for the UN supervision mission in Syria. On May 30, Foreign Minister Andrei Marga recommended expelling the Syrian ambassador in Bucharest, calling the events in Houla "intolerable". The move was supported by Prime Minister Victor Ponta, who added however that Romania will maintain some diplomatic personnel in Damascus to assist Romanians who have yet to leave Syria.
- – Although before the massacre Russian rhetoric had often focused on Assad as a "reformer", Russian Foreign Minister Sergey Lavrov said in Moscow following a meeting with the British foreign minister, "The government bears the main responsibility for what is going on" and that "Any government in any country bears responsibility for the security of its citizens". Russia's reaction was considered to be a condemnation of the Syrian government. However, Lavrov also stated that the rebels shared the blame for the killings, noting that some victims had been killed at close range in a district controlled by the opposition fighters. Later, Alexei Pushkin, a foreign affairs committee chair in the Russian government, took this rhetoric further, saying that "We have very strong doubts that those people who were shot at point-blank [range] and were stabbed, that this was the action of forces loyal to President Assad... The shelling was probably...the troops of Mr Assad, but the stabbing and point-blank firing was definitely from the other side." In response to reports that Russia had shipped weapons to the Syrian port of Tartus in the same week as the massacre and American criticism of Russia's policy on Syria, Putin denied that Russia was shipping any arms to Syria "which can be used in a civilian conflict". The Russian Foreign Ministry also issued a statement saying "The tragedy in Houla showed what can be the outcome of financial aid and smuggling of modern weapons to rebels, recruitment of foreign mercenaries and flirting with various sorts of extremists."
- – Saudi Arabia condemned the massacre. Its representative at the Human Rights Council said the Kingdom is keen on the unity and integrity of Syria.
- – The Swiss Department of Foreign Affairs declared the Syrian ambassador to Switzerland (who also represents Syria in France and resides in Paris) persona non grata.
- – Turkish Foreign Minister Ahmet Davutoğlu said that Turkey "deplores and condemns in the strongest terms the massacre of at least 110 innocent civilians, including 50 children, as a result of the rocket and artillery bombardment carried out by the Syrian security forces on May 25 against the town of Houla and the mass murders committed by soldiers and 'shebbiha' militias who entered into the town afterwards." He further stated that Turkey would continue its solidarity with the Syrian people as well as the international community for the democratic transition process based on the legitimate demands of the people to end tragedy experienced in Syria before it took more innocent lives. On May 30 Turkey and Japan joined other nations and expelled senior Syrian diplomats.
- (United Arab Emirates) – The UAE called for an Arab League meeting regarding the massacre, describing the killing as "a violation to our humanity, and signifies the tragic failure of our collective Arab and international efforts to put an end to the violence against the civilians in Syria."
- (United Kingdom) – British Foreign Secretary William Hague called the massacre an "appalling crime" and stated that the British government would seek a "strong response." He blamed the Syrian government and called an emergency meeting at the U.N. security council. On June 1, Hague went further and argued that given how rapidly the situation was deteriorating, it would be wrong to "rule out any options.
- (United States) – U.S Secretary of State Hillary Clinton said that the U.S. condemned "in the strongest possible terms" the "atrocity" in Houla. She said the U.S. will work with the international community to put pressure on "Assad and his cronies," stating that their "rule by murder and fear must come to an end." She added, "Those who perpetrated this atrocity must be identified and held to account." The American government said that this act was further evidence of an "inhuman and illegitimate Syrian government" that responds to peaceful political protest with "unspeakable and inhuman brutality." On June 1, Clinton criticized Russia's actions, including its alleged "continuous supply of arms to Syria" and that in her view, Russia's stance in the conflict was not neutral as it claimed it was.
- – Vatican City released a statement saying that the "massacre causes pain and profound preoccupation to the Holy Father and the Catholic community as a whole" and asked for the "cessation" of violence.
- – Vietnam Ministry of Foreign Affairs Spokesperson Luong Thanh Nghi said: "Viet Nam strongly condemns the killings of more than 100 civilians in the town of Houla. We extend our heart-felt condolences to the families of the victims and call on parties concerned in Syria to promptly conduct full and objective investigations into the case and to strictly observe the UN six-point peace plan so that stability in Syria will soon be restored and the Syrian people will be able to build and develop their countries."

== See also ==
- Al-Qubeir massacre, 2012
- Turaymisah massacre, 2012
- Hama massacre, 1982
- List of massacres in Syria
