= Birin =

Birin بيرين
- Village
- Location in Syria
- Coordinates: 35°0′34″N 36°40′10″E
- Country: Syria
- Governorate: Hama
- District: Hama
- Subdistrict: Hirbnafsah

Population (2004)
  - Total: 2,597
- Time zone: UTC+3 (AST)
- City Qrya Pcode: C3053

Birin (Arabic: بيرين) is a Syrian village located in the Hirbnafsah Subdistrict in Hama District. According to the Syria Central Bureau of Statistics (CBS), Birin had a population of 2,597 in the 2004 census.
