= Tayzin =

Tayzin تيزين Tizin
- Village
- Location in Syria
- Coordinates: 35°7′35″N 36°39′19″E
- Country: Syria
- Governorate: Hama
- District: Hama
- Subdistrict: Hama

Population (2004)
  - Total: 5,072
- Time zone: UTC+2 (EET)
  - Summer (DST): UTC+3 (EEST)

Tayzin (Arabic: تيزين, romanized: Tīzīn, also spelled Tizin) is a village in northwestern Syria, administratively part of the Hama Governorate, located just west of Hama. Nearby localities include Matnin to the north, al-Rabiaa to the southwest, Umm al-Tuyur to the west, Kafr al-Tun to the north and Shihat Hama to the northeast. According to the Central Bureau of Statistics (CBS), Tayzin had a population of 5,072 in the 2004 census. Its inhabitants are Sunni Muslims.

== History ==
According to an Ottoman tax record from 1818, Tayzin consisted of 46 feddans, paid 4,840 qirsh in taxes to the state and another 4,725 qirsh in exactions to the mutasallim of Hama, Faraj Agha. In 1838, it was recorded as a Sunni Muslim village.

== Bibliography ==
- Douwes, Dick (2000). The Ottomans in Syria: A History of Justice and Oppression. I.B. Tauris. ISBN 1860640311.
- Robinson, E.; Smith, E. (1841). Biblical Researches in Palestine, Mount Sinai and Arabia Petraea: A Journal of Travels in the year 1838. Vol. 3. Boston: Crocker & Brewster.
