= Besirin =

Besirin بسيرين
- Village
- Location in Syria
- Coordinates: 35°1′20″N 36°44′50″E
- Country: Syria
- Governorate: Hama
- District: Hama
- Subdistrict: Hama

Population (2004)
  - Total: 4,697
- Time zone: UTC+3 (AST)
- City Qrya Pcode: C2989

Besirin (Arabic: بسيرين; also transliterated Bsirin or Bsarin) is a village in central Syria, administratively part of the Hama District of the Hama Governorate. According to the Syria Central Bureau of Statistics (CBS), Besirin had a population of 4,697 in the 2004 census. Its inhabitants are Sunni Muslims.

== History ==
Besirin was mentioned as the hometown of an Orthodox Christian scribe named 'Mattai' on three Syriac manunscripts he produced, which were dated to 1294, 1295 and 1297. In the mid-16th century, Besirin had a Christian community following the Greek Orthodox Church of Antioch. According to the Ottoman Defter record of the Hama Sanjak taken in 1594, the village was an entirely Christian settlement home to 134 households and 11 bachelors. In 1838, it was recorded as a Sunni Muslim village.

== Bibliography ==
- Brock, Sebastian (2003). "Syriac on Sinai: The Main Connections". In Ruggieri, Vincenzo; Pieralli, Luca (eds.). Eykoemia: Studi Miscellanei per il 75. di Vincenzo Poggi S.J. Rubbettino. pp. 103–118. ISBN 88-498-0730-9.
- Panchenko, Constantin Alexandrovich (2016). Arab Orthodox Christians Under the Ottomans 1516–1831. Holy Trinity Publications.
- Robinson, E.; Smith, E. (1841). Biblical Researches in Palestine, Mount Sinai and Arabia Petraea: A Journal of Travels in the year 1838. Vol. 3. Boston: Crocker & Brewster.
