= Al-Qubeir =

Al-Qubeir القبير
- Village
- Location in Syria
- Coordinates: 35°10′37″N 36°30′54″E
- Country: Syria
- Governorate: Hama
- District: Mahardah
- Subdistrict: Mahardah
- Time zone: UTC+3 (AST)

Al-Qubeir (Arabic: القبير; also referred to as Mazraat al-Qubeir, Qubair, Qubayr, al-Qubayr and al-Kubeir in various news reports) is a settlement in the Hama Governorate of Syria, near the larger village of Maarzaf. Al-Qubeir is described as a Sunni farming enclave surrounded by Alawite villages in the central province of Hama.

Al-Qubeir is around 20 kilometers (12 miles) west of the city of Hama with around 30 homes and had around 160 inhabitants. BBC News reports have described al-Qubeir as "just a few single-storey flat-roofed buildings set in the middle of golden corn fields" and as having "fewer than 30 houses".

The settlement came to global attention in 2012 as the location of the al-Qubeir massacre.
