= Al-Majdal, Hama =

Al-Majdal المجدل
- Village
- Location in Syria
- Coordinates: 35°11′49″N 36°35′21″E
- Country: Syria
- Governorate: Hama
- District: Mahardah
- Subdistrict: Mahardah

Population (2004)
  - Total: 2,393
- Time zone: UTC+3 (AST)
- City Qrya Pcode: C3444

Al-Majdal (Arabic: المجدل) is a Syrian village located in the Mahardah Subdistrict of the Mahardah District in Hama Governorate. According to the Syria Central Bureau of Statistics (CBS), al-Majdal had a population of 2,393 in the 2004 census. Its inhabitants are predominantly Sunni Muslims.

== Bibliography ==
- Robinson, E.; Smith, E. (1841). Biblical Researches in Palestine, Mount Sinai and Arabia Petraea: A Journal of Travels in the year 1838. Vol. 3. Boston: Crocker & Brewster.
