= 2023 Al-Sukhnah attack =

Islamic State massacre in Syria

- Part of the Syrian civil war
- Location: Desert near Al-Sukhnah, Homs Governorate, Syria
- Date: 17 February 2023
- Target: Farmers
- Attack type: Massacre
- Deaths: 68
- Perpetrator: Islamic State

On 17 February 2023, a group of Islamic State insurgents attacked a large group of truffle farmers and their Syrian Army escort in the desert, southwest of the town of Al-Sukhnah in Homs Governorate, Syria. At least 61 civilians and seven Syrian soldiers were killed in the attack. It was one of the deadliest attacks since the 2018 As-Suwayda attacks.

In recent years, many attacks against civilians while truffle hunting in central, north-eastern, and eastern areas of Syria had been noted. The Islamic State's remnants in the country have been known to use desert hideouts to ambush Kurdish-led forces and Syrian government troops, as well as to continue to launch attacks in neighboring Iraq, since losing much of their territory following a military campaign supported by a US-led coalition in March 2019. A similar attack on foragers in the same region on 11 February 2023 resulted in the deaths of 16 individuals, mostly civilians, with dozens reportedly kidnapped, and 25 later released.
