= Maar Daftein =

Maar Daftein معردفتين
- Village
- Location in Syria
- Coordinates: 35°8′21″N 36°42′1″E
- Country: Syria
- Governorate: Hama
- District: Hama
- Subdistrict: Hama

Population (2004)
  - Total: 2,046
- Time zone: UTC+3 (AST)
- City Qrya Pcode: C3009

Maar Daftein (Arabic: معردفتين) is a Syrian village located in the Subdistrict of the Hama District in the Hama Governorate. According to the Syria Central Bureau of Statistics (CBS), Maar Daftein had a population of 2,046 in the 2004 census. Its inhabitants are predominantly Sunni Muslims.

== History ==
According to Ottoman Tahrir Defteri records from 1594, the village was home to 38 households and 12 bachelors.

== Bibliography ==
- Robinson, E.; Smith, E. (1841). Biblical Researches in Palestine, Mount Sinai and Arabia Petraea: A Journal of Travels in the year 1838. Vol. 3. Boston: Crocker & Brewster.
