= Deir al-Salib =

Deir al-Salib دير الصليب Deir al-Sleib
- Village
- Location in Syria
- Coordinates: 35.086133°N 36.447229°E
- Country: Syria
- Governorate: Hama
- District: Masyaf
- Subdistrict: Masyaf

Population (2004)
  - Total: 2,946
- Time zone: UTC+3 (AST)

Deir al-Salib (Arabic: دير الصليب, also spelled Deir al-Sleib or Deir al-Suleib) is a village in northern Syria, administratively part of the Hama Governorate, located 37 kilometers west of Hama. Nearby localities include Bil'in to the southeast, al-Rabiaa to the east, Asilah to the northeast, Jubb Ramlah to the north, al-Laqbah and Deir Mama to the northwest, Masyaf to the west, al-Suwaydah to the southwest and Baarin and Aqrab to the south. According to the Syria Central Bureau of Statistics, Deir al-Salib had a population of 2,946 in the 2004 census. Its inhabitants are predominantly Alawites and Greek Orthodox Christians.

== History ==
In the early 19th century the Ottoman governor of Damascus, Abdullah Pasha al-Azm, granted the leaseholds of Deir al-Salib and its satellite farms to a close associate of his, Muhammad Gharib Bey al-Azm.

== Byzantine church ==
Just outside Deir al-Salib is a 5th-6th century Byzantine-era church surrounded by fig trees. It is built in the architectural style typical of the Justinian period in Syria, with its two chapels. Its stone walls have a beige and ochre color. At the right of the entrance is a baptistery which still contains a cross-shaped baptismal. The narthex of the church is preceded by a central atrium and five columns demarcate its aisles. The apse is semi-circular and on the ground floor stands a gallery reserved for women. A small mausoleum containing three sarcophagi is situated at the side of the baptistery. The sarcophagi had engraved medallions that fitted crosses.

== Bibliography ==
- Douwes, Dick (2000). The Ottomans in Syria: A History of Justice and Oppression. I.B. Tauris. ISBN 1860640311.
- Michelin (2011). Syrie Jordanie. Michelin. ISBN 978-2067154322.
- Robinson, E.; Smith, E. (1841). Biblical Researches in Palestine, Mount Sinai and Arabia Petraea: A Journal of Travels in the year 1838. Vol. 3. Boston: Crocker & Brewster.
