= Battle of Tremseh =

2012 battle during the Syrian Civil War

Coordinates: 35°16′23″N 36°30′17″E

Battle of Tremseh (2012) معركة التريمسة
- Part of the Syrian Civil War
Date	12 July 2012
Location	Tremseh, Hama, Syria
Result	Syrian government victory
Territorial changes	Syrian government forces regain control of Tremseh

Belligerents
Syrian Opposition	(Syria) Syrian Government

Commanders and leaders
Saleh al-Subaai †; Ibrahim Zuait al-Tarkawai †	(Syria) Unknown

Units involved
Free Syrian Army	Syrian Army; 15th Division; 47th Army Regiment; (Syria) Shabiha

Strength
250–300 rebels (government claim)	800 soldiers (opposition claim)

Casualties and losses
37–50 rebels killed	3 soldiers killed (government claim)
- 39 killed overall (government claim); 150 claimed killed overall, 68–103 confirmed (opposition claim)

The Battle of Tremseh (Arabic: معركة التريمسة) was a military confrontation between the Syrian Army and the Free Syrian Army in Tremseh, Syria, in the late hours of 12 July 2012 during the Syrian Civil War leading to the reported death of dozens of rebels, and an unknown number of civilians. On 14 July 2012, the UN observer mission issued a statement, based on the investigation by its team that went to the town, that the Syrian military mainly targeted the homes of rebels and activists, in what the BBC said was a contradiction of the initial opposition claims of a civilian massacre. They said that the number of casualties was unclear and added that they intend to return to the town to continue their investigation.

On 16 July 2012, the Free Syrian Army backtracked on their initial death toll of 200, saying it had been overblown because many of the wounded were counted as dead, and reduced the list of those confirmed killed to 68–103 names. But still, pro-rebel activist Abu Adnan continued to claim 150 died, with the rest of the bodies allegedly being unidentifiable or stolen by the military during their assault.

== Events ==
A Syrian Army convoy was ambushed by rebels near Hama, which led to a counter-attack by the Syrian Army, and reports suggested government troops were trying to take back the town from rebel forces. According to opposition activists, Tremseh was surrounded by government tanks and artillery, after which the Syrian Army launched a full-scale attack against the opposition Free Syrian Army inside the town. Tanks entered Tremseh after government forces had shelled the town continuously from 5 a.m. until noon. Syrian Army forces, whose numbers were bolstered by the pro-government militias called "Shabeha", accompanied the tanks into Tremseh. The opposition claimed that, as the government forces rained artillery rounds into the town, a number of village residents fled their houses into the streets, where many of them were shot dead by the government militias. Major General Robert Mood, head of the U.N. Supervision Mission in Syria, said in Damascus that a U.N. team had observed the fighting from three or four miles outside Tremseh, adding that it involved "mechanized units, indirect fire as well as helicopters."

According to sources close to the government, the attack on Tremseh was part of a larger offensive decided by the Syrian government, with the aim to crush all rebel resistance in the next two months. One police agent successfully infiltrated an Idlib armed group and was able to notify the military about the rebels who were gathering at Tremseh and preparing the convoy attack.

The Local Coordination Committees in Hama and the Syrian Observatory for Human Rights reported that the Syrian Army and the Shabiha, backed by tanks and attack helicopters, entered the town of Tremseh after a rebel withdrawal, and summarily executed over a hundred people. Initial reports placed the death toll at more than 100. Later reports said the death toll of the massacre to be between 220 and 250, when over 150 dead bodies were found in the local mosque after Syrian Army forces left. The people in the mosque, who tried to find shelter there, apparently died when the building was shelled and then collapsed on them. At one point, the LCC claimed a figure of 280 dead and 200 missing.

A number of the dead were reportedly rebels, which was confirmed by the opposition group SOHR by stating that dozens of the dead were rebel fighters, including Lieutenant Ibrahim Zuait al-Tarkawai. Jaafar, a Sham News Network opposition activist, said that only seven civilians and 30 rebels were killed. This was in line with the military's claim of killing a "big number of terrorists". SOHR put the overall death toll at 150, with only 40 confirmed dead by name thus far. A villager who managed to escape the area said, on condition of anonymity, that Alawite militiamen entered after Syrian rebels retreated from the area and committed the massacre. The survivor said that houses and mosques were set ablaze by the government forces.

The Syrian government denied responsibility for killing civilians, instead claiming that the massacre was perpetrated by "armed gangs" and that three members of the security forces were killed fighting them. The government also gave a lower figure of 50 civilians being killed. The Syrian government subsequently retracted the claim and denied that any civilians died at all, saying that they "had carried out a special operation against rebel forces killing many rebels and capturing dozens of others," adding that no civilians were killed. According to the Syrian government, residents called security forces for help after the "terrorist groups" raided the neighborhood. The security forces then arrested some of the members of the rebel groups and confiscated their weapons. A military source quoted by the state-run Syrian Arab News Agency said an operation by armed forces destroyed "terrorists' dens," killed many of the people they found there, and led to the arrests of scores more." The account added, "Armed forces successfully dealt with the terrorists without casualties taking place among the citizens. They searched into the terrorists' dens where they found the dead bodies of a number of citizens who had been abducted and killed by the terrorist groups."

Kofi Annan, the UN special envoy, accused the Syrian government of using heavy weapons and helicopters in the village. Jihad Makdissi, spokesman for Syria's Foreign Ministry, denied that heavy weapons were used in the village and said the heaviest weapon used was an RPG.

A local opposition member, Fadi Sameh, was quoted as saying, "It appears that Alawite militiamen (Shabiha) from surrounding villages descended on Turaymisah after its rebel defenders pulled out, and started killing the people. Whole houses have been destroyed and burned from the shelling."

Another was quoted as saying, "Around 6:00 am of Thursday morning, Assad forces surrounded the village with heavy weaponry and tanks, more than 800 soldiers of Assad forces were in the mission, after couple of hours, they started arbitrary artillery shelling on the village. People fled their home to seek shelters in school and the mosque. Assad forces shelled the school and the mosque causing collapses in the buildings which resulted in tens of deaths. Shabiha from the surrounding villages came to support Assad forces and to kill more of the village people, which escalate the number of victims in this massacre."

The UN observer mission head, Robert Mood, said that the Syrian Army was still conducting assaults with heavy weapons around the town the following day.

By the evening of 13 July 2012, the opposition Syrian National Council claimed a new total figure of 305 killed. However, at the same time, other opposition activists backed away from their earlier estimates of over 200 dead. One local activist stated that he had confirmed 74 deaths, but had only 20 names. Another provided a list of 103 names. Others also said the death toll may have been less but was certainly over 100.

A group of UN-observers had entered Tremseh on 14 July 2012 with a convoy of around 11 vehicles on reconnaissance mission. According to a local activist in Hama province they inspected bombed places and where there were traces of blood. The UN observers found evidence of an attack, including a burned school, damaged houses, and proof that artillery, mortars and small arms were used according spokeswoman for the head of the U.N. Supervising Mission in Syria, Sausan Ghosheh. "The attack ... appeared targeted at specific groups and houses, mainly of army defectors and activists. There were pools of blood and blood spatters in rooms of several homes together with bullet cases," Ghosheh said in a statement. On the same day the head of the UN monitoring mission, Major General Robert Mood, told reporters in Damascus that a group of observers, deployed few kilometres from Tremseh, confirmed the use of heavy weaponry and attack helicopters in Tremseh and thereby implicated the Syrian government according to Al Jazeera.

On 14 July 2012, the facts over the event remained unclear with new details emerging that would indicate that what was called a massacre was more of a battle between the military and opposition fighters that ended in a defeat for the rebels. Videos, televised confessions of captured fighters and reports from non-local activists backed up this version. The videos of the victims that have emerged showed mostly young men of fighting age. Another video was said to show a group of rebel reinforcements heading to Tremseh, all of them armed young men in civilian clothes. A team of UN observers was sent to the town to investigate. It was pointed out that while previous massacres were usually followed by long lists of names and videos of killed civilians emerging at the same time, as well as corroboration by UN observers who would fault the Syrian Army, this was not so in this case. Some opposition groups still claimed a large number of civilian deaths happened while others put the death toll at far less and stated most were rebels. The opposition activist group SOHR stated that it had been able to confirm only 103 deaths, 90 percent of them young men, and the group's director, Rami Abdul-Rahman, said that the majority of people killed in Tremseh were either rebel fighters from the town or from surrounding towns. Later, he was more precise, stating that at least 50 rebels were killed. The opposition activist group VDC confirmed, by this point, the names of only 63 people to have been killed.

Late on 14 July, the UN observer mission issued a statement, based on the investigation by its team that went to the town, that the Syrian military mainly targeted the homes of rebels and activists. Opposition activists gave a new revised figure of 103 to 152 dead but stated they were expecting the number to rise because, according to them, hundreds of people were unaccounted for and locals believed many bodies remained in the fields that were close to army checkpoints or were disposed of into the Orontes River. The UN observers could not immediately determine the total number of casualties and announced they would return to the area the next day to further investigate.

On 15 July, the government stated that 37 of the dead were rebels and only two were civilians. Syrian foreign ministry spokesman Jihad Makdissi told a news conference in Damascus that no helicopters, aircraft or armoured tanks were used in the attack – only troop carriers and small arms, including rocket-propelled grenades. "It was not a massacre but a response by regular military forces against heavily armed groups that do not want a political solution," Mr Makdissi said. Meanwhile, the International Committee of the Red Cross declared it sees the fighting in Syria as a "non-international armed conflict", which is the technical term for civil war. This would have the effect that, from that point on, all those fighting in Syria are officially subject to the Geneva Conventions and could end up at a war crimes tribunal if they disobeyed them.

On 16 July, rebels gave a revised death toll of approximately 150. They said higher numbers in the past were because of mistakenly counting the wounded as dead, and that only 68 bodies were present due to others being "stolen" by the Syrian Army. By 15 July, they had the names of 103 of those who died, and about 30 of the bodies were too badly burnt to be identified. 5 children and 1 woman were amongst those killed, the rest were all males. Free Syrian Army (FSA) leader, Saleh al-Subaai, was also confirmed killed in the battle.

== International reactions ==
Before the UN observer mission's investigation contradicted the opposition claims of a civilian massacre, a number of countries condemned the alleged killings.

- United Nations – U.N Secretary-General Ban Ki-moon condemned the Syrian Army attack, stating that he is "outraged" by reports of horrific mass killings. UN-Arab League peace envoy Kofi Annan also condemned the attack and stated that Syrian forces had used heavy weaponry.
- Canada – Minister of Foreign Affairs John Baird noted Canada was appalled by the killings, and encouraged further action from the international community. "Canada urges all members of the UN Security Council to come to agreement on a resolution that will impose tough, binding economic sanctions against the regime."
- France – The French Foreign Ministry spokesman Bernard Valero argued that the Syrian government must take the "first step towards a cessation of violence" as evidenced by the tragedy.
- Iraq – Iraqi prime minister Nouri al-Maliki condemned the killings and described the deaths as an "ugly massacre". In a statement on his official website he said "The ugly massacre that took place in Tremseh town, in Hama province, provokes feelings of concern and condemnation. This reprehensible crime, which we condemn strongly ... should be an additional incentive for everyone to abandon the methods of violence, murder, revenge and terrorism in solving problems."
- Malta – Malta Foreign Minister Tonio Borg strongly condemned the reported massacre in Tremseh.
- People's Republic of China – China strongly condemned the reported massacre. Liu Weimin, spokesman of Chinese Foreign Ministry said "China has always strongly denounced actions that harm innocent civilians. We hope the concerned Syrian parties should take concrete measures and fulfill their commitment to cease violence as soon as possible".
- Russia – Russian Foreign Ministry said the massacre served the interests of those who supported a sectarian conflict in Syria, but did not directly apportion blame.
- Turkey – Turkish Foreign Ministry issued a statement condemning the massacre saying "This is another example of Syrian regime's attacks and massacres on its own people. We strongly condemn and curse the killing of nearly 200 innocent civilians, most of them women and children". The statement said the massacre had shown that the Syrian government had lost all legitimacy and it had to be stopped at once for the sake of regional and international security. The statement also urged Security Council "to take necessary steps immediately".
- United Kingdom – UK's Foreign Secretary William Hague condemned the alleged massacre in Tremseh as "shocking and appalling".
- USA – US Secretary of State Hillary Clinton issued a press release and stated that she was deeply saddened and outraged to learn of reports of yet another massacre committed by the Syrian government in Turaymisah. She added: "Credible reports indicate that this unconscionable act was carried out by artillery, tanks, and helicopters – indisputable evidence that the regime deliberately murdered innocent civilians. Syria cannot be peaceful, stable, or democratic until Assad goes and a political transition begins."
