= Al-Qubeir massacre =

2012 massacre

- Part of the Syrian civil war
- Location: 35°10′37″N 36°30′54″E; Al-Qubeir, Hama, Syria
- Date: 6 June 2012
- Attack type: Massacre
- Deaths: 55–78
- Perpetrators: Shabiha (eye witnesses); Syrian opposition (regime claim)

The Al-Qubeir massacre (Arabic: مجزرة القبير), also known as the Hama massacre, occurred in the small village of Al-Qubeir near Hama, Syria, on 6 June 2012 during the country's ongoing civil conflict. Al-Qubeir is described as a Sunni farming settlement surrounded by Alawite villages in the central province of Hama. According to preliminary evidence, troops had surrounded the village which was followed by pro-government Shabiha militia entering the village and killing civilians with "barbarity," UN Secretary-General Ban Ki-moon told the UN Security Council.

Activists, and witnesses stated that scores of civilians, had been killed by Shabiha militia and security forces, while the Syrian government said that nine people had been killed by "terrorists". It was further claimed by the Syrian National Council that 35 of the people killed were from the same Al Yatim family and more than half of them were women and children.

== Events ==
Activists reported that the village was initially shelled by the security forces, before the Shabiha moved in to kill by shooting at close range and by stabbing. A government statement, reported by Syrian state TV, denied responsibility: "What a few media have reported on what happened in Al-Qubeir, in the Hama region, is completely false." State TV had previously stated that the security forces were engaged in an assault on an "armed terrorist stronghold" in the village.

At the time that the reports were issued, the UN Department of Peacekeeping Operations were unable to verify the reports – monitors stated they would be heading to the area to investigate "as soon as dawn breaks". Later, the head of the UN observer mission said that Syrian government soldiers prevented the observers from entering the village. Ban Ki-moon told the UN General Assembly that observers attempting to reach the site of the massacre were shot at with light arms.

The UN monitors eventually reached the village on 8 June 2012. BBC journalist Paul Danahar, travelling with the UN, spoke of the stench of burnt flesh and blood-splattered buildings. The UN observers did not find bodies. Local people told them that after the Alawite militia had carried out the massacre others had arrived and taken the bodies away.

The Syrian Government appointed its own commission to investigate, but the commission head, Talal Houshan, defected to the opposition, accusing the regime and Shabiha of murdering women and children in a video posted on YouTube.

== Casualty estimates ==
Casualty estimates vary. In an early report activists stated that at least 78 people were killed. The opposition said that 100 people had been killed in the massacre; Syrian National Council spokesperson Mohammed Sermini said, "We have 100 deaths in the village of Al-Qubeir, among them 20 women and 20 children." The Syrian Observatory for Human Rights estimated the number of dead to be 87. Two days later, the SNC revised their death toll to 78, while SOHR revised it to at least 55. Syrian state media gave a figure of nine. When describing the massacre, UN Secretary-General Ban Ki-moon reported how some of the victims were burned, while others were slashed with knives.

== Reactions ==
=== Domestic ===
- Syria – Syria's Permanent Representative to the UN, Dr. Bashar Jaafari, emphasized that the Syrian government is ready to do everything in its power to make the mission of the UN envoy a success, indicating that Syria has offered all necessary facilitations for Annan's plan and the UN observer mission. He further said that killing innocent civilians in Al-Qubeir took place five hours before any clashes happened, adding that the images broadcast by al Jazeera and al Arabia are not those of the massacre victims. The Syrian government blamed "terrorists" for the massacre.

=== International ===
- United Nations – Secretary-General Ban Ki-moon condemned the reported massacre as "shocking and sickening", and an "unspeakable barbarity". He stated that the Assad government had "lost its fundamental humanity" and no longer has any legitimacy.
- European Union – High Representative of the Union for Foreign Affairs and Security Policy Catherine Ashton condemned the attacks.
- Australia – Prime Minister Julia Gillard condemned the massacre and said, "We will continue to work with the rest of the world to put pressure on Syria to cease the violence."
- Germany – Government spokesman Steffen Seibert said that Germany was "horrified" by the latest Syrian massacre and urged Russia to throw its support behind a tougher condemnation of Assad's government by the United Nations Security Council.
- Italy – Italy warned that Assad's policies risk creating "genocide" unless swift action to stop him is realized.
- Lebanon – Lebanon's Future bloc leader MP Fouad Siniora condemned the massacre and called on Russia to reconsider its stance on the Syrian crisis.
- Malta – Foreign Minister Tonio Borg condemning the attacks, said that the Syrian government is not willing to stop the violence.
- People's Republic of China – Liu Weimin, the foreign ministry spokesman said Beijing "strongly condemns the deaths of innocent civilians and calls for the perpetrators to be punished".
- Russia – Alexei Pushkov, the head of the foreign-affairs committee in the State Duma, the lower house of Russian parliament, said in a telephone interview to Bloomberg that "There’s no proof of either the involvement of pro-government or opposition forces".
- Saudi Arabia – Abdullatif Salam, Deputy Chief of the Saudi Mission at the United Nations, addressing the UN General Assembly, asked the world community to shoulder its responsibilities to end bloodshed in Syria.
- Turkey – Prime Minister Recep Tayyip Erdoğan emphasized that Turkey will never remain silent in the face of mass killings in Syria, recalling the mass killings in a farmland in Hama province and that Assad will sooner or later leave the country and he is now preparing his end. He also added that "you already know which countries are helping him."
- United Kingdom – Prime Minister David Cameron called the killings "brutal and sickening" and stated that his government would continue to seek international action against Syria.
- United States – Secretary of State Hillary Clinton described the violence as "unconscionable".

== See also ==
- Houla massacre
- Hama massacre (1981)
- Hama massacre (1982)
- List of massacres in Syria
