= Tell Qartal =

Tell Qartal تل قرطل
- Village
- Location in Syria
- Coordinates: 35°0′37″N 36°46′52″E
- Country: Syria
- Governorate: Hama
- District: Hama
- Subdistrict: Hama

Population (2004)
  - Total: 2,079
- Time zone: UTC+3 (AST)
- City Qrya Pcode: C2995

Tell Qartal (Arabic: تل قرطل) is a Syrian village located in the Subdistrict of the Hama District in the Hama Governorate. According to the Syria Central Bureau of Statistics (CBS), Tell Qartal had a population of 2,079 in the 2004 census. Its inhabitants are predominantly Sunni Muslims.

== Bibliography ==
- Robinson, E.; Smith, E. (1841). Biblical Researches in Palestine, Mount Sinai and Arabia Petraea: A Journal of Travels in the year 1838. Vol. 3. Boston: Crocker & Brewster.
