= Al-Jinan =

Jinan الجنان
- Village
- Location in Syria
- Coordinates: 35°4′58″N 36°50′27″E
- Country: Syria
- Governorate: Hama
- District: Hama
- Subdistrict: Hama

Population (2004)
  - Total: 3,860
- Time zone: UTC+3 (AST)
- City Qrya Pcode: C2972

Jinan (Arabic: الجنان, romanized: al-Jinān) is a village in central Syria, administratively part of the Hama Governorate. It is located 12 kilometers (7.5 mi) east of Hama and 25 kilometers (16 mi) west of Salamiyah.

According to the Syria Central Bureau of Statistics (CBS), Jinan had a population of 3,860 in the 2004 census. Its inhabitants are Sunni Muslim Arabs. As of 2009, they mainly relied economically on agriculture, particularly vegetables, especially dried mallow (khubbayza), as well as pomegranates and grapes. The other main trade in the village was motorcycle repair.

== History ==
Jinan was abandoned or no longer cultivated by 1800 and this state of affairs was again acknoweldged in an 1805 Ottoman government record. That year, the village was granted by the governor Abdullah Pasha al-Azm to his relative Nasuh Pasha al-Azm as a malikane (lifetime tax farm). By 1829, it had been repopulated and was listed as a tax-paying village. The scholar Eli Smith counted Jinan as the only inhabited place in the district of Salamiyah in 1838, noting its inhabitants to be Sunni Muslims. That year, the village had been settled by formerly sheepherding Bedouins.

== Bibliography ==
- Douwes, Dick; Lewis, Norman N. (1992). "Taxation and Agriculture in the Hama District, 1800–1831: New Material from the Records of the Religious Court". In Philipp, Thomas (ed.). The Syrian Land in the 18th and 19th Centuries. Stuttgart: Franz Steiner. pp. 261–284. ISBN 3-515-05685-8.
- Douwes, Dick (2000). The Ottomans in Syria: A History of Justice and Oppression. I.B. Tauris. ISBN 1860640311.
