= Maarin al-Jabal =

Maarin al-Jabal معرين الجبل
- Village
- Location in Syria
- Coordinates: 35°2′55″N 36°45′48″E
- Country: Syria
- Governorate: Hama
- District: Hama District
- Subdistrict: Hama Nahiyah

Population (2004)
  - Total: 3,710
- Time zone: UTC+3 (AST)
- City Qrya Pcode: C3011

Maarin al-Jabal (Arabic: معرين الجبل) is a Syrian village located in the Subdistrict of the Hama District in the Hama Governorate. According to the Syria Central Bureau of Statistics (CBS), Maarin al-Jabal had a population of 3,710 in the 2004 census. Its inhabitants are predominantly Sunni Muslims.

== Bibliography ==
- Robinson, E.; Smith, E. (1841). Biblical Researches in Palestine, Mount Sinai and Arabia Petraea: A Journal of Travels in the year 1838. Vol. 3. Boston: Crocker & Brewster.
