= Al-Muah =

Al-Mu'ah الموعة
- Village
- Location in Syria
- Coordinates: 35°1′36″N 36°34′32″E
- Country: Syria
- Governorate: Hama
- District: Hama
- Subdistrict: Hirbnafsah

Population (2004)
  - Total: 3,776
- Time zone: UTC+3 (AST)
- City Qrya Pcode: C3056

Al-Mu'ah (Arabic: الموعة) is a Syrian village located in the Hirbnafsah Subdistrict in Hama District. According to the Syria Central Bureau of Statistics (CBS), al-Mu'ah had a population of 3,776 in the 2004 census. Its inhabitants are predominantly Sunni Muslims.

== Bibliography ==
- Robinson, E.; Smith, E. (1841). Biblical Researches in Palestine, Mount Sinai and Arabia Petraea: A Journal of Travels in the year 1838. Vol. 3. Boston: Crocker & Brewster.
