= Maharda Subdistrict =

Maharda Subdistrict ناحية مركز محردة
- Subdistrict (nahiyah)
- Location in Hama Governorate

- Location in Syria
- Country: Syria
- Governorate: Hama
- District: Maharda District

Population (2004)
  - Total: 80,165
- Time zone: UTC+2 (EET)
  - Summer (DST): UTC+3 (EEST)
- Nahya pcod: SY050500

Maharda Subdistrict (Arabic: ناحية مركز محردة) is a Syrian nahiyah (Subdistrict) located in Maharda District in Hama Governorate. According to the Syria Central Bureau of Statistics (CBS), Mhardeh Subdistrict had a population of 80,165 in the 2004 census.
