= Northern al-Bab offensive (September 2016) =

Military operation

- Part of the Turkish military intervention in Syria (August 2016–March 2017) and the Syrian Civil War
- Map of the wider Turkish-led operations in northern Aleppo and the wider campaigns in Aleppo Syrian Armed Forces & Allied Groups Syrian Democratic Forces Islamic State of Iraq and the Levant Syrian opposition and Turkish troops in Northern Syria
Date	16–27 September 2016 (1 week and 4 days)
Location	Al-Bab District, Aleppo Governorate, Syria
Status	Turkish and SNA victory: FSA groups/Turkish capture 10 villages (16–20 Sep.); ISIL captures 20+ villages (21–23 Sep.); FSA groups/Turkish capture 15 villages (23–27 Sep.)

Belligerents
Turkey (Syrian opposition) Syrian Opposition: Free Syrian Army Support: United States	Islamic State

Commanders and leaders
(Turkey) Lt. Gen. Zekai Aksakallı (Operations chief commander) (Turkey) Lt. Gen. İsmail Metin Temel (Second Army commander) (Syrian opposition) Col. Ahmed Othman (Sultan Murad Division commander) (Syrian opposition) Fahim Issa (Sultan Murad Division commander) (Syrian opposition) Ali Şeyh Salih (Sultan Murad Division field commander) (Syrian opposition) Muhammad al-Gabi (Liberation Army commander) (Syrian opposition) Mohammad Abu Ibrahim (Syrian opposition) Mustafa Sejari (Al-Moutasem Brigade political leader) (Syrian opposition) Abdel Karim Alyato † (13th Division commander); Mahmoud Abu Hamza (Descendants of Saladin Brigade commander); Capt. Abdel Salam Abdel Razaq (Nour al-Din al-Zenki Movement commander); Capt. Mohammed Abu Mustafa (Sham Legion commander); Abu Jafer (Brigade of Conquest commander)	Unknown

Units involved
(Turkey) Turkish Armed Forces: Turkish Land Forces; Turkish Air Force; Special Forces; (Syrian opposition) Hawar Kilis Operations Room: Sultan Murad Division; Descendants of Saladin Brigade; (Syrian opposition) Hamza Division; (Syrian opposition) Levant Front; Al-Moutasem Brigade; (Syrian opposition) Fastaqim Union; Sham Legion; (Syrian opposition) Akhtarin Military Council (from 3 October 2016); (Syrian opposition) Free Idlib Army; (Syrian opposition) 13th Division; (Syrian opposition) Liberation Army; (Syrian opposition) Liberation Brigade (Leader and 50 defectors, rest still in the SDF); (Syrian opposition) First Division of Aleppo; Brigade of Conquest; Other Syrian rebels Nour al-Din al-Zenki Movement Ahrar al-Sham	Unknown

Strength
(Turkey) 500+ soldiers (Syrian opposition) 1,500+ rebels (United States) 40 military advisors	3,000+ militants

Casualties and losses
8 rebels and 2 Turkish soldiers killed (per Turkey & SOHR) ~60 rebels and 2 Turkish soldiers killed, 1 Turkish tank destroyed (ISIL claim)	45+ killed (per Turkey)

The northern al-Bab offensive (September 2016) was a military offensive and part of the third phase of Operation Euphrates Shield launched by the Turkish Armed Forces and factions from the Free Syrian Army and allied groups, with the goal of capturing the city of al-Bab located north of Aleppo from the Islamic State of Iraq and the Levant (ISIL).

== Preparations ==
In early September 2016, rebel and Turkish forces reached within 20 kilometers of al-Bab after capturing a large area from al-Rai to Jarabulus from the ISIL. The rebels then announced their goal of capturing al-Bab.

Two days later, ISIL evacuated its headquarters in al-Bab and dozens of vehicles carrying militants and weapons drove to the town of Khafsa to the east.

On 14 September, a large number of rebels, Turkish troops, and military vehicles gathered north of al-Bab as the Turkish Air Force and artillery bombed ISIL positions near the city.

== The offensive ==
On 16 September, the Turkish Armed Forces and FSA factions officially announced the beginning of the third phase of Operation Euphrates Shield. The FSA vowed to continue until they reach the government-held Kuweires Military Airbase. Dozens of US special forces would also support the operation. On 17 September, pro-Syrian opposition media had claimed the Turkish-backed rebels had captured the Tal Homs hilltop near al-Rai. On the same day, fighters of ISIL started evacuating their families from al-Bab.

On 18 September, Turkish-backed rebels captured six villages. Meanwhile, the ISIL-affiliated Amaq News Agency claimed that around 60 rebels were killed in Jakkah and Talghar, mostly due to mines when they rushed through these areas. Amaq also claimed that ISIL had destroyed a Turkish tank near Jakkah using a guided missile. By 19 September, the number of villages captured by the rebels had risen to nine.

On 20 September, ISIL reportedly seized six villages in a counter-attack near al-Rai, reaching the village of al-Hadabat, east of the town. In turn, the rebels took control of two other villages near al-Rai. On 21 and 22 September, the rebels recaptured three villages from ISIL, before losing them again hours later.

As of 22 September, the rebel offensive towards al-Bab had stalled due to the ISIL counter-attack. Meanwhile, ISIL fired two rockets on Kilis in Turkey, leaving eight civilians injured. The Turkish military later stated that it had carried out airstrikes as well as shelling against the positions from where the rockets were fired, resulting in the deaths of 40 militants.

By 23 September, ISIL had captured more than 20 villages from the rebels. Due to the rebel losses, the offensive was halted and the third phase of the Turkish operation was put on hold. During the ISIL advance east of al-Rai, a pro-rebel source claimed the FSA captured a village west of the town.

Between 24 and 27 September, pro-rebel sources claimed the rebels had seized 11 villages from ISIL, including 10 of those previously lost, as well as the electrical grid of Weqfan. A pro-government source also confirmed the rebels took control of three other villages, two of which they also previously lost.

On 27 September, three Turkish soldiers were injured in an attack conducted by ISIL using a bomb-laden drone while the Turkish military shelled 30 ISIL targets.

In late September, the Al-Monitor assessed, taking into account the ISIL recapture of a number of Turkmen villages south of Jarablus from the FSA, that the Euphrates Shield operation could not be sustained without Turkish ground troops, pointing to existing doubts since the very start. It stated the rebel forces were inadequate and the biggest weakness of the operation, which could possibly lead to larger numbers of Turkish troops coming into Syria and into a "quagmire".

== Aftermath ==
In the immediate aftermath of the aborted offensive towards al-Bab, the rebels and Turkey launched a new offensive towards the ISIL-held town of Dabiq.

== See also ==
- Western al-Bab offensive (September 2016)
- Manbij offensive (2016)
- Battle of al-Rai (August 2016)
