= Western al-Bab offensive (October–November 2016) =

Military confrontation in Syria

- Part of the Syrian Civil War, the Rojava–Islamist conflict, and the Turkish military intervention in Syria
- Map of the wider Turkish-led operations and the wider campaigns in northern Aleppo
Date	18 October – 3 November 2016 (2 weeks and 2 days)
Location	Azaz District, Aleppo Governorate
Status	Major advances by SNA, SDF and Army over ISIL; SDF repels SNA assault: 36 villages captured from ISIL by the SNA (16), SDF (14) and Army (6); Army also captures the Muslamiyah Cement Factory and Aleppo Infantry College; SDF repels a number of SNA assaults on its frontline and captures a number of villages from the rebels; ISIL recaptured parts of Akhtarin and 17 surrounding villages and hills from the SNA

Belligerents
Syrian Democratic Forces: Al-Bab Military Council; (Syria) Syrian Arab Republic: Syrian Armed Forces (since 29 October); Support: Russia	Islamic State	Turkey (Syrian opposition) Syrian National Army

Commanders and leaders
Ahmed Sultan (Army of Revolutionaries deputy commander); Abu Steyf (Jabhat al-Akrad commander); Maj. Khaled Najib (Northern Democratic Brigade commander); Abu Rami al-Homsi † (Homs Commandos Brigade general commander)	Unknown	(Turkey) Lt. Gen. Zekai Aksakallı (Operations chief commander) (Turkey) Lt. Gen. İsmail Metin Temel (Second Army commander) (Syrian opposition) Col. Ahmed Othman (Sultan Murad Division commander) (Syrian opposition) Sayf Bulad (Hamza Division commander) (Syrian opposition) Abu Jinan † (Levant Front commander) (Syrian opposition) Fadel Lahmouni (WIA) (Northern Storm Brigade commander) (Syrian opposition) Muhammad al-Gabi (DOW) (Liberation Army commander); Abdul Salam Abed (Nour al-Din al-Zenki Movement commander) (Syrian opposition) Abu Mahmoud der Jamal (First Regiment commander)

Units involved
Syrian Democratic Forces; Army of Revolutionaries; Homs Commandos Brigade; Jabhat al-Akrad; Shahba Women's Front; Tel Rifaat Revolutionaries Battalion; Tribal Forces; (Syrian opposition) Northern Democratic Brigade; People's Protection Units; Women's Protection Units; Syrian Armed Forces (since 29 October): Syrian Army; Syrian Arab Air Force	Unknown	(Turkey) Turkish Armed Forces; Turkish Land Forces; 2nd Army; Turkish Air Force; Special Forces; (Syrian opposition) Hawar Kilis Operations Room; Victory Bloc; Hamza Division; Northern Thunder Brigade; Al-Moutasem Brigade; Sultan Murad Division; Levant Front; Northern Storm Brigade; Descendants of Saladin Brigade; Liberation Army; Sham Legion; Nour al-Din al-Zenki Movement; Conquest Brigade; First Regiment; Freemen of the East; Ahrar al-Sham

Strength
Unknown	3,000+ militants	Unknown

Casualties and losses
60+ killed (per SOHR and SDF); 172–212 killed (per Turkey)	37+ killed	85–90 SNA and 4 Turkish soldiers killed (per SOHR, Inside Source and Turkey)^{[*]}
- 4 civilians, 1 journalist killed
- ^{*} No confirmation of soldier deaths by Turkey.

The western al-Bab offensive (October–November 2016) was a multi-sided military confrontation between the Syrian Army, the Syrian Democratic Forces (SDF) (including some allied Free Syrian Army (FSA) factions), other (Turkey-backed) FSA factions, and the Islamic State of Iraq and the Levant in the countryside of northwestern Aleppo Governorate, south of the towns of Mare' and Tel Rifaat.

== Background ==
On 18 October, the Hamza Division's Northern Thunder Brigade issued an ultimatum to the "PKK" and the Army of Revolutionaries, warning them to leave Tell Rifaat within 48 hours, after which they would attack the town.

== The offensive ==
=== First week ===
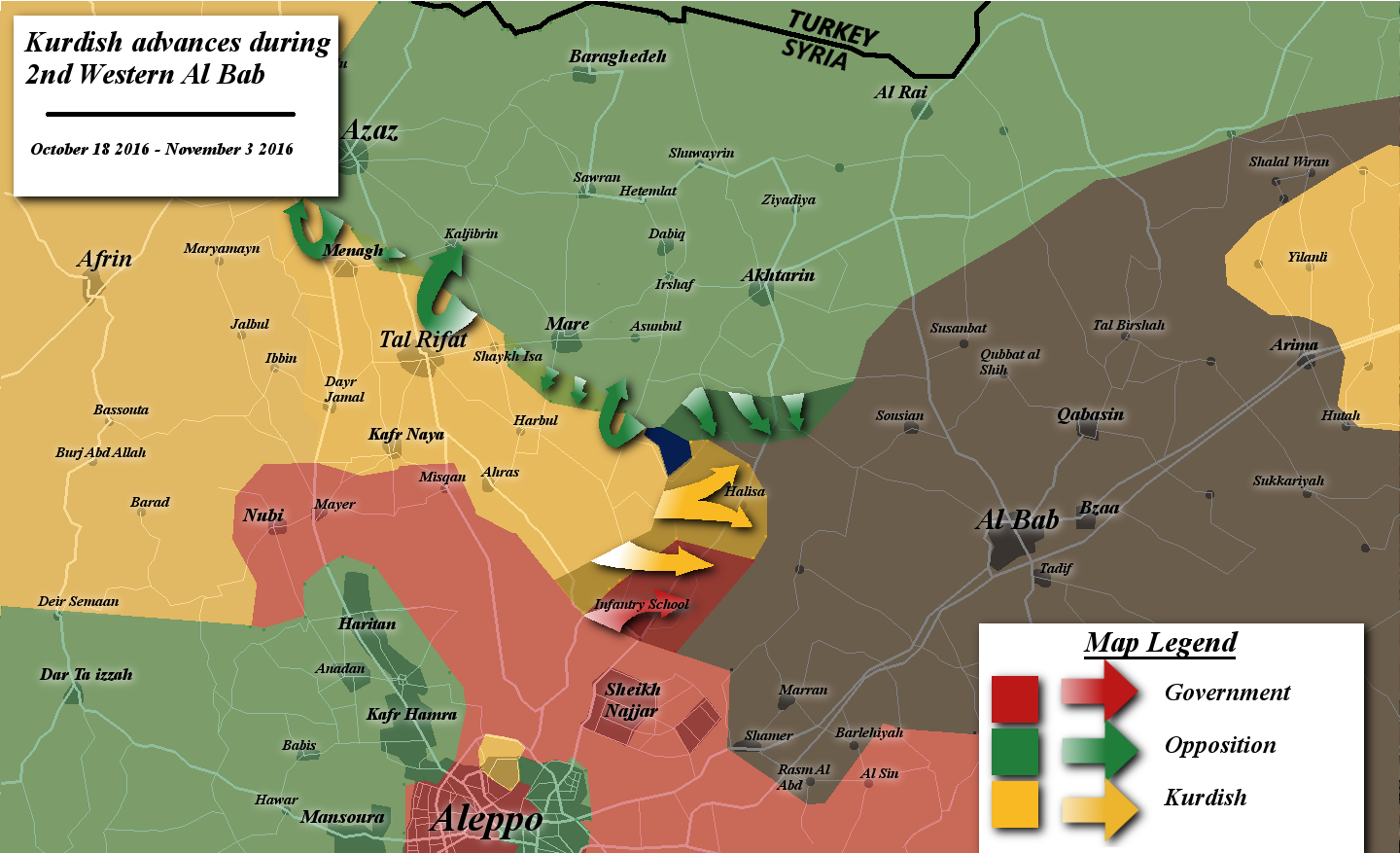
Map of the offensive

On 18 and 19 October, in response to Syrian National Army forces moving south following their capture of the town of Dabiq from ISIL and reaching the northern shore of the Shahba Reservoir, the Syrian Democratic Forces advanced to the southeast and captured several villages on the southern shore of the reservoir, including the dam. In response to the advance, rebel and Turkish artillery in the countryside of Azaz shelled positions of the Army of Revolutionaries in Herbel and other villages under the control of the SDF. Meanwhile, the Turkish Air Force also conducted 26 airstrikes on SDF positions in the area.

On 20 October, the rebels seized the Hasiyah farms (which the SDF had taken from ISIL), although the SDF still controlled the village of Hasiyah. Meanwhile, ISIL recaptured a hill from the SDF. The next day, fighting raged around three villages as the rebels attempted to advance against the SDF, while the Turkey-backed forces managed to capture one other. Concurrently, the SDF withdrew from six villages previously held by ISIL to avoid being cut off by the Turkish-backed rebels. Later that evening, the rebels withdrew after 10 hours of fighting, being unable to advance, while the SDF managed to recapture the village and farms they lost. The SDF started preparations for a second rebel attack expected the next day.

On 22 October, a new rebel assault, backed-up by Turkish tanks, was repelled, with one Turkish tank reportedly being hit by the SDF. Fighting was concentrated near Tell Rifaat, while Turkish tanks were positioned at both Tell Rifaat and Mare'. The next day, the SDF seized a farm in a counter-attack in the area of the Shahba dam, where they captured a rebel BMP-1 armored vehicle. A drone was also shot down by the SDF.

On 23 October, Turkish artillery continued shelling Sheikh Issa and Herbel, and Jandairis to the west away from the front was also extensively shelled. According to Hawar, bodies of 20 dead rebels were returned to Azaz, causing some rebels to refuse to join the fight against the SDF due to the heavy casualties and which led to internecine clashes. The next day, there were reports that the Levant Front ceased their attacks on the SDF and had retreated east. In contrast, the Hamza Division declared their continued determination to fight the pro-YPG forces and that the offensive against the SDF would soon resume. Meanwhile, rebel advances against ISIL resumed, with the rebels capturing five villages and a farm area.

=== Second week ===
On 25 October, the Turkish-backed rebels launched a new attack on the SDF, but the latter managed to repel the assault and retake three villages they had temporarily lost. Heavy fighting continued at Tal al-Madiq, where the SDF destroyed four rebel vehicles. Pro-rebel media accused the SDF of being helped by the Syrian Arab Air Force and Russian Air Force, while pro-Kurdish media claimed that the rebels had used chemical weapons during their offensive. By the next day, the SDF reportedly captured two villages from rebel forces in a counter-attack.

On 27 October, the rebels captured a number of villages from ISIL, encountering little resistance, while the SDF advanced north of Tal al-Madiq and near the Turkish border against the Levant Front and Turkish-backed FSA units.

Between 28 and 30 October, the SDF and the Syrian Army began to openly cooperate against ISIL, with both sides supporting each other during their advances. They captured 17 villages in total (as well as several farms) from ISIL, with 11 placed under SDF control and six (as well as Muslamiyah Cement Factory and Aleppo Infantry College) placed under Syrian Army control after a deal was made between the Army High Command and the SDF. Under the terms of this deal, the SAA was given control of a large buffer-zone around the northern perimeter of the Sheikh Najjar Industrial District in exchange for letting the SDF capture Al-Bab, should they reach it before the government. At the same time, ISIL forces launched a counter-attack against the Turkish-backed rebels, retaking a village. On 31 October, the SDF seized three villages and the Hassin farms from the Levant Front and FSA units.

=== Third week ===
On 1 November, ISIL recaptured 17 villages, including Akhtarin, from the rebels. The next day, the rebels recaptured most of Akhtarin, however ISIL forces still controlled minor parts of the town amid attempts by the rebels to drive them out. Meanwhile, heavy mortar and artillery bombardment by both Turkish-backed rebels and ISIL targeted SDF positions, killing over 20 and wounding dozens. The SDF accused both factions of co-ordinating their shelling.

== Aftermath ==
In early November 2016, a 'battalion' from the Sham Legion defected and joined the SDFs Manbij Military Council.

At this point, the rebels shifted their focus from the western countryside of al-Bab so to avoid confrontation by the SDF and launched an assault against ISIL north of al-Bab. Between 6 and 13 November, the rebels captured 29 villages, putting them within seven kilometers of al-Bab.

== See also ==
- Turkish involvement in the Syrian civil war
  - Battle of al-Bab
