= 2016 Dabiq offensive =

Military offensive

- Part of Operation Euphrates Shield and the Syrian Civil War
- Map of the wider Turkish-led operations in northern Aleppo and the wider campaigns in Aleppo Syrian Armed Forces & allied groups Syrian Democratic Forces Islamic State of Iraq and the Levant FSA groups and Turkish troops in Northern Syria
| Date | 28 September – 16 October 2016 (2 weeks and 4 days) |
| Location | Aleppo Governorate, Syria |
| Status | SNA-Turkish victory: SNA and Turkish forces capture Dabiq, Sawran, Akhtarin and 43 other towns and villages |

Belligerents
| Turkey (Syrian opposition) Syrian rebels Support: United States | Islamic State |

Commanders and leaders
| (Turkey) Lt. Gen. Zekai Aksakallı (Operations chief commander) (Turkey) Lt. Gen. İsmail Metin Temel (Second Army commander) (Syrian opposition) Col. Ahmed Othman (Sultan Murad Division commander) (Syrian opposition) Fahim Issa (Sultan Murad Division commander) (Syrian opposition) Ali Şeyh Salih (DOW) (Sultan Murad Division field commander) (Syrian opposition) Muhammad al-Gabi (Liberation Army commander) (Syrian opposition) Mohammad Abu Ibrahim (Syrian opposition) Mustafa Sejari (Al-Moutasem Brigade political leader); Mahmoud Abu Hamza (Descendants of Saladin Brigade commander); Capt. Abdel Salam Abdel Razaq (Nour al-Din al-Zenki Movement commander); Capt. Mohammed Abu Mustafa (Sham Legion commander); Abu Jafer (Brigade of Conquest commander) | Unknown |

Units involved
| (Turkey) Turkish Armed Forces; Turkish Land Forces; Turkish Air Force; Special Forces; (Syrian opposition) Hawar Kilis Operations Room; Sultan Murad Division; Descendants of Saladin Brigade; (Syrian opposition) Hamza Division; (Syrian opposition) Levant Front; Al-Moutasem Brigade; (Syrian opposition) Fastaqim Union; Sham Legion; (Syrian opposition) Akhtarin Military Council (from 3 October 2016); (Syrian opposition) Free Idlib Army; (Syrian opposition) 13th Division; (Syrian opposition) Liberation Army; Brigade of Conquest Other Syrian rebels Nour al-Din al-Zenki Movement; Ahrar al-Sham | Unknown |

Strength
| (Syrian opposition) 2,000 SNA (Turkey) 500 soldiers (United States) 40 military advisors | 800+ militants |

Casualties and losses
| 89+ SNA and 1 Turkish soldier killed | 183–210+ killed |

The 2016 Dabiq offensive was a military offensive and part of the third phase of Operation Euphrates Shield launched by the Turkish Armed Forces and factions from the Free Syrian Army (FSA, a Syrian rebel group) and allied groups, with the goal of capturing the town of Dabiq, north of Aleppo from the Islamic State (IS). It began in September and resulted in the capture of Dabiq by Turkish/FSA-allied forces on 16 October.

== Background ==
In anticipation of the offensive, ISIL reinforced Dabiq with 800 fighters. An ISIL defeat at Dabiq was seen as a potential ideological blow since it has a central place in ISIL's interpretation of Muslim theology. According to ISIL, a battle at Dabiq between Islamic and "infidel" Christian forces would herald the beginning of the apocalypse. The beginning of the Turkish military intervention in Syria also correlates to the 500th anniversary of the Battle of Marj Dabiq, when the Ottoman Empire led by Selim I entered northern Aleppo at Dabiq and conquered much of northern Syria.

== The offensive ==
=== First week ===
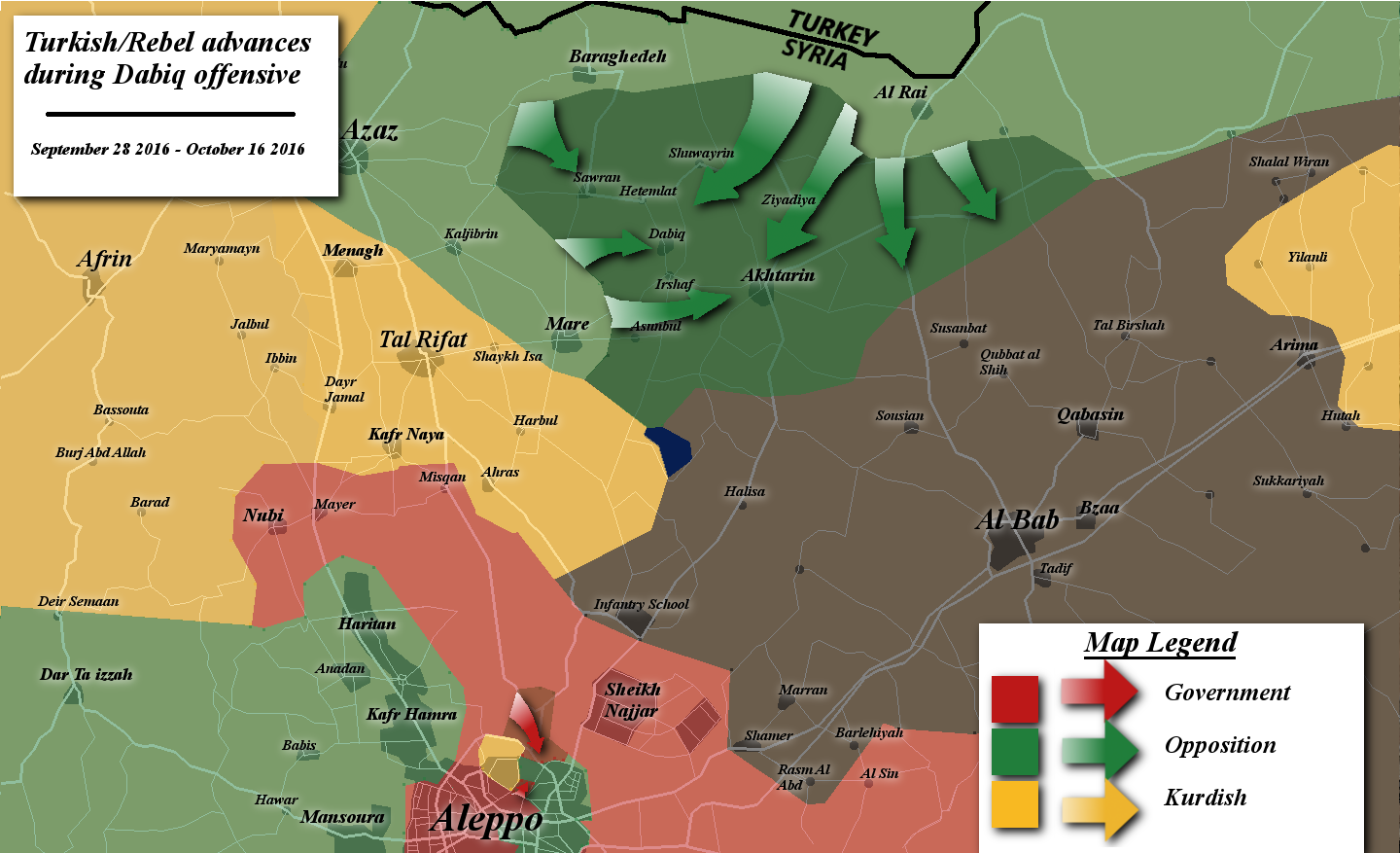
Map of the offensive

On 28 September, the Turkish military stated that it destroyed an ISIL command post, a weapons dump and an ammunition depot in the Ihtemlat and Uwayshiyyah areas of Aleppo Governorate, while 82 targets were struck by shells. It also stated that the rebels recaptured the Al Eyyubiyah residential area of al-Rai, while ISIL temporarily recaptured the Tal-ar area, before rebel and Turkish forces once again seized it in addition to Ziadiyah.

Between 29 September and 2 October, the rebels captured seven more villages from ISIL and had started advancing on Dabiq, with troops from U.S. Special Forces reported to be among them. By this point, the rebel and Turkish force was some three kilometers from Dabiq.

On 3 October, advancing rebel forces ran into hundreds of landmines at the village of Turkman Bareh, on the way to Dabiq, leaving 15–21 rebels dead and another 29–35 wounded. Between 4 and 5 October, rebels captured Turkman Bareh and five more villages, including three to the east of Akhtarin. Meanwhile, Turkish fighter jets reportedly killed a regional ISIL commander in air-strikes near Akhtarin and al-Qubtan.

=== Second week ===
The town of Akhtarin was captured by the rebels on 6 October. An ISIL counter-attack two days later briefly recaptured the town, along with four other villages, including Turkman Bareh, before reportedly being repelled. According to the Turkish military, 38 ISIL militants were killed in clashes and airstrikes during 8 to 9 October.

Between 9 and 11 October, the rebels captured 17 villages from ISIL, bringing them within two and a half kilometers of Dabiq. 30 rebels and 20 ISIL fighters were killed during the fighting. However, a subsequent ISIL counter-attack on 11 October, recaptured two villages. The Turkish military reported it had destroyed 98 ISIL targets during the clashes. Meanwhile, activists and eyewitnesses reported that shelling carried out by the rebels and Turkish Army on ISIL-held Duwaybiq village resulted in the deaths of at least 10 civilians and wounded many others.

=== Third week ===
On 12 October, the rebels captured Duwaybiq and also retook a village they lost the previous day. Meanwhile, the Turkish military stated that 109 militants had been killed and 77 ISIL targets destroyed between 11 and 13 October, with 10 rebels also being killed and at least 22 wounded in the clashes.

On 15 October, the rebels captured three more villages, with Dabiq at this point being almost fully surrounded. The next day, both Dabiq, the nearby town of Sawran and seven other villages were seized by the rebels.

== See also ==
- Western al-Bab offensive (2016)
- Manbij offensive (2016)
- Battle of al-Rai (August 2016)
- Western al-Bab offensive (October–November 2016)
