= Operation Euphrates Shield order of battle =

Order of battle

This is the order of battle for 2016-2017 Turkish cross-border military offensive, codenamed "Operation Euphrates Shield" by Turkey.

== Turkey and allied forces ==
- Turkey
  - Turkish Armed Forces
    - Turkish Land Forces
      - Third Army
        - 57th Commando Regiment
      - General Staff
        - Special forces
    - Turkish Naval Forces
      - Underwater Offence (Turkish Armed Forces)
      - SAS EOD (Explosive Ordnance Disposal)
      - Amphibious Marine Brigade (Turkish Armed Forces)
    - Turkish Air Force
      - 8th Main Jet Base Group Command (8. Ana Jet Üs Komutanlığı) (Diyarbakır)
        - 181st Squadron "Leopard" (181. Filo "Pars") - F-16C/D Block 40TM/Block 50+ Fighting Falcon (LANTIRN-specialised)
        - 182nd Squadron "Accipiter" (182. Filo "Atmaca") - F-16C/D Block 40 Fighting Falcon
        - 202nd Liaison and SAR Squadron "East" (202. İrtibat ve Arama-Kurtarma Filosu "Şark") - CN-235M-100, AS-532UL Mk.1+
      - 9th Main Jet Base Command (9. Ana Jet Üs Komutanlığı) (Balıkesir)
- (Syrian opposition) Free Syrian Army
  - (Syrian opposition) Hawar Kilis Operations Room
    - 1st Regiment
    - (Syrian opposition) Ahrar al-Sharqiya
    - (Syrian opposition) 51st Brigade
    - Fastaqim Union (reduced to remnant faction by January 2017)
    - Conquest Brigade (joined the Levant Front March 8, 2017)
    - (Syrian opposition) 1st Squad of Aleppo
    - (Syrian opposition) Hamza Division
    - (Syrian opposition) Levant Front
    - (Syrian opposition) Northern Falcons Brigade
    - Al-Moutasem Brigade
    - (Syrian opposition) Mustafa Regiment
    - Jaysh al-Nukhba
    - Islamic Freedom Battalions
    - Nour al-Din al-Zenki Movement (Northern Aleppo branch, joined the Sham Legion January 28, 2017)
    - Sham Legion
      - (Syrian opposition) Northern Brigade
    - Sultan Murad Division
    - Sultan Mehmed the Conqueror Brigade
    - (Syrian opposition) Island Revolutionaries
  - Alpasian Special Forces
  - (Syrian opposition) Authenticity and Development Front
  - Samarkand Brigade
  - (Syrian opposition) 5th Regiment
  - (Syrian opposition) 1st Security Division of Aleppo
  - (Syrian opposition) Northern Army (joined the Zenki Movement in November 2016, before defecting to the Levant Front on January 27, 2017)
  - Descendants of Saladin Brigade
  - (Syrian opposition) Liwa Ahrar Souriya (joined the Hamza Division September 2016, before defecting to the Zenki Movement on November 15, 2016)
  - Sultan Suleiman Shah Brigade
  - Muntasir Billah Brigade
  - (Syrian opposition) Tajamuu Al-Qaqaa
  - (Syrian opposition) 10th Brigade
  - (Syrian opposition) Northern Thunder Brigade
  - (Syrian opposition) Jaysh al-Ahfad
  - (Syrian opposition) Free Idlib Army (from September 2016)
- Ahrar al-Sham
- Jund al-Islam
- Dhi Qar Brigade
- Mare' Resistance Brigade
- Victory Bloc
- Abna al-Hasaka Union
- Al-Habib al-Mustafa Brigade
  Support:
- United States
  - United States Armed Forces
    - United States Air Force
    - United States special operations forces
    - United States Army
- Russia
  - Russian Armed Forces
    - Aerospace Forces
- United Kingdom
  - (United Kingdom) British Armed Forces
    - Royal Air Force

== ISIL ==
- Military of ISIL
  - Wilayat Halab

== Syrian Democratic Forces and allied forces ==
- Syrian Democratic Forces
  - YPG
  - YPJ
  - Anti-Terror Units
  - Manbij Military Council
    - Northern Sun Battalion
    - Seljuq Brigade
    - Manbij Revolutionaries Battalion
  - Jarabulus Military Council
    - (Syrian opposition) Euphrates Jarabulus Brigades
    - Free Jarabulus Brigades
    - Jarabulus Hawks Brigades
  - (Syrian opposition) Northern Democratic Brigade
- International Freedom Battalion
  - MLKP
  - TKP/ML TİKKO
  - United Freedom Forces
  - Bob Crow Brigade
  - Antifascist Internationalist Tabur
    Support:
- United States
  - United States Armed Forces
    - United States Air Force
    - United States special operations forces

== Syrian Government and allied forces ==
- Syria
  - Syrian Armed Forces
    - Syrian Army
      - Tiger Forces
    - Republican Guard
    - Syrian Arab Air Force
  - Syrian National Resistance
    - Kafr Saghir Martyrs Brigade
  - Syrian Resistance
- Hezbollah
  Support:
- Russia
  - Russian Armed Forces
    - Aerospace Forces

== Notes ==
a: Only against ISIL
b: Part of the Syrian Turkmen Brigades as well
