= Kata'ib al-Safwa al-Islamiya =

- Leaders: Ghassan Najjar; Zaki Lawlah
- Dates active: 2011-present
- Split from: Liwa al-Tawhid
- Merged into: Syrian National Army (2017)
- Allegiance: Free Syrian Army (2011-2017); Syrian National Army (2017-2025)
- Headquarters: Western Aleppo
- Active regions: Aleppo Governorate, Hama Governorate, Idlib Governorate
- Part of: Mare' Operations Room (2015); Fatah Halab (2015-2016); Hawar Kilis Operations Room (2016)

Kata'ib al-Safwa al-Islamiya, also known as Kata'ib al-Safwa, and the al-Safwah Islamic Battalions was a rebel group formed in 2011 that fought in the Syrian civil war with the goal of overthrowing the Assad regime.

== History ==
Kata'ib al-Safwa was founded in 2011. They were initially integrated in Liwa al-Tawhid, but defected in October 2013. KaS was affiliated with the Free Syrian Army. In 2014, the group joined the Mare' Operations Room, the following year they joined Fatah Halab in Aleppo. In 2016, KaS joined the Hawar Kilis Operations Room. By 2016, the group was composed of the Minhaj al-Sunnah Battalions, Rijal Allah Battalion, Mecca Battalion, Al-Quwa Al-Muwahada Battalion, Yusuf Al-Halabi Battalion, Al-Ansari battalion, Omar Bin Abdulaziz Battalion, the Engineering Battalion and Saif Allah Battalion. These groups reunited under the name of Kata'ib al-Safwa in October 2016.

By October 2016, the group had 550 men, including 17 officers and 35 vehicles. The commander-in-chief was Ghassan Najjar (nom de guerre Abu Hussein Najjar). Army defector Zaki Lawlah was part of KaS. In 2015, a top leader Abu Mariam and the head of KaS's media Husam al-Najjar (Abu Yazan al-Halabi) were killed in an airstrike. Kata'ib al-Safwa had connections to the American Central Intelligence Agency.

Kata'ib al-Safwa predominantly fought in Aleppo and the surrounding countryside. Between 2016 and 2017, KaS fought in Operation Euphrates Shield and the Battle of al-Bab, engaging in clashes against Hay'at Tahrir al-Sham. In March 2017, KaS fought in the 2017 Hama offensive. Their headquarters in 2017 was in western Aleppo.

In 2017, Kata'ib al-Safwa joined the Syrian National Army.
