= Northern Aleppo offensive (March–June 2016) =

Military offensive

Coordinates: 36.4828°N 37.1950°E

- Part of the Opposition–Islamic State conflict and the Syrian Civil War
Date	10 March – 8 June 2016 (2 months, 4 weeks and 1 day)
Location	Northern Aleppo Governorate, Syria
Result	Partial FSA victory: The rebels capture the town of al-Rai, its border crossing and 20 villages; ISIL recaptures al-Rai, its border crossing and 34 villages; ISIL attack on Azaz and Mare' repelled and rebels capture 11 villages, including Sawran

Belligerents
(Syrian opposition) Free Syrian Army Army of Conquest; CJTF-OIR: Turkey; United States	Islamic State

Commanders and leaders
(Turkey) İsmet Yılmaz(Defence Minister) (Turkey) Gen. Hulusi Akar (Chief of General Staff) (Turkey) Hakan Fidan (MİT head) (Syrian opposition) Firas Paşa (Muntasir Billah Brigade)	Unknown

Units involved
(Syrian opposition) Free Syrian Army; Hawar Kilis Operations Room; Sham Legion; Sultan Murad Brigade; Mu'tasim Division; (Syrian opposition) Levant Front; (Syrian opposition) Conquest Brigade; Fastaqim Union; Northern Division; 13th Division; Mountain Hawks Brigade; Nour al-Din al-Zenki Movement; Muntasir Billah Brigade; Descendants of Saladin Brigade; Victory Brigade	Military of ISIL

Strength
(Syrian opposition) 1,500 (in Mare')	

Casualties and losses
61 killed (late May ISIL assault)	578 killed (Turkish and rebel claims)

The Northern Aleppo offensive (March–June 2016) was a series of military operations launched by Syrian opposition forces against the Islamic State of Iraq and the Levant and vice versa in the northern Aleppo Governorate, near the Syria–Turkey border, the city of Azaz and the town of Mare'. The offensive is supported by airstrikes against ISIL conducted by the United States-led CJTF-OIR coalition and artillery shelling by the Turkish Armed Forces.

== The offensive ==
=== Initial rebel gains ===
Between 10 and 14 March, rebel forces seized three villages, including Dudyan. On 17 March, ISIL recaptured Dudyan, but lost it again the next day.

On 19 March 2016, rebel forces captured two villages (Toqli and Mregel), north of Aleppo, from ISIL. The following day, Ahrar ash-Sham and the Sultan Murad Brigade exchanged artillery and mortar fire with ISIL. At the end of the battle, ISIL recaptured the villages of Toqli and Mregel after inflicting heavy casualties on the rebels. The two sides also launched shells at the villages of Qara Kopri and Ghazl, causing civilian casualties. On 30 March, rebel forces once again seized Toqli and Mregel. Concurrently, Turkish artillery shelled ISIS positions in the village of Jakkah.

=== Rebels advance and capture al-Rai ===
On 1 April, ISIL launched an offensive toward the Levant Front headquarters in the outskirts of Mregel. The attack was repelled by the Sham Legion and the Falcons of Mount Zawiya Brigade and an ISIL bulldozer was destroyed. The rebels than proceeded to capture two villages. Two days later, the al-Moutasem Brigade, the Sultan Murad Brigade, and the Sham Legion launched an offensive toward the ISIL stronghold of al-Rai to the east, capturing eight villages and reached within four kilometers from al-Rai by 4 April. Some of the villages that were seized were: Tal Sha'er, Raqbya, Qantra and Shaabanya. As of 5 April, the rebels had captured at least 16 villages in the area.

On 7 April, with close air support from A-10 Thunderbolt IIs, the rebels captured most of al-Rai and the nearby border crossing. As of 8 April, the rebels had full control of al-Rai, along with 17 other villages.

=== First ISIL counter-attack and recapture of al-Rai ===
Two days later, early on 10 April, ISIL launched a counter-attack, which included a three-pronged attack against the town of Mare', and quickly recaptured eight villages. Still, the rebels once again seized four of the villages several hours later. During the day, the international Coalition conducted at least 22 air-strikes on ISIL positions as ground fighting continued. On 11 April, ISIL continued with its counter-attack and retook al-Rai and four other villages. In all, ISIL had recaptured in the previous two days, beside al-Rai, 17 other villages. The ISIL counter-offensive included attacks by 11 suicide car-bombers against rebel positions. At the end of the day, the rebels managed once again to retake control of eight villages. As of 12 April, ISIL was reportedly in control of 13 localities they had previously lost, including al-Rai.

By 13 April, the rebels managed to retake three villages once again. However, on 14 April, ISIL seized 10 new villages, practically cutting rebel forces in two. Rebels in the town of Dudyan were effectively surrounded. The most important village that ISIL captured was Hiwar Kallis, about one kilometer south of the Turkish border. During the ISIL advance, hundreds of rebel fighters retreated across the border into Turkey. By the following day, the rebels re-secured five villages, including Hiwar Kallis, reconnecting the two rebel areas.

Between 15 and 16 April, the back-and-forth fighting continued, with ISIL once again taking control of two villages, while the rebels took two others. On 17 April, ISIL again captured the village of Tall Battal, west of al-Rai.

Four days after ISIL regained most of the villages it had lost, the rebels launched a new assault and once again retook two villages. However, ISIL retook them the following day, as well as one other.

=== Second ISIL counter-attack ===
Between 26 and 27 April, ISIL launched a new counter-attack, seizing five or six villages, including Dudyan. The rebels retreated to Azaz and Hiwar Kallis. ISIL's advance put them in a good position to strike both Azaz and Mare'. Hours later, the rebels recaptured Dudyan. Between 28 and 30 April, the rebels re-seized three other villages.

Between 1 and 3 May, ISIL once again seized Dudiyan, as well as seven other villages, although they lost Dudiyan and two others several hours later. Dudiyan changed hands three more times between 5 and 7 May, eventually coming again under ISIL control.

Between 7 and 13 May, back-and-forth fighting continued at four villages. Between 15 and 17 May, three villages were once again under rebel control, preventing a potential ISIL attack on Azaz. However, ISIL took five villages on 19 May, including those they lost.

=== Siege of Mare' and ISIL assault on Azaz ===
On 26 May, ISIL launched a new assault, quickly collapsing the rebel frontline. ISIL captured several new villages, came to within 5 kilometers of Azaz and reduced rebel territory to less than 20 villages. Later in the evening, ISIL made more advances and cut the rebel's supply line to Mare'. 30–33 rebels and 11 ISIL fighters were killed, and another 10 rebels were captured. The surprise ISIL attack forced the evacuation of medical facilities and the fleeing of civilians from the area. An estimated 100,000–160,000 civilians were reported trapped in the rebel pocket on the border with Turkey. On 27 May, ISIL continued to advance, taking more territory and reaching the eastern outskirts of Azaz. However, a rebel counter-attack during the day, backed-up by U.S. airstrikes, recaptured four villages. In the evening, ISIL's attack on Mare' started.

On 28 May, the Kurdish-led SDF secured Shaykh Issa, one of two towns in the Mare' pocket, to prevent its capture by ISIL forces. Meanwhile, five ISIL attacks against Mare' were repelled. At the beginning of the assault on Mare', two ISIL suicide bombers hit rebel positions, after which ISIL forces managed to enter the town from the east and street fighting started. During the fighting, ISIL fighters surrounded the town's hospital for 10 hours and attempted to storm it before being repelled. At one point, a U.S. air-strike accidentally hit a rebel position killing seven rebels.

On 29 May, the rebels recaptured the Scientific Research area near Azaz. By this point, 61 rebels, 47 ISIL fighters and 29 civilians had been killed since the start of the ISIL offensive. Meanwhile, the SDF closed the corridors it had opened earlier for civilians and wounded coming from Azaz and Mare' into Kurdish territory after rebel forces continued to attack the Kurdish-held part of Aleppo city. 6,000 civilians fled to the Kurdish Afrin canton. At the same time, the Sharia Court in Azaz issued an order that civilians would not be allowed to enter the town due to the possibility of ISIL infiltrators being among the refugees. The SDF corridor was reopened after one day.

By 30 May, of the nine villages they had initially lost, the rebels managed to recapture five, including one of the two on the road between Azaz and Mare'. On 31 May, the rebels, supported by Turkish artillery, launched an attack on the second village in an attempt to break the siege of Mare'. During the fighting, the rebels destroyed an ISIL car-bomb. However, the rebel counter-attack eventually failed when an ISIL suicide bomber killed six rebels.

Early on 2 June, the U.S.-led Coalition reportedly parachuted a large weapons cache to the rebels surrounded in Mare'.

On 8 June, the siege of Mare' was broken after rebel forces recaptured several villages on the road between Azaz and Mare'. Later during the day, ISIL retreated from nine other towns and villages, although the rebels had not yet entered them to take control out of fear they would be ambushed.

== Aftermath ==
In the weeks that followed, back-and-forth fighting in the area continued, with the rebels taking seven villages, including al-Rai, before they were once again recaptured by ISIL.

== See also ==
- East Aleppo offensive (2015–16)
- Northern Aleppo offensive (February 2016)
- 2016 Khanasir offensive
- 2016 Southern Aleppo campaign
- Aleppo offensive (June–August 2016)
