= Western al-Bab offensive (September 2016) =

Militar offensive

- Part of the Syrian Civil War, the Syrian Kurdish-Islamist conflict (2013-present), and the American-led intervention in Syria
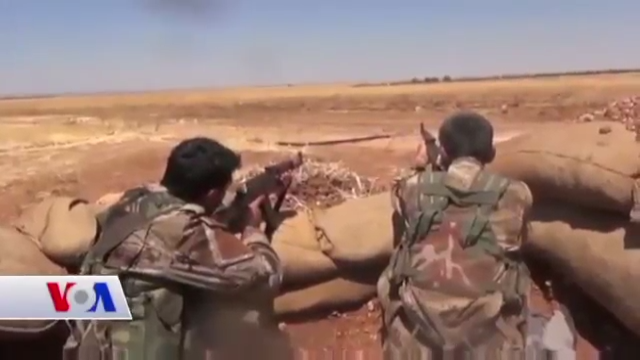
- Jabhat al-Akrad fighters near Herbel, two months before the offensive
Date	30 August – 6 September 2016 (1 week; First phase); 24–28 September 2016 (4 days; Second phase)
Location	Azaz District, Aleppo Governorate (For a war map of the current situation in Western al-Bab, see here.)
Result	Limited SDF gains: SDF capture 7 villages; ISIL launches four counter-attacks

Belligerents
Syrian Democratic Forces; CJTF-OIR: United States	Islamic State

Commanders and leaders
Ahmed Sultan Abu Arraj (Army of Revolutionaries deputy commander); Abu Steyf (Jabhat al-Akrad commander); Zaidoun Hedo (SDF official)	Unknown

Units involved
Syrian Democratic Forces; Army of Revolutionaries; Jabhat al-Akrad; Shahba Women's Front; Tel Rifaat Revolutionaries Battalion; Quwat al-Ashair (Tribal Forces); (Syrian opposition) Northern Democratic Brigade; People's Protection Units; Women's Protection Units; Al-Bab Military Council	Unknown

Strength
Unknown	3,000+ militants

Casualties and losses
40 killed (SOHR and SDF claim); One BMP-1 and one T-72 destroyed 30 killed (ISIL claim)	58 killed, 7 vehicles destroyed (SDF claim)

The western al-Bab offensive (September 2016) was a military operation launched by the Syrian Democratic Forces (SDF) against the Islamic State of Iraq and the Levant in the countryside of northwestern Aleppo Governorate, south of the towns of Mare' and Tel Rifaat.

== Preparations ==
On 14 August 2016, just after the capture of Manbij during the Manbij offensive, several SDF factions led by 16 commanders formed the al-Bab Military Council, modelled after the Manbij Military Council, in order to capture territory in the al-Bab countryside and eventually the city itself from ISIL. The military council called for US support in the planned offensive. The main forces of the council would attack al-Bab from its eastern side, though elements of the council do also have a presence on the western front.

== The offensive ==
=== Initial SDF advances ===
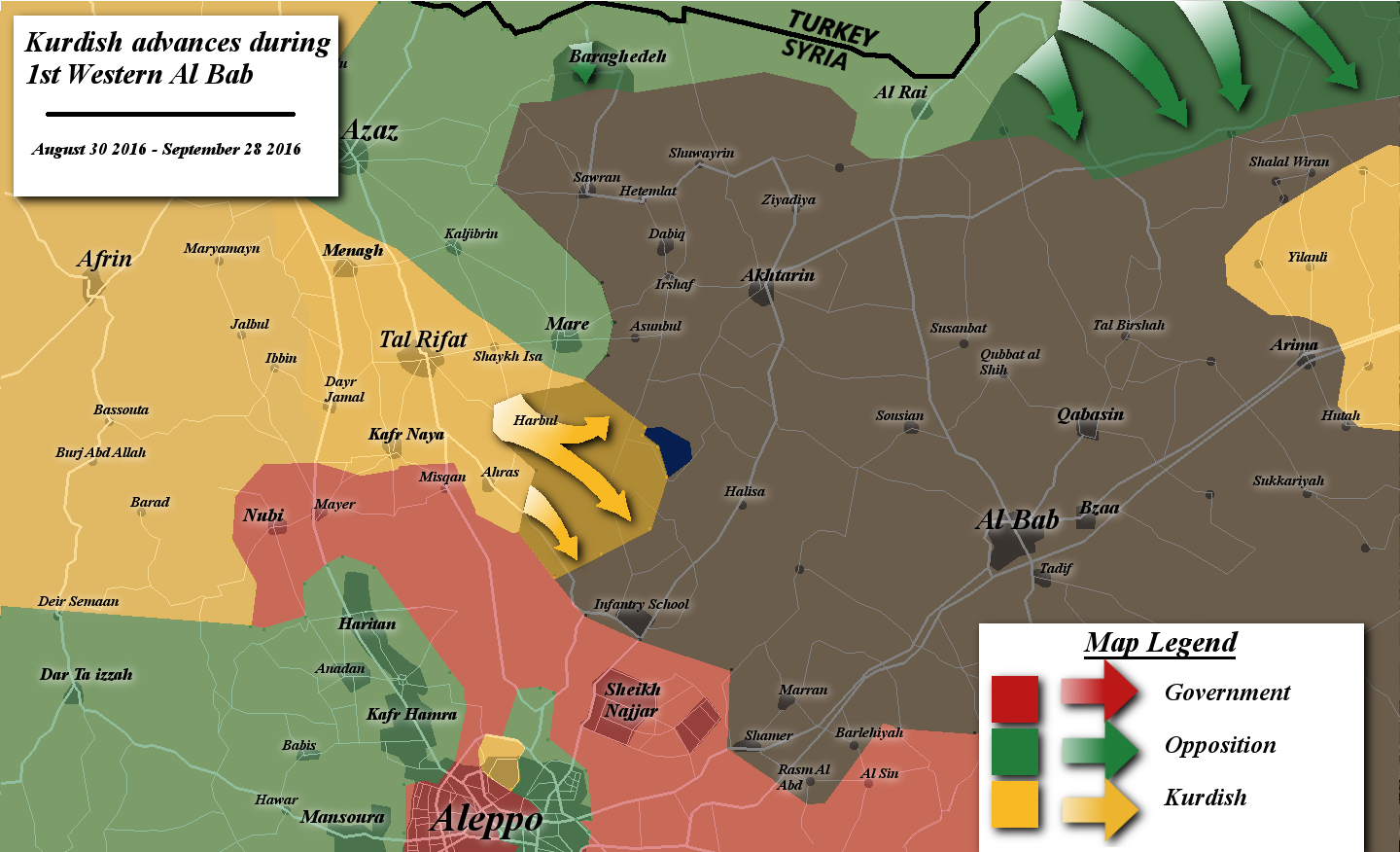
Map of the offensive

On 30 August 2016, following heavy mortar bombardment and US Air Force airstrikes on ISIL positions in the villages that killed 13 fighters and destroyed five of their vehicles, forcing them to withdraw, the SDF in Afrin, led by the Army of Revolutionaries, entered and captured the villages of Maarat Umm Hawsh, Umm Qura, Herbel, and Tell Qarah.

The next day, ISIL launched a counter-attack on Herbel and briefly recaptured it. However, the Revolutionary Army reentered the village and retook it, capturing a stash of weapons and ammunition, and the Syrian independence flag was raised in the town. A US airstrike destroyed a mortar in the area. In the evening of that day ISIL sent two car bombs at the village but they were reportedly destroyed before they could reach their targets.

SDF engineering units dismantled and detonated 70 land mines by 2 September. US airstrikes destroyed seven ISIL positions and a weapons cache on the same day. SDF positions in Umm Qura were shelled by ISIL during the night which prompted them to shell back. Minesweeping operations continued as dozens of landmines remain in the village.

ISIL launched a second counter-attack on Umm Hosh and Umm Qara on 4 September, after bombarding the villages with heavy weapons. ISIL claimed it had recaptured Umm Qara and killed around 30 SDF fighters and destroyed 2 of their armoured vehicles with anti-tank missiles. On 6 September, the SDF captured the village of Wahshiyah.

On 8 September, ISIL evacuated its headquarters in al-Bab and moved it to Khafsa located east of the city with dozens of vehicles carrying militants and weapons, this came a day after Turkish-led rebel forces also expressed their goal of capturing al-Bab.

=== ISIL counter-offensives and further SDF gains ===
On 19 September, after shelling the village with rocket artillery and exploding 2 car bombs, ISIL launched another counter-offensive on Umm Hosh from three axes. Intense clashes between the SDF and ISIL continued the next day, and 16 SDF fighters were killed. The front in Umm Hosh eventually calmed, however fighting continued in the outskirts of the village.

On 24 and 25 September, the SDF captured al-Hasia and Hassadjek, with clashes ongoing in Bayt Isa and Tall Saussine south of Tell Qara. After this the SDF reached within 20 km west of al-Bab city.

On 28 September, ISIL launched a fourth counteroffensive, launching 2 car bombs at SDF checkpoints around Umm Qura and Umm Hosh and launching mortar shells on the SDF headquarters in the area. SDF forces responded by firing heavy artillery at ISIL positions in the villages of Wahshiya, Hesasik and Tel Maled. According to the SDF at least 16 ISIL militants were killed and six SDF fighters were killed in the attacks. Clashes also erupted between SDF fighters and ISIL militants near the town of Herbel where two ISIS vehicles were destroyed and eight militants were killed according to the SDF. Three SDF fighters were killed in these clashes.

US warplanes assisted the SDF by conducting at least three airstrikes on ISIL fighting positions which forced the ISIL militants to withdraw. The SDF spokesman Ahmed Sultan stated that the clashes stopped around midnight, and due to US airstrikes, the ISIL forces withdrew from their positions.

== Aftermath - SDF confrontation with Turkey-backed FSA ==
Mid-October, in response to advances by the Turkey-backed Free Syrian Army forces against ISIL in the area of Dabiq, the SDF started their own advances.

== See also ==
- Turkish military intervention in the Syrian Civil War
  - Northern al-Bab offensive (September 2016)
- Northern Aleppo offensive (March–June 2016)
