= Mare' Operations Room =

- غرفة عمليات مارع
- Dates active: September 2014—January 2016 (largely defunct)
- Headquarters: Mare', Syria
- Active regions: Aleppo Governorate
- Wars: Syrian Civil War

The Mare' Operations Room (Arabic: غرفة عمليات مارع, Turkish: Mare Operasyon Odası) was a joint operations room of armed Syrian rebel factions based around the town of Mare' in the Azaz District of Aleppo Governorate to fight against the Islamic State.

== History ==
The operations room was in conflict with the People's Protection Units and Army of Revolutionaries, as part of the Syrian Democratic Forces, from late November 2015 until early December 2015, when a truce was reached, though the Army of Revolutionaries refused to abide by it. At the end of December 2015, the Mare' Operations Room cancelled its agreement with the SDF after the latter captured a village from the former.

In January 2016 the commander of the Mare' Operations Room, Major Yasser Abdul Rahim, who was also commander of the Sham Legion, resigned due to the lack of coordination between member groups of the operations room. Yasser continued to be the commander of Fatah Halab after he moved to Aleppo city. As a result, the operations room has become largely defunct. It was superseded by the Hawar Kilis Operations Room, established in April 2016.

== Member groups ==
- Mountain Hawks Brigade
- Sham Legion
- Levant Front
  - Levant Revolutionaries Battalions
- Fastaqim Union
- Descendants of Saladin Brigade
- Al-Mu'tasim Brigade
- Victory Brigades
- Sultan Murad Division
  - Sultan Mehmed the Conqueror Brigade
- Free Syria Brigade
- Elite Islamic Battalion

== See also ==
- List of armed groups in the Syrian Civil War
