= Mu'tasim Division =

Military unit

- فرقة المُعتصم; Firqat al-Mu'tasim
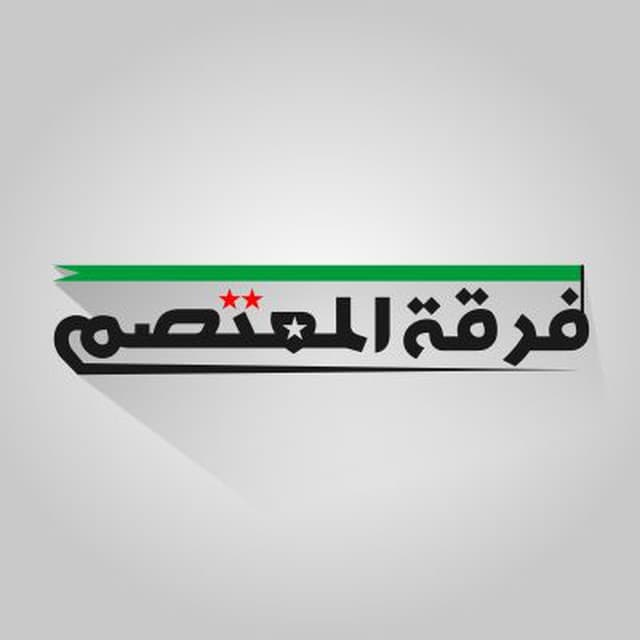
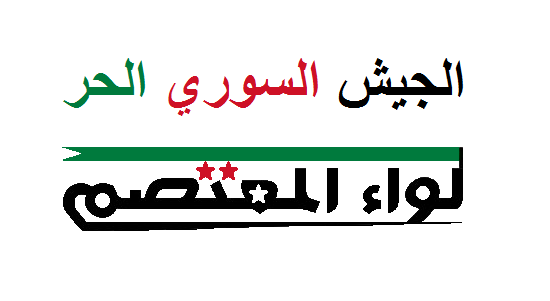
- Logo of al-Mu'tasim Division Flag of the Mu'tasim Brigade
- Leaders: Lieutenant Colonel Muhammad Hassan Khalil; Lieutenant Assad Nasser; Mustafa Sejari (political leader); Captain Anis Haj; Abu al-Abbas; Awad Abu Saqr (surrendered) (former military commander)
- Dates active: 4 August 2015 – unknown
- Allegiance: Syrian Interim Government
- Headquarters: Mare'
- Active regions: Aleppo Governorate, Syria
- Size: 500 (2016); 1,000 (2017)
- Part of: (Syrian opposition) Free Syrian Army (Syrian opposition) Syrian National Army: Syrian Front for Liberation; Mare' Operations Room (2015–16); Hawar Kilis Operations Room (since April 2016)
- Website: https://twitter.com/AlmotacemBrigad

The Mu'tasim Division (Arabic: فرقة المُعتصم, romanized: Firqat al-Mu'tasim), formerly the Mutasim Brigade (Arabic: لواء المعتصم, romanized: Liwa al-Mu'tasim), was a Free Syrian Army faction active in the northern Aleppo Governorate, based in the town of Mare'.

== Ideology ==
The Mu'tasim Division supports the political Syrian peace process. However, it opposes the U.S.–Russia peace proposals on Syria. The commander of the group has called for "freedom and justice", which led to tensions between him and the al-Nusra Front, seeing him as a threat to al-Nusra's project. The Mu'tasim Division has criticised al-Nusra for “attacking rebel factions, stealing weapons of the Mujahideen, cutting roads, seizing headquarters, refusing to respect Shariah practices, and tarnishing the reputation of the sons and leaders of the revolution.”

== History ==
The group's commander, Lieutenant Colonel Muhammad Hassan Khalil, was originally a rebel commander in Jabal al-Akrad, Latakia Governorate. However, in 2015 he was forced out of Latakia by the al-Nusra Front after tensions between the two groups. His group then moved to Aleppo.

In April 2016 the group participated in the Northern Aleppo offensive (March–June 2016), along with the Sham Legion and the Sultan Murad Division, driving vehicles from Doudiyan toward ISIL positions in al-Rai and capturing eight villages in the way.

In June the group formed an alliance with the Descendants of Saladin Brigade and six other rebel groups in Mare' after breaking an ISIL siege on the town. The new coalition claims to have 1,500 fighters under a unified military command and established contact with the rival Syrian Democratic Forces. Later that month, Muhammad Hassan Khalil was kidnapped in Mare'. The Mu'tasim Brigade accused Major General Dara Aza, former commander of rebels in Mare', and al-Nusra Front of carrying out the abduction.

In August and September the Mu'tasim Brigade participated in Operation Euphrates Shield which captured Jarabulus and al-Rai.

On 12 April 2017, 100 new fighters of the Mu'tasim Brigade graduated after they completed training in a camp near Mare', bringing the total number of members in the group to 1,000, according to one of its commanders.

On 29 June 2017, Awad Abu Saqr, a military commander in the Mu'tasim Brigade, defected to the Syrian Democratic Forces.

On 25 April 2018, the Mu'tasim Brigade withdraw its recognition of the National Coalition for Syrian Revolutionary and Opposition Forces due to the National Coalition's inability to make national decisions. The group's decision came hours after George Sabra, Suheir Atassi, and Khaled Khoja resigned from the National Coalition.

On 12 May 2018, commanders of Jaysh al-Islam and al-Rahman Legion, who frequently fought until they were defeated in eastern Ghouta and transferred to northern Aleppo, met in the Mu'tasim Brigade's headquarters and pledged not to continue fighting each other. Syrian Interim Government head Jawad Abu Hatab also attended the meeting.

Fighting broke out between the group's head, Al-Mutasim Abbas, his brother, Ahmed Abbas, and other members of the leadership (including Mustafa Sejiri, Al-Farouq Abu Bakr and Muhammad Al-Daher) at an April 2024 meeting in which Ahmed Abbas was killed. Sejiri, Abu Bakr, Al-Daher and Jamil Lala, the military police director, were all confirmed arrested.

On 17 August 2025, the group's prominent leader, Alaa al-Din Ayoub (known as "Al-Farouq Abu Bakr"), was assassinated in Azaz.

Although the Mu'tasim Division, as part of the Syrian National Army, has been under the jurisdiction of the Syrian caretaker government since January 2025, there have been reports of its commanders extorting money in Afrin since then.

== See also ==
- List of military units named after people
