= Victory Brigades (Syrian rebel group) =

- ألوية النصر; Alwiya al-Nasr
- Leader: Ahmed Fattouh
- Dates active: 31 May 2016–June 2016
- Groups: Ahrar al-Shamal Brigade; Azaz Martyrs Brigade; Criterion Brigade; Free Men of Manbij Brigade; Ibad al-Rahman Brigade; Glories Brigade; Horrors Battalion; Kafr Kalbin Battalion; Light of Faith Battalion; Martyr Alaa Besut Battalion; Syrian Martyrs Battalion; Light of Truth Battalion; Northern Commando Battalion; Revolutionary Lions Battalion; Syrian Martyrs Battalion
- Headquarters: Azaz, Syria
- Active regions: Aleppo Governorate, Syria
- Part of: (Syrian opposition) Free Syrian Army
- Wars: the Syrian Civil War

Alwiya al-Nasr or the Victory Brigades (Arabic: ألوية النصر) was a Syrian rebel group formed by 14 rebel factions in Azaz in an attempt to militarily and politically unite the separated opposition groups in the area. The group's goal aimed to prevent the partition of northern Syria and to break the siege of Mare'. Soon after its formation in June 2016 its leaders were arrested by the Levant Front on allegations of cooperating with Russia.
