= Battle of al-Rai (August 2016) =

Part of the Syrian Civil War

- Part of the Opposition–Islamic State conflict during the Syrian Civil War
Date	15–20 August 2016 (5 days)
Location	Al-Bab District, northern Aleppo Governorate, Syria-Turkey border
Status	FSA victory: First FSA attack on al-Rai repelled; The FSA gains full control over al-Rai after a second offensive; FSA repels a second ISIL counter-offensive

Belligerents
Free Syrian Army; Supported by: Turkey	Islamic State

Commanders and leaders
Ismail Ahwaz (FSA commander); Saleh Zein (Sham Legion field commander); Col. Ahmed Osman (Sultan Murad Division squad commander); Lt. Col. Abdul Moneim (Northern Division commander)	(Islamic State) Unnamed ISIL leader (POW)

Units involved
(Syrian opposition) Free Syrian Army; Northern Division; (Syrian opposition) Hamza Division; 13th Division; Sultan Murad Division; (Syrian opposition) Fastaqim Kama Umirt; Mountain Hawks Brigade; Sham Legion; (Syrian opposition) Levant Front; Harakat Nour al-Din al-Zenki; Turkish Armed Forces; Turkish Land Forces	Military of the Islamic State: Wilayat Halab

Casualties and losses
Unknown	10+ killed

The Battle of al-Rai was fought in August 2016 between the Free Syrian Army (FSA) and the Islamic State in the border town of al-Rai, part of the northern Aleppo Governorate on the border with Turkey, which resulted in the FSA capturing the town.

== Background ==
On 8 April 2016, rebels from the Hawar Kilis Operations Room captured al-Rai and more than a dozen other villages, but withdrew after an ISIL counter-offensive 3 days later that recaptured almost all the villages they have lost. The rebels also briefly took over the town for a few hours in June before being driven out.

== The battle ==
On 15 August 2016, after heavy artillery bombardment rebels began to storm the al-Rai grain silos and captured the silos along with several other positions. However, they were forced to withdraw the next morning after an ISIL counterattack from the north which recaptured all the points ISIL lost. Landmines played a role in slowing down the offensive.

On 17 August, FSA fighters launched a second assault after targeting IS positions with rocket artillery, breaking through the first lines of defense and re-entering the town. The FSA blew up 3 car bombs during the battle and fully captured al-Rai and its border crossing later that day, taking a number of surrendering ISIL militants as prisoners of war.

On the same day, the USAF operating as part of the CJTF-OIR conducted air support for the rebels during the battle by bombing several IS units near al-Rai. Fighting continued in the outskirts of the town as ISIL retained its headquarters in nearby Dudyan.

Due to the short time given to rebels to fortify the area, IS launched a rapid counter-offensive from the east on 19 August and recaptured the grain silos and nearby hilltops. However, the rebels repelled the attack on the town and claimed to have killed more than 10 IS fighters. FSA fighters also recaptured the grain silos the next day.

== Aftermath ==
On 20 August, a large number of rebels and a military convoy containing more than 50 vehicles loaded with heavy and medium weapons from al-Rai were transferred to the Turkish border with Jarabulus, as the Turkish Armed Forces prepared for an attack on Jarabulus.

Between 27 and 28 August, the rebels claimed to have captured three villages east of al-Rai. However, it was reported that on 27 August, IS recaptured al-Rai. The next day, al-Rai was once again reported to be rebel-held. By 4 September, FSA captured all of the ISIL-controlled territory along the Turkish-Syrian border.
