= Operation Euphrates Shield =

Turkish cross-border military operation

Coordinates: 36.819°N 38.011°E

- Part of the Turkey–IS conflict, the Rojava conflict, the War against the Islamic State, the Opposition–Islamic State conflict, and Turkish involvement in the Syrian civil war
- Turkish-backed opposition control SDF control Syrian Army control Islamic State control For a more detailed, up-to-date, interactive map, see here.
Date	24 August 2016 – 29 March 2017 (7 months and 5 days)
Location	Aleppo Governorate, Syria
Result	Turkish and TFSA victory
Territorial changes	Turkish-backed Syrian rebels captured a total of 2,055 square kilometres (793 sq mi), including 230 settlements, increasing FSA-controlled territory in the region to 2,225 square kilometres (859 sq mi); Islamic State of Iraq and the Levant-held territory along the Turkish–Syrian border completely captured by the Turkish-backed rebels

Belligerents
Turkey (Syrian opposition) Turkish-backed Free Syrian Army; Support: United States; Russia; United Kingdom	Islamic State	Syrian Democratic Forces; International Freedom Battalion; Support: United States Syrian Arab Republic (minor clashes); Support: Russia

Commanders and leaders
(Turkey) Lt. Gen. Zekai Aksakallı (Operations chief commander) (Turkey) Lt. Gen. İsmail Metin Temel (Second Army commander) (Syrian opposition) Col. Ahmed Othman (Sultan Murad Division commander) (Syrian opposition) Fahim Issa (Sultan Murad Division commander) Others: (Syrian opposition) Brig. Gen. Sayf Bulad (Hazma Division) Mahir Basha (Muntasar Billah Brigade commander) Mustafa Cahit (Muntasar Billah Brigade commander) (Syrian opposition) Mohammad Abu Ibrahim (Levant Front field commander) (Syrian opposition) Mustafa Sejari (Al-Moutasem Brigade political leader) (Syrian opposition) Abu Mohammed Kafr Zita (Liberation Brigade commander) Mahmoud Abu Hamza (Descendants of Saladin Brigade commander) Capt. Abdul Salam Abdul Razaq Nour al-Din al-Zenki Movement commander, until 28 January) Capt. Mohammed Abu Mustafa (Sham Legion commander) Abu Jafer (Brigade of Conquest commander) (Artillery base commander of Levant Front) (Syrian opposition) Yusuf Sibli (Qabasin Military Council commander) (Syrian opposition) Brig. Gen. Abdul Razaq Aslan (Police force head) (Syrian opposition) Taha Atrach (1st Aleppo Division commander); DOW: (Syrian opposition) Ali Şeyh Salih (DOW) (Sultan Murad Division field commander) (Syrian opposition) Muhammad al-Gabi (DOW) (Liberation Army commander)	KIA and targeted killings; Abu Ansari † (Emir of al-Bab) Abu Hussein al-Tunusi † (ISIL southern Raqqa field commander) Abu Khalid Urduni † (Amir of al-Bab)	Muhammad Ahmed (Jarabulus Military Council commander) Adnan Abu Amjad (Manbij Military Council commander)

Units involved
- Orders of battle

Strength
(Turkey) 4,000–8,000 troops Unit Strengths: 20–80 MBTs; 20+ APCs; Unknown number of T-155 Fırtına Howitzers; Unknown number of T-122 Sakarya Rocket artillery; Bayraktar Tactical UAS; (Syrian opposition) : 10,000–12,000 fighters	5,000–7,000+ militants	Unknown

Casualties and losses
(Turkey) 71 killed (Syrian opposition) 614 killed	2,647 killed, 413 captured (per Turkey)	131+ killed (per SOHR and SDF) 425 killed, 37 captured (per Turkey); 30+ killed, 22 captured
- 540+ civilians killed (per SOHR)

Operation Euphrates Shield (Turkish: Fırat Kalkanı Harekâtı) was an offensive by the Turkish Armed Forces and the Turkish-backed Free Syrian Army, which led to the Turkish occupation of northern Syria. Operations were carried out in the region between the Euphrates river to the east and the rebel-held area around Azaz to the west. The Turkish military and Turkey-aligned Syrian rebel groups, some of which used the Free Syrian Army label, fought against the forces of the Islamic State (IS) as well as against the Syrian Democratic Forces (SDF) from 24 August 2016. On 29 March 2017, the Turkish military officially announced that Operation Euphrates Shield was "successfully completed".

The Turkish president Recep Tayyip Erdoğan said on the first day of the operation that it was aimed against both the IS and Syrian Kurdish "terror groups that threaten our country in northern Syria". The objective to capture Manbij, under the de facto control of the AANES administration, that had been promulgated by the Turkish president at the end of February 2017 remained unfulfilled.

== Background ==
Northern Aleppo Governorate is a region of major strategic importance in the Syrian civil war, previously mostly held by the Islamic State (IS). For IS it was their only gate to the Turkish border. For the Syrian Democratic Forces (SDF), the Shahba region between the Euphrates River to the east and the Kurd Mountains to the west is the missing link to connect the cantons of the Federation of Northern Syria – Rojava. For Turkey, it is the path to its influence in Syria. The stage for the Jarabulus offensive was set by the previous Manbij offensive from June–August, which saw the SDF capturing the city of Manbij and its surroundings from ISIL and in the aftermath moving north. At the same time, Turkey-backed Syrian rebels fought the Battle of al-Rai to approach Jarabulus from the west.

According to an article published in The Independent, the Turkish objectives were to target ISIL, strike at the political and military power of the Democratic Union Party (PYD) and to consolidate its position in expectation of shifts towards more war or greater peace. Turkey's defence minister Fikri Işık said that "preventing the Kurdish PYD party from uniting Kurdish cantons" east of Jarabulus with those further west was a priority. In Ankara Turkish president Recep Tayyip Erdoğan said "at 4 am this morning, operations started in the north of Syria against terror groups which constantly threaten our country".

Before the operation, SDF forces including People's Defense Units (YPG) units were advancing on Jarabulus following their military victory over the Islamic State in Manbij. Both Manbij and Jarabulus are west of the Euphrates River, but Turkey wanted YPG forces to move back to the east of the river after the conclusion of the SDF's Manbij operation.

Turkey's action pitched its military against a force backed by its NATO ally, the United States. It was the first time Turkish warplanes struck in Syria since November 2015, when Turkey downed a Russian warplane, and the first significant incursion by Turkish special forces since a brief operation to relocate the tomb of Suleyman Shah, in February 2015.

Pro-SDF sources stated that Turkey had "an agreement with IS " to rescue it in Jarabulus from the SDF offensive. According to Hürriyet Daily News this report is believed by "many" in Washington and Turkey and it could pose serious problems for Ankara.

== Preparations ==
Reportedly, Turkey had prepared battle plans for the intervention more than a year prior. On 9 May 2016, a plan was reportedly proposed by the US, Turkey, Saudi Arabia, and Qatar to have the Nour al-Din al-Zenki Movement form a "Northern Army" to gather more than 3,000 fighters for the operation. The next phase was to transfer the fighters from Idlib to northern Aleppo through the Bab al-Hawa Border Crossing and the Azaz border crossing. This reportedly began on 13 May. However, the plan was delayed due to doubts from U.S. officials about the capabilities of the Syrian rebel forces that Turkey had recruited to fight with its military, opposition from the US-backed Syrian Democratic Forces, and the rift between Turkey and Russia that was not mended until early August 2016.

On 20 August 2016, a large number of rebels and a military convoy containing more than 50 vehicles loaded with heavy and medium weapons from al-Rai were transferred to the Turkish border with Jarabulus. On 22 August, as a response to the Gaziantep bombing and two mortar shells launched by ISIL hitting the town of Karkamış adjacent to Jarabulus, the Turkish Land Forces launched 60 artillery shells at Islamic State positions in Jarabulus while simultaneously bombarding Manbij Military Council positions farther south in order to prevent them from advancing further to the north. Karkamış was soon evacuated and cleared of its residents. The Morning Star reported that Turkey continued to shell ISIL positions in Jarabulus after two mortar rounds hit Karkamış and three hit Kilis. On 23 August, Turkey shelled Islamic State territory in northern Syria again. IS responded by firing rockets into Turkey.

The Turkey-backed rebels under the brand of the Free Syrian Army (FSA) that took part in the offensive comprised mainly Syrian Turkmen, mostly in the Syrian Turkmen Brigades. During the offensive, FSA militants of Turkmen origin used light blue armbands, a color which is often used as a symbol of Turkic heritage; meanwhile, the rebels of Arab origin mainly used red ones.

The SDF have said that MIT assassinated Abdel Sattar al-Jader, the leader of the Jarabulus Military Council (a component of the SDF), just prior to the operation.

== The campaign ==
=== Capture of Jarabulus by Turkish-backed forces (24 August) ===
Early in the morning of 24 August, Turkish forces directed intense artillery fire against IS positions in Jarabulus while the Turkish Air Force bombed 11 targets from the air. Later that day, Turkish main battle tanks followed by pick-up trucks, believed to be carrying Turkish-backed Syrian rebels, and the Turkish Special Forces crossed the border and were joined by hundreds of Free Syrian Army (FSA) fighters as the ground forces attacked the town. U.S.-led coalition planes helped the Turkish forces. This was their first co-ordinated offensive into Syria. The FSA said progress was slow because of mines planted by IS fighters.

A few hours after the offensive's beginning, Turkish Special Forces and the Sham Legion captured their first village, Tal Katlijah, after IS fighters retreated from it to reinforce Jarabulus. Some time later, the FSA captured four more villages including Tel Shair, Alwaniyah and two other villages. Hours later, Turkish- and US-backed rebels were reported to have captured the border town of Jarabulus, with IS offering little resistance. The Syrian Observatory for Human Rights (SOHR) also reported that the FSA had captured almost all of the city. A FSA spokesman stated that a large number of IS fighters had withdrawn to al-Bab in front of the offensive.

The fact that not much combat took place between Turkey or Turkish-backed Syrian rebels against IS in Jarabulus and the closeness in Islamist political ideology between IS and some of the rebel groups involved, has led to accusations, both local and international, about collusion between Turkey and IS in the operation, including reports of IS fighters changing uniform. In an interview published in The Independent on 9 September, an IS fighter said that "when the Turkish army entered Jarabulus, I talked to my friends who were there. Actually, Isis didn't leave Jarabulus; they just shaved off their beards."

=== Continued advance of Turkish-backed forces against ISIL and conflict with SDF (24–25 August) ===
Later on 24 August, speaking in Ankara, US vice president Joe Biden appeared to support Turkey's stance vis-a-vis the Syrian Kurds and said that "the elements that were part of the Syrian Democratic Forces, the YPG that participated, that they must go back across the river" (the Euphrates). The YPG, however, initially refused to withdraw from Manbij, while the pro-SDF Jarabulus Military Council groups declared that they would not give up their hometown to the Turkish-backed rebel groups which they considered "no different from ISIS". In consequence, when Turkish-backed FSA units, among them the Sham Legion and Nour al-Din al-Zenki Movement, forcibly attempted to enter the SDF-held village of Amarinah south of Jarabulus, they were met with resistance. Whereas the SDF stated to have repelled the assault, the rebels stated that they had captured the village. Before clashing with the SDF, the FSA had captured half a dozen villages.

On early 25 August, more than 20 Turkish tanks crossed the Syrian border. The U.S. foreign minister later informed his Turkish counterpart that the YPG had started withdrawing to the east of the Euphrates river. A spokesman for Operation Inherent Resolve later announced that the SDF had withdrawn across the Euphrates river in order to prepare for the Raqqa campaign. The YPG later separately announced it had withdrawn to the east of Euphrates and said all military command along with all YPG-held positions was handed over to the Manbij Military Council. Despite this, Turkey stated that some YPG units had not retreated, leading the Turkish military to shell the SDF with artillery and, according to Hürriyet Daily News, launch a drone strike against one YPG group. While the conflict between Turkey and SDF continued, members of the Jarabulus Military Council stated once again that they "will not allow some "mercenaries" to take over our city. We will liberate Jarabulus," with some stating that some of the Turkish-backed rebels were former IS fighters.

At approximately 11:00 pm local time that evening, internet censorship watchdog organization Turkey Blocks detected a nationwide social media blackout, restricting domestic and mobile services throughout Turkey. Analysts concluded that the blackout measure had almost certainly been implemented to restrict online sharing of sensitive war plans, as the offensive in Syria got under way, using newly amended wartime internet "killswitch" legislation.

Meanwhile, the offensive against IS continued, as both the Turkish-backed forces as well as SDF units took control of additional villages south of Jarabulus from IS. Pro-PYD sources stated that clashes had broken out among FSA groups in Jarabulus. Turkish Defence Minister Fikri Işık stated later in the day that FSA was clearing Jarabulus of any remaining IS militants. After Jarabulus was largely secured, rebel commanders declared conflicting targets for the further offensive; whereas the Levant Front announced that the rebels would next attempt to take Al-Bab, the Al-Moutasem Brigade and the Sultan Murad Division stated that the Turkish-backed forces would proceed west to break the IS siege of Mare', while Turkish media reported that the offensive aimed at securing a strip of territory along the Turkish-Syrian border. However, Ankara's forces pushed south and mostly focused on targeting Kurdish-led SDF forces.

=== Disputed YPG withdrawal; Turkish-backed rebels drive SDF south of the Sajur River (26–29 August) ===
On 26 August, Al-Masdar News stated that all YPG forces had actually withdrawn to the east of the Euphrates as result of the continued Turkish pressure, leaving all territory around Manbij under control of their allies within the SDF, though rebel forces later released photos of YPG ID cards and weapons reportedly taken in Amarna, suggesting that at least some YPG fighters remained around Manbij, if not all. On the next day Turkish planes bombed the SDF-aligned Jarabulus Military Council positions in the village of Amarna, 10 km south of Jarabulus. According to the SDF, civilian homes were also hit and the SDF avoided moving north to prevent escalation of the clashes. Turkish backed-rebel forces then attacked and captured the SDF-held villages of Mazaalah and Yousif Bayk, while also attempting to advance against the strategic significant hilltop of Amarna. In response to the attacks, mostly Arab SDF groups such as the Northern Sun Battalion announced that they would send reinforcements to help the Jarabulus Military Council. Later that day, one Turkish soldier was killed and three were wounded in an anti-tank missile attack on a Turkish tank south of Jarabulus. According to Turkish military sources the missile was fired from territory held by the SDF. The soldier's death was the first reported fatality on the Turkish side. Turkish forces retaliated with artillery fire.

Meanwhile, the Turkish-backed Free Syrian Army (TFSA) cleared Jarabulus of mines and explosives planted by ISIL militants before their withdrawal from the town. The Turkish Red Crescent started distributing food after landmines and other explosives had been cleared from the border between Karkamis in Turkey and Jarabulus in Syria. The humanitarian movement handed out various food supplies for around 5,000 people in the town. Taking advantage of the fighting between the SDF and the FSA, ISIL launched a massive counteroffensive and captured al-Rai, according to the Syrian Observatory for Human Rights (SOHR).

On 28 August, according to SOHR and Aleppo24, at least 20 civilians were killed and 50 wounded in Turkish artillery fire and air strikes on the village of Jeb el-Kussa, and another 28 were killed and 25 wounded in Turkish air strikes near the town of Al-Amarneh and the village of Saressat. At least four SDF fighters had also been killed and 15 injured in the Turkish bombardment of the two areas. Syrian monitoring groups reported that at least 70 people were killed over the weekend (27–28 August), most of whom were civilians, in the Turkish operations. Turkish officials didn't comment on the reported civilian death toll, except to say that commanders were taking all necessary measures to protect noncombatants. Turkey stated to have killed 25 PKK and YPG militants in the course of the airstrikes. Turkish-backed forces then began a major attack against the SDF positions, capturing Amarna and nearby Ain al-Bayda; rebel groups also stated to have taken the villages of Qusa, Balaban, Dabisa, Jeb el-Kussa, Suraysat, Umm Routha, Maghayer and Qiratah further south, though this could not be independently confirmed. The ANF News Agency published a video of two Turkish army tanks destroyed by SDF anti-tank missiles. Meanwhile, Turkish-backed Sham Legion fighters released footage showing them torturing SDF prisoners.

Some of the Syrian refugees, mainly Syrian Turkmen and Arabs who were living in the area which TFSA forces captured, returned to the Jarabulus area. Erdoğan stated that the necessary help would be given to other refugees who wished to return to their homeland and Turkish Minister of Foreign Affairs Mevlüt Çavuşoğlu said the YPG was committing ethnic cleansing in areas which were opposed to them.

On 29 August, Ibrahim Ibrahim, head of the Rojava Media Cell, stated that local forces in Jarabulus and Manbij were being reinforced but said reports that the YPG was reinforcing Manbij was false. Brett McGurk, the United States' envoy to the anti-IS coalition called the clashes between the SDF and Turkish-backed rebels a "source of deep concern". The spokesman for the Pentagon called for the YPG to pull back to the east of the river, which he stated had largely occurred. He also warned that such clashes enabled IS to find sanctuary and continue planning attacks. In the course of the day, Turkish-backed forces first captured all remaining SDF positions north of the Sajur River, and then proceeded to cross it to take three more villages, bringing the number of villages captured by the rebels to 21.

=== Rebel–SDF ceasefire attempt; Rebel fighting against ISIL continued (30 August – 2 September) ===
On 30 August, John Thomas, a spokesman for the US Central Command stated that Turkey and SDF had agreed to stop fighting each other and had opened communications with the United States as well as with each other. Jarabulus Military Council stated that it had reached a temporary ceasefire agreement with Turkey after mediation by the US-led anti-ISIL coalition. It also stated that the ceasefire had started around midnight of 29–30 August. On the same day, Turkey's foreign ministry said the U.S.' comments regarding the objectives of the Turkish military operation in Syria were unacceptable and that the country would continue its operations until it achieved the goal of eliminating "terrorist threats in the region". Turkish military sources and commander of a Syrian opposition group said a ceasefire had not taken effect. The commander stated however while there was a pause in the operation, it would resume shortly. The U.S. welcomed the putative pause in fighting. Later in the day, Turkish Armed Forces stated that a Turkish tank near Sajur river had been hit by a rocket. However, it was not clear who had carried out the attack. The Turkish military carried out a strike 45 minutes after the tank was hit and stated it had destroyed a group of "terrorists" west of Jarabulus. It also stated that it had carried out airstrikes against IS targets in Kulliyah in northern Syria. SOHR confirmed that there was a pause in fighting between the two groups around Jarabulus and Sajor river. General Joseph Votel meanwhile stated that Kurdish fighters had moved to east of Euphrates as per their commitment.

Also on 30 August, SDF forces with coalition support started the Western al-Bab offensive against IS in the southwest of the region.

On 31 August, Turkey's officials rejected the announcement of ceasefire made by the U.S. shortly prior, saying Turkey would not accept any compromise or ceasefire between Turkey and what Turkey saw as terrorist elements. Turkish prime minister Binali Yıldırım said that "operations will continue until all terrorist elements have been neutralised, until all threats to our borders, our lands and our citizens are completely over". Meanwhile, IS launched a massive counterattack in the southwestern countryside of Jarabulus preceded by a suicide attack. The militants captured four villages (Kiliyeh, Arab Hasan Saghir, Al-Muhsinli, and Al-Bulduq) from both the SDF and Turkish-backed rebels. Two Turkish tanks were reportedly destroyed in the clashes.

On 1 September 2016, explosive experts of the Turkish Armed Forces cleared mines from the area around Jarabulus using controlled explosions. The de-mining operation on the Syrian side of the border was visible from the Turkish border town of Karkamış. An AFP photographer nearby heard at least a dozen explosions.

Turkish prime minister's spokesman said the Turkish government would treat foreign volunteers as terrorists, and Yasin Aktay, a spokesman for Turkey's ruling Justice and Development Party (AKP), speaking to Middle East Eye opined that when it comes to Europeans or Americans joining the YPG, they could only be considered "crusaders" or intelligence agents. Macer Gifford, a prominent British volunteer with the YPG and leader of its medical unit was quoted as saying "only in the minds of right wing and nationalist politicians in Turkey could the volunteers ever be called terrorists"; he said that while he had no intention to fight against Turkey, he would do so if and when Turkey attacked the YPG.

Later on 2 September 2016, a statement released by the Turkish military said that a total of 271 targets were hit 1195 times by the Turkish Armed Forces and the Free Syrian Army while anti-IS coalition jets struck two IS targets. Also, the Turkish-backed FSA captured the Syrian village of Qundarah from IS. The Turkish military also said that the Turkish Air Force destroyed three buildings used by IS in Arab Ezza and Qundarah with airstrikes.

Also on 2 September, the leader of a SDF component group Liberation Brigade, Abdul Karim Obeid, defected to the camp of Turkish-backed rebels with 20 to 50 of his men, citing opposition to reported YPG domination of the SDF, while SDF sources suggested: "he was displeased with the civil administration of the Federation of Northern Syria – Rojava replacing "warlordist" political rule".

=== Turkey enters the rebel's al-Rai front against IS (3–19 September) ===
Territorial control in northern Aleppo, as of 3 September 2016

On 3 September, Turkey additionally deployed tanks to the Syrian town of al-Rai to help the Turkish-backed rebels to push east from the town towards villages captured by the rebels west of Jarabulus. The incursion was launched from Kilis Province which had been frequently targeted with rocket attacks from IS. The Sham Legion and the Hamza Division also announced they had captured four villages (Fursan, Lilawa, Kino and Najma) south of Arab Ezza. The United States stated that it had hit IS targets near the Turkey-Syria border via the newly deployed HIMARS system. The Turkish armed forces meanwhile reported that the rebels had captured two villages and an airport near al-Rai. An official of the Fastaqim Kama Umirt also stated that the rebels had captured eight villages to the east and south of the town. SOHR confirmed that the Turkish-backed rebels had captured three villages near the Sajur river with advances in two other villages. It also confirmed that the rebels had captured a village near al-Rai. The U.S. Embassy in Ankara said US forces hit IS targets overnight near Turkey's border with Syria using HIMARS located in Turkey.

On 4 September, Turkey declared that the Turkish-backed rebels had captured the last remaining IS held villages along the Turkish border, cutting off key supply lines used by the group to bring in foreign fighters, weapons and ammunition. The SOHR confirmed that the IS no longer controlled territory along the Turkish-Syrian border after Turkish-backed rebels captured the last remaining villages under control of the group.

On 5 September, nine more villages in northern Syria were cleared of IS by the Turkish-backed rebels as part of operation Euphrates Shield according to Turkish armed forces. On 6 September, Turkish military reported that two Turkish soldiers were killed in a rocket attack on two tanks by IS during clashes near al-Waqf village, while five soldiers were also wounded. In addition, two Turkish-backed rebels were also killed while another two were injured. One of the Turkish soldiers who was critically injured in the attack later succumbed to his injuries in a hospital. The village along with the Sadvi village was reported to have been captured by the rebels on the same day.

On 7 September, around 300 Syrians started to return to Jarabulus in Syria, after Turkish-backed rebels recaptured the region from IS, marking the first formal return of civilians since Turkey launched Operation Euphrates Shield. Meanwhile, Deputy Prime Minister of Turkey Nurettin Canikli stated that Syrian Kurdish fighters still hadn't completely withdrawn to the east of Euphrates river. Also according to ARA news report IS evacuated their headquarters in the city of al-Bab in Syria's Aleppo province.

On 8 September, it was reported that IS would evacuate its headquarters in al-Bab, as SDF continued their advance towards the city from the west, and Turkish-backed rebels also announced readiness to fight IS in al-Bab and other areas. The same day, Turkish fighter jets hit four IS targets in northern Syria as part of Euphrates Shield operation, published in a statement from the Turkish General Staff. Also on the same day Turkey's foreign minister repeated the call for a no-fly zone over northern Syria to boost security and allow more refugees to return home while enabling more local troops to be trained in their fight against IS fighters. However, the United States as in the years before rejected the idea of a "no-flight zone" in Syria.

On 9 September, Turkish military stated that three Turkish soldiers were killed in clashes with IS near the region of Tel el-Hawa while one soldier was injured. The Turkish army also shelled 15 IS positions in the Kafr Ghan region after a rocket from the region landed near Kilis Province. The military also stated that it carried out an air operation in Tal Ali, Tel al-Hawa and south Wuquf regions which destroyed 4 buildings being used as headquarters by the militants. An IS fighter was also stated to have been killed in an air operation conducted by the anti-IS coalition. On 10 September, the Turkish military stated that airstrikes conducted by it targeting 3 buildings in Tel el-Hawa resulted in the death of 20 IS fighters. On 13 September, Turkish military stated that the US-led coalition conducted airstrikes targeting four mortar positions and 2 defensive positions of IS between al-Rai and Azaz. The attack resulted in the deaths of 6 militants.

As of 14 September, a total of 1,900 Syrian refugees returned to the area cleansed by Turkish-backed forces, mainly to Jarabulus and Al Rai.

On 15 September, Turkish Armed Forces said that it had so far destroyed 26 mines and 671 improvised explosive devices (IEDs) planted by IS in northern Syria as part of operation Euphrates Shield.

On 16 September, US interference in al-Rai town caused the withdrawal of the Ahrar al-Sharqya Brigade from joining Euphrates Shield operation, the withdrawal came in protest against the US forces' interference in northern Aleppo. Earlier, US troops on gun trucks, followed by a Turkish tank and trucks carrying US-allied FSA fighters, withdrew from al-Rai back into Turkey after some fighters of Ahrar al-Sharqya, a Free Syrian Army labeled rebel group, denounced them as "infidels" and "Crusaders". Dozens of US forces continued to cooperate with Turkish soldiers in support of the operation. Meanwhile, the Turkish military stated that 5 fighters of FSA were killed while 6 were injured in an IED attack in Tatimus region. It also stated that 5 fighters of IS were killed in airstrikes carried out by anti-IS coalition in Kunaytirah, Tatimus, Cakka and Baragidah regions.

On 17 September the Mountain Hawks Brigade announced that it had withdrawn from the Jarabulus and al-Rai fronts and its fighters and equipment will be transferred to the fronts in Aleppo city, Hama, and Latakia. Meanwhile, Turkish military stated that 67 IS targets were hit with howitzer missiles and rockets between al-Rai and Azaz on the same day. It also stated that 5 fighters of the group were killed during the day.

IS launched a counter-attack targeting the Tal Hajjar hilltop near al-Rai on 19 September. Amaq stated that the hilltop was captured by IS.

=== Third phase of the operation: Dabiq offensive (20 September – 17 October) ===
Map of the wider Turkish-led operations in northern Aleppo

On 16 September, US special operations forces entered northern Aleppo as part of a new US mission known as "Operation Noble Lance." According to the Pentagon, they will provide training, advice and assistance to the Syrian rebels. Furthermore, the soldiers likely will also be used to call in US airstrikes in support of the rebels as they advance. On the same day, the Turkish military stated that 5 fighters of FSA were killed while 6 were injured in an IED attack in Tatimus region. It also stated that 5 fighters of IS were killed in airstrikes carried out by anti-IS coalition in Kunaytirah, Tatimus, Cakka and Baragidah regions.

As of 19 September Turkish forces and Turkish-backed rebels, the primary ground force being the Turkmen group Sultan Murad Division, took control of five new villages in the biggest advance of the third phase, making the total number of villages taken in this phase 10.

After Turkish Free Syrian Army(TFSA) units had captured a few villages from IS, By 23 September IS had recaptured more than 20 villages from the rebels.

Due to the rebel losses, the offensive was halted and the third phase of the Turkish operation was put on hold. A late September piece in Al-Monitor assessed the campaign as follows: "IS has recaptured scores of Turkmen villages south of Jarablus from FSA militias. (...) From the outset, there were doubts about whether Euphrates Shield could be sustained without the involvement of Turkish ground troops. It was not difficult to foresee that the biggest weakness was the inadequacy of the motley crew of jihadists assembled under the FSA banner. To make up for this deficiency, the Turkish army will have to deploy increasing numbers of troops to advance southward in Syria and thus into the quagmire."

In the immediate aftermath of the aborted offensive towards al-Bab, the TFSA and Turkey launched a new offensive towards the IS-held town of Dabiq. On 1 October, the Turkish Parliament extended the military operation's mandate for another year. The next day, Turkish-backed opposition forces started advancing; Turkmen villages Boztepe (Tallat al-Baydah), Türkmenbarı and Hurdanah were taken over by Turkish-backed rebel forces.

On 5 October, TFSA primarily driven by the Sultan Murad Division, took control of four more villages from IS and, with the Turkish Special Forces, entered the small and strategic town of Akhtarin, easing the way for the planned attack on Dabiq. The town was captured by them on 6 October.

After taking control of the supply route between Al-Bab and Dabiq by taking Akhtarin and its vicinity, on 9 October, Turkey and the affiliated rebels announced that the area between Mare, Akhtarin and Kafrghan, an area which contains two important IS-held locations, Sawran and Dabiq, a military zone.

On 10 October, Turkish forces and Turkish-backed rebels made significant advances and established control in all settlements on the way to the town of Sawran from its north and northwest, and started pushing into the town of Ihtamillat, the last settlement east of Sawran.

One week later, following heavy clashes around the area, on 16 October, the FSA, headed by Sultan Murad Division, first took control of Sawran, Syria and continued towards Dabiq. One day earlier, IS leader Baghdadi published a voice record stating that the "Dabiq War", which IS was using as ritual propaganda, "isn't this ongoing one". Soon after Sawran, full control in Dabiq was also taken and rebel forces went as south as Asunbul to secure the newly acquired area before proceeding to the next stage of the offensive targeting Qabasin and Bab.

=== Clashes between SDF, ISIS and rebels: western al-Bab offensive (18 October – 3 November) ===
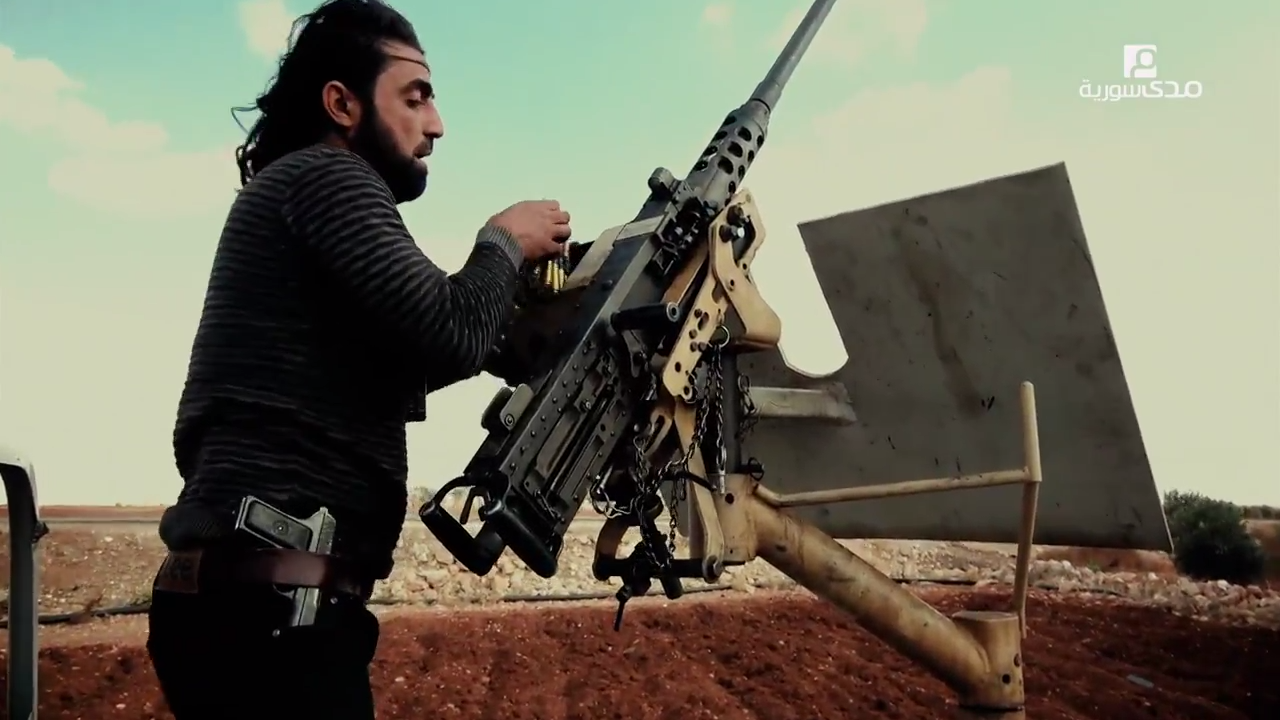
A Turkish-backed FSA fighter loads an M2 Browning during the fighting in northern Aleppo Governorate

On 18 October, the Northern Thunder Brigade issued an ultimatum to the "PKK" and the Army of Revolutionaries, warning them to leave Tell Rifaat within 48 hours after which they will attack the town. On 19 October, following capturing the last remaining IS-held villages between the control line of the SDF, Turkey-backed rebels started an offensive towards the SDF positions in Shahba region and Tell Rifaat with Turkish support. Following the first days of clashes and strikes, the Turkish army said that its air strikes have killed 160 to 200 YPG members with maximum care for civilians. Syrian government sources however reported around such a number of civilians killed. SDF sources reported 11 fighters from their ranks killed. SOHR stated that death toll was around 20, possible 4 civilians included.

On 22 October, first reports gains were announced by the rebel factions, namely 2 to 3 villages, which later turned out to be untrue. Turkish-backed rebels surrounded Shaykh Issa, just east of Tell Rifaat. Turkish artillery shelling and air strikes mainly focused on Tell Rifaat, Shaykh Issa and villages under SDF control in western al-Bab. Turkish tanks entered Syria also from the west, from Hatay region into Idlib region, to the southernmost point of the PYD-held Afrin canton and positioned on hills overlooking Tel Rifat and Afrin.

By 25 October, it became evident that the SDF had repelled all assaults by Turkish-backed rebels on villages and positions under its control. ANHA stated that the "failures and casualties" despite "major" Turkish support had "demoralized" rebel groups and caused their retreat from further attacks against the SDF. Of the commanders from the Northern Thunder Brigade who issued the ultimatum, one was reportedly killed in action and one was seriously injured. In a counterattack, the SDF stated to have captured two villages from the rebels.

=== Al-Bab (6 November 2016 – 23 February 2017) ===
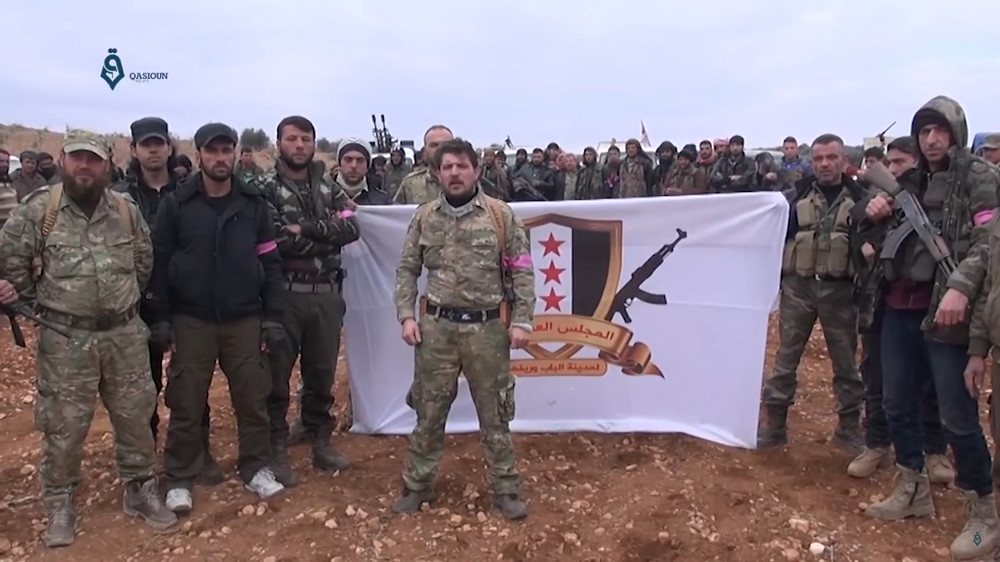
Al-Bab military council fighters during the Battle of al-Bab.

On 6 November, the rebels supported by Turkish planes and artillery advanced south towards al-Bab, entering the northern outskirts of the city on 14 November. The US-led coalition did not support the offensive due to it being an independent Turkish operation.

On 24 November, according to the Turkish military, the Syrian Arab Air Force conducted an airstrike against Turkish Special Operations Forces and aligned Turkish-backed rebels north of al-Bab, killing four Turkish soldiers and injuring 11 other, one seriously. While the Turkish prime minister's office has issued a temporary gag order on reporting about the airstrike, main opposition Republican People's Party (CHP) leader Kemal Kılıçdaroğlu called on the Turkish government to "act with common sense." Prime Minister Binali Yildirim issued a statement whereby he assured the aggression "will not be left unanswered" promising the Turkish military's determination to "clear the area of terrorists is unaffected by the move."

Turkish officials initially stated the casualties were due to an IS attack, before blaming the Syrian Air Force. However, the pro-opposition activist group the SOHR disputed it was an air-strike and stated it was in fact an IS suicide attack. Additionally, IS confirmed it conducted a suicide attack in the area. On 25 November, the Syrian airforce said that their jets have not bombed Turkish soldiers.

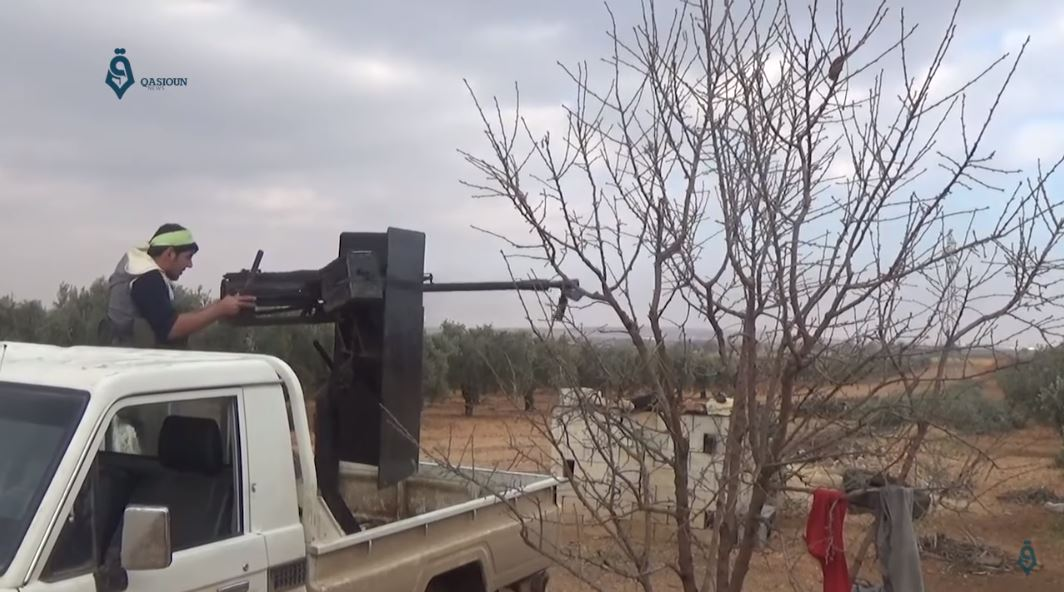
TFSA technical in the outskirts of al-Bab

On 8 January 2017, the New York Times reported that momentum gained with the ouster of Daesh from Jarablus was stalled at al-Bab due to heavy resistance and an inexplicable lack of U.S. air support. In response, the Turkish government sought aid from Russian airstrikes against ISIS positions.

On 2 February 2017, Sky News reported that Turkish aircraft killed 51 IS fighters in the space of 24 hours in the areas of al Bab, Tadif, Kabbasin and Bzagah, the airstrikes targeted buildings and vehicles resulting in 85 IS positions destroyed.

On 7 February 2017, clashes erupted between the SDF and Euphrates Shield Forces in the town of Tokhar north of Manbij and south of Jarabulus. The former stated to have repelled SDF's attempt to advance in the town.

On 9 February 2017, a Russian air strike on a building accidentally killed 3 Turkish soldiers and wounded 11 more in a friendly fire incident near al-Bab, who were supporting the Syrian rebels in the battle for the city. The BBC report added that the Kremlin issued a statement that President Putin had, in a telephone call with his Turkish counterpart, "expressed condolences over a tragic incident which resulted in the deaths of several Turkish troops in the al-Bab area" and that two leaders agreed to "increase military co-operation during operations in Syria against IS militants and other extremist organisations."

On 14 February 2017, Turkish forces started shelling SDF-held Tell Rifaat with mortars and heavy artillery. The offensive continued the next day. Kurdish officials condemned the violations. Al-Bab was completely captured from IS by Turkish-backed rebels on 23 February, along with the towns of Qabasin and Bizaah. On 25 February, IS began to retreat from the town of Tadef, with the Syrian Army capturing the town on the following day.

=== Tadef and clashes with SDF around Manbij (28 February – 25 March) ===

On 26 February 2017, Turkey's protests notwithstanding, the U.S. announced its support for the Manbij Military Council, established by the YPG-dominated Syrian Democratic Forces, and sent special forces and several military convoys to Manbij. On 28 February, Turkish president Erdogan announced that the Turkish-backed forces would assault Manbij after completing their operations in al-Bab as originally planned. He called for the YPG to be moved to the east of the river and ruled out any cooperation with the SDF. Clashes erupted between both sides, with the Turkish-supported rebels quickly advancing through five villages west of the city. On 2 March, the Manbij Military Council announced that it had reached an agreement with Russia to hand over villages to the west of Manbij to the Syrian government in the coming days in order to protect them from being assaulted by Turkish-backed forces. Turkey's foreign minister Mevlüt Çavuşoğlu requested from the United States to force Kurdish troops to withdraw from Manbij. The SDF later launched a counter-attack, retaking several villages that had been captured by the rebels a day earlier. The Russian General Staff's Sergey Rudosky as well as the United States Department of Defense confirmed on 3 March that the SDF had agreed to hand over villages to the west of Manbij to the Syrian government. Russia and the Syrian government also sent a humanitarian convoy following the deal, which the United States Department of Defense stated also contained military equipment. Rudosky later stated that Syrian Army units had been deployed in the villages under agreement. On 4 March, United States special operations forces were also deployed in Manbij in response to the clashes. The United States military stated that it was done to deter hostile acts, enhance governance and ensure there's no persistent YPG presence.

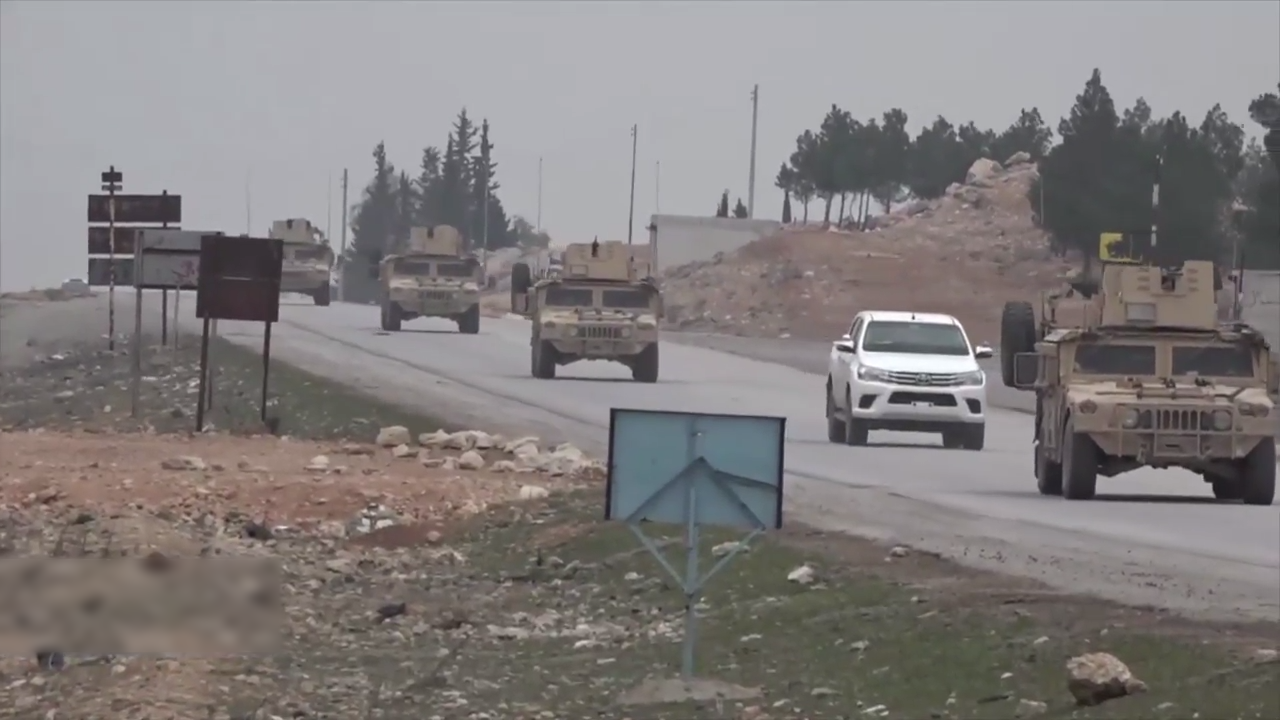
US Humvees drive through a SDF-controlled village near Manbij in an attempt to "deter" the skirmishes between the SDF and Turkish-backed forces

On 6 March, Manbij Military Council spokesman Sharfan Darwish said that the U.S.-led anti-ISIL coalition had boosted its presence in Manbij in response to the clashes between SDF and Turkish-backed forces. He stated that they hadn't requested any reinforcements from SDF or YPG and also added that the implementation of the deal regarding the villages near Manbij had been delayed but it remained in place. He later stated that Syrian Army had taken over positions on one part of the frontline with the Turkish-backed rebels. According to Wladimir van Wilgenburg, Prime Minister Yıldırım meanwhile said that Turkey might abandon its offensive on Manbij since there was no Russian or American support. Clashes were again reported with pro-rebel media stating that the rebels had captured a village to the west of Manbij, pro-Kurdish media however rejected this, saying the attack was repelled. United States Chairman of the Joint Chiefs of Staff Joseph Dunford, Russia's Chief of the General Staff Valery Gerasimov, and Turkey's Chief of the General Staff Hulusi Akar held a joint meeting on 7 March to defuse escalations around Manbij and discussed joint issues relating to regional security. Turkish Defense Minister Fikri Işik stated on 16 March that finding a diplomatic solution with the United States and Russia on Manbij was necessary and a military approach would only be considered if diplomacy failed.

On 25 March, the SAA reported that the Turkish-backed rebels had not taken Tadef, stating that they still controlled the town, though the rebel forces had advanced on the town's northern edges and clashes erupted.

== International reactions ==
=== Belligerent sides ===
- Turkey: Turkey Justified the operation as an act of self-defence, in response to ISIS shelling of Turkish border towns and suicide bombings and attacks targeting Turkish nationals and also that "Our border must be completely cleansed of Daesh (ISIS)". while Turkish Defence Minister Fikri Isik stated that "preventing the PYD party from uniting the PYD cantons east of Jarabulus with those further west was a priority." Turkish foreign minister, Mevlüt Çavuşoğlu, said that YPG should return east of Syria's Euphrates River. Both Manbij and Jarabulus are west of the river. On 25 August 2016, the largest opposition party in Turkey, Republican People's Party (CHP), publicly supported Operation Euphrates Shield, calling it "long overdue", while "calling on the government to engage in a sincere fight against ISIL, not just in Jarabulus, but inside our own borders". On 2 September 2016, Turkish president Recep Tayyip Erdoğan said that "the PYD forces had not yet retreated to the east of the Euphrates River in northern Syria despite statements by the US that the group was withdrawing." Furthermore, claimed that Turkey's operation into Jarabulus was not an incursion and it was conducted to resettle the local Arab and Turkmen population back into their towns.

=== UN-member states ===
- Azerbaijan: Qənirə Paşayeva, member of parliament, said on 3 September that Turkey would have an obligation to protect the civilians in northern Syria from terror groups and would have the right to protect itself from the attacks originating from Syria with the intervention.
- Bulgaria: Prime minister Boyko Borisov on 26 August said: "The Turkish Armed Forces have probably prevented a probable new migration wave of 2 million people with the Euphrates Shield operation in Syria's Jarablus with the coalition."
- Cyprus: The Cyprus House of Representatives on 9 September unanimously adopted a resolution condemning "the unacceptable invasion of Turkey into Syria, under the pretext of war against terrorism." It also called on the international community to demand Turkey's withdrawal from Syria.
- France: On 30 August President Francois Hollande criticized Turkey's "contradictory" military operation in Syria, saying he could understand Turkey's concern about protecting its borders and fighting IS, but criticized Ankara's actions against the People's Protection Units (YPG).
- Germany: On 24 August, the German foreign ministry spokesperson supported Turkey's action against "terrorist activities" in northern Syria. Furthermore, it added that the Euphrates Shield operation was part of international efforts to overcome IS in the region. However, on 28 August the foreign minister Frank-Walter Steinmeier condemned Turkish attacks against the SDF and pointed out that Turkey has to join the war against ISIS not to fight Syrian Kurds, while also condemning PKK attacks in Turkey.
- Iran: Iranian foreign ministry spokesman Bahram Ghasemi on 31 August urged Ankara to quickly wrap up its military intervention in Syria, saying it was an "unacceptable" violation of Syrian sovereignty.
- Israel: Israeli ambassador in Ankara Amira Oron said that Turkey's concerns in regards to fighting Islamic State (IS) are legitimate.
- Netherlands: The Dutch Minister of Foreign Affairs Bert Koenders on 28 August called for Turkey and Syrian Kurds to work against IS instead of fighting amongst themselves and Syrian Kurdish groups to be included in the peace talks. Nevertheless, he called the PKK a terrorist organization and it should be looked into which Kurdish representatives will participate in the talks. On 8 September, a representation office of the Federation of Northern Syria – Rojava was inaugurated in The Hague.
- Russia: Russia's foreign ministry on 24 August said in a statement that Moscow was deeply worried by the escalation of tension on the Turkish-Syria border. On 6 September, Russian president Vladimir Putin speaking at a press conference following the G20 Hangzhou summit in China said that: "Turkey's operation in Syria was not something unexpected for us. Foreign Affairs and Intelligence exist so that we face fewer unexpected developments. We understood what was going on and where things would lead." On 21 October foreign minister Lavrov expressed Russia's concern with Turkish attacks on SDF forces and called on Turkey to focus on fighting IS and Al-Nusra Front.
- Saudi Arabia: Saudi Arabia's foreign minister Adel al-Jubeir reiterated on 9 September his country's full backing of Turkish military operations in northern Syria against ISIL, YPG, and suggested a military solution remained the strongest option to get rid of Syria's president, Bashar al-Assad.
- Syria: The Syrian foreign ministry on 25 August condemned "this blatant breach to its sovereignty" by Turkey. Syria said: "Fighting terrorism on Syrian territory from any side should have been coordinated with Syrian government and the Syrian army that has been fighting in these battles for five years". Also, added that "substituting (ISIS) with other terrorist organizations backed directly by Turkey" is not "fighting terrorism." On 2 September, the Ministry of Education of Syria announced that it resumes teaching in the schools of Manbij, which was then reported starting at 28 September. In an interview with the state-run Syrian Arab News Agency on 8 December 2016, Syria President Bashar al-Assad said that "as long as the Turkish policy is run by an abnormal and psychologically disturbed person like Erdogan, we have to expect all possibilities."
- United States: US vice-president Joe Biden in the early days of the Turkish offensive publicly warned YPG forces in Syria that they would lose US support if they fail to "go back across the river" (east of the Euphrates). Biden arrived in Turkey instead of John Kerry in a move seen as an "upgrade" of the U.S. diplomatic mission. As Turkey launched a major attack against the SDF on 28 August, the Pentagon refused to comment, other than stating that the SDF remained an important partner in the war against IS. On 29 August, CENTCOM stated that it had no involvement in Turkish or Turkish backed rebel activities against the SDF. On the same day, the U.S. military voiced its "concern" over the clashes between Turkey and Kurdish-aligned forces in Syria. On 31 August, the U.S. said Turkey's actions after taking Jarabulus were "unacceptable" and CENTCOM commander Joseph Votel said that the U.S. will continue to support the YPG. On 2 September 2016, U.S. president Barack Obama said ahead of the G20 summit in Hangzhou, China that "Turkey continues to be strong NATO ally, they are working with us to defeat IS." On 27 October, U.S. Senator John McCain, Chairman of the Senate Armed Services Committee, released a statement saying that "the Turkish government's continued attacks on Syrian Kurds are destabilizing and troubling. (...) I urge the Turkish government to refrain from further attacks against Kurdish groups in Syria."

=== Supranational organizations ===
- European Union: Elmar Brok, member of the European Parliament for the German CDU party and the chairman of the European Parliament Committee on Foreign Affairs said that "the PYD should remain on the east bank of the Euphrates river" and "shouldn't use the fight against IS as an excuse to take hold of Arab regions. They have no business there." In another interview, he suggested that "Kurds must concentrate on the territory east of the Euphrates, and Turkey must recognize that".
- NATO: NATO Secretary General Jens Stoltenberg arrived in Ankara for a two-day visit on 8 September, as a sign of support for the Turkish people and their democracy. Jens Stoltenberg said also that the military alliance supports Ankara in its campaign to protect its borders. "We welcome Turkey's increasing efforts to fight against IS. Turkey has a right to defend itself. There have been many terrorist attacks coming from the Syrian side."
- United Nations: During a visit to the city of Hangzhou in China to attend the G20 summit, UN Secretary-General Ban Ki-moon emphasized the key role of Turkey in the fight against IS.

=== Other regional actors ===
- Iraqi Kurdistan: The head of the Iraqi autonomous Kurdistan Region, Massoud Barzani, said on 24 August that Iraqi Kurdistan and Turkey had agreed on a strategy to fight IS. On 15 September, when asked about Turkey's military intervention and PYD; Barzani said PYD was "seizing" areas in Syria and following outlawed PKK's policies. "Due to its non-inclusive policies, the PYD does not enjoy the support of other elements in Syria and continues to support Syria's Assad regime without any thought for the future of the Kurds in the region." Barzani stated. Barzani's political affiliation, KDP, doesn't recognize PYD as representative of Kurds in Syria.
- Rojava: Hediya Yousef, co-chairwoman of the constitutional assembly of the Federation of Northern Syria – Rojava, said that "we have decided to convene a meeting of the founding assembly of the federal system at the start of October, and we will declare our system in northern Syria. We will not retreat from this project. On the contrary, we will work to implement it. The Turkish intervention will not obstruct us." The Shahba region civilian council condemned the occupation of Jarabulus as a Turkish attempt to expand into Syria, likening it to the Battle of Marj Dabiq and suggesting that Jarabulus would become a "grave for the criminal occupier Erdoğan and his mercenaries". Among SDF component groups, YPG forces said that the Turkish operation is motivated more by the desire to stop the SDF's advance in northwestern Syria than by anti-IS sentiment.
- (Syrian opposition) Syrian National Coalition: The National Coalition for Syrian Revolutionary and Opposition Forces commended Turkey and other countries participating in anti-IS coalition for their support of the rebel offensive on Jarabulus town. The Syrian National Coalition stated foreign military presence in and around Jarabulus to be temporary and limited to the provision of logistical support.
  - Syrian Turkmen councilhead Emin Bozoğlan said that "the Turkmen minority feels threatened both by IS and the PYD." Furthermore, he stated that the "Turkmen minority is calling for an expansion of the offensive until northern Aleppo and Manbij are completely in control of the Turkish Armed Forces and the Free Syrian Army that it backs." On an interview, Bozoğlan also stated "Turkmens hope that operations will also save other important Turkmen regions in Tel Abyad area occupied by YPG and in Latakia area under control of the Assad government".

(Kurdistan Region) The Kurdish National Council in Syria condemned the "indiscriminate" Turkish bombings on populated towns such as Jindires and other towns in the northern Aleppo Government. The council stated that "the Turkish Army and allied Islamist rebels have been killing civilians, carrying out indiscriminate shelling and airstrikes on populated areas." and demanded the Turkish Armed Forces to withdraw its forces. A KNC member also denounced the Turkish focus on attacking the SDF.

== See also ==
- Turkish involvement in the Syrian Civil War
- Operation Olive Branch
- Operation Peace Spring
- Battle of al-Rai (August 2016)
- Terrorism in Turkey
- Turkey–ISIL conflict
- Western al-Bab offensive (September 2016)
- Battle of al-Bab
- List of wars involving Turkey
- Spillover of the Syrian civil war

== Notes ==
a: Only against ISIL
b: Part of Syrian Turkmen Brigades as well
