= Hawar Kilis Operations Room =

Syrian-Turkmen coalition part of the Syrian Opposition

- غرفة عمليات حوار كلس
- Leader: Mohamed Dheere
- Dates active: April 2016—January 2025
- Headquarters: Hawar Kilis
- Active regions: Aleppo Governorate
- Size: 10,000–12,000 fighters
- Part of: (Syrian opposition) Free Syrian Army (Syrian opposition) Syrian National Army
- Wars: Syrian Civil War
- Website: https://twitter.com/houar_m_o

The Hawar Kilis Operations Room (Arabic: غرفة عمليات حوار كلس, Turkish: Havar Kilis Operasyon Odası) was a Syrian rebel coalition formed in the village of Hawar Kilis in April 2016 in the northern Aleppo Governorate on the Syria–Turkey border.

As part of the Syrian Train and Equip Program, many groups in the coalition were supplied with Thuraya satellite phones by the United States.

Most factions within the operations room form a large component of the Syrian National Army, which was, with Turkish backing, formed around the Operations Room.

== Member groups ==
- Victory Bloc
  - Sham Legion (Northern Aleppo branch)
    - Free North Brigade
    - Sham Commandos Brigade
      - Sons of Waer Battalion
      - Revolutionaries of Waer Battalion
    - Nour al-Din al-Zenki Movement (Northern Aleppo branch)
  - Elite Division
  - Ahrar al-Sharqiya
  - Jaysh al-Nukhba (Northern Aleppo branch)
    - Elite Battalion
  - First Regiment
  - 5th Regiment
  - Jaysh al-Ahfad
  - Authenticity and Development Front (northern Aleppo branch)
- Sultan Murad Bloc
  - Sultan Murad Division
  - Hamza Division
  - Al-Mu'tasim Brigade
  - Sultan Othman Brigade
  - Mustafa Regiment
  - 23rd Division (northern Aleppo branch)
  - Sultan Suleyman Shah Brigade
  - Maghawir Brigade
  - Northern Falcons Brigade
  - Jazeera Revolutionaries
  - Northern Brigade
    - Revolutionary Knights Brigade
      - Free Syria Brigade
    - Swords of Shahba Brigade
      - Manbij Revolutionaries Gathering
      - Soldiers of Mercy Battalion
      - Martyr Alaa Abu Zaid Battalion
      - Honest Dawn Battalion
      - Sirajuddin Battalion
      - Supporters of God Battalion
      - Omar Abu al-Hasan Battalion
      - Commandos of the Sunna Battalions
      - Commandos of Islam Brigade
      - Zubayr ibn al-Awwam Battalion
      - Al-Rafidayn al-Aeamila Battalion
      - Qiba Martyrs Battalion
      - Northern Commando Battalion
      - Jarabulus Martyrs Battalion
      - Martyr Alaa Barir Battalion
- Levant Bloc
  - Levant Front
    - Conquest Brigade
    - Northern Storm Brigade
    - Ahrar al-Sham Eastern Sector
- Fastaqim Union
- 51st Brigade
- Islamic Freedom Battalions
- First Squad of Aleppo

== Structure ==
The Hawar Kilis Operations Room consists of three military "blocs": the Victory Bloc, the Sultan Murad Bloc, and the Levant Bloc. At the end of October 2016, a security committee was formed to man checkpoints in the villages and towns it controls. A judicial committee to supervise courts was also established.

== History ==
The coalition took part in the northern Aleppo offensive, beginning with April 2016, and captured several villages in northern Aleppo overlooking al-Rai from ISIL, before entering al-Rai itself. However, ISIL soon launched a large-scale counteroffensive and recaptured most of the villages, including al-Rai.

In early October 2016 the group formed the Akhtarin Military Council which captured several villages and the town of Akhtarin from ISIL as part of the 2016 Dabiq offensive, ending with the capture of Dabiq and several more other villages, linking Mare' with al-Rai.

On 28 October the group formed the "Victory Bloc" operations room during the western al-Bab offensive.

On 28 January 2017, after the formation of Tahrir al-Sham which the Nour al-Din al-Zenki Movement's main branch became part of, the Zenki Movement's northern Aleppo branch working with Hawar Kilis Operations Room defected to the Sham Legion and formed the Revolutionary Knights Brigade.

On 7 June 2017, a unit in the Hawar Kilis Operations Room defected to the Syrian Democratic Forces.

In July 2017, the commander of Liwa Ahfad Saladin, Mahmoud Khallo, declared that the group would not participate in a planned Turkish-led offensive against the SDF in the Afrin Canton and the Shahba region. Following the announcement, the group was arrested and disarmed by the Levant Front and the Turkish Army. After being released soon after, Khallo protested against his unit's treatment and criticized that Turkey was apparently only interested in using the Syrian militias to further its own strategic goals. He also said that Liwa Ahfad Saladin, now without weapons, would set up a political party.

On 26 August 2017, the Hawar Kilis Operations Room condemned Riad al-Asaad and accused him of conspiring with al-Qaeda after he attended a conference held by Tahrir al-Sham in Idlib.
