= Sultan Murad Division =

Syrian Turkmen Rebel Group

- لواء السلطان مراد / Sultan Murat Tümeni
- Flag used by the Division
- Leaders: Col. Ahmad Othman (Ahmet Osman); Fahim Issa (Fehim İsa); Ali Şeyh Salih (DOW); Fayez al-Droush †; Mahmut Shaban Suleiman
- Dates active: 28 March 2013– 13 October 2025
- Groups: Sultan Murad Brigade; Sultan Murad Battalion; Martyr Zaki Turkmani Brigade; Ashbal Akida Brigade; Sultan Malik-Shah Brigade; Homs Revolutionary Union; Homs al-Adiya Brigades (former)
- Headquarters: Bustan al-Basha, Aleppo (destroyed in November 2016); Al-Bab (since 2017)
- Active regions: Syria; Libya (since 2019); Azerbaijan (2020); Niger (since 2024); Togo (since 2024); Burkina Faso (since 2024)
- Ideology: Turanism; Neo-Ottomanism
- Size: 1,300 (2013); 550+ (2016); 9000 (2021, claimed)
- Part of: (Syrian opposition) Free Syrian Army (Syrian opposition) Syrian National Army (2017–2025): Syrian Turkmen Brigades (2015–2025); Dawn of Freedom Operations Room; Ansar al-Sharia (Syria) (2015–16); Fatah Halab (2015–16); Mare' Operations Room (2015-2016); Hawar Kilis Operations Room (2016–2025)
- Website: http://sultanmurattumeni.com

The Sultan Murad Division (Arabic: فرقة السلطان مراد; Firqat al-Sultan Murad; Turkish: Sultan Murat Tümeni) was a Syrian Turkmen rebel group fighting in the Syrian civil war. It was aligned with the Syrian Interim Government and heavily supported by Turkey, which provides funding and military training along with artillery and aerial support. It was the most notable group among the Syrian Turkmen Brigades also supported by Turkey. During the integration of Syrian rebel factions in 2025, the Sultan Murad Division was reorganized into the 72nd Division.

== Ideology and structure ==
The Sultan Murad Division is one of several Syrian rebel groups that support or at least tolerate Islamist, Turkish nationalist, or pan-Turkic ideologies like Neo-Ottomanism and Turanism.

Among the commanders of the group are Ahmed Othman, Fahim Issa and Ali Şeyh Salih, who is an ethnic Arab.

== Equipment ==
Among the Syrian rebel groups participating in the Turkish military intervention in Syria, the Sultan Murad Division is the group that receives the most support from the Turkish Armed Forces. It operates at least 8 FNSS ACV-15 armoured personnel carriers during the operation. The group also operate Milkor MGL grenade launchers.

The main heavy weapons of the group consist of technical vehicles armed with heavy machine guns and autocannons. Previously it has also received BGM-71 TOW anti-tank missiles from the United States, although more support is given by Turkey than the US since the former's intervention.

== History ==
The Sultan Murad Brigade was formed in early 2013 and mainly operated in the Aleppo Governorate. By 2016, the group claimed to have around 1,300 fighters.

In February 2016, it joined the Jaysh Halab rebel coalition led by Ahrar al-Sham. The coalition clashed with Jaysh al-Thuwar (JaT), an FSA group affiliated to the Kurdish-led Syrian Democratic Forces. A high-ranking military JaT commander "Abu Udai Menagh" was reported to have defected to the Sultan Murad Division in August 2016.

It fought against ISIL in the Northern Aleppo offensive (February 2016) and the Northern Aleppo offensive (March–June 2016). In August 2016, it captured al-Rai from ISIL in the Battle of al-Rai (August 2016). In February 2017, it captured al-Bab from ISIL.

=== Syrian National Army ===
It took part in the Turkish military intervention in Syria. In mid-2017, it was under the command of Fahim Issa and was part of the Hawar Kilis Operations Room, which received ground support from Turkish artillery. It formed the "Sultan Murad Bloc" with other units within the Syrian National Army (SNA). In November 2017, it was reported that Sultan Murad's commander Fahim Issa was appointed as the overall commander of the Hawar Kilis Operation Room, as well as of the Sultan Murad Bloc within it. The Bloc consisted of Turkmen and Arab units including Jabhat Turkmen Souriya.

Between 4 and 15 June 2017, heavy fighting broke out between SNA factions led by the Sultan Murad Division and Ahrar al-Sham and its allies in and near al-Bab. By 15 June 33 people were killed and 55 injured in the infighting. On 8 June, between 60 and 70 SNA fighters, including several Sultan Murad Division commanders, defected to the Syrian Army and the Syrian Democratic Forces during the clashes. According to the Hawar Kilis Operations Room, the unit led by Abu al-Kheir al-Munbaji that defected to the government had run criminal activities and was supposed to be arrested when it deserted.

In June 2019, it captured Australian ISIL member Mohamed Zuhbi near Afrin, holding him for three months before handing him to Turkey for trial.

In late 2019, it took part in Operation Peace Spring, a Turkish-led offensive against the Kurdish-led Syrian Democratic Forces (SDF).

In early November 2019, according to the Syrian Observatory for Human Rights, the Homs al-Adiyyeh Brigade of the Sultan Murad Division defected to Jaysh al-Izza after the unilateral release of several Syrian Army prisoners of war by the Turkish government in the context of the Second Northern Syria Buffer Zone.

=== Fighting outside Syria ===
According to Turkish sources and an activist in Afrin, the Sultan Murad Division was one of the groups which volunteered to send fighters to Libya as part of a Turkish operation to aid the Tripoli-based Government of National Accord in December 2019. There were further reports of Sultan Murad fighters in Libya in early and mid 2020. The Syrian Observatory on Human Rights says these fighters include minors. One Sultan Murad squad leader, Murad Abu Hamoud Al-Azizi, was reported by Egypt Today as killed in Tripoli in fighting that month.

Sultan Murad Division fighters have also been reported to have been deployed by Turkey in Azerbaijan in 2020.

In 2024, 550 fighters from the Sultan Murad Division were reportedly deployed to Niger to participate in the anti-ISIS campaign on behalf of the Nigerien government.

== War crimes ==
=== Alleged torture of POWs ===
After Turkish-backed rebels captured the town of Jarabulus from ISIL in September 2016, Kurdish media reported YPG allegations that Sultan Murad Division fighters were pictured next to four captured YPG fighters and that two Sultan Murad fighters from Hama were captured in retaliation by the SDF-led Jarabulus Military Council and questioned by Kurdish Anti-Terror Units, confessing to torturing the YPG prisoners. The Sultan Murad prisoners reportedly said the YPG prisoners were handed by the Division to Turkey.

=== Shelling of civilian areas ===
On 25 October 2013, the Sultan Murad Division shelled a monastery in Aleppo.

According to an Amnesty International report from May 2016, indiscriminate shelling of Sheikh Maqsoud during the Battle of Aleppo by the Fatah Halab joint operations room, which included the Sultan Murad Division, killed between February and April 2016 at least 83 civilians, including 30 children, and injured more than 700 civilians. Amnesty International's regional director suggested that these repeated indiscriminate attacks constitute war crimes.

A February 2017 report by the United Nations Independent International Commission of Inquiry on the Syrian Arab Republic came to the conclusion that, during the 2016 siege of Eastern Aleppo, Fatah Halab vowed to take revenge on the Kurds in Sheikh Maqsoud and then intentionally attacked civilian inhabited neighbourhoods of the Kurdish enclave, killing and maiming dozens of civilians, and that these acts constitute the war crime of directing attacks against a civilian population..

=== Pillage ===
In September 2020, the United Nations Office for the High Commissioner for Human Rights (OHCHR) and the Independent International Commission of Inquiry on the Syrian Arab Republic reported on human rights abuses by Syrian National Army fighters in NW Syria. Among these were "Division 24 (the Sultan Murad Brigade), repeatedly perpetrated the war crime of pillage in both the Afrin and Ra’s al-Ayn regions [of Aleppo and Hasakah Governorates]... and may also be responsible for the war crime of destroying or seizing the property of an adversary." In one case, a civilian from Tel al-Arisha village displaced by fighting had to buy back his own looted possessions from a Sultan Murad officer. The commission received reports of forced marriage and abduction of Kurdish women involving members of the Division.

=== Child soldiers ===
In a 2021 Trafficking in Persons (TIP) report by the United States Department of State Turkey was implicated in using child soldiers by providing support to Sultan Murad Division which have been found to be recruiting minors in Syria, and also sending them to Libya to fight.

=== Kidnap and torture of civilians ===
Afrin Post reported that the group kidnapped a civilian, named Khalil Manla, after he filed a complaint against them and detained him to their headquarters. They beat and tortured him before released him on a ransom of 1,000 Turkish liras.

== See also ==
- List of armed groups in the Syrian Civil War
- Syrian Democratic Turkmen Movement
