= Al-Rai, Syria =

Al-Rai الراعي
- Town
- Location of Al-Rai in Syria
- Coordinates: 36°36′43″N 37°26′48″E
- Country: Syria
- Governorate: Aleppo
- District: al-Bab
- Subdistrict: al-Rai

Population (2004)
  - Total: 4,609
- Time zone: UTC+2 (EET)
  - Summer (DST): UTC+3 (EEST)
- Geocode: C1250

Al-Rai (Arabic: الراعي, al-Ra'i or al-Rayi; Turkish: Çobanbey), is a small town in northern Aleppo Governorate, northern Syria. With 4,609 inhabitants, as per the 2004 census, al-Rai is the administrative center of the sparsely populated Nahiya al-Rai. Located on the Baghdad Railway and close to the Turkish border, right across Elbeyli, it is however a strategically important town. The town of Akhtarin is some 15 kilometers (9.3 mi) to the southwest. Larger towns are Azaz, some 35 kilometers (22 mi) to the west, and Jarablus and Manbij, both some 45 kilometers (28 mi) to the east.

Before the Syrian Civil War, the town was inhabited primarily by Turkmen. These Turkmens belong to the Elbegli tribe.

== Railway ==
The Al-Rai Railway Border Gate which had been closed since 1981, was reopened on 22 December 2009 after the 62 km line between Aleppo and Al-Rai was renewed. The opening ceremony was attended by the transport ministers of Turkey and Syria, Binali Yıldırım and Yaarub Bader.

== Education ==
=== Education under Turkish occupation (2016–present) ===
On 3 February 2021, a shoemaking and tailoring workshop for prisoners was established in collaboration between Turkish-Dutch NGO Sumud and Turkey's Ministry of Youth and Sports.

On 6 February 2021, Official Gazette of Turkey announced Turkey's plan to open a new health care vocational school and a medical faculty in Al-Rai. Syrian Foreign Ministry expressed their objection through Syria's official news agency SANA, and named the decision "a dangerous act and a flagrant violation of international law".

== Syrian Civil War ==
In the Syrian Civil War, al-Rai was captured by Free Syrian Army (FSA) forces in July 2012 and held until early February 2014, when the FSA-allies the Al-Tawhid Brigade and Conquest Brigade were assaulted by a predominantly Chechen unit of the Islamic State, (IS) which seized the town on 3 February 2014.

Since then, the Islamic State considered the town its main stronghold in the Aleppo countryside. In the course of their Northern Aleppo offensive, FSA units captured the town twice in April 2016 and in June 2016, but both times were not able to withstand counterattacks by the Islamic State. The FSA, supported by Turkey, recaptured the town a third time in the August 2016 Battle of al-Rai, but lost it yet another time to an Islamic State counterattack later in August. On 3 September 2016, rebels were reported to have recaptured the town for the fourth time with the help of Turkish forces (including tanks) and to have seized several villages close by.

Syrian Turkmen Brigades' political wing Syrian Turkmen Assembly announced the relocation of its headquarters into Al-Rai on 31 December 2019, which was previously located in Istanbul, Turkey.

== Gallery ==
al-Rai is the administrative center of Nahiya al-Rai of the Al-Bab District

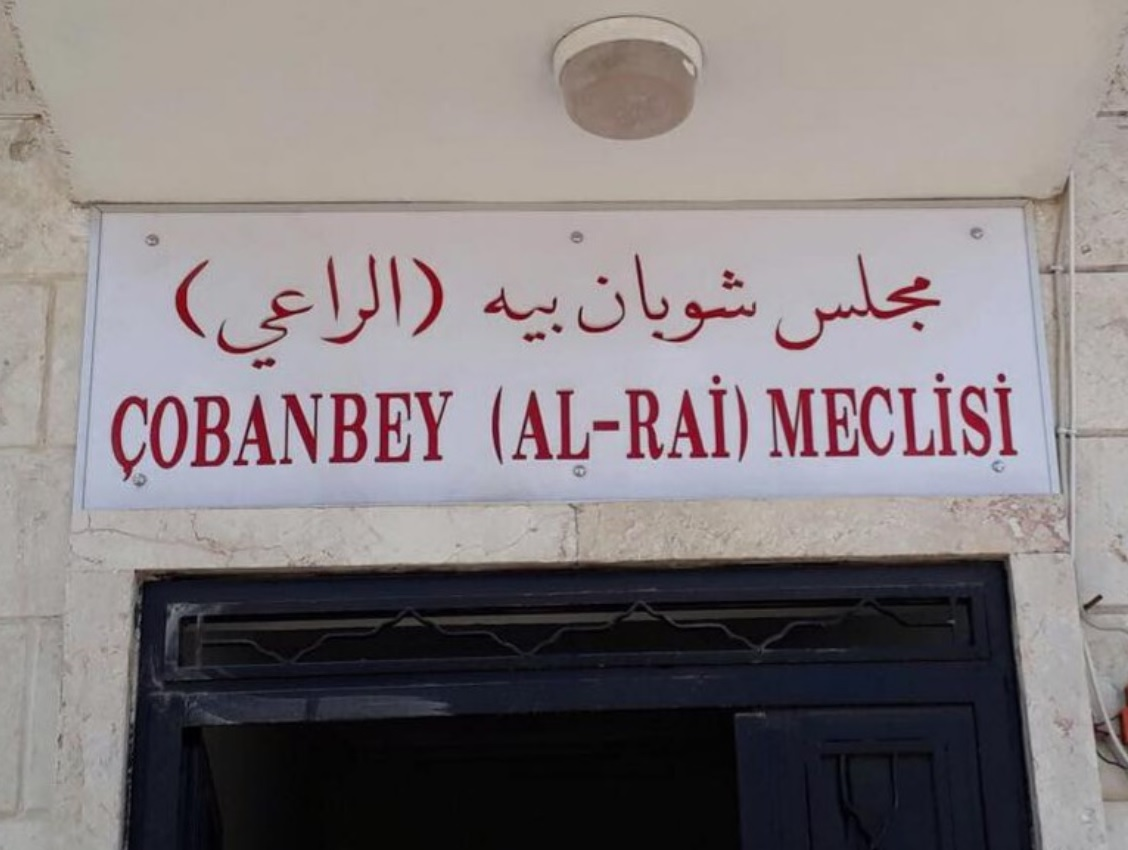
Al-Rai Council of Syrian Turkmen Assembly

== See also ==
- Talal Silo, Syrian Democratic Forces commander originating from Al-Rai
