= Descendants of Saladin Brigade =

Free Syrian Army Unit

- لواء أحفاد صلاح الدين; Liwa Ahfad Saladin
- A variant of the Syrian opposition flag used by Liwa Ahfad Saladin, in addition to the flag of Kurdistan and the regular independence flag
- Leaders: Mahmoud Khallo (nom de guerre "Abu Hamza") (until July 2017); Masoud Ibo ("Abu al-Majd Komale") (spokesman); Mohammed Hawash (until March 2016; since July 2017)
- Dates active: 2015–July 2017 (main group); July 2017–Unknown (pro-Turkey faction)
- Headquarters: Azaz and Mare'
- Active regions: Aleppo Governorate
- Ideology: Democracy; Kurdish nationalism (faction)
- Size: 600 (2016)
- Part of: (Syrian opposition) Free Syrian Army: 99th Division (2016)
- Wars: the Syrian Civil War

The Descendants of Saladin Brigade (Arabic: لواء أحفاد صلاح الدين; Liwa Ahfad Saladin) was a Free Syrian Army group active in the northern Aleppo Governorate. The group was supported by Turkey and was initially funded and armed by the United States, mainly fighting the Islamic State of Iraq and the Levant but also opposing the Syrian government and the Democratic Union Party's (PYD) affiliates such as the Syrian Democratic Forces (SDF). The brigade was largely disbanded by the Turkish Army in 2017, following disagreements over the participation in a planned Turkish-led offensive against Afrin Canton, although a small faction within the group (known simply as Saladin Brigade) remained active and participated in the offensive since January 2018.

== Ideology ==
Named after the Kurdish founder of the Ayyubid dynasty, Saladin, the group is non-sectarian and officially advocates equal rights for all ethnicities in Syria, although it stated that it is not secular. According to the militia's former leader, Mahmoud Khallo, "Kurds, Arabs, Turkmen, Christians, Armenians and Alawites" are "all brothers under the roof of a single homeland". Though not categorically opposed to the federalization of Syria, the Descendants of Saladin Brigade believed that "federalism is not an effective system for Syria" due to most areas of the country being ethnically diverse. The Descendants of Saladin Brigade generally advocates civil democracy, though opposes the PYD on principle and rejected any talks with the party which it considers a proxy of the Syrian government.

In an interview in December 2016, Khallo stated that his group's goal was to achieve equal rights for Kurds in Syria and to make Kurdish an official language in Syria. He stated that the group had good relations with Turkey and the Kurdistan Democratic Party of Iraqi Kurdistan, and that their role model and leader was Massoud Barzani, head of the KDP and president of Iraqi Kurdistan at the time. Khallo opposed the American-led intervention in the Syrian Civil War due to the US-led Coalition's support for the SDF.

Despite its strong opposition to the PYD, however, the unit was opposed to attacking the PYD-controlled Afrin Canton. The group's leader, Mahmoud Khallo, claimed that other Turkish-backed rebel groups have "hatred towards the Kurds", and feared potential massacres of Kurds if they launched an offensive against Afrin. After the Descendants of Saladin Brigade was mostly disbanded due to this stance, the remnant group that remained active and allied to Turkey continued to state that the "FSA includes different ethnicities, and they all want a united and free Syria", though supported the invasion of Afrin on grounds that the PYD's People's Protection Units (YPG) are "terrorist" in nature, "killed Kurds and left them homeless", and "bred tyrannical regimes".

== Organization and support ==
By 2016, the Descendants of Saladin Brigade claimed to have 600 members, primarily Kurdish, with one third of its fighters being Arabs and Syrian Turkmen, in addition to one Christian and one Alawite fighter. They along with the Dhi Qar Brigade were part of Division 99 in 2016. For most of its existence, the entire militia was led by Mahmoud Khallo (nom de guerre "Abu Hamza") who was one of its founders and a long-time opponent of the PYD. After his removal from command in 2017, leadership of the remaining Saladin Brigade passed to Mohammed Hawash, a member of a Kurdish tribe from the Idlib countryside. Masoud Ibo, former spokesman of the Descendants of Saladin Brigade, also joined Hawash's group. In November 2017, Ibo condemned Ibrahim Biro, head of the Kurdish National Council. Ibo stated in February 2018 that the group will try to avoid civilian casualties during the Turkish military operation in Afrin.

It is unknown how many fighters of the group have remained active following the disbandment of 2017. Hawash stated in early 2018 that his unit would try to recruit Kurds from the areas captured by pro-Turkish forces in the Afrin area.

Members of the Descendants of Saladin Brigade were described as "gangs" by the pro-SDF newspapers such as Hawar News Agency. ARA News reported in April 2017 that the group had "minimal support" among Kurds in Syria and only had a "small number of fighters".

== History ==
The group's commander, Mahmoud Khallo, was previously a commander in the Yusuf al-'Azma Brigade, based around Qabasin and the countryside of al-Bab. At one time, Khallo was also imprisoned by the YPG for 19 months.

In response to the formation of the Syrian Democratic Forces in October 2015, and its expansion into Afrin Canton in November 2015, Khallo called the SDF "agents of the Syrian regime". Masoud Ibo, spokesman of the group, also called the PYD "an integral part of Bashar al-Assad’s Ba'athist regime".

Following the northern Aleppo offensive in February 2016, which involved the SDF, the Descendants of Saladin Brigade called the SDF a "Satanic alliance" and vowed to fight it "until the last drop of blood".

Since February 2016, the group suffered a series of internal splits. On 27 February, a number of its fighters defected from the group, accusing it of corruption, "betraying the blood of martyrs", "serving personal interests", "unmatched selfishness", and "forgetting the goals of the real revolution". They also accused leaders of the group of being affiliated with Kurdish parties "unpatriotic toward the Syrian Revolution", marginalizing "free Kurdish fighters" and replacing them with "paid mercenaries", and "political coordination" with the SDF's Army of Revolutionaries. In March, Mohammed Hawash, the group's military commander, defected after he accused the group of collaborating with the Kurdish National Council. Hawash called the 99th Division, which the Descendants of Saladin Brigade joined, a "dirty formation".

In March 2016 Ahrar ash-Sham ordered the group to take down the flag of Kurdistan from its headquarters and threatened military force. However, the group's commander, Mahmoud Khallo, denied the incident ever occurred and claimed Ahrar ash-Sham to be its ally. At the time, the Descendants of Saladin Brigade was part of the United States-led Syrian Train and Equip Program, though the group said that the support it received from the United States fell short of what was actually needed.

The Descendants of Saladin Brigade participated in the offensive to capture the city of al-Bab and the town of Qabasin as part of Operation Euphrates Shield in late 2016 and early 2017. As part of its participation, the group requested Turkey to allow the flag of Kurdistan to be raised in Qabasin. On 3 April 2017, Ahrar al-Sham reportedly attacked the group in Qabasin and captured more than 8 of their fighters, including a commander. Hours later, the prisoners were released after negotiations, although tensions between the two groups remain.

On 15 May 2017, the commander of the group, Mahmoud Khallo, was arrested by Turkey. This "soured" the group's relations with Turkey.

On 3 July 2017, Mahmoud Khallo declared that his unit would not participate in a planned Turkish-led offensive against the SDF in the Afrin Canton and the Shahba region. Following the announcement, the group was attacked by multiple Turkish-backed groups, which captured the group's positions and warehouses with vehicles, weapons, and equipment. On 5 July, a Facebook page which claimed to represent the group disavowed Khallo and vowed to continue to fight against the SDF alongside other Turkish-backed rebel groups. On 14 July, Khallo himself was captured by the Levant Front, which accused him of affiliation with both al-Qaeda and the Democratic Union Party (PYD), and was tortured. The Levant Front then handed him over to Turkish security forces, who interrogated him. After being released soon after, Khallo protested against his unit's treatment and criticized that Turkey was apparently only interested in using the Syrian militias to further its own strategic goals. He also said that his unit, now without weapons, would set up a political party.

A remnant of the militia continued to be active and cooperate with Turkey, however, though now known simply as "Saladin Brigade" and led by Mohammed Hawash. This faction participated in the Turkish-led offensive against the SDF in the Afrin Region, stating that "the operation in Afrin paves the way for the liberation of the remaining Syrian lands from any form of terrorism".

== See also ==
- List of armed groups in the Syrian Civil War
- Saladin Ayubi Brigade
- Azadî Battalion
- List of military units named after people
