= Mare' =

Mare' مارع
- Town
- Location of Mare' in Syria
- Coordinates: 36°28′58″N 37°11′47″E
- Country: Syria
- Governorate: Aleppo
- District: Azaz
- Subdistrict: Mare'
- Elevation: 420 m (1,380 ft)

Population (2004)
  - Total: 16,904
- Time zone: UTC+2 (EET)
  - Summer (DST): UTC+3 (EEST)
- Geocode: C1643

Mare' (Arabic: مارع, romanized: Māriʿ, locally pronounced Mēreʿ), also spelled Marea, is a town in northern Aleppo Governorate, northwestern Syria. It is the largest town and administrative centre of the Mare' nahiyah in the Azaz District. Located some 25 kilometers north of the city of Aleppo, the town has a population of 16,904 as per the 2004 census. Nearby localities include Shaykh Issa and Tell Rifaat to the west, A'zaz to the northwest, Dabiq to the northeast, al-Bab to the southeast, and Maarat Umm Hawsh and Herbel to the south.

Mare' is the administrative center of Nahiya Mare' of the Azaz District.

== Syrian Civil War ==
Mare' was affected by the ongoing Syrian uprising against the government of Bashar al-Assad. The Ibn Walid brigade of the opposition Free Syrian Army was formed in the town in August 2012. The Mare' Operations Room was, as well, based around the town.

In January 2015, Mare' was controlled by the Islamic Front. However, the capture of the nearby town of Dabiq in early 2015 by the Islamic State threatened the town of Mare'. One of the largest rebel-controlled towns close to the front-line of Islamic State territory, Mare' produced a salient that ISIS attempted to reduce in a number of minor offensives against the town which continued until May 2016.

During the Northern Aleppo offensive in February 2016, Russian airstrikes preceded an assault by Kurdish YPG militias, forcing the overwhelming majority of the population to escape towards other rebel-controlled territories or across the border into Turkey. The Turkish government declared Mare' to be part of a red line which Kurdish forces must not cross. The YPG advance put Mare' on the frontlines with SDF forces to the west, Syrian Army forces to the south, and Islamic State forces to the east. In August 2016, Mare' was reportedly controlled by the FSA. Following Turkey's launch of Operation Euphrates Shield, the 2016 Dabiq offensive in September 2016 pushed the ISIS front-line back, removing the imminent threat posed to the town.
