= Kafr Naseh =

Kafr Naseh كفر ناصح
- Village
- Location of Kafr Naseh in Syria
- Coordinates: 36°25′40″N 37°06′50″E
- Country: Syria
- Governorate: Aleppo
- District: Azaz
- Subdistrict: Tell Rifaat

Population (2004)
  - Total: 1,433
- Time zone: UTC+2 (EET)
  - Summer (DST): UTC+3 (EEST)
- Geocode: C1628

Kafr Naseh (Arabic: كفر ناصح) is a town in northern Aleppo Governorate, northwestern Syria. Administratively part of Nahiya Tell Rifaat in A'zaz District, the village has a population of 1,433 as per the 2004 census. Nearby localities include Tell Rifaat to the north, Kafr Naya to the west, Maskan and Ahras to the south, and Herbel to the east.
