= Shahba Canton =

Unit of the Autonomous Administration of North and East Syria

Coordinates: 36.5280°N 37.9540°E

Shahba Canton Kantona Şehba مقاطعة الشهباء
- One of the two cantons of the Afrin Region
- 2016–2024
- Coat of arms

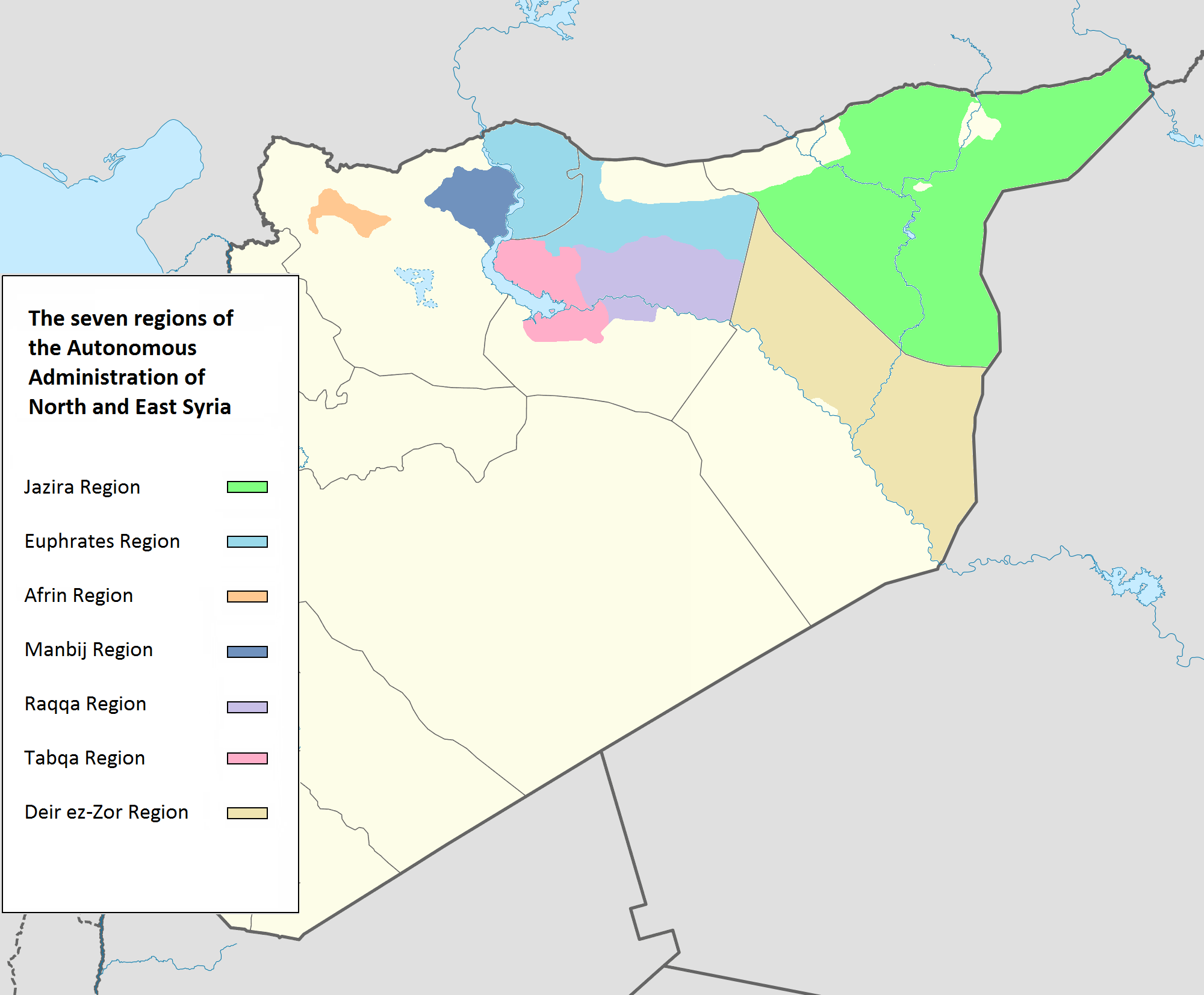
- The Shahba Canton was located in a strip north of Aleppo between the Turkish-backed Syrian Interim Government and Ba'athist Syria.
- Capital: Tel Rifaat (until 2024)
- Government
- Co-president of the Council of Shahba
  - 2016–2024: Ismail Musa
- Historical era: Syrian Civil War
  - Established: 2016
  - Council of Shahba created: March 22, 2016
  - Captured during Operation Dawn of Freedom: December 1, 2024
  - Disestablished: 2024
Preceded by	Succeeded by
Afrin Region	Syrian Interim Government
- Today part of: Turkish occupation of northern Syria
- The Shahba Canton was part of the Afrin region, alongside the Afrin Canton. After Turkey and its allies occupied Afrin, the SDF controlled only the Shahba Canton.

The Shahba Canton (Kurdish: Kantona Şehba, Arabic: مقاطعة الشهباء, Classical Syriac: ܦܠܩܐ ܕܫܗܒܐ, romanized: Pelqo d'Shahba) was a political unit of the Autonomous Administration of North and East Syria, in the Aleppo Governorate. The canton was established to administer the areas captured by the Syrian Democratic Forces from the Islamic State of Iraq and the Levant west of the Euphrates, as part of the Afrin Region.

The Shahba autonomous region was founded during the first and second conferences of the Shahba region in Afrin on 28 January 2016 and 2–4 February 2016. The conferences set up the Shahba Regional Assembly with its own council and senate and a de facto autonomous administration, created on 22 March 2016. During the 2024 Syrian opposition offensives, the remaining SDF-controlled area around Tell Rifaat was also taken by the Turkish-backed Syrian National Army.

== Geography ==
Shahba is a nickname for the city of Aleppo. The Shahba Canton originally denoted the parts of northern Aleppo Governorate of Syria that are under the administrative control of the Autonomous Administration of North and East Syria as part of the Afrin Region. Accordingly, the canton initially included Manbij, but by 2019, Shahba Canton had been restructured and only included the area around Tel Rifaat and Menagh.

== Demographics ==
The population of Shahba Canton mainly consists of Arab Syrians, with an additional considerable Syrian Turkmen and Kurdish population; among the latter are many people displaced by the Syrian civil war. Fabrice Balanche claims that toponymy and maps published by the French colonial authorities indicate that a significant percentage of inhabitants of Shahba who are officially classified as Arabs have Kurdish origins. From early 2018, thousands of Kurds fled from Afrin and resettled in Shahba Canton.

As of March 2016, Society for Threatened Peoples estimated that there were 450 inhabited villages in the Shahba plain to the north and the east of Aleppo around Azaz, Al-Bab, Manbij and As-Safira, claiming 217 of these settlements to be Kurdish. However, in Fabrice Balanche's article from the same year, it was claimed that the Kurdish population in the Afrin canton at the time (which included the "nearly 100 percent Kurdish" western Afrin district) was going to be diluted to 30 percent with the possible incorporation of the Shahba plain. Likewise, Center for Middle Eastern Strategic Studies disagreed with the estimates of the Society for Threatened Peoples, claiming that it inflated the local number of Kurds. The ethnic makeup of the area was also affected by the Syrian civil war; for instance, in several cases Arab families in the Shahba plain fled the advance of the YPG/YPJ, whereas Kurds fled from Turkish and allied forces.

Tell Rifaat is the largest town in the canton. According to the 2004 Syrian census, Tell Rifaat had 20,514 inhabitants. Following the Turkish Operation Olive Branch, many Kurds, Arabs, and Yazidis fled to the Shahba Canton, forming five refugee camps near Tell Rifaat. In 2020, the Rojava Information Center claimed that Tell Rifaat housed 200,000 internally displaced persons; a local in Shahba Canton estimated in late 2021 that the number was closer to 100,000.

== History ==
=== During the Syrian Civil War and Rojava conflict ===
The frontlines in the Shahba region, as of April 2017.

In the second half of 2012, most of the region was captured from the Syrian government by opposition groups, including the People's Protection Units (YPG) and its ally the Kurdish Front. In January 2014 the Islamic State of Iraq and the Levant (ISIL), who had been infiltrating the region over the course of the previous year, launched a massive assault, and eventually captured almost the entire region, including Manbij, Jarabulus and Al-Bab, up to Dabiq.

On the western side, some territory in the Azaz district stayed under the control of non-ISIL forces, villages and towns occasionally contested and changing hands between Afrin District based YPG and allies (all since October 2015 under the umbrella of the Syrian Democratic Forces, SDF) and diverse rebel militias, until finally a February 2016 offensive by SDF forces, inter alia capturing Tel Rifaat and Menagh Airbase, created today's borderline between them.

To the east, near the city of Manbij, in December 2015 the Syrian Democratic Forces (SDF) launched an offensive from the east across the Euphrates river and captured the strategic Tishrin Dam and surrounding villages, forming a small salient on the western bank of the river. In the following months an offensive to capture Manbij city from ISIS was planned, but was delayed because of opposition and demands from the Turkish government. In May 2016 the SDF launched an offensive towards Manbij city along 3 axes: from the north and south along the banks of the Euphrates river, and on the southern outskirts of Manbij city aiming to block the Raqqa-Manbij road. From 30 May to 12 June 2016, the Manbij offensive resulted in the capture of more than 100 villages from ISIL. On 14 August 2016, after securing Manbij, the SDF established the Al-Bab Military Council with the goal of securing the city of al-Bab and its surrounding countryside. On 19 August 2016, the SDF component Manbij Military Council announced that it took over the security of Manbij city center and surrounding villages.

From late August 2016, Turkey assembled some Syrian rebel groups who with Turkish military support captured a strip of territory along the Turkish border from ISIL including the town of Jarabulus. This included some combat with Jarabulus Military Council SDF forces, which eventually settled for an armistice line along the Sajur River. To the south, SDF forces started offensives against ISIL west of Al-Bab in September 2016 and again in October 2016, capturing several villages in the process.

On 13 April 2017, negotiations between Turkey-backed rebel groups and the SDF reportedly restarted under the mediation of the United States. The parties discussed control over the villages and towns of Tell Rifaat, Menagh, Maryamin, Sheikh Issa, Maraanaz, Herbel, Deir Jamal, and several other villages situated in the western part of the Shahba Canton. The US-supported al-Mu'tasim Brigade reportedly represented the Turkey-backed rebel factions in the negotiations.

After Operation Olive Branch in early 2018 resulted in the occupation of nearby Afrin by the Turkish-led Syrian National Army, thousands of Kurds, Arabs, and Yazidis fled to Tel Rifaat and resettled in Shahba Canton. Since then, Shahba Canton remained under control of the SDF, mostly Kurdish-majority YPG/YPJ units. Though Turkey repeatedly threatened to occupy the area as well, Shahba Canton was maintained through protection by the Russian military and Syrian Army. Turkey has claimed that anti-Turkish guerrillas are operating from Tell Rifaat. Over time, the SDF reduced its public presence in Shahba Canton. In 2019, SDF commander Mazloum Abdi claimed that the SDF was no longer present in the area, although locals argued that Tell Rifaat's SDF garrison was simply operating under the Syrian flag and dressed in Syrian Army uniforms. Tensions remained between the Syrian government and local authorities, however, with the 4th Division reportedly blockading Tell Rifaat.

During the 2024 Syrian opposition offensives, the remaining SDF-controlled area around Tell Rifaat was also taken by the Turkish-backed Syrian National Army.

== Politics and administration ==
Since its foundation the Shahba Canton has a Shahba Regional Assembly with its own council and senate.

Shahba Regional Assembly has a direct representative inside the Democratic Syria Assembly (MSD) and Cîhan Xedro is also formally elected to represent the Al-Shahba Canton inside the MSD.

Shahba Canton is governed following the Constitution of Rojava. It is noted for its explicit affirmation of minority rights, gender equality and a form of direct democracy known as democratic confederalism.

Article 8 of the 2014 of the NES constitution stipulates that "all Cantons in the Autonomous Regions are founded upon the principle of local self-government. They may freely elect their representatives and representative bodies, and may pursue their rights insofar as it does not contravene the articles of the Charter."

The governing party of Shahba Canton is the Syrian National Democratic Alliance (Arabic: التحالف الوطني الديمقراطي السوري, TWDS). It is a left-wing multi-ethnic political party established in 2014 in northern Syria.

On 12 March 2017, the Legislative Assembly of Manbij approved the elected co-presidents who then took office. During the meeting the departments of the committee members, co-presidents and committees were determined after speeches and evaluations. 13 committees where determined. The 13 new committees include 71 Arabs, 43 Kurds, 10 Turkmen, 8 Circassians, and an Armenian and a Chechen.

On 2 April 2017, the Shahba Council held a meeting with residents of Nayrabiyah village of the Al-Bab Subdistrict & announced the creation of the Nayrabiyah Council.

=== Executive officers ===
The prime ministers were elected and the remaining Executive Council appointed as follows:

Name	Party	Office	Elected	Notes
Ismail Musa	TWDS	Acting Prime Minister	2016	
Ayman al-Hafez	TWDS	Acting Deputy Prime Minister	2016	
Mohammed Ahmed Khaddro	TWDS	Acting Deputy Prime Minister	2016	
?		Minister of Foreign Affairs	2016	
?		Minister of Internal Affairs	2016	
?		Minister of Finance	2016	
?		Minister of Education	2016	
?		Minister of Health	2016	
?		Minister of Martyrs’ Families	2016	
?		Minister of Youth and Sport	2016	
?		Minister of Religious Affairs and Reconciliation	2016	
?		Minister of Women and Family Affairs	2016	
?		Minister of Information and Communication	2016	

=== Police ===
Security in the Shahba Canton is primarily handled by the local Asayish police force. There have been reported to be many locals who have joined the police forces, the female component of which has drawn particular attention in international media.

On 22 February 2017, the Asayish handed over the security responsibility of Manbij to an internal security force formed in the city.

== Education ==
To the east, in Manbij, public schooling has regained secular normalcy after the ISIL episode.

== See also ==
- Federalization of Syria
- Rojava conflict
- Rojava
