= Al-Muslimiyah =

Al-Muslimiyah المسلمية
- Village
- Location within Syria
- Coordinates: 36°16′54.43″N 37°11′35.04″E
- Country: Syria
- Governorate: Aleppo
- District: Mount Simeon
- Nahiyah: Mount Simeon

Population (2004 census)
  - Total: 5,916
- Time zone: UTC+3 (AST)

Al-Muslimiyah (Arabic: المسلمية, also spelled Muslimiyeh, Moslemiye, Msalamiyyah or al-Musalmiya), commonly known as Mouslimié, is a village in northern Syria, administratively part of the Mount Simeon District of the Aleppo Governorate, located 16 kilometers (9.9 mi) north of Aleppo. Nearby localities include Tell Qarah and Fafin to the north, Ratyan to the northwest, Huraytan to the southwest, the Bustan al-Basha and Sheikh Maqsoud neighborhoods of Aleppo to the south and Kafr Saghir to the southeast. According to the Syria Central Bureau of Statistics (CBS), al-Muslimiyah had a population of 5,916 in the 2004 census.

== History ==
Sepulchres from the Bronze Age were found in al-Muslimiyah.

In 1103 the Crusaders led by Bohemond I of Antioch and Joscelin of Courtenay captured al-Muslimiyah and exacted a large tribute from its Muslim inhabitants. The sum was used to repay the Crusaders that lent money to Baldwin I of Jerusalem who paid the ransom for Bohemond's earlier release from Muslim imprisonment. In a truce with Bohemond, the Seljuk Muslim ruler of the region, Ridwan of Aleppo, agreed to pay 7,000 pieces of gold and ten horses to the Crusaders while Bohemond agreed to release all Muslim prisoners with the exception of officers captured at al-Muslimiyah.

=== Modern era ===
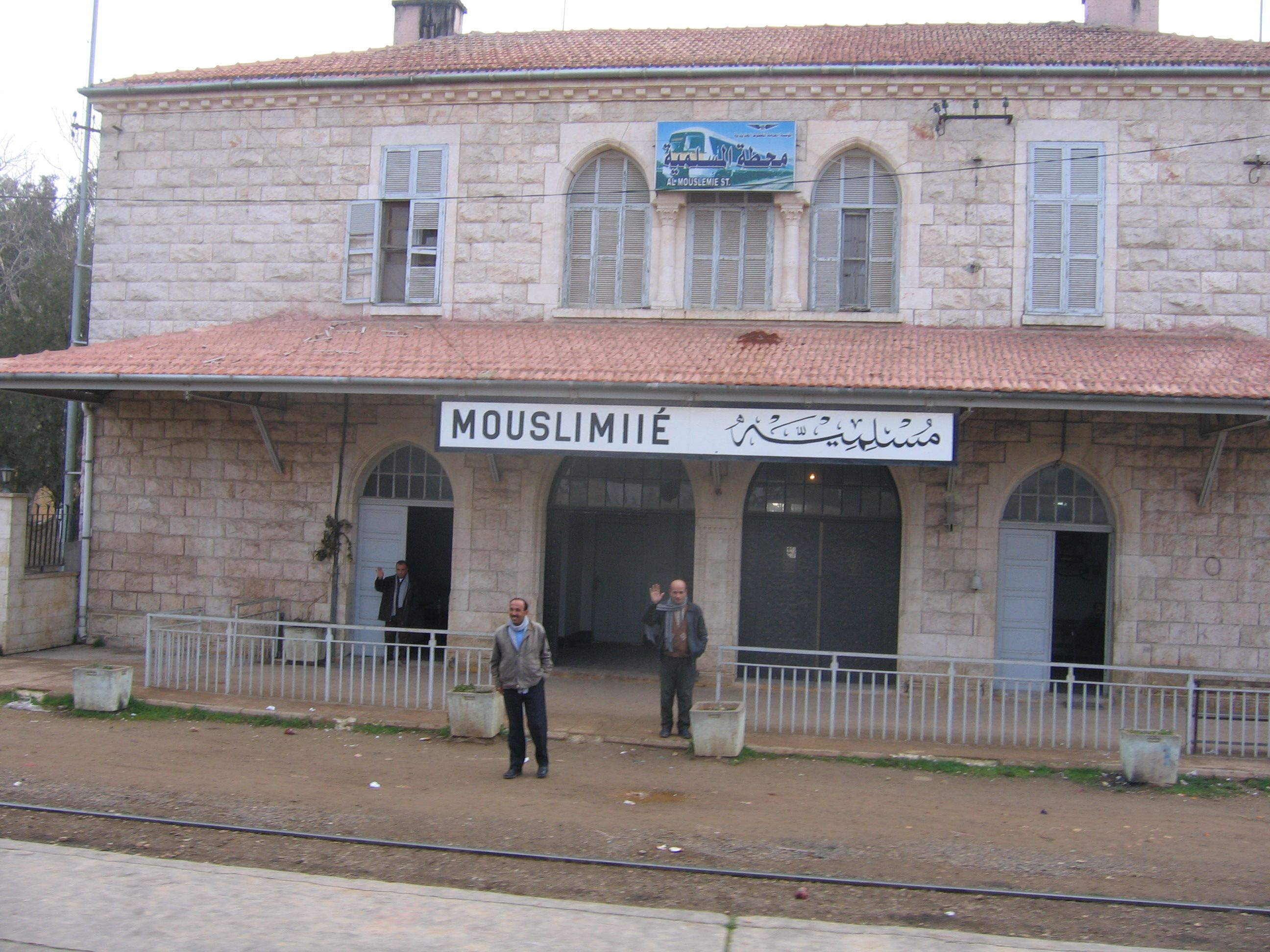
Al-Muslimiyah Railway Station

Al-Muslimiyah formed a junction of the Baghdad Railway connecting Aleppo with Mosul. The railway proceeds to Jarabulus following the al-Muslimiyah junction. On 29 October 1918, towards the end of World War I, the British and Sharifian Arab armies captured the railroad junction at al-Muslimiyah from the Ottomans, gaining control over the rail link to Mesopotamia.

On 13 November 1961 four female workers were wounded by the explosion of a mine in al-Muslimiyah. The Syrian Police and Public Security Directorate reported that the mine was one of 30 that was swept to the area from the border with Turkey as a result of flood waters. In 1980 construction of a cement plant in al-Muslimiyah was completed and began operations. Its production capacity was 1,000 tons of concrete per day.

On 15 December 2012, during the ongoing Syrian civil war which began in 2011, anti-government rebels from the Tawhid Brigade of the Free Syrian Army (FSA) reportedly captured the Hanano Barracks, a Syrian Army infantry academy, army base and recruiting center at al-Muslimiyah, after weeks of fighting. The Hanano Barracks has a three-kilometer square campus. During heavy clashes on 18 November 2013, a top rebel commander from the Tawhid Brigade, Abdul Qader Saleh ("Haji Mare'"), was killed during the clashes while the pro-opposition Syrian Observatory for Human Rights stated a large number of rebels and soldiers were also slain in the battle. The rebel brigade claimed it captured 100 prisoners.

== Bibliography ==
- Lipinsky, Edward (2006). On the Skirts of Canaan in the Iron Age: Historical and Topographical Researches. Peeters Publishers. ISBN 9042917989.
- Nicholson, Robert Warren (1978). Tancred: A Study of His Career and Work in Their Relation to the First Crusade and the Establishment of the Latin States in Syria and Palestine. AMS Press. ISBN 0404154255.
- Parfit, Joseph Thomas (1920). Marvellous Mesopotamia: the world's wonderland. S. W. Partridge & Co., Ltd. "Muslimiyeh."
- Runciman, Steven (1987). A History of the Crusades: The Kingdom of Jerusalem and the Frankish East, 1100-1187. CUP Archive. ISBN 0521347718.
- Stevenson, William Barron (1907). The Crusaders in the East: A Brief History of the Wars of Islam with the Latins in Syria during the Twelfth and Thirteenth Centuries. University Press. "Muslimiya Crusader."
