= Afrin Region =

De facto region in Syria (2014–2024)

- Region of the Autonomous Administration of North and East Syria
- 2014–2024
- Flag

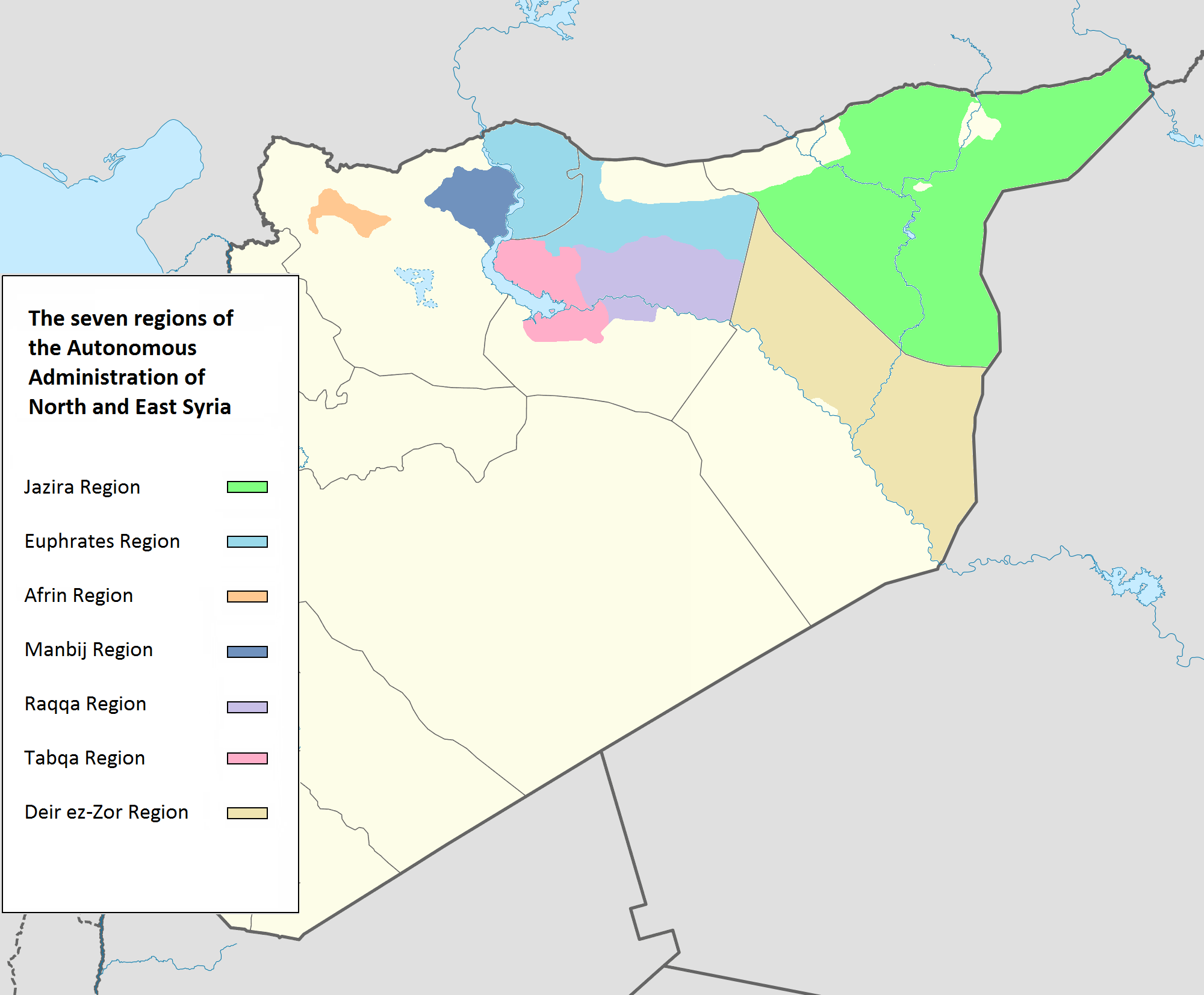
- The seven regions of the Autonomous Administration of North and East Syria in March 2024, the Afrin region in orange
- Capital: Afrin (until 2018); Tel Rifaat (seat-in-exile, until 2024)
- Population
  - 2018: 323,000
- Government
- Prime Minister
  - 2014–2024: Hevi Ibrahim
- Historical era: Syrian Civil War
  - Autonomy declared: 2014
  - Administration move to Tel Rifaat: 2018
  - Takeover by Syrian Interim Government: 2024
Preceded by	Succeeded by
Ba'athist Syria	Turkish occupation of northern Syria

Afrin Region (Kurdish: Herêma Efrînê; Arabic: إقليم عفرين; Classical Syriac: ܦܢܝܬܐ ܕܥܦܪܝܢ, romanized: Ponyotho d'Afrin) was the westernmost of the three original regions of the Autonomous Administration of North and East Syria.

The region previously had two subordinate cantons, the Afrin Canton, consisting of the Afrin city area (with the Şêrewa, Mobata, Şêra and Maydankah districts subordinate to it), the Jindires area (with the Şiyê district subordinate to it), Rajo area (with the Bulbul, Maydana and Bahdina districts subordinate to it), as well as the Shahba Canton consisting of the Tell Rifaat area (with the Ahraz, Fafin and Kafr Naya districts subordinate to it). The status of Manbij was unclear; while some reports described it as part of the Shabha Canton and Afrin Region, communal and regional elections were not held there, and official documents that clarified the new regional framework did not refer to Manbij.

Afrin Region was first declared autonomous under the name of Afrin Canton in January 2014. The subdivision of the Autonomous Administration of North and East Syria was renamed Afrin Region during subdivision congresses held in July and August 2017, while the name Afrin Canton was then given to one of its two subdivisions, as the canton or province became the name for second-level subdivisions in the Federation. Most of the region's territory (including Afrin Canton) was under the Turkish occupation of northern Syria from early 2018. The last elected prime minister of Afrin Region was Hevi Ibrahim. The administrative centre of the region was the city of Afrin until it was lost, after which the administration shifted to Tell Rifaat. During the 2024 Syrian opposition offensives, the remaining area around Tell Rifaat was also taken by the Turkish-backed Syrian National Army.

== Demographics ==
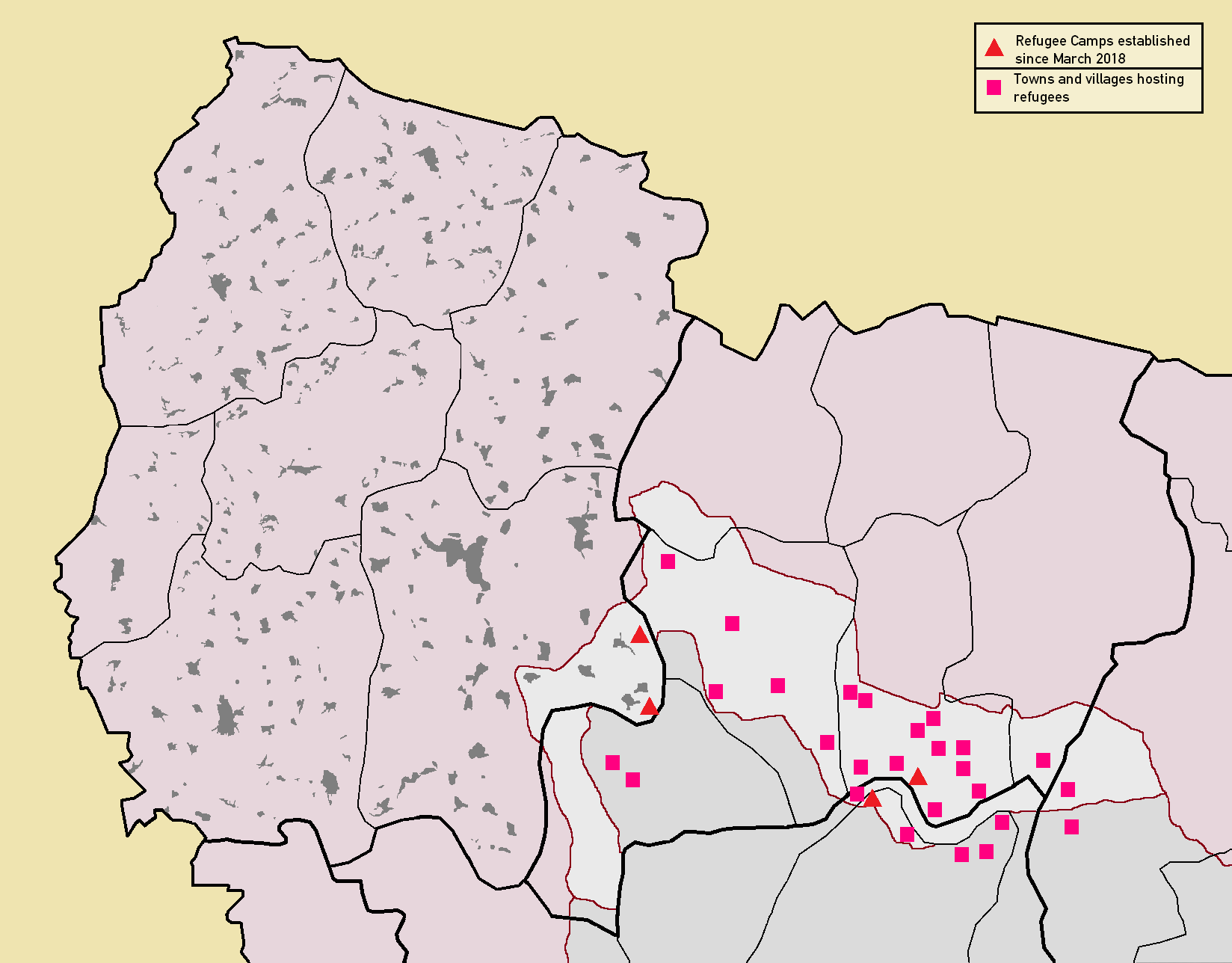
Map of the location of settlement of refugees displaced from Afrin due to the Turkish invasion in 2018

The western, mountainous part of the Afrin Region was overwhelmingly ethnic Kurdish, to the degree that the area was described as "homogeneously Kurdish". The central and eastern parts of the Afrin Region had a highly diverse ethnic population, consisting of Arab Syrians and Arabized Kurds found throughout the area, as well as considerable Circassian and Chechen populations in the city of Manbij and considerable Syrian Turkmen and Arabized Turkmen populations toward the north of the area. A smaller minority consisted of Armenians. Toponymy and maps published by the French colonial authorities indicated that a significant percentage of inhabitants of this area who were officially classified as Arabs actually had Kurdish origins.

Manbij and Tell Rifaat were the largest cities administered by de facto autonomous civil administrations operating under the umbrella of the Autonomous Administration of North and East Syria. According to the 2004 Syrian census, Manbij had 99,497 inhabitants, and Tell Rifaat had 20,514.

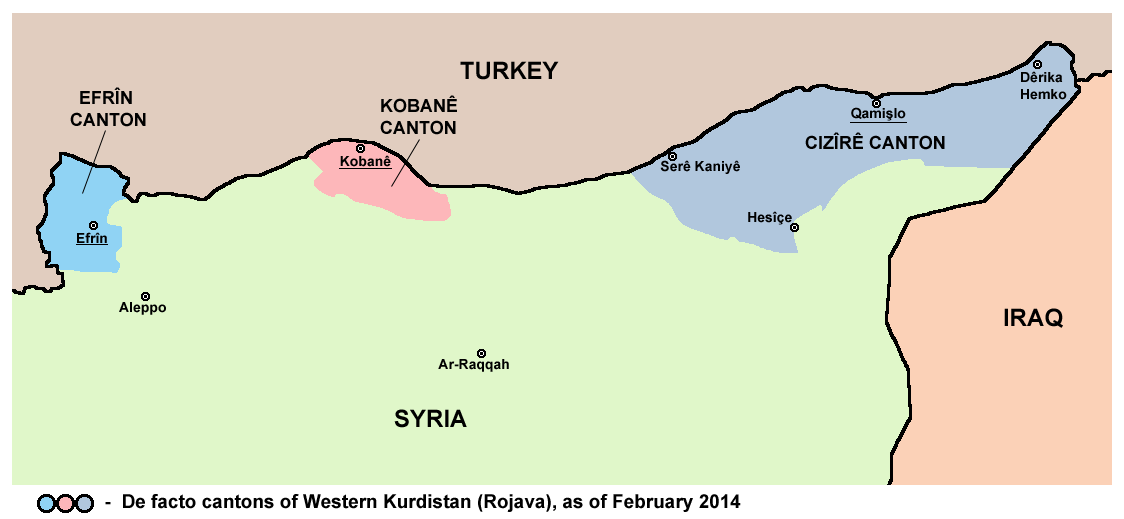
Map of Rojava cantons in February 2014

== History ==
The Afrin region area had seen human settlement since the early Neolithic.

According to René Dussaud, the region of Kurd-Dagh and the plain near Antioch had been settled by Kurds since antiquity. Stefan Sperl stated that there was reason to believe that Kurdish settlements in the Kurd Mountains went back to the Seleucid era, since those regions stood in the path to Antioch; Kurds in the early periods served as mercenaries and mounted archers. In any case, the Kurd Mountains were already Kurdish-inhabited when the Crusades broke out at the end of the 11th century.

In Classical Antiquity, the region was part of Chalybonitis (with its center at Chalybon or Aleppo), Chalcidice (with its center at Qinnasrīn العيس), and Cyrrhestica (with its center at Cyrrhus النبي حوري). This area was one of the most fertile and populated parts of the region. Under the Romans, the region was made part of the province of Coele Syria or Magna Syria in 193 CE, which was ruled from Antioch. The province of Euphratensis was established in the east in the 4th century CE, with its center at Hierapolis Bambyce (Manbij), which remained the main city of the region.

Under the Rashidun and Umayyad Muslim dynasties, the region was part of the Jund Qinnasrīn. In the Abbasid period, the region was under the independent rule of the Hamdanids. The Mamluks and later the Ottomans governed the area until 1918. During the Ottoman Empire (1299–1922), the region was part of the Vilayet of Aleppo. The largest of the Kurdish-speaking tribal groups in northern Syria was the Reshwan confederation, which was initially based in Adıyaman Province but eventually also settled throughout Anatolia. The Milli confederation, mentioned from 1518 onward, was the most powerful group and dominated the entire northern Syrian steppe in the second half of the 18th century. The Kurdish dynasty of Janbulad ruled the region of Aleppo as Ottoman governors from 1591 to 1607. At the beginning of the 17th century, the districts of Jarabulus and Seruj on the left bank of the Euphrates had been settled by Kurds.

During the French Mandate, the region was part of the brief State of Aleppo. In modern post-independence Syria, the Kurdish society of the region was subject to heavy-handed Arabization policies by the Damascus government.

In the course of the Syrian Civil War, Damascus government forces pulled back from the region in spring 2012, giving way to autonomous self-administration within the Rojava framework, which was formally declared on 29 January 2014. The territory of Afrin Region virtually never saw civil war combat. It was, however, at various times the target of artillery shelling by Islamist rebel groups as well as by Turkey. In response, Russian military troops reportedly stationed themselves in Afrin as part of an agreement to protect the YPG from further Turkish attacks.

=== Decline and fall ===
In early 2018, Afrin and the surrounding areas were occupied by Turkish-backed forces. Since then, the Turkish-backed forces were accused of human rights violations by the human rights commissioner to the United Nations, Michelle Bachelet.

During the 2024 Syrian opposition offensives, the remaining areas of the Afrin Region were captured by the Turkish-backed Syrian National Army.

== Politics and administration ==
According to the Constitution of Rojava, Afrin Region's Legislative Assembly declared autonomy during its session on 29 January 2014. The assembly elected Hêvî Îbrahîm Mustefa as prime minister, who appointed Remzi Şêxmus and Ebdil Hemid Mistefa as her deputies.

The remaining Executive Council was appointed as follows:

Name	Party	Office	Elected	Notes
Hêvî Îbrahîm Mustefa	PYD	Prime Minister	2014	
Remzi Şêxmus	PYD	Deputy Prime Minister	2014	
Ebdil Hemid Mistefa	PYD	Deputy Prime Minister	2014	
Silêman Ceefer	N/A	Foreign Minister	2014	
Ebdo Îbrahîm	PB-ASD	Defense Minister	2014	
Hesen Beyrem	N/A	Interior Minister	2014	
Nûrşan Hisên	PADKS	Regional Commissions, Councils and Planning Minister	2014	
Remezan Elî	N/A	Finance Minister	2014	
Erîfe Bekir	N/A	Labour and Social Security Minister	2014	
Riyaz Menle Mehemed	N/A	Education Minister	2014	
Eyûb Mihemed	N/A	Minister of Agriculture	2014	
Xelîl Şêx Hesen	N/A	Health Minister	2014	
Ehmed Yûsif	N/A	Economy and Trade Minister	2014	
Riyaz Ebdilhenan Şêxo	N/A	Minister of Martyrs' Families	2014	
Hêvîn Şêxo	N/A	Culture Minister	2014	
Welîd Selame	N/A	Transport Minister	2014	
Fazil Robcî	N/A	Youth and Sports Minister	2014	
Reşîd Ehmed	N/A	History and Tourism Minister	2014	
Mihemed Hemîd Qasim	N/A	Religious Affairs Minister	2014	
Fatme Lekto	N/A	Women and Family Minister	2014	
Xelîl Sîno	N/A	Human Rights Minister	2014	
Etûf Ebdo	N/A	Supervision Minister	2014	
Ebdil Rehman Selman	N/A	Information Minister	2014	
Seîd Esmet Xûbarî	N/A	Justice Minister	2014	
Kamîran Ehmed Şefîi Bilal	N/A	Energy Minister	2014	

== Economy ==
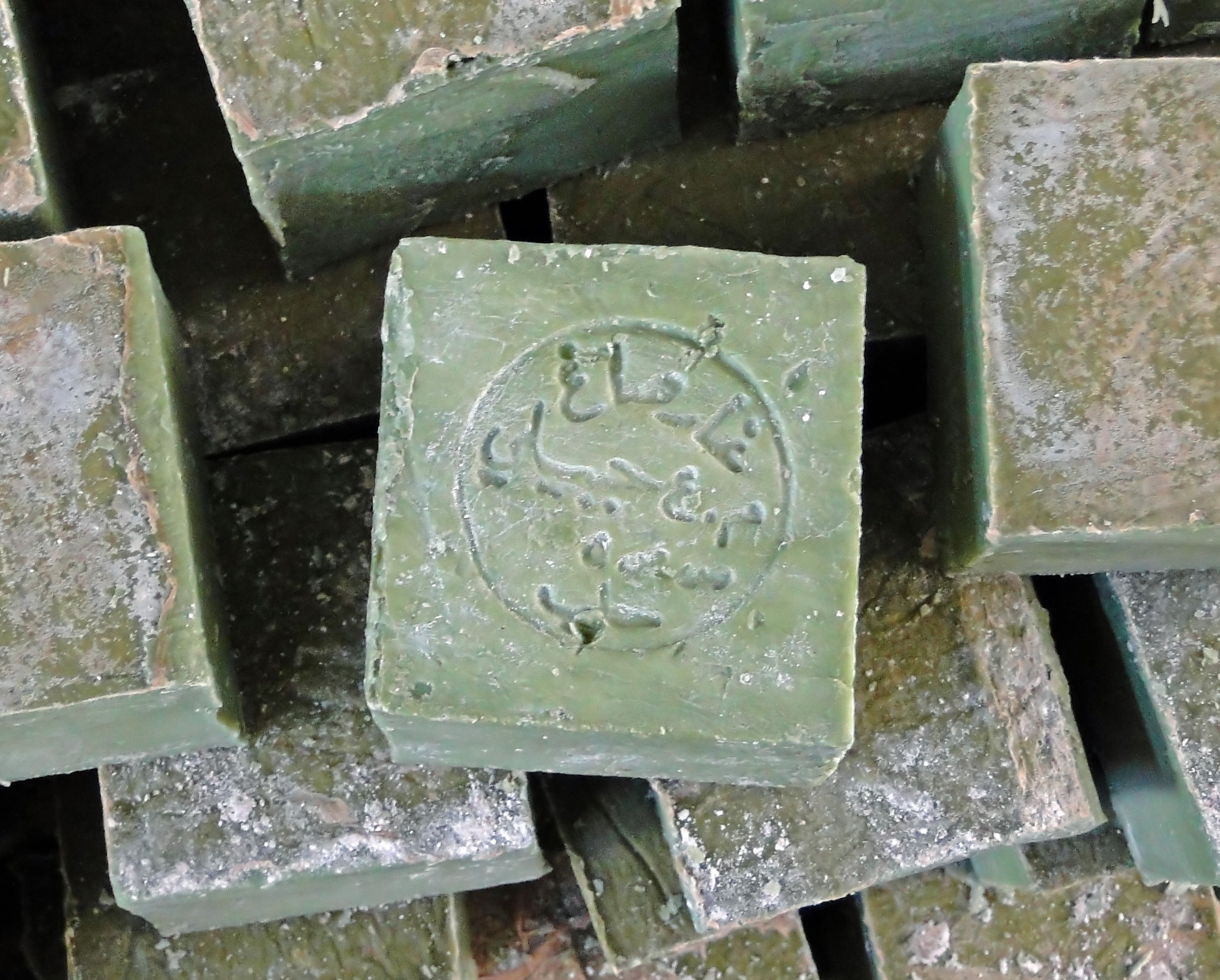
Aleppo soap

Afrin was well known for its olive groves. The areas governed by the SDC were under a blockade imposed by neighbouring Turkey, which placed high burdens on international imports and exports. For example, transportation of Aleppo soap to international markets, where possible, cost at least four times as much as it had before the war. In 2015, 32 tons of Aleppo soap were produced and exported to other parts of Syria, as well as to international markets.

== Education ==
Like in the other Rojava regions, primary education in the public schools was initially provided through mother-tongue instruction, either in Kurdish or Arabic, with the aim of achieving bilingualism in Kurdish and Arabic by secondary schooling. Curricula were a topic of continuous debate between the regions' Boards of Education and the Syrian central government in Damascus, which partly paid the teachers.

The federal, regional, and local administrations in Rojava placed much emphasis on promoting libraries and educational centers to facilitate learning and social and artistic activities.

Afrin Region had institutions of higher education. Most notably, it previously had the University of Afrin, which was founded in 2015. After teaching three programs (Electromechanical Engineering, Kurdish Literature, and Economy) in the first academic year, the university's second academic year had 22 professors and 250 students and offered three additional programs (Human Medicine, Journalism, and Agricultural Engineering).

== See also ==
- Federalization of Syria
- Rojava conflict
- Autonomous Administration of North and East Syria
- Jazira Region
- Euphrates Region
