= Hêvî Îbrahîm =

Syrian-Kurdish woman politician

Hevi Ibrahim
- Hêvî Îbrahîm
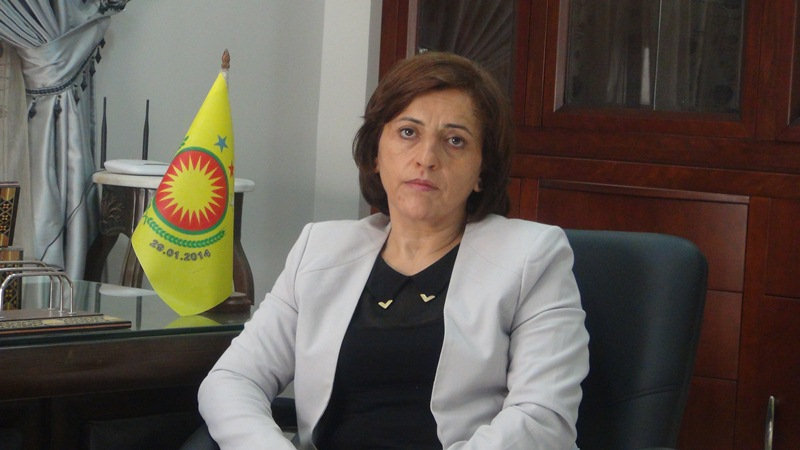

1st Prime Minister of the Afrin Region
- In office January 2014 – December 2024
- Deputy: Remzi Şêxmus; Ebdil Hemid Mustafa
- Preceded by: Office established

Personal details
- Born: 1967 (age 58–59) Mabeta, Aleppo, Syria
- Party: Democratic Union Party (PYD) (2014–present)
- Occupation: Teacher

Hêvî Îbrahîm Mustafa (Arabic: هيفي إبراهيم, Sorani Kurdish: هێڤی ئیبراهیم), is a Syrian Kurdish politician who serves as the Democratic Union Party (PYD) prime minister of the Afrin Region (originally Afrin Canton until August 2017), a de facto autonomous region of the Democratic Federation of North and East Syria until 2024.

== Early life ==
=== Childhood ===
Îbrahîm was born in Mabeta in the province of Aleppo, part of the Afrin Region. It is unclear exactly how her family ended up in Mabeta, with one theory suggesting that her family was forced to flee the Tunceli Province during the Dersim rebellion in 1937–38. However, the theory lacks evidence and it is generally believed her family originated from one of two possible cities in Turkey, Kahramanmaraş or Adiyaman.

=== Teacher in Aleppo ===
Îbrahîm spent considerable time in Aleppo, working as a teacher for twenty-five years. She began teaching in her early twenties, in 1987, before moving to the city of Afrin amidst the unrest and uncertainty of the Syrian Civil War in 2012.

== Term as Prime Minister of Afrin Region ==
=== Appointment as prime minister ===
After the Syrian Government forces pulled out of the region in 2012, amidst the Syrian Civil War, the framework of the Rojava movement became a reality. On 29 January 2014, as the Afrin Canton declared autonomy, following similar declarations earlier in the month by the Kobane and Jazira, Îbrahîm was appointed prime minister. Her appointment marked the highest political position a Kurdish woman had held in modern times and she was the only female prime minister appointed of the three Rojava cantons. In an interview in 2014, she stated the declaration of autonomy was, in part, a response to the PYD having been excluded from the Geneva II conference, declaring that Rojava would not recognize any decision made by the conference.

=== International diplomacy ===
As prime minister, she attended meetings with officials from European Parliament as part of an Afrin Canton delegation that included Sûleyman Cafer, Cihan Muhammed, Foreign Minister and Deputy Foreign Minister, respectively, and PYD European Executive Committee member Ibrahim Ibrahim. In November 2014, the delegation met with multiple groups including, Elmar Brok, head of the European Parliament's Foreign Relations Commission, Gabi Zimmer, President of Left Group, and Rebecca Harms, co-president of Green Group. The delegation discussed topics ranging from their military struggle with ISIS and al Nusra, their vision for a model of democratic autonomy, to their expectations of assistance from Europe given their various impending threats.

Between 2015 and 2017, she gave various statements to Arab, Western, Kurdish, and PKK media outlets about the situation in Afrin and called Abdullah Öcalan the leader of the Kurdish people with their principles based on his teachings.

=== Military Conflicts ===
==== Relative Peace and End of Al Nusra Truce (2014–2015) ====
The Afrin Canton was the least affected Rojava canton by the combat of the Syrian Civil War, given they did not share a border with the Islamic State. Îbrahîm described it in a 30 July 2014 interview as, "comparatively quiet," stating, "At this point, we have a sort of coexistence with the FSA and the government troops stationed in Nubl. As long as they don't attack us, we don't attack them." In the same interview in 2014, Îbrahîm showed optimism regarding the tranquility and diversity that had been achieved in Afrin, despite the ongoing regional conflict; "We have Sunnis, Shiites, Yazidi, and Alevi here who live together peacefully. In Afrin, there are Kurds, Arabs, and other minorities who have no problems with each other. They share a certain cohesion, which shows that this could also be the case in other parts of Syria."

By early 2015, YPG fighters in the Afrin region had reached a truce with al Nusra, while the PKK and Turkey ceasefire continued. This lack of violence allowed for the further political and cultural development of the Rojava framework in Afrin.

On 25 July 2015, the PKK formally ended its ceasefire with the Turkish forces after the PKK was blamed for the death of four Turkish police officials and Turkish forces retaliated by bombing PKK camps in Iraq. Around a month after, the fragile truce held between al Nusra and Afrin YPG fighters came to an end following the mortar shelling of villages near Jinderis, in Afrin. The attack marked the first instance of violence in the region since February 2015, killing five civilians and injuring dozens more. The YPG forces responded with artillery fire on the al Nusra headquarters.

==== Turkish Aggression and Russian Alliance (February 2016 – January 2018) ====
On 19 February 2016, after indicating that they may send ground forces into Syria, Turkey began shelling the city of Afrin and other Kurdish villages, killing at least five civilians. Additionally, al Nusra joined in the attack, shelling various Kurdish headquarters throughout Afrin. The Turkish forces attacked from Kilis, in the north, and Sucukoy, in the west, with the Turkish crossing about 1000 feet into northern Syria. The Turkish forces operation was an attempt to cutoff the YPG from connecting the Afrin and Kobane cantons, while also carving out territory for a wall to be constructed along Syria's northern border for "security and to prevent smuggling." For over a year, Turkish and Afrin YPG forces participated in on-again, off-again conflict, mainly involving Turkey targeting the Afrin city and countryside with artillery strikes.

In April 2017, Russian forces arrived in northern Syria as part of an agreement between Afrin YPG commanders and Russian military command in Syria. Russian forces set up a military installation in northern region of Afrin, along the Turkish border. The presence of Russian troops was seen as an attempt by the Afrin region to deter a Turkish Army invasion of YPG controlled positions.

==== Operation Olive Branch and Turkish Occupation (January 2018 – present) ====
On 19 January 2018, the Turkish government announced Operation Olive Branch to "establish security and stability on our borders and region, to eliminate terrorists of PKK/KCK/PYD-YPG and Daesh." The operation directly declared Îbrahîm's party, the PYD, and its affiliates as main targets, while labeling the group terrorists to justify the invasion. Regarding the first weekend of skirmishes and heavy bombardment, Îbrahîm described the situation; "Most of the wounded are civilians. There are clashes. There's artillery and shelling. Our units are fiercely responding to the occupation."

On 22 January, Îbrahîm was urgent in her opinion piece in the Washington Post, she's quoted, "Washington must act soon. Time is running out. U.S. diplomacy appears to be having little effect on Turkey, and this is not a surprise." She pointed to the fact that U.S. troops never were needed in Afrin to dispel the Islamic State as the reason for the lack of adequate defense capabilities of the Afrin YPG. She explained, "the fact that IS never took control of our region has limited the American presence here, and we are now paying the price. Unlike some other regions of northern Syria, we do not have U.S. military bases or even military observers." In addition to calling for assistance from the U.S., she attacked Turkish President Recep Tayyip Erdogan, stating, "He accuses all Kurds of being terrorists by virtue of their birth. But, today it is not only the Kurds who are being attacked by Erdogan. Turkish prisons are filled with peaceful political activists from a wide variety of backgrounds, yet all are accused of terrorism." She accused Erdogan of wanting to remove the "freedom" to a "democratic alternative" in the region and of pushing for an ethnic cleansing of Kurds after discussing implementing a policy of Arabization, to return the region to "its rightful owners." In a final appeal for moral justice, Îbrahîm stated, "We should not be destroyed because our struggle for democracy and freedom curtails Erdogan's ambitions. We should not be destroyed because we kept IS and al-Qaeda out of our region. By the end of January, the Turkish forces had made "minimal" territorial progress into Afrin with both sides suffering numerous casualties and thousands of civilians from the region being displaced as a result of the operation.

On 9 February, one day following the removal of a temporary no fly zone that had been in place for four days by Russia, with Turkey claiming the death of over one thousand "terrorists," Îbrahîm and other Afrin administrative leaders held a press conference discussing the region's reaction to the operation. Îbrahîm had harsh words for the Turkish forces, claiming the Afrin civilian death count had reached at least 160 by this point, including twenty-six children. Echoing her statement from weeks past, she criticized Erdogan's tactics and intentions. She accused the Turkish army of "targeting infrastructure, including mosques, schools, dams, water pumping stations, and food depots." Additionally, she called upon the United Nations Security Council to end the alleged human rights violations by the Turkish, and their allies, and take a firm stand to end human suffering in the region.

On 18 March, Turkish forces and their Free Syrian Army allies raised the Turkish flag in a deserted Afrin after pushing out Afrin YPG resistance fighters and displacing thousands of civilians to secure the city. After gaining control of the city, the Turkish fighters and their allies occupied the city and intermittently engaged in skirmishes with remaining resistance and insurgency fighters, while looting the city.

Among those who had fled the region due to the Turkish advance was Îbrahîm, who spoke at a meeting of Afrin women in the al-Shahba canton on 9 May 2018. She called upon the people of Afrin to be proud of the historic nature of their resistance, "Our peoples must be proud of their resistance which has put its mark in the history of resistances of the peoples who call for their freedom and who are stuck to their land and identity. This resistance will be perpetuated by history because the resistance of our people for fifty-eight days proved to the world that our people have the will of strong resistance based on the adherence to the martyrs' blood."

Despite the Turkish occupation, she remained clear that the goal was a return to Afrin, "The departure of our people from Afrin was not by their will as you know, but they were forced to do so in order to preserve their lives and dignity from the brutality of the Turkish terrorism and its mercenaries, our people did not surrender and they are still continuing the Resistance of the Age in their second stage. The resistance of the People and Women's Protection Units is also continuing in Afrin, and our people must be certain that we will all return together to Afrin thanks to this resistance."

In the same 9 May meeting, she again alleged abusive conditions from the Turkish occupiers yet still declared that the resistance will not be eliminated, "The Turkish occupation army and its mercenaries want to undermine the will of our people through the propaganda that they publish among the people stating that the situation in Afrin is safe even though we hear on a daily basis the cases of kidnapping, killing, torture, and rape practiced by the occupation army and its mercenaries against our people who remained in Afrin. These conditions and the presence of the occupiers and mercenaries on our soil are extremely dangerous because this enemy is ruthless and its goal is to annihilate our people and eliminate the spirit of resistance. Therefore, our people must be certain that Afrin will be liberated sooner or later from the Turkish occupation and its mercenaries, and then, we will all return together with our heads up."

Later in May, she also criticized the "silence of the Syrian sides" in regards to the Turkish occupation. The Turkey and its allied forces have remained in control of the region since Operation Olive Branch.

== Interior Affairs Committee Co-Chair ==
On 3 October 2018, the Northern and Eastern Syria Autonomous Administration Executive Assembly, essentially the governing body of all regions of Rojava, held a meeting to elect the executives of the committees in the assembly. Îbrahîm was elected co-chair of the Interior Affairs Committee alongside fellow co-chair Ali Mustafa Heco. Typical to the Rojava model, one man and one woman head each committee.

On 17 October, two weeks following her election, she detailed the gruesome costs of conflict in the war-torn region, "Those who promote war do not think about the people. Not thinking of the civilian population and spreading terror and its brutality has left millions of Syrian people out of their land and home. These policies have had a profound effect on the people. Families suffered material damage. Families were separated. They were lost. Many people were killed. In the countries where they migrated, those states promoted those dirty markets. The states have run games on them. They have been political."

== Political views ==
Îbrahîm has no published political manifesto and most of what is known of her views is observed through her actions as a revolutionary. However, Îbrahîm has referred to Abdullah Öcalan as the leader of the Kurdish people and that his teachings have been adopted as principles by Kurds. This is not surprising as her party, the PYD, is ideologically aligned with the banned PKK party, founded by Öcalan in 1978. The party has been banned in Turkey following its armed insurgency that began in 1978.

Given her statements regarding Öcalan's teaching being adopted by the Kurdish people, it makes sense that his theory of Democratic Confederalism as a democratic alternative to the traditional state, can be seen in the administrative set up of the Rojava cantons. Democratic Confederalism involves decisions being made on a local basis with separate regions having complete autonomous control over their assets, with the local communities linked by a common confederation. Its foundations are based in feminism, ecology, and direct democracy. The three autonomous regions of Rojava connected through the Democratic Federation of North and East Syria are an example of this type of political structure.

Îbrahîm has highlighted the importance of her Kurdish, Alevi, and female oppressed identities in forming her political views. She had this to say about women leading the resistance in Rojava, "I want all women, particularly Kurdish women, to be successful. And I can state that Kurdish women will lead all the other women in the world. We want the women of Rojava to participate in self-rule in the administrative level. We want them to work more, because women have always been ignored in the past. Women in Rojava have led the revolution. For this very reason, they need to take their very well deserved posts in the administrations."

== See also ==
- Afrin, Syria
