= Mare' Subdistrict =

Mare' Subdistrict ناحية مارع
- Subdistrict
- Location of Mare' Subdistrict within Aleppo Governorate

- Location in Syria
- Country: Syria
- Governorate: Aleppo
- District: Azaz District
- Seat: Mare'

Area
  - Total: 191.42 km^{2} (73.91 sq mi)

Population (2004)
  - Total: 39,306
  - Density: 205.34/km^{2} (531.83/sq mi)
- Geocode: SY020403

Mare' Subdistrict (Arabic: ناحية مارع, romanized: Nāḥiyah Mare') is a subdistrict of Azaz District in the Aleppo Governorate of northern Syria. The administrative centre is the city of Mare'. Adjacent subdistricts of Azaz District are Tell Rifaat to the west, Sawran to the north and Akhtarin to the east.

At the 2004 census, the subdistrict had a population of 39,306.

== Cities, towns and villages ==
Cities, towns and villages of Mare' Subdistrict
PCode	Name	Population
C1643	Mare'	16,904
C1641	Maarat Umm Hawsh	3,542
C1631	Herbel	3,403
C1640	Fafin	3,183
C1638	Tell Qarah	2,477
C1632	Tell al-Ayn	2,123
C1629	Sunbul	1,003
C1642	Mazra'at al-Ward	937
C1630	Saed - Qlsroj	904
C1639	Qaramel	768
C1637	Hissiyeh	753
—N/a	Salhiyeh	689
C1634	Hosniyeh	605
C1636	Hiwar Elnahr	540
C1633	Alsayed Ali	468
C1635	Tal Madeeq	398
—N/a	Al-Wardiyah	337
C1644	Wahshiyeh	272
