= AHRA =

AHRA may refer to:

- AHRA (robot), a network-based humanoid developed by the Korea Institute of Science and Technology
- Assisted Human Reproduction Act
- Audio Home Recording Act, a 1993 amendment to US copyright law

== See also ==
- Ahras, Syria
