= Tell Qarah =

Tell Qarah تلقراح
- Village
- Location of Tell Qarah in Syria
- Coordinates: 36°22′30″N 37°10′56″E
- Country: Syria
- Governorate: Aleppo
- District: Azaz
- Subdistrict: Mare'
- Elevation: 484 m (1,588 ft)

Population (2004)
  - Total: 2,477
- Time zone: UTC+2 (EET)
  - Summer (DST): UTC+3 (EEST)
- Geocode: C1638

Tell Qarah (Arabic: تلقراح, romanized: Tall Qarāḥ), also spelled Tal Qarah or Tel Qarah, is a village in northern Aleppo Governorate, northwestern Syria. Administratively part of Nahiya Mare' in A'zaz District, it had a population of 2,477 as per the 2004 census. Nearby localities include Ihras to the northwest, Herbel to the north, Maarat Umm Hawsh to the northeast, and Tell Jabin to the southwest.

On 30 August 2016, the SDF captured the village from ISIL.
