= Ahras =

Ahras احرص
- Village
- Location of Ahras in Syria
- Coordinates: 36°24′02″N 37°08′38″E
- Country: Syria
- Governorate: Aleppo
- District: Azaz
- Subdistrict: Tell Rifaat

Population (2004)
  - Total: 2,851
- Time zone: UTC+3 (AST)
- Geocode: C1623

Ahras (Arabic: احرص, also spelled Ehras, Ihras, Ahrez, or Ehrez) is a village in northern Aleppo Governorate, northwestern Syria. Administratively belonging to Nahiya Tell Rifaat in A'zaz District, it had a population of 2,851 as per the 2004 census. Nearby localities include Kafr Naya to the west, Tell Rifaat to the north, Herbel and Mare' to the northeast, Maarat Umm Hawsh to the east, Tell Qarah to the southeast and Tell Jabin to the south.
