= Shaykh Issa =

Shaykh Issa الشيخ عيسى
- Town
- Location of Shaykh Issa in Syria
- Coordinates: 36°28′46″N 37°08′50″E
- Country: Syria
- Governorate: Aleppo
- District: Azaz
- Subdistrict: Tell Rifaat

Population (2004)
  - Total: 4,296
- Time zone: UTC+3 (AST)
- Geocode: C1624

Shaykh Issa (Arabic: الشيخ عيسى) is a town in northern Aleppo Governorate, northwestern Syria. Located north of Aleppo, it is administratively part of Nahiya Tell Rifaat in A'zaz District. Nearby localities include Tell Rifaat to the west, Kaljibrin to the north and Mare' to the east. In the 2004 census, Shaykh Issa had a population of 4,296. The town is at 36.47926 ° N 37.14506 ° E

== See also ==
- Sheikh Issa Elashury
