= Tell Jabin =

Tell Jabin تل جبين
- Village
- Location of Tell Jabin in Syria
- Coordinates: 36°21′24″N 37°08′39″E
- Country: Syria
- Governorate: Aleppo
- District: Azaz
- Subdistrict: Tell Rifaat

Population (2004)
  - Total: 2,579
- Time zone: UTC+3 (AST)
- Geocode: C1617

Tell Jabin (Arabic: تل جبين) is a town in northern Syria, administratively part of the A'zaz District of Aleppo Governorate, located north of Aleppo. Nearby localities include Tell Rifaat and Kafr Naya to the north, Mare' to the northeast, Bayanoun, Mayer and al-Zahraa to the west. According to the Syria Central Bureau of Statistics, Tell Jabin had a population of 2,579 in the 2004 census.
