= Tell Amarna (Syria) =

Archaeological Site in northern Syria

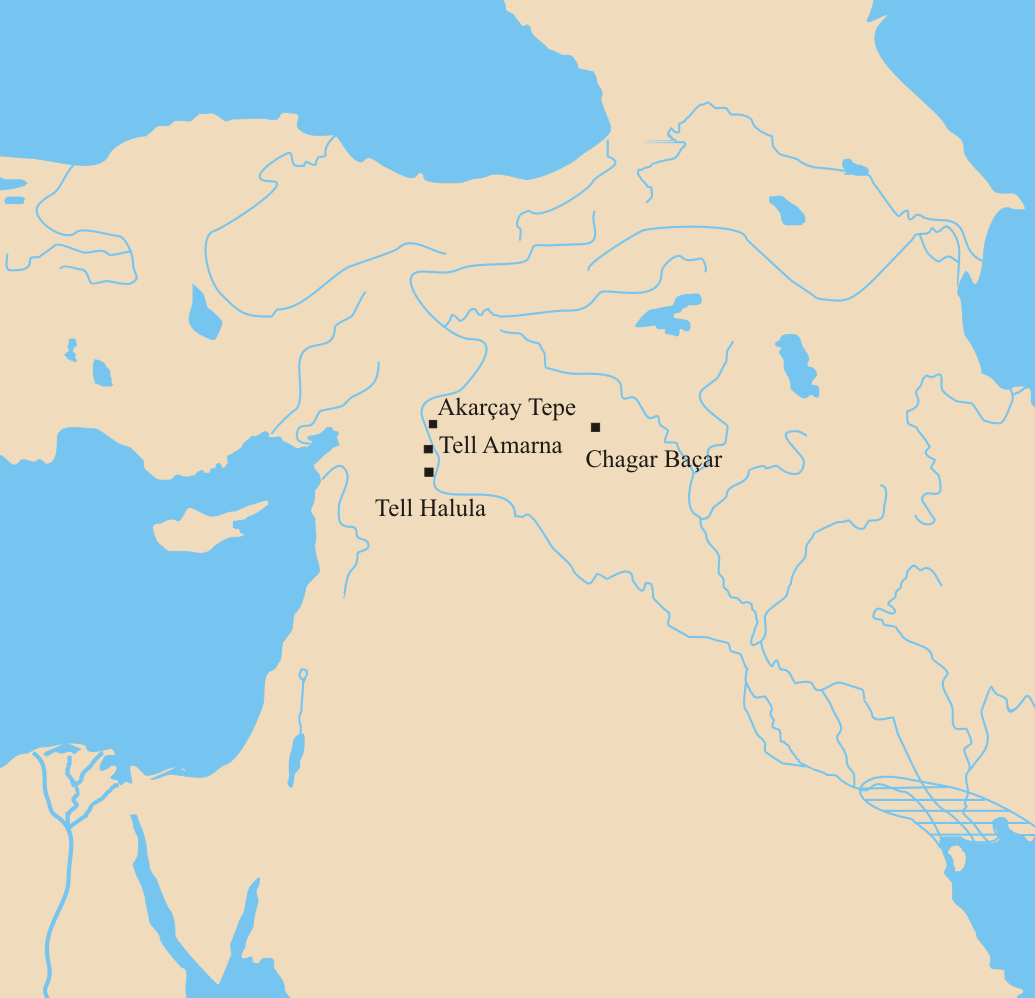

Tell Amarna is an archaeological site near the village Amarnah in northern Syria, on the west bank of the Euphrates. The site is 8 km south of Jerablus.

== History ==
=== Neolithic ===
==== Halaf period ====
About 0.5 km from the main tell is a Halaf site along the tributary wadi of the Euphrates River, with pottery belonging to the late Halaf period (IIB; c. 4900-4500 BCE).

== Archaeological research ==
The site was investigated as part of the archaeological salvage excavations conducted due to the building of the Tishrin Dam on the Euphrates. From 1991 to 1998, a mission from the University of Liège, directed by Önhan Tunca, worked there at the invitation of the Syrian Direction Générale des Antiquités et Museums. Eight excavation seasons carried out on the 20-m-high tell revealed layers dating from the Halaf culture (6th millennium BC) through the Byzantine period (5th century AD). After the discovery of a basilica, dated to the 5th century AD, archaeologists and conservators from the Polish Centre of Mediterranean Archaeology University of Warsaw were asked to assist in the restoration and interpretation of this building. The Polish team was headed by Dr. Tomasz Waliszewski (Institute of Archaeology of the University of Warsaw) and Dr. Krzysztof Chmielewski (Academy of Fine Arts in Warsaw). In 2000 and 2001, archaeologists and conservators from Belgium, Poland, and Syria worked at the site. More than 40 mosaic fragments were transported to a storeroom in Damascus where they underwent conservation in 2004–2005. Thirteen of them formed the core of the exhibition "Tell Amarna in Syria; From the 6th Millennium BC Painted Pottery to the Byzantine Mosaics", which was presented in 2005 first in Belgium and then in Poland, in the State Archaeological Museum in Warsaw.

== See also ==
- Euphrates Syrian Pillar Figurines
- Euphrates Handmade Syrian Horses and Riders
