= Maarat Umm Hawsh =

Ma'arat Umm Hawsh معراتة أم حوش
- Village
- Location of Ma'arat Umm Hawsh in Syria
- Coordinates: 36°24′51″N 37°12′38″E
- Country: Syria
- Governorate: Aleppo
- District: Azaz
- Subdistrict: Mare'

Population (2004)
  - Total: 3,403
- Time zone: UTC+2 (EET)
  - Summer (DST): UTC+3 (EEST)
- Geocode: C1641

Ma'arat Umm Hawsh (Arabic: معراتة أم حوش, also spelled Maarateh Om Hosh) is a village in northern Aleppo Governorate, northwestern Syria. It is administered as part of the Nahiya Mare' in the A'zaz District. Nearby localities include Mare' to the north, Tell Qarah to the southwest, Ahras to the west and Herbel to the northwest. Umm Hawsh has population of 3,542 as per the 2004 census.
