= Tilalyan =

Tilalyan (Arabic: تلالين Tlālayn) also known as Til Alyan is a village in northern Aleppo Governorate, northwestern Syria. It is located at 37.14439 36.43264 on the Queiq Plain, northeast of Azaz, north of the city of Aleppo, and south of the border to the Turkish province of Kilis. The village lies just outside of the town of Mare'.

The village has a population of 7,200 people, of which Arabs comprise 83,5% and Kurds 16,5%. The village has seen sustained fighting in the Syrian civil war and was taken by the Free Syrian Army on 16 October 2016.

The village is roughly square in shape, 500 m by 500m and has a mosque.
