= Neirab steles =

Ancient funerary stela

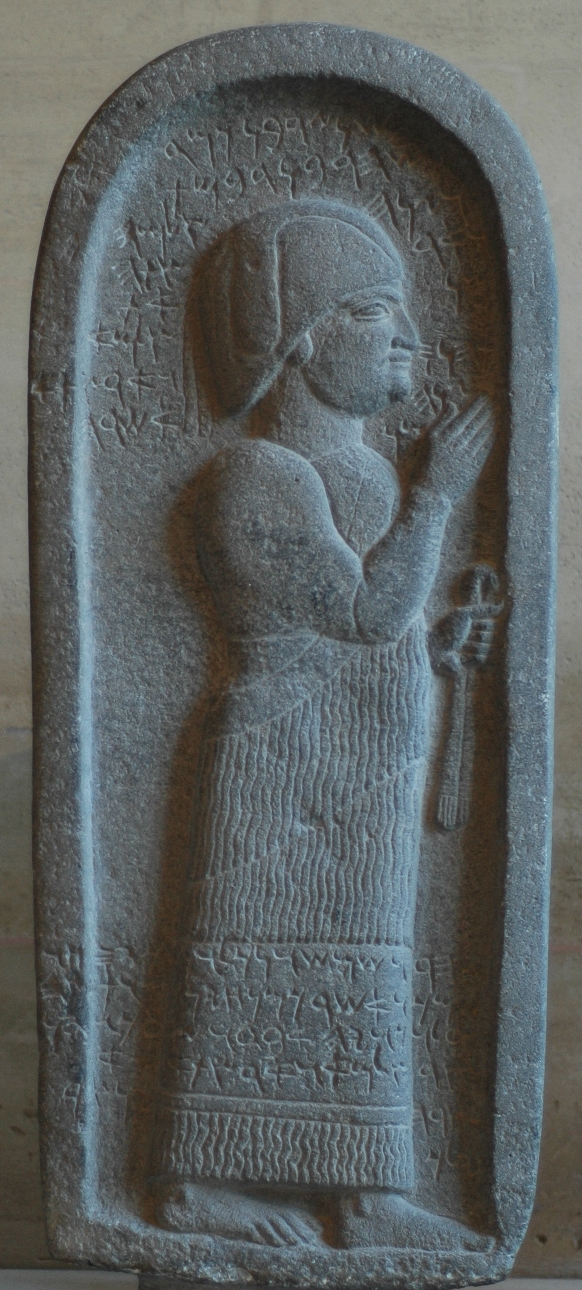
Sin zir Ibni (𐤔𐤍𐤆𐤓𐤁𐤍, ŠNZRBN) inscription

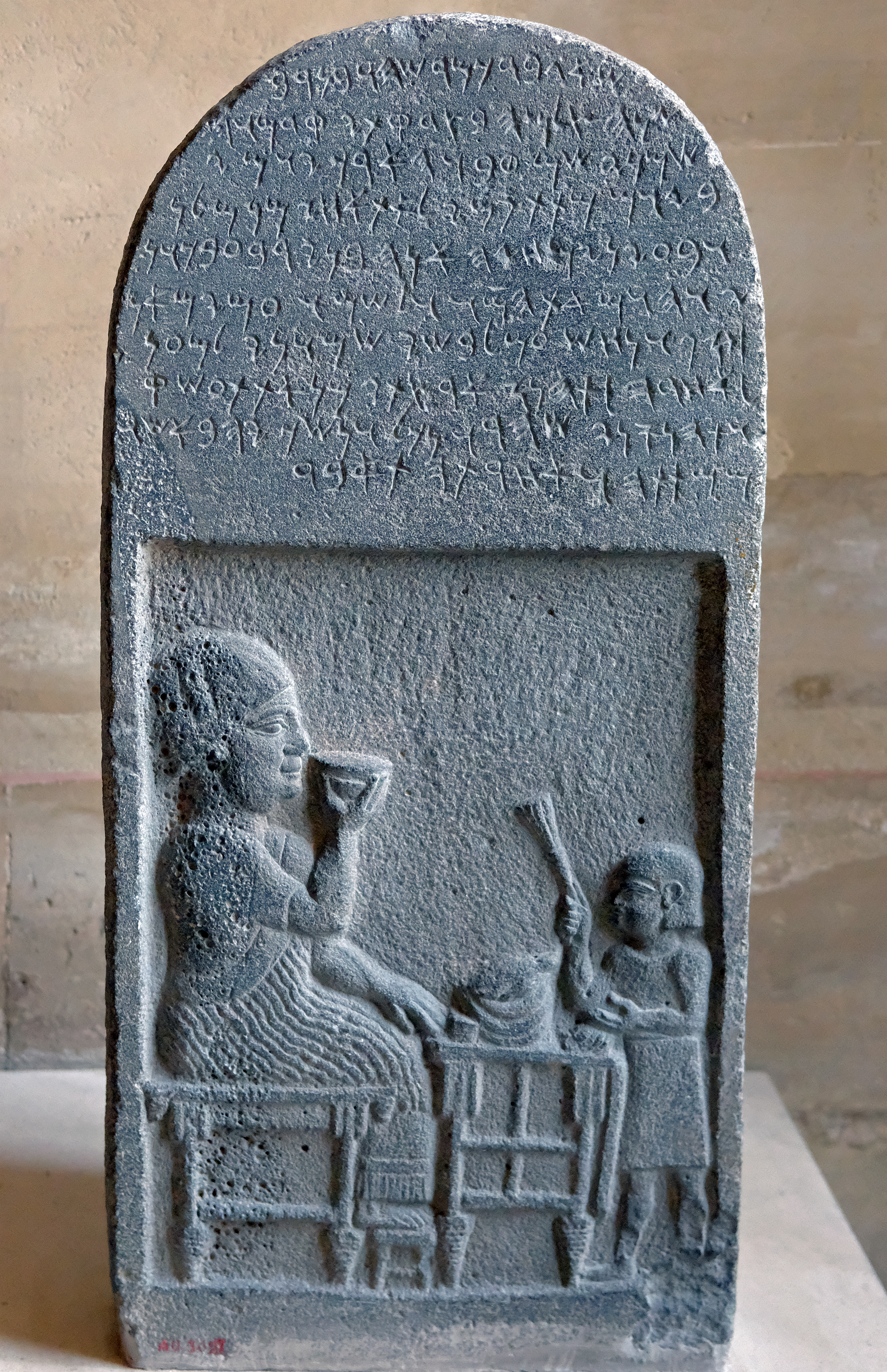
Si Gabbor (𐤔𐤀𐤂𐤁𐤓, ŠʾGBR) stele

The Neirab steles are two 7th-century BC steles with Aramaic inscriptions found in 1891 in Al-Nayrab (𐤍𐤓𐤁, NRB in the inscriptions) near Aleppo, Syria. They are currently in the Louvre. They were discovered in 1891 and acquired by Charles Simon Clermont-Ganneau for the Louvre on behalf of the Commission of the Corpus Inscriptionum Semiticarum. The steles are made of black basalt, and the inscriptions note that they were funerary steles. The inscriptions are known as KAI 225 (Sin zir Ibni inscription) and KAI 226 (Si Gabbor stele).

== Discovery ==
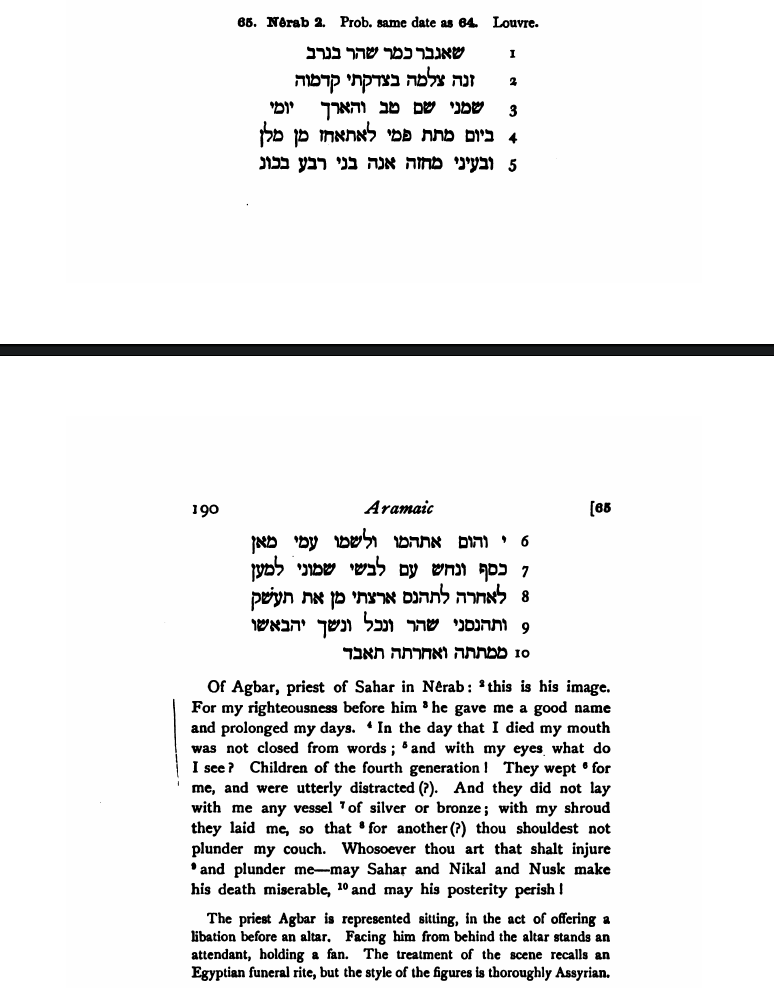

On 11 November 1891, Adrien Barthélemy, then dragoman at France's Aleppo consulate, wrote to Charles Simon Clermont-Ganneau, with information provided to him by the Franciscan priest R.P. Paul de Saint-Aignan (Simoneau) as follows:

"Very recently, workers repairing terraces, on a hillock in the village of Nerab near Aleppo, unearthed a stone representing an offering underneath which is a Phoenician inscription. I did not see the subject, but I saw a stamping of the inscription made by a French cleric".

Clermont-Ganneau wrote to Ernest Renan, who was still in charge of the Corpus Inscriptionum Semiticarum, who replied that the "mouth watering" letter may well be referring to an Aramaic counterpart to a stele found shortly before by the German excavators at Sam'al. This enthusiasm dampened after German expert Julius Euting questioned the authenticity of the steles after having reviewed a squeeze.

The steles were purchased from the landowner by Nicolas Marcopoli, a notable Aleppo merchant family (for whom the Souq Marcopoli is named). Marcopoli offered the steles to Léon Heuzey at the Louvre for 10,000 Francs; Heuzey, who was at the time focused on the excavations at Girsu in Mesopotamia, turned down the offer. Clermont-Ganneau resolved to acquire the steles himself, which he did via two-year-long negotiations led by the Franciscan brothers and the French Consulate. In 1894 he successfully acquired the steles for 2,000 Francs, with funds from the Académie des Inscriptions et Belles-Lettres; the reduced price was due to the doubts about authenticity. The steles were then transported to Paris over land, in a two-year journey, and acquired by the Louvre in January 1897 for 2,500 Francs.

== Bibliography ==
- Clermont-Ganneau Charles. Deux stèles de Nerab In: Comptes rendus des séances de l'Académie des Inscriptions et Belles-Lettres, 40^{e} année, N. 2, 1896. pp. 118–120. DOI : https://doi.org/10.3406/crai.1896.70732
- Clermont-Ganneau, Charles, "Mitteilung über die Inschriften von Nērab." CRAIBL 4/24 (1896): 118–19
- Clermont-Ganneau, Charles, Les Stèles Araméennes de Néirab (missing pages online here), Études d'archéologie orientale. Bibliothèque de l'École des Hautes Études], Sciences historiques et philologiques vol. 113. Paris: F. Viewig, 1897
- Halévy, J., "Les deux stèles de Nerab." RevSém 4 (1896): 279–84
- Hoffmann, G., "Aramäische Inschriften aus Nērab bei Aleppo: Neue und alte Götter." ZA 11 (1896): 207–92
- Halévy, J., "Nouvelles remarques sur les inscriptions de Nērab." RevSém 4 (1896b): 369–73.
- Halévy, J., "Un dernier mot sur les inscriptions de Nērab." RevSém 5 (1897a): 189–90
- Kokovtsov, P., "Drevnearameyskie nadpisi iz Niraba bliz Aleppo." Zapiski Vostochnogo otdeleniya Rysskogo arkheologicheskogo obshchestva 12 (1899): 145–78
- Kokovtsov, P., "Nouvel essai d'interprétation de la seconde inscription araméenne de Nirab." JA sér 9, tome 14 (1899): 432–45.
- Kokovtsov, P., "Imena zhretsov v Nirabskikh Nadpisyakh." Zapiski Vostochnogo otdeleniya Rysskogo arkheologicheskogo obshchestva 13 (1900): 93–97.
- Catherine Fauveaud-Brassaud, Hélène Lozachmeur. Les stèles araméennes de Nérab (Syrie), Leurs dé- couverte et acquisition dans le contexte de la concurrence archéologique européenne au Proche-Orient. F. Briquel-Chatonnet, C. Fauveaud-Brassaud et I. Gajda. Entre Carthage et l'Arabie heureuse: mélanges offerts à François Bron, Paris, De Boccard, pp. 333–346, 2013, Orient et Méditerranée, 12, 978-2-7018-0339-5. halshs-00966060
