= Euphrates Syrian Pillar Figurines =

Archaeological figurines

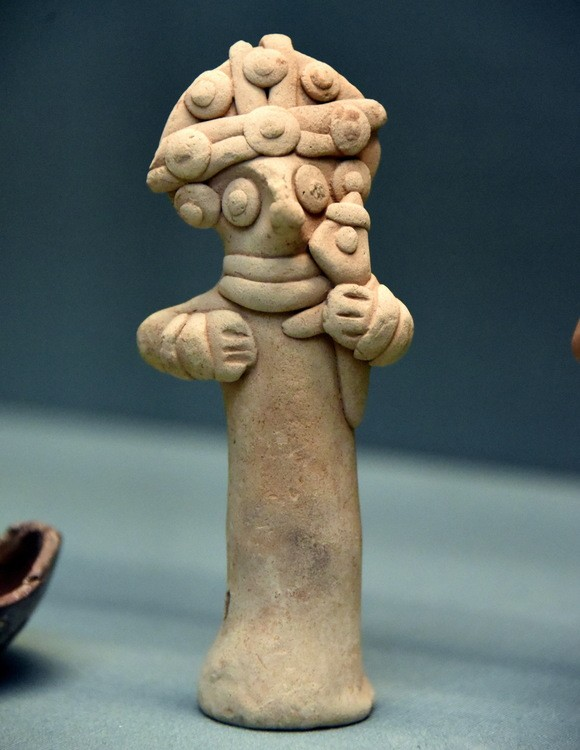
EU_SPF holding a child from Karkemish. The British Museum, London (museum no. 108757).

The Euphrates Syrian Pillar Figurines (EU_SPF's) are anthropomorphic clay figurines dating from the late Iron Age period (mid 8th–7th centuries BCE) and produced in the Middle Euphrates region. These figurines are part of a greater coroplastic production mainly composed of handmade horse-rider figurines, i.e. the Euphrates Handmade Syrian Horses and Riders (EU_HSHR's).

== Other names in literature ==
The actual nomenclature adopted for this class of figurines has been recently proposed in a doctoral research. Their current name recalls both their geographic origin and the shape of their bodies, which are hollow, tubular, and sometimes twice grooved at the base. However, one may find their appearance in literature with different nomenclatures:

- Baked Clay Handmade Freestanding Figurines or Syrian Terracottas – Free-standing handmodelled
- Nordyrische Pfeilerfigurinen (NPF)
- Standing or Pillar figurines

== Technical characteristics ==
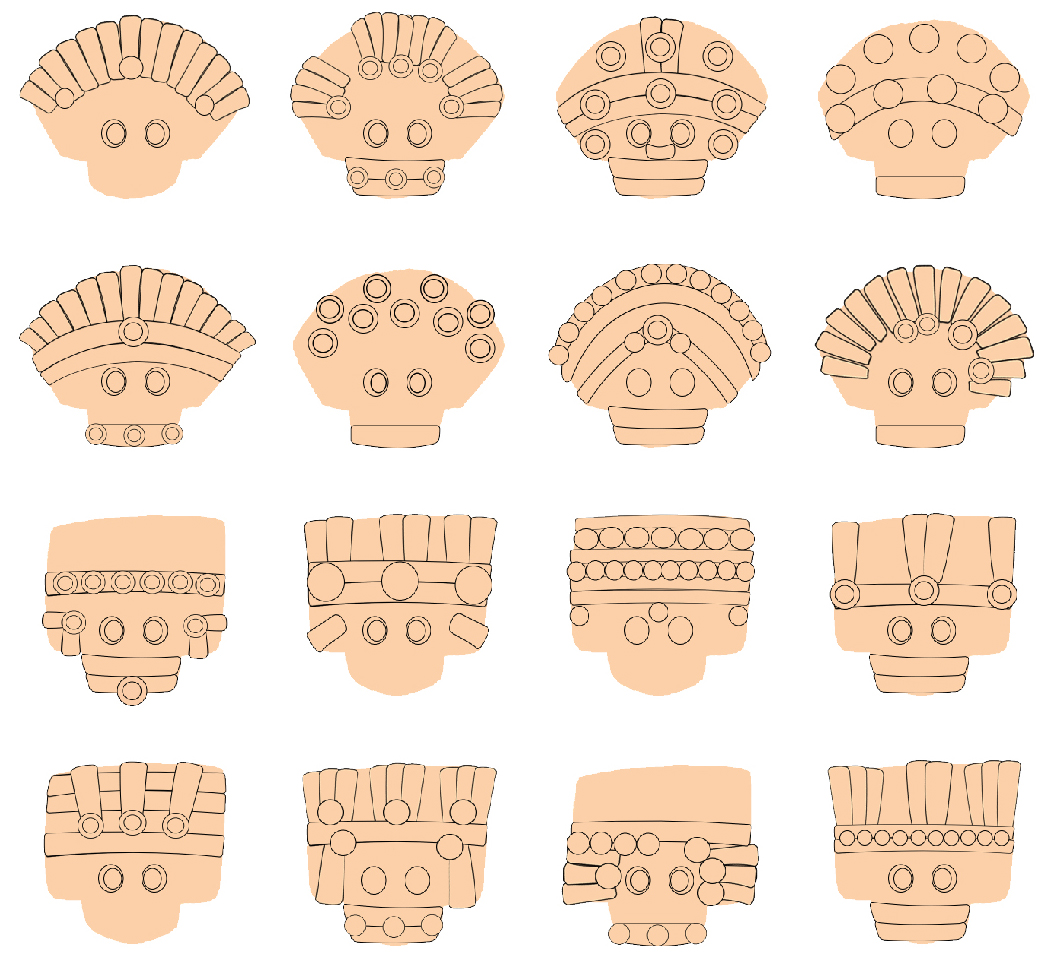
EU SPF's headdresses decorations. Graphic B.Bolognani.

=== Modelling ===
The clay figurines are completely handmade and free standing, in the fact, the name EU SPF's comes from their typical tubular bodies. The shape of the body is concave at the base to allow them to stand, the feet can be rendered through a central protruding piece of clay in the middle of the frontal part. They were usually held with one hand with the other one was engaged in modelling details. This was the so-called "snowman" technique, which allows working figurines in a three-dimensional space. The object is shaped all-around, preferring the under part of the figurine's body as base of support. Unlike figurines made with molds, these figurines could be viewed from all sides, although the front part is the preferred view. This characteristic can be appreciated by observing some headdresses, being well rendered in the front side, while to the back is not given special interest. Among the modelling tools apart from fingers one should mention a pointed wooden stick for the characterization of anatomical features, especially fingers, but also particular ornaments. Other more rarely used tools were floral patterns and combs.

=== Decorations and colours ===
This production is characterized by abundant decorations directly applied on the figurine's body through strips and blobs of clay. Decorations are used to stress anatomical features—such as the eyes and the hairstyles—as well as fabric patterns of the attires or decorative items, like the jewellery. The fabric colours of the clay are quite uniform, suggesting that the figurines were all well-fired. A pale brown slip has been observed in surface, while it seems that these figurines were not painted.

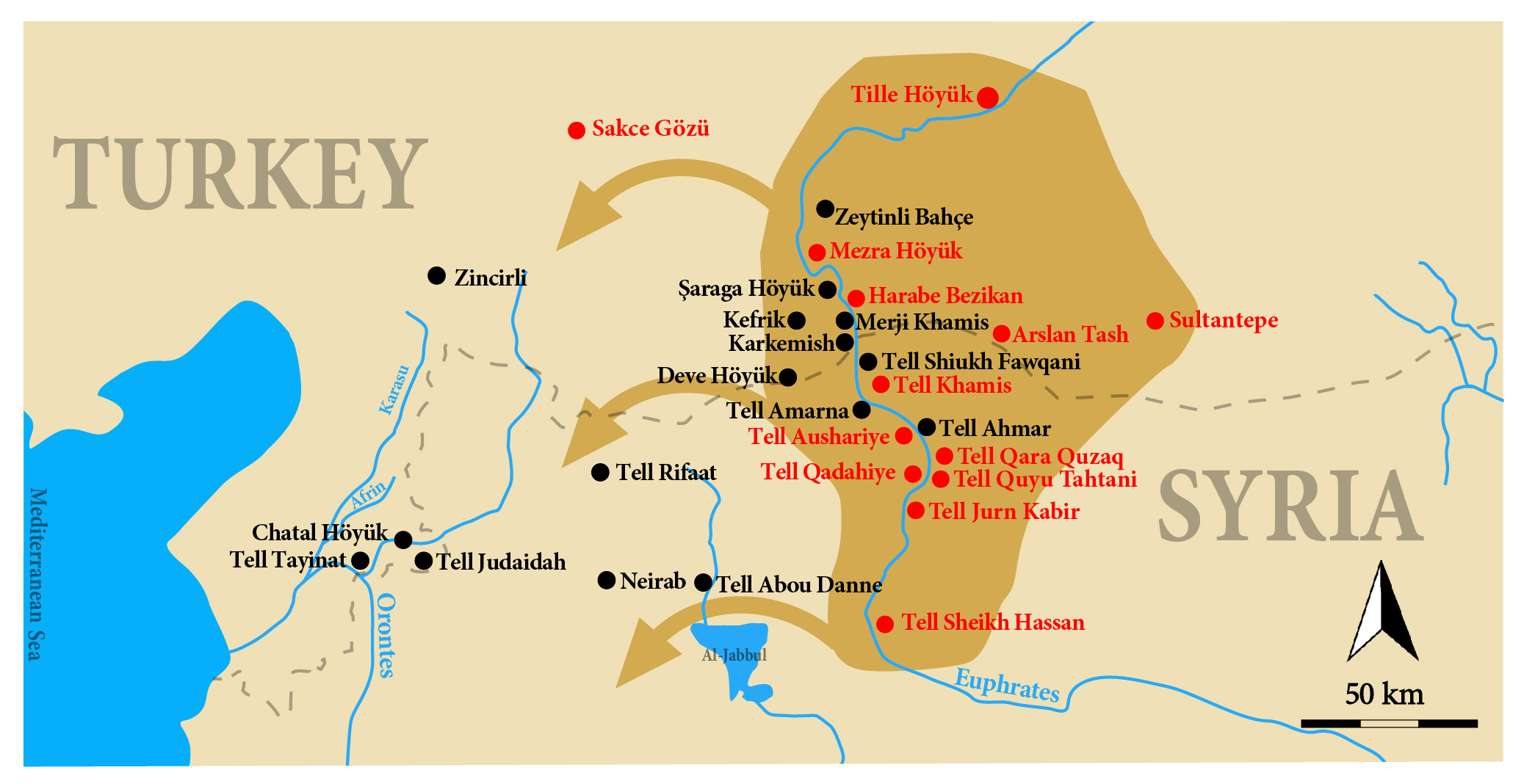
Sites with secure (black) and tentative (red) presence of SPF's and HSHR's (black) from the Middle Euphrates Valley. Graphic B.Bolognani.

== Geographical spread ==
EU_HSHR's figurines are attested only west of the Euphrates and in particular, the Euphrates band seems to be the main productive centre. From this area several specimens have been collected at Karkemish, Tell Ahmar, Tell Amarna, Deve Höyük, Tell Shiukh Fawqani, Saraga Höyük, and Zeytinli Bahçe Höyük. This production has been linked only to those sites with a strong Neo-Assyrian presence as a result of prolonged control of some urban-sized centres on the Euphrates. Indeed, these figurines do not appear in other nearby sites where the Neo-Assyrian invasion caused a socio-economic impoverishment. These are sites such as Tell Sheikh Hassan, Tell Qara Quzaq, Tell Qara Quyu Tahtani, and Tell Khamis. Outside the Euphrates' catchment area, sporadic finds are spread towards West in sites like Zincirli Höyük, Tell Judaidah, Chatal Höyük, Tell Tayinat, Tell Abu Danne, and likely in Tell Rifaat and Neirab.

== Chronology ==
According to contextual data, these figurines are attested in some Middle Euphrates sites during the mature Iron Age. In archaeological contexts, such artefacts usually come from upper layers dating from the Neo-Assyrian period (7th century BCE), but the origin of this production may be identified at the end of Neo-Syrian period (mid/end-8th century BCE). Indeed, at the site of Karkemish the major part of finds belonged to Iron III layers, while a minor part was retrieved in Iron II ones.

== Museums collections ==
Museum	Provenience	Nos. of figurines	Museum Nos.
British Museum, London	Karkemish, Yunus, Middle Euphrates cemeteries	20	104476, 105041, 105042, 105043,105044, 105045, 105050, 105051, 105052, 105053, 105054, 105055, 105057, 105098, 108757, 116182, 116326, 138204, 138205, H80.21
Ashmolean Museum, Oxford	Karkemish, Deve Höyük, Kefrik, Middle Euphrates cemeteries	9	AN1913.447, AN1913.634, AN1914.795, AN1914.796, AN1915.239.36, AN1935.29, AN1935.31, AN1947.341, AN49.47.328
Fitzwilliam Museum, Cambridge	Deve Höyük	1	ANE.80.1913
Museum of the Ancient Near East, Berlin	Deve Höyük	1	VA 07080
Museum of Anatolian Civilizations, Ankara	Karkemish	2	1568,201A, 1569,201A
Istanbul Archaeology Museums, Istanbul	Karkemish	2	5383, 5384
Israel Antiquities Authority, Beith Shemesh	Tel Zeror	1	IAA1966-354
Bible Lands Museum, Jerusalem	North Syria	2	0594, 0598
Israeli National Maritime Museum, Haifa	Unknown	1	3825
Hecht Museum, Haifa	Unknown	1	R-1061
Israel Museum, Jerusalem	Unknown	1	2018.17.144

== See also ==
- Judean pillar figure
- Euphrates Handmade Syrian Horses and Riders
- Carchemish
