= Sunbul =

Sunbul اسنبل
- Village
- Location of Sunbul in Syria
- Coordinates: 36°29′00″N 37°14′47″E
- Country: Syria
- Governorate: Aleppo
- District: Azaz
- Subdistrict: Mare'

Population (2004)
  - Total: 1,003
- Time zone: UTC+2 (EET)
  - Summer (DST): UTC+3 (EEST)
- Geocode: C1629

Sunbul (Arabic: اسنبل), alternatively spelled Asanbel, is a village in northern Aleppo Governorate, northwestern Syria. Located 30 km (19 mi) north of the city of Aleppo and 4 km (2.5 mi) east of Mare', it administratively belongs to Nahiya Mare' in A'zaz District. Nearby localities include Arshaf 4 km (2.5 mi) to the southwest and Ghaytun 5 km (3.1 mi) to the east. In the 2004 census, Sunbul had a population of 1,003.
