= Al-Nayrab =

Village in Syria, to the south-east of the city of Aleppo in northern Syria

Al-Nayrab النيرب
- District
- Location within Syria
- Coordinates: 36°10′32″N 37°13′40″E
- Country: Syria
- Governorate: Aleppo
- District: Mount Simeon
- Subdistrict: Aleppo
- Elevation: 393 m (1,289 ft)

Population (2004 census)
  - Total: 10,018
- Time zone: UTC+2 (EET)
  - Summer (DST): UTC+3 (EEST)

Al-Nayrab (Arabic: النيرب) is a town in Syria, to the south-east of the city of Aleppo in northern Syria. With urban expansion, the village was gradually incorporated into the city of Aleppo, becoming one of its neighbourhoods.

According to the Syria Central Bureau of Statistics, al-Nayrab had a population of 10,018 in the 2004 census.

Al-Nayrab is also an important archaeological site, having been excavated in 1891 by Charles Clermont-Ganneau and again in 1926–27 by A-G Barrois and Bertrand Carrière.

== Etymology ==
Nayrab or Neyrab is the Syriac word for a flat plain and also for a Wadi.

== History ==
The modern settlement initially developed around the Bttiyas Palace, built on the Nayrab hill. The palace was the residence of Salih ibn Ali ibn Abdullah ibn Abbas, the Abbasid governor of Bilad al-Sham (Syria).

For centuries, it was a key village linking Aleppo to the Euphrates, and Old Aleppo retains the Nayrab Gate, one of its nine historic gates. with the urbanization of the 21st century, al-Nayrab came to be absorbed within the city

During the French Mandate, a French military airport was developed in the vicinity, which was transformed after independence into an expansion of Aleppo International Airport.

During WWII, a substantial number of Greeks escaped Nazi-occupied Greece through the island of Chios and were settled in al-Nayrab camp.

After the 1948 war, Palestinian refugees escaping the Nakba settled in the barracks near the French airport, which came to be known as Al-Nayrab camp and boasted a population of 17,844 in 2010.

== Economy ==
Nayrab is characterised by fertile plains where various types of vegetables are grown, in particular cucumbers, alongside certain quantities of olive and pistachio, and Damask rose, domestically known as "Ward Al-Jouri", a key ingredient of perfumes.

== See also ==
- Bab al-Nairab
- Neirab steles
- Euphrates Syrian Pillar Figurines
- Euphrates Handmade Syrian Horses and Riders

== Bibliography ==
- Augustin-Georges Barrois and B. Carrière, Fouilles de l'école archéologique française de Jérusalem effectuées à Neirab du 24 septembre au 5 novembre 1926, pages 126–142, dans Syria, 1927, volume 8, No. 2 (online)
- Augustin-Georges Barrois and B. Carrière, Fouilles de l'école archéologique française de Jérusalem, effectuées à Neirab du 24 septembre au 5 novembre 1926, pages 201–212, dans Syria, 1927, volume 8, No. 3 (online)
- Augustin-Georges Barrois and M. Abel, Fouilles de l'école archéologique française de Jérusalem, effectuées à Neirab du 12 septembre au 6 novembre 1927, pages 187–206, dans Syria, 1928, volume 9, No. 3 (online)
- Augustin-Georges Barrois and M. Abel, Fouilles de l'école archéologique française de Jérusalem, effectuées à Neirab du 12 septembre au 6 novembre 1927, pages 303–319, dans Syria, 1928, volume 9, No. 4 (online)
