= Euphrates Handmade Syrian Horses and Riders =

Assyrian figurines

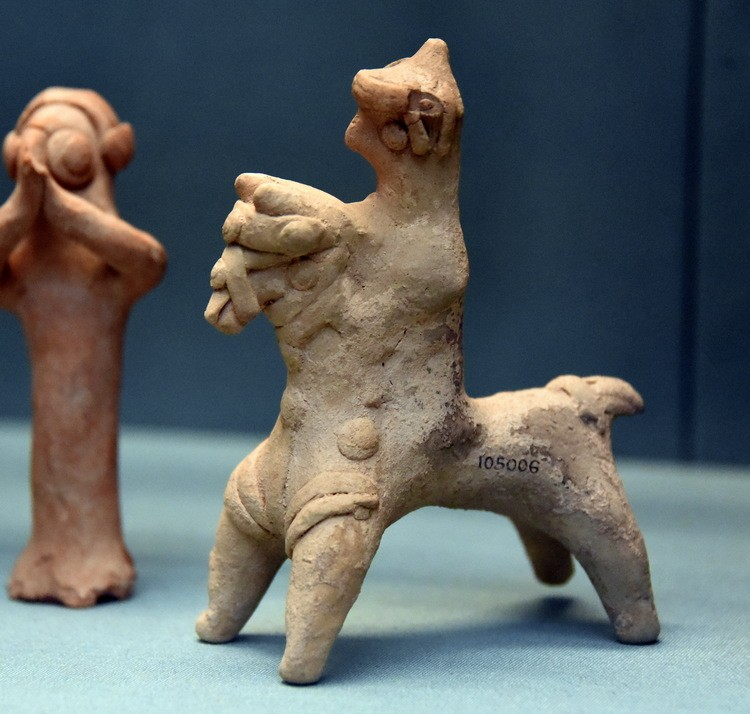
EU_HSHR from Karkemish. The British Museum, London (museum no. 105006).

The Euphrates Handmade Syrian Horses and Riders (EU_HSHRs) are zoomorphic clay figurines representing horses and horses with riders. They date from the late Iron Age period (mid 8th–7th centuries BCE) and were produced in the Middle Euphrates region, alongside anthropomorphic figures known as Euphrates Syrian Pillar Figurines (EU_SPFs).

== Other names in literature ==
The term "Euphrates Handmade Syrian Horses and Riders" has been recently proposed by B. Bolognani. It emphasises their geographic origin, the manufacturing technique, and the portrayed subjects. However, various other terms are also used in scholarly literature:

- Horses and Horsemen or Horse, Horse-and-rider
- Handgemachte Reiterfiguren des 1. Jahrtausends (HR), Typ I(?) ("Handmade rider-figurines of the 1st millennium BC (HR), Type I(?)")
- Horses and Horse Riders

== Technical characteristics ==
=== Modelling ===
The clay figurines are completely handmade and free standing. They were usually held with one hand while the other hand modelled the details. This is known as the “snowman” technique, which allows figurines to be worked in a three-dimensional space. The object is shaped all-around, with the under part of the figurine’s body used as a base of support. Unlike figurines made with moulds, these figurines could be viewed from all sides, although the side is the preferred view.

=== Decorations and colours ===
Decorations made of strips and blobs of clay are directly applied to the figurine’s body. These decorations are used to stress anatomical features and fabric patterns of the riders' clothing and the horses' harnesses. The colour of the clay is quite uniform, suggesting that the figurines were all well-fired. Minor variations could be related to the atmosphere in the kilns. This evidence may also suggest the common use of kilns as in contemporary Neo-Assyrian pottery. The connection with the Neo-Assyrian pottery is further indicated by the surface treatments, usually a pale brown slip and, in a few figurines, a cast of blue-green glaze. In the local ceramic assemblage, this surface treatment usually appears in imported pottery from Assyria and in some polychrome bricks.

No traces of paint have been observed on any of the figurines.

== Geographical spread ==
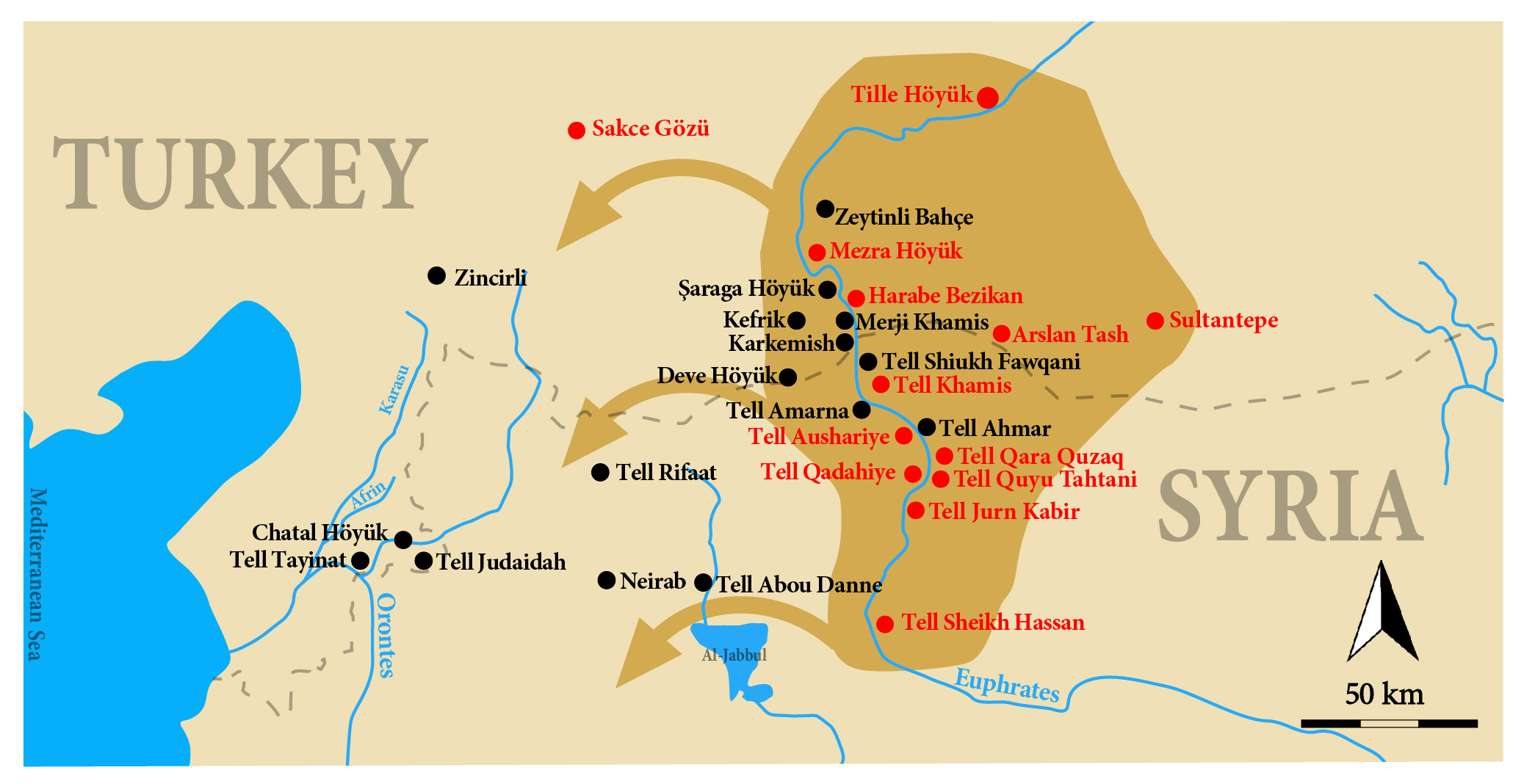
Sites with secure (black) and tentative (red) presence of SPF’s and HSHR’s (black) from the Middle Euphrates Valley (after B. Bolognani)

EU_HSHR figurines are attested only west of the Euphrates and, in particular, the Euphrates valley seems to be the main centre of production. From this area several specimens have been collected at Carchemish, Tell Ahmar, Tell Amarna, Deve Höyük, Tell Shiukh Fawqani, Saraga Höyük, and Zeytinli Bahçe Höyük. The figurines are linked only to sites with a strong Neo-Assyrian presence as a result of prolonged control. The figurines do not appear at other nearby sites where the Neo-Assyrian invasion caused socio-economic impoverishment, such as Tell Sheikh Hassan, Tell Qara Quzaq, Tell Qara Quyu Tahtani, and Tell Khamis. Outside the Euphrates’ catchment area, there are sporadic finds to the west at sites like Zincirli Höyük, Tell Judaidah, Chatal Höyük, Tell Tayinat, Tell Abu Danne, and likely in Tell Rifaat and Neirab.

== Chronology ==
According to contextual data, these figurines are attested in some Middle Euphrates sites during the mature Iron Age. In archaeological contexts, such artefacts usually come from upper layers dating from the Neo-Assyrian period (7th century BCE), but the beginning of production falls at the end of Neo-Syrian period (mid/late 8th century BCE). At the site of Carchemish, for example, the majority of finds belong to Iron Age III layers, but a minority came from Iron Age II layers.

== Museums collections ==
Museum	Provenience	Nos. of figurines	Museum Nos.
British Museum, London	Karkemish, Yunus, Merj Khamis, Middle Euphrates cemeteries	49	92278, 92280, 104475, 104478, 105005, 105006, 105007, 105008,105029,105030, 105031, 105032, 105033, 105034, 105035, 105036,105037,105038, 105039, 105040, 105046, 105047, 105048, 105049,105096,105097, 105099, 108756, 116255, 116318, 116319, 116320,116321, 116322, 116323, 116324, 116325, 116327, 116328, 134620,1922,0511.517.A, 1922,0511.518.A, 1922,0511.519.A,1922,0511.520.A, 1922,0511.521.A, 1922,0511.522.A, 1922,0511.524.A, 1922,0511.525.A, H80.26
Ashmolean Museum, Oxford	Carchemish, Gavourilla, Middle Euphrates cemeteries	7	AN1913.648, AN1913.872, AN1914.131, AN1948.229, AN1962.64,AN1996.44, AN1996.45
Fitzwilliam Museum, Cambridge	Deve Höyük	1	ANE.74.1913
Louvre, Paris	Carchemish	1	AO 9026
Museum of the Ancient Near East, Berlin	Deve Höyük	1	VA 07087
Museum of Anatolian Civilizations, Ankara	Carchemish	2	1577, 1585, 1586, 1582, 1583, 1584, 1587
Israel Museum, Jerusalem	Unknown	1	82.2.1055

== See also ==
- Euphrates Syrian Pillar Figurines

== Bibliography ==
- Bolognani, B. 2017, The Iron Age Figurines from Karkemish (2011–2015 Campaigns) and the Coroplastic Art of the Syro-Anatolian Region, unpublished doctoral dissertation, University of Bologna, Bologna. Bolognani 2017_thesis
- Bolognani, B. 2020a, "The Iron Age Female Figurines from Karkemish and the Middle Euphrates Valley. Preliminary Notes on Some Syrian Pillar Figurines", in Donnat S., Hunziker-Rodewald R., Weygand I. (eds), Figurines féminines nues : Proche-Orient, Égypte, Nubie, Méditerranée, Asie centrale (VIIIe millénaire av. J.-C. - IVe siècle ap. J.-C.), Proceedings of the International Conference “Figurines féminines nues. Proche-Orient, Egypte, Nubie, Méditerranée, Asie centrale”, June 25th-26th 2015, MISHA, Strasbourg, Études d’archéologie et d’histoire ancienne (EAHA), De Boccard, Paris, pp. 209–223.Bolognani 2020a
- Bolognani, B. 2020b, "Figurines as Social Markers: The Neo-Assyrian Impact on the Northern Levant as Seen from the Material Culture", in Gavagnin K., Palermo R. (eds), Imperial Connections. Interactions and Expansions from Assyria to the Roman Period. Proceedings of the 5th “Broadening Horizons” Conference, 5–8 June 2017, Udine(West & East Monografie 2), University of Udine, Udine, pp. 43–57.Bolognani 2020b
- Clayton, V. 2001. Visible Bodies, Resistant Slaves: Towards an Archaeology of the Other: The 7th Century Figurines from Tell Ahmar, unpublished doctoral dissertation, University of Melbourne, School of Fine Arts, Classical Studies and Archaeology, Melbourne.
- Clayton, V. 2013. Figurines, Slaves and Soldiers. The Iron Age Figurines from the Euphrates Valley, North Syria, K&H Publishing, Victoria.
- Moorey P. R. S. 1980, Cemeteries of the First Millenium B.C. at Deve Huyuk, near Carchemish. Salvaged by T. E. Lawrence and C. L. Woolley in 1913 (with a catalogue raisonne of the objects in Berlin, Cambridge, Liverpool, London and Oxford)(«BAR» 87), Bar Publishing, Oxford.
- Moorey P. R. S. 2005, Ancient Near Eastern Terracottas: With a Catalogue of the Collection in the Ashmolean Museum, Ashmolean Museum, Oxford.
- Ornan, T. 1986, A Man and His Land, Highlights from the Moshe Dayan Collection (Israel Museum Catalogue 270), The Israel Museum, Jerusalem.
- Padovani, C. 2019, "36.Cavalier", in Blanchard, V. (ed.), Royaumes oubliés. De l'empire hittite aux Araméens, Liénart, Musée du Louvre, Paris, p. 82.
- Pruss A. 2010, Die Amuq-Terrakotten. Untersuchungen zu den Terrakotta-Figuren des 2. und 1. Jahrtausends v.Chr. aus dem Grabungen des Oriental Institute Chicago in der Amuq-Ebene,(Subartu 26), Brepols, Turnhout.
