= Saraga Höyük =

Archaeological site along the Euphrates river

Şaraga Höyük is an archaeological site along the west bank of the Euphrates River, submerged under the Karkamış Dam, 7 km north of Carchemish in the Gaziantep Province, Turkey.

== History ==
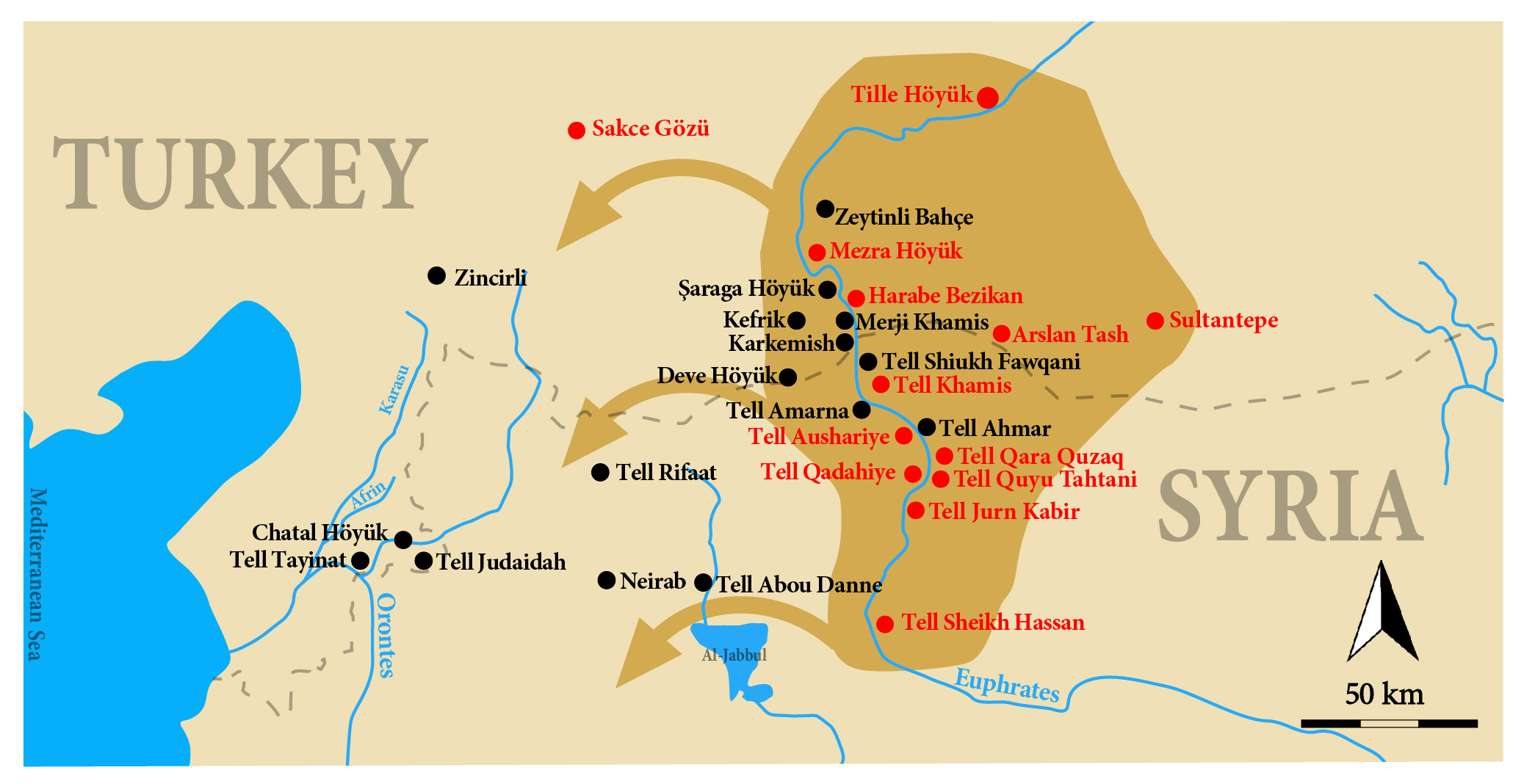
Saraga Höyük and nearby sites.

The settlement began in the Late Chalcolithic.

=== Middle Bronze Age ===
In the Middle Bronze IIA (MB IIA), Saraga Höyük reached its zenith. The site was near the major site of Carchemish in the south and Lidar Höyük nearby.

==== Pottery ====
The site hosted examples of two pottery kilns that produced pottery spread along the Euphrates River Valley. Pithos with grooved rim found along the Euphrates River from Saraga Höyük to Haradum, were produced at Saraga Höyük.

=== Late Bronze Age ===
In the Late Bronze Age, a sacral monumental structure was rebuilt there several times.

=== Iron Age ===
In the Iron Age, Euphrates Handmade Syrian Horses and Riders were made in this region.

== Bibliography ==
- Ezer, Sabahattin. (2013). Middle Bronze Age Pottery Kilns at Şaraga Höyük. Belleten. 77. 1–14. 10.37879/belleten.2013.1.
- Sertok, K. et al. (2000) Saraga Höyük 1999 Y~h Kaz~~ Sonuçlan" Il~su ve Karkant Baraj Galeri Alt~nda Kalacak Arkeolojik ve Kültür Varl~klann~~ Kurtarma Projesi 2000 rd~~ Çal~~malan. 453–486.
- Sertok, K. et al. (2005) Saraga Höyük Salvage Excavations. 26. K S. T / 2. Cilt. 281–290.
- Sertok, K. et al. (2007) Living Along and Together with the Euphrates. The Effects of the Euphrates on a Long-life Settlement such as Şaraga Höyük. Varia Anatolica XIX. 341–353.
