= Maskan =

Maskan مسكن
- Village
- Location within Iran
- Coordinates: 36°10′05″N 57°29′17″E
- Country: Iran
- Province: Razavi Khorasan
- County: Sabzevar
- Bakhsh: Central
- Rural District: Qasabeh-ye Gharbi

Population (2006)
  - Total: 232
- Time zone: UTC+3:30 (IRST)
  - Summer (DST): UTC+4:30 (IRDT)

Maskan (Persian: مسكن; also known as Mashkān) is a village in Qasabeh-ye Gharbi Rural District, in the Central District of Sabzevar County, Razavi Khorasan Province, Iran. At the 2006 census, its population was 232, in 73 families.
