= Tell Rifaat Subdistrict =

Tell Rifaat Subdistrict ناحية تل رفعت
- Subdistrict
- Location of Tell Rifaat Subdistrict within Aleppo Governorate

- Location in Syria
- Coordinates (Tell Rifaat): 36.45406°N 37.09992°E
- Country: Syria
- Governorate: Aleppo
- District: Azaz District
- Seat: Tell Rifaat

Area
  - Total: 204.52 km^{2} (78.97 sq mi)

Population (2004)
  - Total: 43,781
  - Density: 214.07/km^{2} (554.43/sq mi)
- Geocode: SY020402

Tell Rifaat Subdistrict (Arabic: ناحية تل رفعت, romanized: Nāḥiyah Tel Rif'at) is a subdistrict of Azaz District in northwestern Aleppo Governorate of northern Syria. Administrative centre is the town of Tell Rifaat.

At the 2004 census, the subdistrict had a population of 43,781. By July 2023, the population of the Tell Rifaat subdistrict was estimated to be 45,130, of whom 28,586 were IDPs from other parts of Syria.

== Cities, towns and villages ==
Cities, towns and villages of Tell Rifaat Subdistrict
PCode	Name	Population
C1621	Tell Rifaat	20,514
C1626	Kafr Naya	5,647
C1624	Shaykh Issa	4,296
C1620	Deir Jamal	4,287
C1623	Ahras	2,851
C1617	Tell Jabin	2,579
C1628	Kafr Naseh	1,433
C1618	Tellejar	858
C1619	Tanib	708
—N/a	al-Jihad	237
C1627	Masqan	222
C1622	Tatemrash	111
C1625	Kashtaar	38
