= Afrin Canton =

Canton of Rojava, Syria

Coordinates: 36.5280°N 37.9540°E

Afrin Canton Kantona Efrînê مقاطعة عفرين
- One of the two cantons of the Afrin Region
- 2017–2018
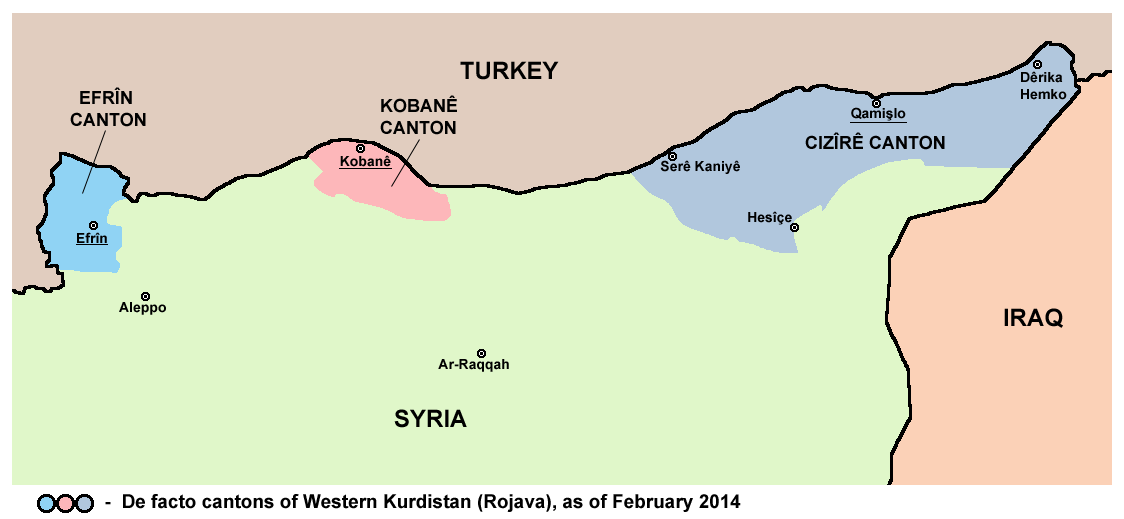
- Afrin Canton was major part of the Afrin Region (blue)
- Capital: Afrin
- Historical era: Syrian Civil War
  - Formation of the Afrin Region (then "Afrin Canton"): 2014
  - Reorganisation of the Administrative divisions of Rojava: 2017
  - Seizure of Afrin: 2018
Preceded by	Succeeded by
Afrin Region	Syrian Interim Government
- Today part of: Turkish occupation of northern Syria

The Afrin Canton (Kurdish: Kantona Efrînê; Arabic: مقاطعة عفرين; Classical Syriac: ܦܠܩܐ ܕܥܦܪܝܢ, romanized: Pelqā dha-ʻAfrin) was one of the cantons of Rojava. Syria's Afrin District fell under the control of the People's Protection Units (YPG) around 2012 and an "Afrin Canton" (later Afrin Region) was declared in 2014. Afrin Canton in its latest form was established in 2017, however, as part of the reorganisation of Rojava's subdivisions. With Afrin as its administrative centre, the canton was part of the larger Afrin Region. As a result of Operation Olive Branch in early 2018, Afrin Canton became part of the Turkish occupation of northern Syria. The government of the Afrin Region was subsequently confined to the area around Tell Rifaat.

== Demographics ==
The population of the Afrin Canton area was overwhelmingly ethnic Kurdish, to the degree that the canton had been described as "homogeneously Kurdish". The overall population of Afrin Canton, based on the 2004 Syrian census, was about 200,000.

Cities and towns with more than 10,000 inhabitants according to the 2004 Syrian census are Afrin (36,562) and Jindires (13,661).

Throughout the course of the Syrian Civil War, Afrin Canton served as a safe haven for refugees of all ethnicities, fleeing violence and destruction from civil war factions, in particular the Islamic State of Iraq and the Levant (ISIL) and the diverse more or less Islamist rebel groups of the Syrian opposition. According to a June 2016 estimate from the International Middle East Peace Research Center, about 316,000 displaced Syrians of Kurdish, Yazidi, Arab and Turkmen ethnicity lived in Afrin Canton at the time.

== History ==
According to René Dussaud, the area of Kurd-Dagh and the plain near Antioch were settled by Kurds since antiquity. According to Kurdish scholar Ismet Cheriff Vanly, there is reason to believe that Kurdish settlements in the Kurd Mountains go back to the Seleucid Empire, since those regions stood in the path to Antioch; Kurds in the early periods served as mercenaries and mounted archers. In any case, the Kurd Mountains were already Kurdish-inhabited when the Crusades broke out at the end of the 11th century.

The area around Afrin developed as the center of a distinctive Sufi "Kurdish Islam". In modern post-independence Syria, the Kurdish society of the canton was subject to heavy-handed Arabization policies by the Damascus government.

In the course of the Syrian civil war, Damascus government forces pulled back from the canton in spring 2012 to give way to the People's Protection Units (YPG) and autonomous self-government under the Autonomous Administration of North and East Syria, which was formally declared on 29 January 2014. Until 2018, violence in Afrin was minor, involving artillery shelling by Jabhat al-Nusra as well as by Turkey.

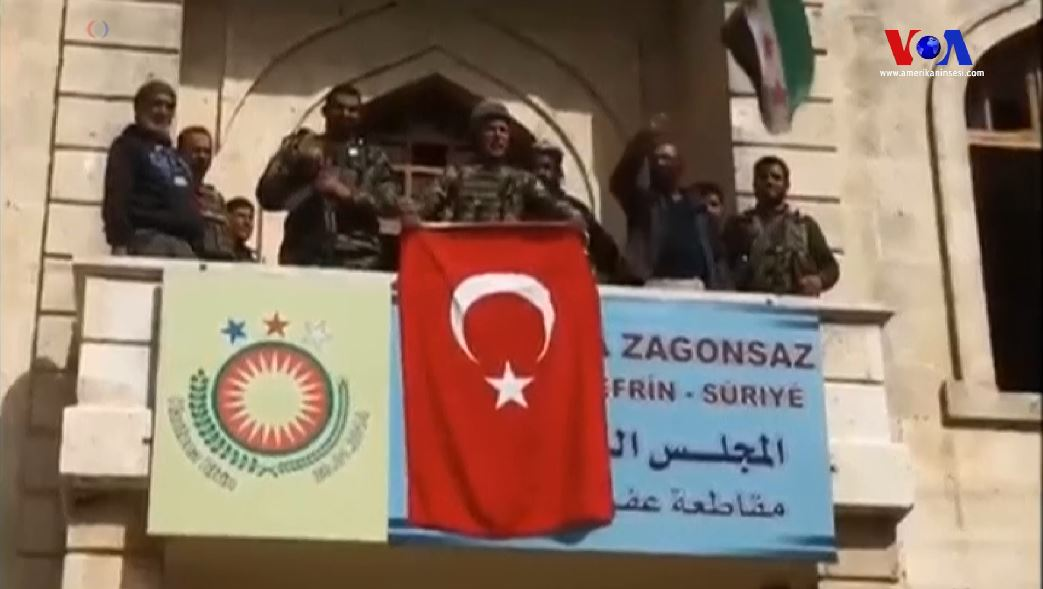
Turkish soldiers and SNA fighters at the building in Afrin that had hosted the PYD-led government of the region, 18 March 2018

Afrin Canton was captured by the Turkish Land Forces and Syrian National Army (SNA) as result of the 2018 Afrin offensive. Tens of thousands of Kurdish refugees fled from Afrin City before its capture by the SNA in March 2018, and the YPG vowed to retake it. The YPG subsequently announced its intention to start a guerrilla war in Afrin Canton, leading to the SDF insurgency in Northern Aleppo.

== Economy ==
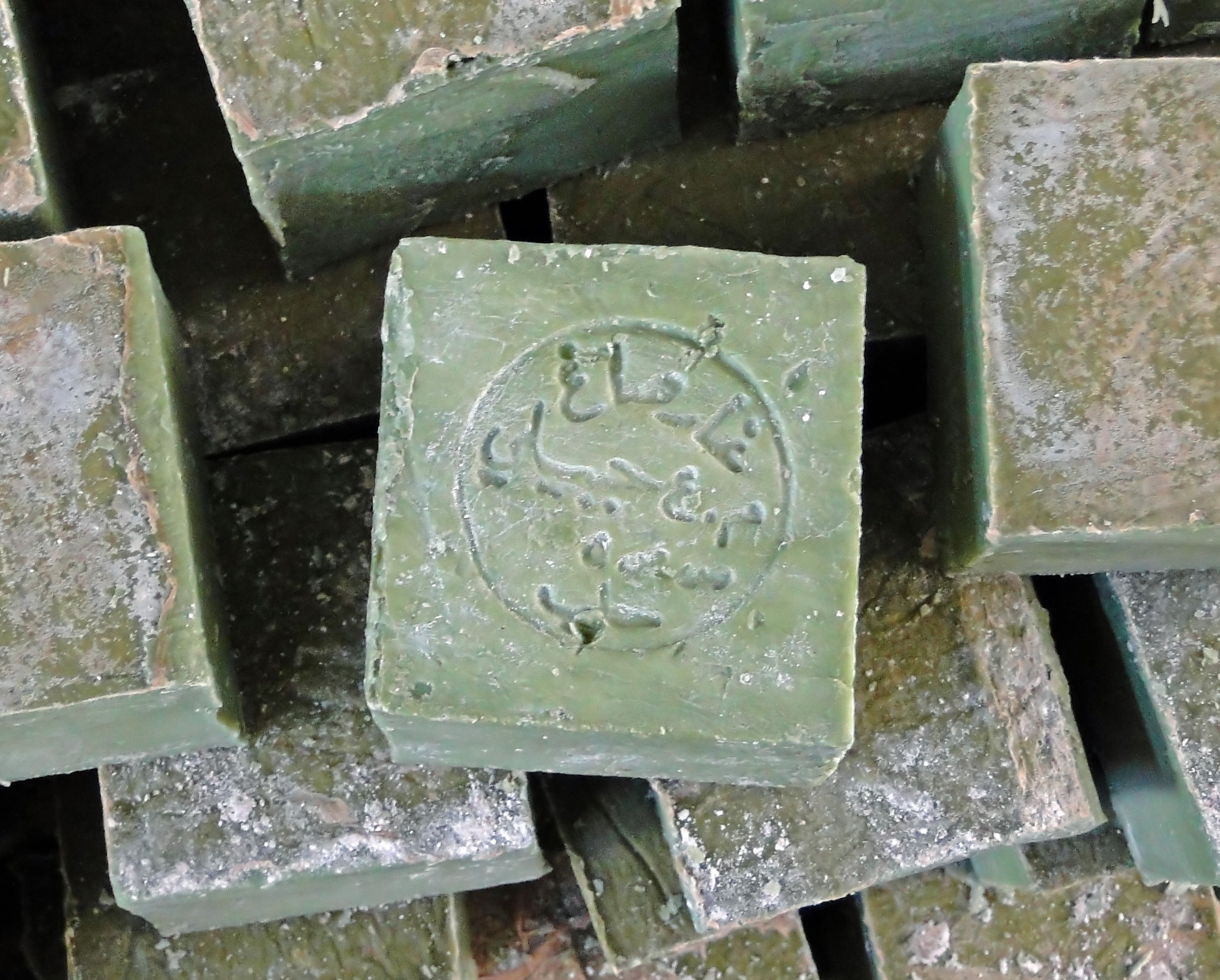
Aleppo soap

A diverse agricultural production was at the heart of the Afrin Canton's economy, traditionally olives in particular, and more recently there was a focus on increasing wheat production. A well-known product from the area is Aleppo soap, a hard soap made from olive oil and lye, distinguished by the inclusion of laurel oil. While Afrin Canton has been the source of olive oil for Aleppo soap since antiquity, the destruction caused by the Syrian Civil War to other parts of Aleppo governorate increasingly made the entire production chains locate in Afrin Canton. At the height of the fighting for Aleppo, up to 50 percent of the city's industrial production was moved to Afrin Canton. As of early 2016, two million pairs of jeans were produced per month and exported across Syria. In January 2017, 400 textile industry workshops counted 17,000 employees, supplying the whole of Syria.

Afrin Canton was under a blockade imposed by neighbouring Turkey, which placed high burdens on international import and export. For example, transportation of Aleppo soap to international markets, as far as possible at all, had at least four times the transportation cost as compared to pre-war years. In 2015 there were 32 tons of Aleppo soap produced and exported to other parts of Syria, but also to international markets.

=== Tourism ===
Afrin District also served as a center for domestic tourism due to its beautiful landscapes. Syrians continued to travel to the region for recreational purposes after the formation of Afrin Region, and later Afrin Canton. The tourism was however somewhat constricted due to the YPG's tight control of the borders, and the war; local tourism mostly collapsed during the Turkish invasion of 2018.

== Education ==
Like in the other Rojava cantons, primary education in the public schools is initially by mother tongue instruction either Kurdish or Arabic, with the aim of bilingualism in Kurdish and Arabic in secondary schooling. Curricula are a topic of continuous debate between the canton' Boards of Education and the Syrian central government in Damascus, which partly pays the teachers.

The federal, regional and local administrations in Rojava put much emphasis on promoting libraries and educational centers, to facilitate learning and social and artistic activities.

Afrin Canton had an institution of higher education, the University of Afrin, founded in 2015. After teaching three programs (Electromechanical Engineering, Kurdish Literature and Economy) in the first academic year, the second academic year with an increased 22 professors and 250 students has three additional programs (Human Medicine, Journalism and Agricultural Engineering). The university was closed after the Turkish invasion; its students were able to follow up on their studies at the Rojava University in Qamishli.

== See also ==
- Federalization of Syria
- Rojava conflict
- Rojava
- Afrin Region
- Jazira Region
