= Deir Jmal =

Deir alJmal دير الجمال
- Town
- Location of Deir alJmal in Syria
- Coordinates: 36°26′42″N 37°01′41″E
- Country: Syria
- Governorate: Aleppo
- District: Azaz
- Subdistrict: Tell Rifaat

Population (2010)
  - Total: 10,000
- Time zone: UTC+2 (EET)
  - Summer (DST): UTC+3 (EEST)
- Geocode: C1620

Deir Jmal (Arabic: دير جمال) is a town in northern Aleppo Governorate, northwestern Syria. Located north of Aleppo, it is administratively part of Nahiya Tell Rifaat in A'zaz District. Nearby localities include Tell Rifaat and Mare' to the east, A'zaz to the north, Mayer and al-Zahraa to the south. In the 2004 census, Deir Jamal had a population of 4,287.

== Syrian Civil War ==
During the Syrian Civil War, the town was fought over in several battles. After the Free Syrian Army took over the town in 2012, it was captured by the Islamic State of Iraq and the Levant in January 2014. In the summer, the Kurdish Front took the town but lost it in late 2015 to the rebels.

On the 8 February 2016, the Kurdish YPG captured Deir Jamal. On 12 March 2018, during the Afrin offensive (January–March 2018), it was handed over to the Syrian Arab Army.

On May 7 2022, a Syrian soldier was killed in the village after Turkish and SNA forces shelled the village with artillery.
