= Sheikh Issa Elashury =

Sheikh Issa Elashury الشيخ عيسى العاشوري
- Village
- Location in Syria
- Country: Syria
- Governorate: Idlib
- District: Jisr al-Shughur District
- Subdistrict: Darkush Nahiyah

Population (2004)
  - Total: 984
- Time zone: UTC+2 (EET)
  - Summer (DST): UTC+3 (EEST)
- City Qrya Pcode: C4251

Sheikh Issa Elashury (Arabic: الشيخ عيسى العاشوري) is a Syrian village located in Darkush Nahiyah in Jisr al-Shughur District, Idlib. According to the Syria Central Bureau of Statistics (CBS), Sheikh Issa Elashury had a population of 984 in the 2004 census.
