= Herbel =

Herbel حربل
- Village
- Location of Herbel in Syria
- Coordinates: 36°25′57″N 37°09′54″E
- Country: Syria
- Governorate: Aleppo
- District: Azaz
- Subdistrict: Mare'

Population (2004)
  - Total: 3,403
- Time zone: UTC+2 (EET)
  - Summer (DST): UTC+3 (EEST)
- Geocode: C1631

Herbel (Arabic: حربل, also spelled Herbil and Harbul) is a village in northern Aleppo Governorate, northwestern Syria. With a population of 3,403 as per the 2004 census. Administratively, it is part of the Nahiya Mare' in A'zaz District. Nearby localities include Tell Rifaat to the northwest, Mare' to the northeast, Maarat Umm Hawsh to the southeast and Ihras to the southwest.

== Syrian Civil War ==
During the Syrian War, Herbel was captured by the Free Syrian Army in 2012 but later conquered by the Islamic State (IS) in early 2014. It was eventually captured by the Kurdish-led Syrian Democratic Forces (SDF) during the February offensive in 2016, bringing it into the Autonomous Administration of North and East Syria. The capture of the village by the YPG halted the northwards advance by the Syrian Army during the offensive. On 11 June 2023, a Russian soldier was killed and 4 others were injured by Turkish shelling on their military vehicle near the village. This came after a day after a Turkish drone strike killed 3 YPG fighters on the same frontline. It was eventually captured by Turkey-backed militants in November 2024.
