= Fafin =

Fafin فافين
- Village
- Location of Fafin in Syria
- Coordinates: 36°20′32″N 37°14′44″E
- Country: Syria
- Governorate: Aleppo
- District: Azaz
- Subdistrict: Mare'

Population (2004)
  - Total: 3,183
- Time zone: UTC+2 (EET)
  - Summer (DST): UTC+3 (EEST)
- Geocode: C1640

Fafin (Arabic: فافين, romanized: Fāfīn) is a village in northern Aleppo Governorate, northwestern Syria. Located just 15 km (9.3 mi) north of the city of Aleppo and some 9 km (5.6 mi) south of Mare, it administratively forms part of Nahiya Mare' in A'zaz District. The village had a population of 3,183 as per the 2004 census.
