= Kafr Naya =

Kafr Naya كفر نايا
- Town
- Location in Syria
- Coordinates: 36°25′12″N 37°04′19″E
- Country: Syria
- Governorate: Aleppo
- District: Azaz
- Subdistrict: Tell Rifaat

Population (2004)
  - Total: 5,647
- Time zone: UTC+2 (EET)
  - Summer (DST): UTC+3 (EEST)
- Geocode: C1626

Kafr Naya (Arabic: كفر نايا, romanized: Kafar Naya) is a town in northern Aleppo Governorate, northwestern Syria. Located north of Aleppo, the town is administratively part of Nahiya Tell Rifaat in A'zaz District. Nearby localities include Mayer to the southwest. In the 2004 census, Kafr Naya had a population of 5,647. The village is inhabited by Turkmen.

== Syrian War ==
During the Syrian War, Kafr Naya was captured by the Free Syrian Army in 2012 but later conquered by the Islamic State (IS) in early 2014. It was eventually captured by the Kurdish-led Syrian Democratic Forces (SDF) during the February offensive in 2016, bringing it into the Autonomous Administration of North and East Syria. The capture of the town by the YPG halted the northwards advance by the Syrian Army during the offensive. The area was then captured by militants backed by Turkey in 2024.
