= Tell Rifaat =

Tell Rifaat تل رفعت
- City
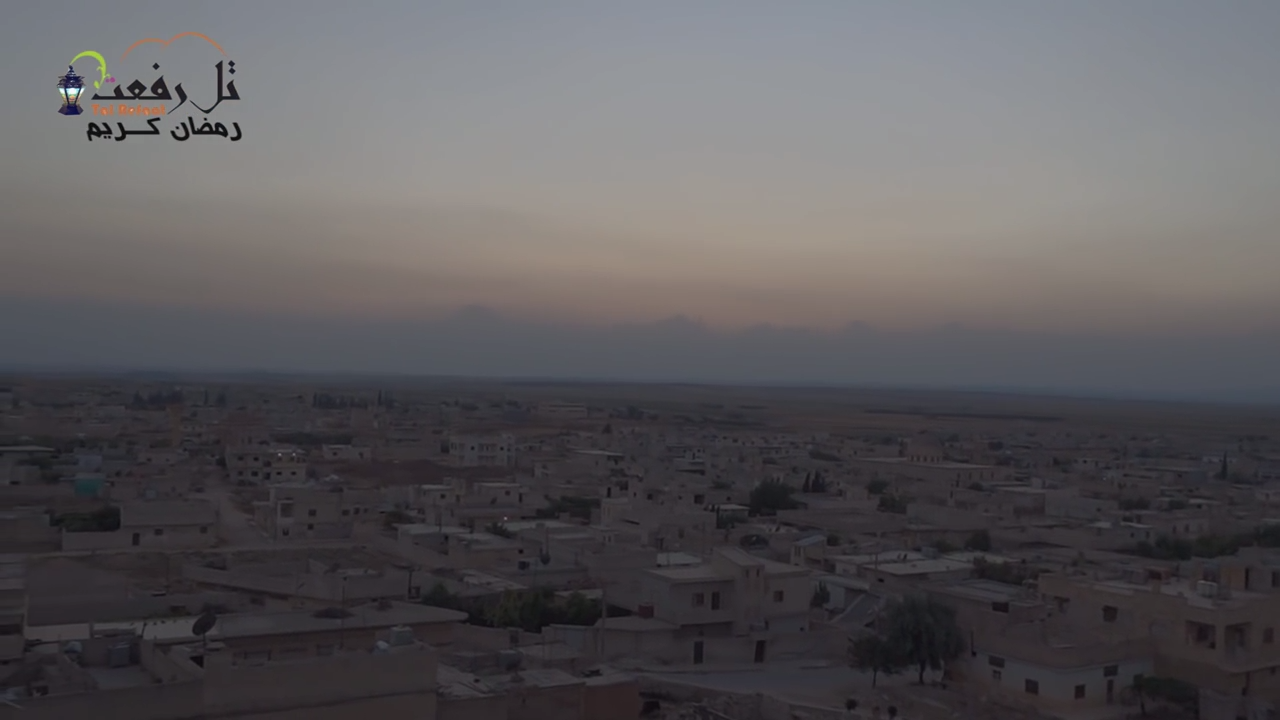
- Tell Rifaat in 2015

- Location of Tell Rifaat in Syria
- Coordinates: 36°28′24″N 37°05′50″E
- Country: Syria
- Governorate: Aleppo
- District: Azaz
- Subdistrict: Tell Rifaat
- Elevation: 457 m (1,499 ft)

Population (2004)
  - Total: 20,514
- Time zone: UTC+2 (EET)
  - Summer (DST): UTC+3 (EEST)
- Geocode: C1621

Tell Rifaat (Arabic: تل رفعت, romanized: Tall Rifʿat, also spelled Tel Rifaat, Tel Rif'at or Tal Rifaat) is a city in northern Aleppo Governorate, northwestern Syria. Located roughly 40 kilometres (25 mi) north of Aleppo, the city is the administrative center of Nahiya Tell Rifaat. Nearby localities include Azaz to the north, Mare' to the east, Kafr Naya to the south, Deir Jmal and Oqayba to the southwest and Ibbin Samaan to the west. In the 2004 census, Tell Rifaat had a population of 20,514. Its inhabitants are Arabs.

During the Syrian Civil War, Tell Rifaat was captured by the Free Syrian Army in 2012, the Islamic State of Iraq and the Levant in 2014, and the Islamic Front in 2015. During this time, the town was bombed several times by the government of Ba'athist Syria and its Russian allies. Tell Rifaat was captured by the Afrin-based Kurdish YPG on 16 February 2016 after heavy Russian air strikes which destroyed all three health facilities in the town. Following a rebel offensive against the SAA in December 2024, the town fell under control of the Azaz-based Turkish-backed rebel forces (SNA & SIG) and was not incorporated into the Syrian caretaker government until January 2025.

== History ==
=== Iron Age ===
==== Neo-Hittite Kingdom of Bit Agusi ====
Tell Rifaat has been inhabited since the Iron Age when it was known as "Arpad." It became the capital of the north Syrian Aramean state of Bit Agusi established by Gus of Yahan in the 9th-century BCE. Bit Agusi stretched from the A'zaz area in the north to the kingdom of Hamath/Luhuti in the south.

==== Urartian period ====
Arpad later became a major vassal city of the Kingdom of Urartu.

==== Assyrian period ====
In 743 BCE, during the Urartu-Assyria War, the Neo-Assyrian king Tiglath-Pileser II laid siege to Arpad following the defeat of the Urartuan army of Sarduri II at Samsat. The siege ended with the Assyrian capture of the city in 743 BCE. Afterward Arpad served a provincial capital. The remains of Arpad's walls are still preserved in Tell Rifaat to the height of 8 meters.

=== Classical Age ===
A settlement existed on the modern-day site of Tell Rifaat during the Seleucid period (301 BCE-63 BCE). A hoard of coins from this period was discovered in 1967. After the nearby Tell Aran, Tell Rifaat is the largest tell in the Jabal Semʻān region.

=== Modern Age ===
==== Syrian civil war ====
For a period of about seven months in 2012, Tell Rifaat was besieged by Syrian security forces. During the siege, residents were unable to receive food supplies, including bread, from Aleppo.

In the early summer of 2012, Syrian government authorities withdrew from Tell Rifaat following fighting with the Free Syrian Army (FSA). Following this, government authorities in the town were replaced by a council made up of local Islamic scholars, judges and former Syrian Army officers, ruling in the basis of Sharia. Since its capture by the FSA, opposition rebels have been transporting flour for bread from Turkey to Tell Rifaat.

On 8 August 2012, Tell Rifaat was bombed by the Syrian Air Force, resulting in the deaths of 6 people, all members of the Blaw family. Opposition activists based in Aleppo claimed that Syrian Army forces were attempting to cut off the FSA's transport route between Tell Rifaat and Aleppo.

By November 2013, the town came under control of the Islamic State of Iraq and the Levant (ISIL) after they ousted the local Al-Tawhid Brigade. In January 2014, ISIL forces withdrew from the northern Aleppo area, and rebel fighters, mainly members of the Al-Nusra Front and Islamic Front, defeated ISIL militants in the town. The Conquest Brigade of the Islamic Front came into control of the town.

By January 2015, Tell Rifaat was under the control of the Conquest Brigade of the Islamic Front.

On 15 February 2016, the town was captured by the Kurdish YPG and the Syrian Democratic Forces, led by the Army of Revolutionaries. Russian airstrikes, which preceded the SDF assault, forced the majority of the population to escape towards rebel-controlled territories or across the border north into Turkey. Since the SDF capture of Tell Rifaat, the town became the headquarters of the Army of Revolutionaries. After the Turkish Army and allied rebel groups captured Afrin during Operation Olive Branch, displaced residents of Tel Rifaat rallied in Azaz to demand the expulsion of the SDF from the town. At the end of March 2018, the Syrian Republican Guard and the Russian Armed Forces entered the town.

On 2 December 2019 a Turkish artillery attack killed eight children, all under 15 years old, on their walk to school.

On 1 December 2024, the Azaz-based Turkish-backed Syrian National Army took control of Tell Rifaat and its surrounding villages in Operation Dawn of Freedom.

In February 2025, according to some sources, residents returning to Tel Rifaat, Syria, after displacement since 2016, confronted extensive devastation. The town, previously controlled by Kurdish forces and later seized by Turkish-backed rebels, is now characterized by widespread ruins and a complex network of underground military tunnels. These tunnels, constructed beneath homes and public buildings, have compromised structural integrity, complicating reconstruction efforts. Returning families find their homes stripped of essentials like wiring and plumbing. A concrete wall, once a military barrier, now obstructs access to farmland. Despite poor infrastructure, the resilient residents of Tel Rifaat are diligently clearing debris and striving to rebuild their lives.

== See also ==
- Euphrates Syrian Pillar Figurines
- Euphrates Handmade Syrian Horses and Riders

== Bibliography ==
- Healy, Mark (1992). The Ancient Assyrians. Osprey Publishing. ISBN 1855321637.
- Grainger, John D. (1997). A Seleukid Prosopography and Gazetteer. BRILL. ISBN 9004107991. Archived from the original on 2022-04-07.
- Kipfer, Barbara Ann (2000). Encyclopedic Dictionary of Archaeology. Springer. ISBN 0306461587.
- Lipinsky, Edward (2000). The Aramaeans: Their Ancient History, Culture, Religion. Peeters Publishers. ISBN 9042908599.
