= Zayzafun =

al-Zayzafun الزيزفون
- Village
- Location of al-Zayzafun in Syria
- Coordinates: 36°38′59″N 37°10′51″E
- Country: Syria
- Governorate: Aleppo
- District: Azaz
- Subdistrict: Sawran
- Elevation: 510 m (1,670 ft)

Population (2004)
  - Total: 820
- Time zone: UTC+2 (EET)
  - Summer (DST): UTC+3 (EEST)
- Geocode: C1658

Zayzafun (Arabic: الزيزفون, romanized: Zayzafūn), also known as Ikadah (Arabic: ايكدة, romanized: Īkidah; Turkish: İğde), is a village in the northern Aleppo countryside, Aleppo Governorate, northwestern Syria. Located on the Queiq Plain, between Azaz and Al-Rai, the village is some 45 kilometres (28 mi) north of the city of Aleppo, and just 1 km (0.62 mi) south of the border with the Turkish Province of Kilis.

Administratively the village belongs to Nahiya Sawran in Azaz District. Nearby localities include Kafr Ghan 2 km (1.2 mi) to the south and Hawar Kilis 3 km (1.9 mi) to the east. In the 2004 census, Zayzafun had a population of 820.

== History ==
In the Syrian civil war, the Ikadah IDP Camp, located 1 km (0.62 mi) north of the village at the border to Turkey, offered shelter to internally displaced persons (IDPs), mostly from the subdistricts of Azaz, Nubl, Tell Rifaat and Mare'. In April 2016, the Ikadah camp was filled with 7,763 IDPs, when an imminent ISIL counter-offensive prompted a complete evacuation of the Ikadah camp and neighboring camps near Shamarin and Harjala. On April 14, rebels retreated from Zayzafun and the neighboring villages down to Kafr Ghan and Baraghida, leaving the remaining rebel forces around Dudyan surrounded by ISIL.

== Demographics ==
Ikadah is a Turkmen village. In late 19th century, traveler Martin Hartmann noted the village as a Turkish village of 10 houses, then located in the Ottoman nahiyah of Azaz-i Turkman.
