= Az-Zahiriyah, Aleppo Governorate =

az-Zahiriyah الظاهرية
- Village
- Location of az-Zahiriyah in Syria
- Coordinates: 36°34′51″N 37°13′52″E
- Country: Syria
- Governorate: Aleppo
- District: Azaz
- Subdistrict: Sawran
- Elevation: 453 m (1,486 ft)

Population (2004)
  - Total: 194
- Time zone: UTC+2 (EET)
  - Summer (DST): UTC+3 (EEST)
- Geocode: C1666

az-Zahiriyah (Arabic: الظاهرية, romanized: aẓ-Ẓāhirīyah) is a village in northern Aleppo Governorate, northwestern Syria. It is located halfway between Azaz and Akhtarin, on the Queiq Plain, some 40 kilometres (25 mi) north of the city of Aleppo, and 10 km (6.2 mi) south of the border with the Turkish province of Kilis.

The village administratively belongs to Nahiya Sawran in Azaz District. Nearby localities include Sawran 2 km (1.2 mi) to the southwest and Ihtaimlat 3 km (1.9 mi) to the southeast. In the 2004 census, az-Zahiriyah had a population of 194.
