= Kafr Khasher =

Kafr Khasher كفر خاشر
- Village
- Location of Kafr Khasher in Syria
- Coordinates: 36°32′56″N 37°03′54″E
- Country: Syria
- Governorate: Aleppo
- District: Azaz
- Subdistrict: Azaz

Population (2004)
  - Total: 246
- Time zone: UTC+2 (EET)
  - Summer (DST): UTC+3 (EEST)
- Geocode: C1567

Kafr Khasher (Arabic: كفر خاشر) is a village in northern Aleppo Governorate, northwestern Syria. It is located on the Queiq Plain, 4 kilometres (2.5 mi) south of Azaz, and some 35 km (22 mi) north of the city of Aleppo. The Baghdad Railway passes by.

The village administratively belongs to Nahiya Azaz in Azaz District. Nearby localities include Kafr Kalbin 2 km (1.2 mi) to the east, and Menagh 3 km (1.9 mi) to the southwest. In the 2004 census, Kafr Khasher had a population of 246.
