= Al-Krum, Azaz =

Al-Krum الكروم
- Village
- Location of Al-Krum in Syria
- Coordinates: 36°39′05″N 37°02′45″E
- Country: Syria
- Governorate: Aleppo
- District: Azaz
- Subdistrict: Azaz

Population (2004)
  - Total: 252
- Time zone: UTC+2 (EET)
  - Summer (DST): UTC+3 (EEST)
- Geocode: C1565

Al-Krum (Arabic: الكروم), formerly Yazibagh, (Turkish: Yazıbağ) is a village in northern Aleppo Governorate, northwestern Syria. It is located on the northern side Mount Barsa, 7 kilometres (4.3 mi) north of Azaz, 45 km (28 mi) north of the city of Aleppo, and less than 0.5 km (0.31 mi) south of the border to the Turkish province of Kilis.

The village administratively belongs to Nahiya Azaz in Azaz District. Nearby localities include Ma'arin at the opposite side of Mount Barsa, 4 km (2.5 mi) to the south, and al-Salameh 5 km (3.1 mi) to the southeast.

== Demographics ==
In the 2004 census, Al-Krum had a population of 252.

The village has a mixed community of Turkmens, Arabs, and Kurds. In late 19th century, German traveler Martin Hartmann noted Yazibagh as a mixed Turkish and Kurdish village, then located in the Ottoman nahiyah of Azaz-i Turkman.
