= Naddah =

Syrian village

Naddah ندة
- Village
- Location of Naddah in Syria
- Coordinates: 36°35′03″N 37°05′20″E
- Country: Syria
- Governorate: Aleppo
- District: Azaz
- Subdistrict: Azaz

Population (2004)
  - Total: 305
- Time zone: UTC+3 (AST)
- Geocode: C1572

Naddah (Arabic: ندة) is a village in northern Aleppo Governorate, northwestern Syria. It is located 3 kilometres (1.9 mi) east of Azaz on the Queiq Plain, 40 km (25 mi) north of the city of Aleppo, and 6 km (3.7 mi) south of the border with the Turkish province of Kilis.

The village administratively belongs to Nahiya Azaz in Azaz District. Nearby localities include Nayarah 3 km (1.9 mi) to the northeast, and Yahmul 4 km (2.5 mi) to the east. In the 2004 census, Naddah had a population of 305.
