= Al-Fayruziyah =

al-Fayruziyah الفيرزية
- Village
- Location of al-Fayruziyah in Syria
- Coordinates: 36°35′49″N 37°08′43″E
- Country: Syria
- Governorate: Aleppo
- District: Azaz
- Subdistrict: Azaz

Population (2004)
  - Total: 88
- Time zone: UTC+2 (EET)
  - Summer (DST): UTC+3 (EEST)
- Geocode: C1560

al-Fayruziyah (Arabic: الفيرزية) is a small village in northern Aleppo Governorate, northwestern Syria. It is located on the Queiq Plain, 9 kilometres (5.6 mi) east of Azaz, 40 km (25 mi) north of the city of Aleppo, and 8 km (5.0 mi) south of the border to the Turkish province of Kilis.

The village administratively belongs to Nahiya Azaz in Azaz District. Nearby localities include Nayarah 3 km (1.9 mi) to the west, and Yahmul 2 km (1.2 mi) to the south. In the 2004 census, al-Fayruziyah had a population of 88.
