= Shuwayrin =

Shuwayrin شويرين
- Village
- Location of Shuwayrin in Syria
- Coordinates: 36°34′57″N 37°17′35″E
- Country: Syria
- Governorate: Aleppo
- District: Azaz
- Subdistrict: Sawran
- Elevation: 465 m (1,526 ft)

Population (2004)
  - Total: 695
- Time zone: UTC+2 (EET)
  - Summer (DST): UTC+3 (EEST)
- Geocode: C1660

Shuwayrin (Arabic: شويرين, romanized: Shwīrīn; Turkish: Şiferin), alternatively spelled Shweirin or Shurin, is a village in northern Aleppo Governorate, northwestern Syria. Located halfway between Azaz and al-Rai, some 40 kilometres (25 mi) north of the city of Aleppo and 9 km (5.6 mi) south of the border with the Turkish province of Kilis, the village administratively belongs to Nahiya Sawran in Azaz District. Nearby localities include Rael 2 km (1.2 mi) to the northwest and Duwaybiq 3 km (1.9 mi) to the southwest.

== Demographics ==
In the 2004 census, Shuwayrin had a population of 695. The village is inhabited by Turkmen. In late 19th century, traveler Martin Hartmann noted Shuwayrin as a Turkish village of 20 houses, then located in the Ottoman nahiyah of Azaz-i Turkman.
