= Kafra, Syria =

Kafra كفرة
- Town
- Location of Kafra in Syria
- Coordinates: 36°34′00″N 37°09′46″E
- Country: Syria
- Governorate: Aleppo
- District: Azaz
- Subdistrict: Sawran
- Elevation: 491 m (1,611 ft)

Population (2004)
  - Total: 2,859
- Time zone: UTC+2 (EET)
  - Summer (DST): UTC+3 (EEST)
- Geocode: C1672

Kafra (Arabic: كفرة, romanized: Kafrah) is a small town in northern Aleppo Governorate, northwestern Syria. Located some 35 kilometres (22 mi) north of the city of Aleppo and 10 km (6.2 mi) east of Azaz, it administratively belongs to Nahiya Sawran in Azaz District. Nearby localities include Jarez 2 km (1.2 mi) to the west, Kaljibrin 5 km (3.1 mi) to the southwest, and Sawran 3 km (1.9 mi) to the east. In the 2004 census, Kafra had a population of 2,859.

== Syrian Civil War ==
During the Syrian Civil War Kafra proved a strategic location, due to its proximity to the city of Azaz in the west, and towns of Suran and Ihtaymilat in the east. ISIL forces took Kafra on 2 December 2015 in a planned offensive on Azaz, which was under the control of FSA forces. However, this offensive never materialised as SDF forces captured the vital dam at Tishrin in the Aleppo Governorate, thereby jeopardising ISIL's control of the city of Manbij. Despite their forces in the area becoming increasingly stretched, ISIL made numerous assaults on the FSA frontlines in front of Kafra. Although this resulted in the frontline changing numerous times over the next several months, ISIL gains always proved temporary, and Kafra would quickly return to its position as a frontline town. In a major offensive by FSA forces, Kafra, along with numerous other towns, were captured by FSA forces on 10 October 2016. A large scale mining operation by ISIL forces prior to this offensive hampered FSA progress in the area. ISIL forces ultimately were forced to withdraw from much of the Aleppo Governorate, retreating towards Al-Bab.
