= Timeline of the Syrian civil war (January–April 2016) =

The following is a timeline of the Syrian Civil War from January to April 2016. Information about aggregated casualty counts is found at Casualties of the Syrian Civil War.

== January 2016 ==
=== 4 January ===
After days of clashes with the Free Syrian Army and Islamic Front Forces the Syrian Army seize 55-60% of Sheikh Miskeen at the Daraa Governorate.

Free Syrian Army groups supported the Saudi decision to sever diplomatic ties with Iran.

=== 6 January ===
Abu Rateb al-Homsy, leader of Ahrar al-Sham rebel group in Homs is assassinated by unknown gunmen in the village of Farhaniyeh.

=== 7 January ===
Pro Government National Defence Forces (Syria) captures the desert village of Al-Bayarat in the northwestern countryside of Palmyra from Islamic State of Iraq and the Levant. There were also clashes between the two parties near the small village of Al-Dawa. On the same day, People's Protection Units fought Islamic State (IS) militants, defending Ain Issa, Sarrin, and Tishrin Dam which was seized from IS in December 2015.

=== 11 January ===
A United Nations-led aid convoy enters the besieged town of Madaya to deliver food and medical aid to 40,000 people. Aid also reaches the villages of Al-Fu'ah and Kafriya, under siege by rebel forces in the Idlib Governorate.

=== 12 January ===
Syrian Armed forces take control of the rebel Bastion of Salma in the Latakia Governorate
According to Putin, Assad may have an asylum from Russia.

=== 17 January ===
Syrian Rebels declare full control of Dudyan, Yani Yaban, Baraghida, al-Yaaroubiyah villages in Northeastern Aleppo, which they took from ISIS

The Islamic State of Iraq and the Levant abducts over 400 civilians from Al-Baghaliyeh suburb in the eastern Syrian city of Deir Ezzor, after clashes with Syrian Army forces and their allies that left over 150 combatants killed.

=== 24 January ===
A ballistic missile struck an Al-Nusra Front run police station in Idlib killing 11 Islamist Fighters and 5 civilians.

=== 25 January ===
Syrian Army units and its allies capture the southern rebel bastion of Shaykh Maskin cutting off rebels supplies towards Daara.

=== 31 January ===
71 people were killed in suicide bomb blast in Damascus that was established by terrorist organization ISIS.

== February 2016 ==
=== 1 February ===
The Syrian Army announces the beginning of the 3rd Phase of the Lattakia Offensive with the aim of sealing the Northeastern Corner of the Latakia Governorate and create a frontline at the rebel city of Jisr Al-Shughour.

=== 3 February ===
The Syrian Army has broken the Siege of Nubl and Al-Zahraa in the northern Aleppo Governorate, linking with the defenders of Nubl at village of Mu’arrassat al-Khan after a 3-days battle.

=== 4 February ===
A top Saudi defence chief said Saudi Arabia is ready to send ground troops to Syria if the United States accepts it. The United Arab Emirates announced its intentions to deploy ground forces in Syria according to Minister of State for Foreign Affairs Anwar Gargash, however it added that United States lead was a prerequisite for the UAE.

=== 7 February ===
The Syrian Foreign Minister warned against a foreign ground intervention; saying that any foreign army troops entering Syria without government consent would "return home in wooden coffins", Syria's Foreign Minister Walid al-Muallem said, in reference to Saudi Arabia no made in the past two days.

Bassam al-Kuwaiti, a political Syrian Opposition figure told Voice of America that Moderate Opposition face a wipe out in Northern Aleppo as the Russian backed Syrian offensive continues. Free Syrian Army forces are already relying on Ahrar al-Sham and Al-Qaeda linked al-Nusra, being merge and disband their last option.

=== 8 February ===
Former MI6 agent Alastair Crooke, warns about an imminent Syrian Army encircling of Aleppo Jihadists Groups, inside a cauldron at Northern Aleppo.

=== 12 February ===
Three U.S. backed Shite militias are now working with Pro-Syrian Army forces fighting other U.S Backed rebels in Southern Aleppo, according to two United States defense officials.

=== 13 February ===
Turkey shells YPG positions in northern Aleppo.

=== 15 February ===
A Russian air strike has destroyed a compound in northern Syria with least seven people dead and more than ten people missing presumed to be dead.

Turkish Prime Minister Ahmet Davutoğlu accuses Russia of acting as a "terrorist organization" in Syria, saying "If Russia continues behaving like a terrorist organization and forcing civilians to flee, we will deliver an extremely decisive response".

=== 17 February ===
Al-Arabiyah reports of Turkish officials discomfort with the United States regarding its stance with the Kurds.

=== 18 February ===
Adel al-Jubeir, the Minister of Foreign Affairs of the Kingdom of Saudi Arabia, announced that a US-led ground operation in Syria would focus on fighting ISIS, not the Syrian regime.

=== 21 February ===
At least 46 people were killed and several injured in a double car bombs explosion in the city of Homs. At least 30 people were killed in several bomb blasts near Damascus. Both incidents were masterminded by ISIS.

The Syrian Arab Army and pro-government forces have encircled and overrun the Al-Safira plains between Aleppo and Kuweires Military Airbase. 20 villages were seized over the previous 24 hours and 40 kilometers of highway were cleared. In addition, 50 ISIS fighters were killed in the past 24 hours.

=== 22 February ===
United States and Russia agree an all party ceasefire that will exclude the ISIS and the al-Qaeda-linked Nusra Front begin on 27 February.

Jund al-Aqsa and the Free Syrian Army captured the village of Rasm al-Nafal, to the southwest of Lake Jabbul, severing the Ithriyah-Khanasser Highway again for the second time in 5 months. In a coordinated action, ISIL had also captured multiple villages along the southern shore of Lake Jabbul and to the south of Rasm al-Nafal, sealing off more of the Aleppo road and Sheikh Hilal-Ithriyah Road. Counter-attacks by Syrian Arab Army have failed to immediately dislodge militants from the majority of the captured positions.

=== 25 February ===
In the aftermath of the combined rebel and ISIL breakthrough south of Lake Jabbul, the Syrian Army launched a large-scale counter-attack, dislodging ISIL from the town of Khanasir which they had captured 2 days before.

=== 27 February ===
The United Nations Security Council unanimously adopted a resolution that demanded all parties to comply with the terms of a U.S.-Russian deal on a "cessation of hostilities".

=== 28 February ===
Saudi Arabia accuses Russia and Syria of ceasefire violations.

=== 29 February ===
Russian and U.S brokered ceasefire takes places despite accusations by parties involved. France wants answers on ceasefire violations.

The Syrian Arab Army has re-opened a supply route to Aleppo city, completing a 2016 Khanasir offensive against ISIL.

== March 2016 ==
=== 2 March ===
A car bomb killed at least 18 members of the Syria Revolutionaries Front including its leader Muhammad al-Qairi, also known as Abu Hamza al-Naimi in southern Syria. The attack was likely carried out by ISIS sleeper cells.

=== 4 March ===
Two Syrian air strikes hit the town of Douma in Eastern Ghouta, leaving one person killed; it is unknown if the dead was a civilian or a rebel fighter. Over 118 people have been killed during the 5 day long ceasefire areas including 24 civilians. Meanwhile, in non truce areas the dead ascended to 552, mostly in clashes against the Islamic State.

=== 12 March ===
Syrian rebels reported that they have shot down a warplane near Hama. The Al Qaeda-linked Nusra Front seized the bases and weapons of a Western-backed rebel group in overnight fighting in northwestern Syria. Syria’s foreign minister, Walid al-Muallem said that peace talks will fail if any party tries to discuss the presidency in a transition government, calling the incumbent president, Bashar al-Assad, a “red line”.

=== 15 March ===
Russia started a partial withdrawal of troops from Syria, however air strikes will continue.

=== 24 March ===
Syrian government forces retake Palmyra, with the assistance of Russian airstrikes, after losing it to ISIL in May 2015.

== April 2016 ==
=== 2 April ===
al-Qaeda linked Nusra Front and other Syrian rebels attack Syrian government forces, and take a strategic hill from them.

=== 4 April ===
Syrian government forces seize the town of al-Qaryatain from the Islamic State.

Turkish authorities imprisons the Turkmen fighter who was filmed killing the pilot in the 2015 Russian Sukhoi Su-24 shootdown .

=== 5 April ===
The Syrian affiliate of al-Qaeda, the al-Nusra Front, shoot down and capture a pilot of the Syrian Arab Air Force near Aleppo.

=== 6 April ===
“Abu Saqqqar” a Syrian rebel that appeared on 2013 in a video trying to eat the heart of a dead Syrian soldier, is killed in the countryside of Idlib.

=== 15 April ===
At least 210 combatants are killed in Syria Aleppo during a week of fighting; 82 government troops, 94 rebels and 34 Islamic State jihadists according to the Syrian Observatory of Human Rights
