= Bel, Syria =

Bel البل
- Village
- Location of Bel in Syria
- Coordinates: 36°35′41″N 37°11′21″E
- Country: Syria
- Governorate: Aleppo
- District: Azaz
- Subdistrict: Sawran
- Elevation: 472 m (1,549 ft)

Population (2004)
  - Total: 563
- Time zone: UTC+2 (EET)
  - Summer (DST): UTC+3 (EEST)
- Geocode: C1669

Bel (Arabic: البل, romanized: al-Bil) is a village in northern Aleppo Governorate, northwestern Syria. Located halfway between Azaz and al-Rai, some 40 kilometres (25 mi) north of the city of Aleppo and 7 km (4.3 mi) south of the border to the Turkish province of Kilis, the village administratively belongs to Nahiya Sawran in Azaz District. Nearby localities include Sawran 4 km (2.5 mi) to the southeast and Kafr Ghan 4 km (2.5 mi) to the north.

== Demographics ==
In the 2004 census, Bel had a population of 563. The village is inhabited by Turkmen. In late 19th century, traveler Martin Hartmann noted Bel as a Turkish village of 15 houses, then located in the Ottoman nahiyah of Azaz-i Turkman.
