= Al-Yaarubiyah, Azaz =

al-Yaarubiyah اليعربية
- Village
- Location of al-Yaarubiyah in Syria
- Coordinates: 36°38′48″N 37°14′13″E
- Country: Syria
- Governorate: Aleppo
- District: Azaz
- Subdistrict: Sawran
- Elevation: 507 m (1,663 ft)

Population (2004)
  - Total: 552
- Time zone: UTC+2 (EET)
  - Summer (DST): UTC+3 (EEST)
- Geocode: C1657

al-Yaarubiyah (Arabic: اليعربية, romanized: al-Ya'rubīyah), also known as Daliha (Arabic: دلحة, romanized: Dalḩah), is a village in northern Aleppo Governorate, northwestern Syria. Located halfway between Azaz and al-Rai, approximately 45 kilometres (28 mi) north of the city of Aleppo and 3 km (1.9 mi) south of the border to the Turkish province of Kilis, the village administratively belongs to Nahiya Sawran in Azaz District. Nearby localities include Baraghida 3 km (1.9 mi) to the southwest and Dudiyan 5 km (3.1 mi) to the southeast.

== Demographics ==
In the 2004 census, al-Yaarubiyah had a population of 552. The village is inhabited by Turkmen. In late 19th century, traveler Martin Hartmann noted Daliha as a Turkish and Arab (Bedouin) plural village of 10 houses, then located in the Ottoman nahiyah of Azaz-i Turkman.
