= Kafr Burayshah =

Kafr Burayshah كفر بارجة
- Village
- Location of Kafr Burayshah in Syria
- Coordinates: 36°37′43″N 37°08′51″E
- Country: Syria
- Governorate: Aleppo
- District: Azaz
- Subdistrict: Sawran
- Elevation: 493 m (1,617 ft)

Population (2004)
  - Total: 126
- Time zone: UTC+2 (EET)
  - Summer (DST): UTC+3 (EEST)
- Geocode: C1671

Kafr Burayshah (Arabic: كفر بارجة), also referred to as Kafr Barja or Kefer Parcha, is a village in northern Aleppo Governorate, northwestern Syria. It is located on the Queiq Plain, 10 kilometres (6.2 mi) northeast of Azaz, 45 km (28 mi) north of the city of Aleppo, and 3 km (1.9 mi) south of the border with the Turkish province of Kilis.

The village administratively belongs to Nahiya Sawran in Azaz District. Nearby localities include Nayarah 4 km (2.5 mi) to the southwest and Shamarikh 3 km (1.9 mi) to the northwest.

== Demographics ==
In the 2004 census, Kafr Burayshah had a population of 126. In late 19th century, traveler Martin Hartmann noted Kafar Parcha as a Turkish and Arab (Bedouin) mixed village, then located in the Ottoman nahiyah of Azaz-i Turkman, composed of 10 households.
