= Al-Malikiyah, Azaz =

Village in Aleppo, Syria

al-Malikiyah المالكية
- Village
- Location of al-Malikiyah in Syria
- Coordinates: 36°32′34″N 36°59′31″E
- Country: Syria
- Governorate: Aleppo
- District: Azaz
- Subdistrict: Azaz

Population (2004)
  - Total: 177
- Time zone: UTC+2 (EET)
  - Summer (DST): UTC+3 (EEST)
- Geocode: C1563

al-Malikiyah (Arabic: المالكية) is a village in northern Aleppo Governorate, northwestern Syria. It is located on the foot of Şewarxa mountain, 2 kilometres (1.2 mi) southwest of Azaz, 40 km (25 mi) north of the city of Aleppo.

The village administratively belongs to Nahiya Azaz in Azaz District. Nearby localities include Maraanaz 2 km (1.2 mi) to the east, on the western edge of the Queiq Plain, and Maryamin 4 km (2.5 mi) further to the west. In the 2004 census, al-Malikiyah had a population of 177.
