= Kafr Shoush =

Kafr Shoush كفر شوش
- Village
- Location in Syria
- Coordinates: 36°38′03″N 37°10′01″E
- Country: Syria
- Governorate: Aleppo
- District: Azaz
- Subdistrict: Sawran
- Elevation: 500 m (1,600 ft)

Population (2004)
  - Total: 95
- Time zone: UTC+2 (EET)
  - Summer (DST): UTC+3 (EEST)
- Geocode: C1673

Kafr Shoush (Arabic: كفرشوش, romanized: Kafr Shūsh; Turkish: Kefer Şuş or Kefer Çüş) is a village in northern Aleppo Governorate, northwestern Syria. It is located between Azaz and Al-Rai on the Queiq Plain, some 45 kilometres (28 mi) north of the city of Aleppo, and 2 km (1.2 mi) south of the border with the Turkish province of Kilis.

The village administratively belongs to Nahiya Sawran in Azaz District. Nearby localities include Kafr Ghan 2 km (1.2 mi) to the east and Kafr Burayshah 2 km (1.2 mi) to the west. In the 2004 census, Kafr Shoush had a population of 95. The village is inhabited by Turkmen. Traveler Martin Hartmann noted the village as a Turkish village of 10 houses in late 19th century.
