= Yahmul =

Yahmul يحمول
- Village
- Location of Yahmul in Syria
- Coordinates: 36°34′57″N 37°07′56″E
- Country: Syria
- Governorate: Aleppo
- District: Azaz
- Subdistrict: Azaz

Population (2004)
  - Total: 612
- Time zone: UTC+2 (EET)
  - Summer (DST): UTC+3 (EEST)
- Geocode: C1571

Yahmul (Arabic: يحمول) is a village in northern Aleppo Governorate, northwestern Syria. It is located halfway between Azaz and Sawran on the Queiq Plain, 40 km (25 mi) north of the city of Aleppo, and 9 km (5.6 mi) south of the border with the Turkish province of Kilis. Traveler Martin Hartmann noted the village as a Turkish village in late 19th century.

The village administratively belongs to Nahiya Azaz in Azaz District. Nearby localities include Nayarah 3.5 km (2.2 mi) to the northwest, and Jarez 2 km (1.2 mi) to the southeast. In the 2004 census, Yahmul had a population of 612.
