= Sijaraz =

Sijraz سيجراز
- Village
- Location of Sijraz in Syria
- Coordinates: 36°34′27″N 37°00′49″E
- Country: Syria
- Governorate: Aleppo
- District: Azaz
- Subdistrict: Azaz

Population (2004)
  - Total: 735
- Time zone: UTC+2 (EET)
  - Summer (DST): UTC+3 (EEST)
- Geocode: C1556

Sijraz (Arabic: سيجراز) is a village in northern Aleppo Governorate, northwestern Syria. It is located on the western edge of the Queiq Plain, 2 kilometres (1.2 mi) southwest of Azaz, 40 km (25 mi) north of the city of Aleppo. The Baghdad Railway passes by.

The village administratively belongs to Nahiya Azaz in Azaz District. Nearby localities include Maraanaz 3 km (1.9 mi) to the south, and Qatma 4 km (2.5 mi) further to the west, in the Kurd-Dagh mountains. In the 2004 census, Sijraz had a population of 735.
