= Al-Judaydah, Aleppo Governorate =

al-Judaydah الجديدة
- Village
- Location in Syria
- Coordinates: 36°37′02″N 37°15′59″E
- Country: Syria
- Governorate: Aleppo
- District: Azaz
- Subdistrict: Sawran

Population (2004)
  - Total: 63
- Time zone: UTC+2 (EET)
  - Summer (DST): UTC+3 (EEST)
- Geocode: C1662

Al-Judaydah (Arabic: الجديدة, romanized: al-Jadīdat), formerly Yeniyapan, is a village in northern Aleppo Governorate, northwestern Syria. Located halfway between Azaz and al-Rai, some 45 kilometres (28 mi) north of the city of Aleppo and 5 km (3.1 mi) south of the border to the Turkish province of Kilis, the village administratively belongs to Nahiya Sawran in Azaz District. Nearby localities include Dudiyan 3 km (1.9 mi) to the northeast and Murayghil 2 km (1.2 mi) to the south.

== Demographics ==
In the 2004 census, al-Judaydah had a population of 63. The village is inhabited by Turkmen. In late 19th century, traveler Martin Hartmann noted al-Judaydah as a Turkish and Arab (Bedouin) mixed village of 7 houses, then located in the Ottoman nahiyah of Azaz-i Turkman.
