= Murayghil =

Murayghil مريغل
- Village
- Location of Murayghil in Syria
- Coordinates: 36°36′10″N 37°15′21″E
- Country: Syria
- Governorate: Aleppo
- District: Azaz
- Subdistrict: Sawran

Population (2004)
  - Total: 157
- Time zone: UTC+3 (AST)
- Geocode: C1670

Murayghil (Arabic: مريغل; Turkish: Mırgıl) is a village in northern Aleppo Governorate, northwestern Syria. Located halfway between Azaz and al-Rai, some 40 kilometres (25 mi) north of the city of Aleppo and 7 km (4.3 mi) south of the border with the Turkish province of Kilis, the village administratively belongs to Nahiya Sawran in Azaz District. Nearby localities include Rael 1 km (0.62 mi) to the southeast and al-Judaydah (Yani Yaban) 2 km (1.2 mi) to the south. In the 2004 census, Murayghil had a population of 157.

== Demographics ==
The village is inhabited by Turkmen. German traveler Martin Hartmann listed the village as Turkish village in late 19th century.
