= Tatiyah =

Tatiyah طاطية
- Village
- Location of Tatiyah in Syria
- Coordinates: 36°37′17″N 37°06′59″E
- Country: Syria
- Governorate: Aleppo
- District: Azaz
- Subdistrict: Azaz

Population (2004)
  - Total: 76
- Time zone: UTC+3 (AST)
- Geocode: C1558

Tatiyah (Arabic: طاطية) is a village in northern Aleppo Governorate, northwestern Syria. It is located on the Queiq Plain, 8 kilometres (5.0 mi) northeast of Azaz, 45 km (28 mi) north of the city of Aleppo, and 3.5 km (2.2 mi) south of the border with the Turkish province of Kilis.

The village administratively belongs to Nahiya Azaz in Azaz District. Nearby localities include Nayarah 1.5 km (0.93 mi) to the south and Salamah 3.5 km (2.2 mi) to the west.

== Demographics ==
In the 2004 census, Tatiyah had a population of 76.

In late 19th century, traveler Martin Hartmann noted Tatiyah as a Bedouin village of 7 households.
