= Ma'arin =

Ma'arin معرين
- Village
- Location in Syria
- Coordinates: 36°37′13″N 37°01′45″E
- Country: Syria
- Governorate: Aleppo
- District: Azaz
- Subdistrict: Azaz

Population (2004)
  - Total: 334
- Time zone: UTC+2 (EET)
  - Summer (DST): UTC+3 (EEST)
- Geocode: C1574

Ma'arin (Arabic: معرين; Turkish: Muarin) is a village in northern Aleppo Governorate, northwestern Syria. It is located 3 kilometres (1.9 mi) north of Azaz at the foot of Mount Barsa, 40 km (25 mi) north of the city of Aleppo, and 4 km (2.5 mi) south of the border to the Turkish province of Kilis.

The village administratively belongs to Nahiya Azaz in Azaz District. Nearby localities include Al-Krum at the opposite side of Mount Barsa, 4 km (2.5 mi) to the north, and Al-Salameh 4 km (2.5 mi) to the east. In the 2004 census, Ma'arin had a population of 334.

== Demographics ==
Ma'arin is a Turkmen village. In late 19th century, traveler Martin Hartmann noted Ma'arin as a Turkish village, then located in the Ottoman nahiyah of Azaz-i Turkman.
