= Kafr Kalbin =

Kafr Kalbin كفر كلبين
- Village
- Location within Syria
- Coordinates: 36°33′22″N 37°5′20″E
- Country: Syria
- Governorate: Aleppo Governorate
- District: A'zaz District
- Nahiyah: A'zaz

Population (2004 census)
  - Total: 2,146
- Time zone: UTC+3 (AST)

Kafr Kalbin (Arabic: كفر كلبين) is a village in northern Syria, administratively part of the A'zaz District of Aleppo Governorate, located northeast of Aleppo. Nearby localities include A'zaz to the northwest, Jarez to northeast and Kaljibrin to the southeast.

== Demographics ==
According to the Syria Central Bureau of Statistics, Kafr Kalbin had a population of 2,146 in the 2004 census. In late 19th century, traveler Martin Hartmann noted Kafar Kalbin as a settled Arab village of 20 houses.
