= Hawar Kilis =

Hawar Kilis حوار كلس: Havar Kilis; Havar
- Village
- Location in Syria
- Coordinates: 36°39′30.96″N 37°12′46.08″E
- Country: Syria
- Governorate: Aleppo
- District: Azaz
- Subdistrict: Sawran
- Elevation: 560 m (1,840 ft)

Population (2004) Census
  - Total: 438
- Time zone: UTC+2 (EET)
  - Summer (DST): +3
- Geocode: C1661

Hawar Kilis (Arabic: حوار كلس, romanized: Ḥiwār Kalas, Turkish: Havar Kilis or Havar), alternatively spelled Hiwar Kalas, is a village in northern Aleppo Governorate, northwestern Syria. It is located between Azaz and Al-Rai, on the Queiq Plain, some 45 kilometres (28 mi) north of the city of Aleppo, and just 2 km (1.2 mi) south of the border with the Turkish province of Kilis.

The village administratively belongs to Nahiya Sawran in Azaz District. Nearby localities include Zayzafun 3 km (1.9 mi) to the west and Baraghida 3 km (1.9 mi) to the south.

== Demographics ==
In the 2004 census, Hawar Kilis had a population of 438. The village is inhabited by Turkmen. In late 19th century, traveler Martin Hartmann noted Hawar as a Turkish village of 10 houses, then located in the Ottoman nahiyah of Azaz-i Turkman.

== See also ==
- Hawar Kilis Operations Room
