= Tulayl ash-Sham =

Tulayl ash-Sham تليل الشام
- Village
- Location of Tulayl ash-Sham in Syria
- Coordinates: 36°39′03″N 37°06′18″E
- Country: Syria
- Governorate: Aleppo
- District: Azaz
- Subdistrict: Azaz

Population (2004)
  - Total: 176
- Time zone: UTC+2 (EET)
  - Summer (DST): UTC+3 (EEST)
- Geocode: C1559

Tulayl ash-Sham (Arabic: تليل الشام) is a village in northern Aleppo Governorate, northwestern Syria. It is located on the Queiq Plain, 9 kilometres (5.6 mi) northeast of Azaz, 45 km (28 mi) north of the city of Aleppo, and less than 0.5 km (0.31 mi) east of the border with the Turkish province of Kilis.

The village administratively belongs to Nahiya Azaz in Azaz District. Nearby localities include Shamarikh 1.5 km (0.93 mi) to the southeast and Shamarin 2 km (1.2 mi) to the northeast. In the 2004 census, Tulayl ash-Sham had a population of 176.
