= Merin =

Merin may refer to:

- Měřín – a town in the Czech Republic
- Merîn – a village in Aleppo Governorate, Syria

== See also ==
- Merino (disambiguation)
