= 2024 Azaz bombing =

Car bombing in Azaz, Syria

- Part of Syrian Civil War
- Location: Azaz, Syria
- Date: 30 March 2024 +3 (EEST)
- Target: SIG
- Attack type: Car bombing
- Deaths: 8
- Injuries: 30+

On March 30, 2024, a car bomb was detonated in a market place in Azaz, Syria, targeting late-night shoppers. The explosion killed 8 people and injured at least 30. According to volunteer rescue group the White Helmets, two of those killed were children.

No group initially took responsibility for the bombing.

== See also ==
- Timeline of the Syrian civil war (2024)
