= Nahiyah Sawran =

Nahiyah Sawran may refer to:

- Sawran Subdistrict, Aleppo Governorate
- Suran Subdistrict, Hama Governorate
