= Duwaybiq =

Duwaybiq دويبيق
- Town
- Location in Syria
- Coordinates: 36°33′50″N 37°16′29″E
- Country: Syria
- Governorate: Aleppo
- District: Azaz
- Subdistrict: Sawran
- Elevation: 452 m (1,483 ft)

Population (2004)
  - Total: 1,862
- Time zone: UTC+2 (EET)
  - Summer (DST): UTC+3 (EEST)
- Geocode: C1659

Duwaybiq (Arabic: دويبق, romanized: Dūvaybık or Arabic: دويبيق, romanized: Duwaybīq; Turkish: Toybuk), also known as Duniq (Arabic: دونيق, romanized: Dūnīq), is a village in northern Aleppo Governorate, northwestern Syria. Located some 35 kilometres (22 mi) north of the city of Aleppo, it administratively belongs to Nahiya Sawran in Azaz District. Nearby localities include Ihtaimlat 2 km (1.2 mi) to the west, Dabiq 3 km (1.9 mi) to the south, and Turkman Bareh 5 km (3.1 mi) to the southeast.

== Demographics ==
In the 2004 census, Duwaybiq had a population of 1,862. The village is inhabited by Turkmen. Traveler Martin Hartmann noted the village as a Turkish village in late 19th century.
