= Hawar =

Hawar (or Hiwar) may refer to:

== Geography ==
- Hawar Islands, a group of Bahraini islands situated off the west coast of Qatar in the Gulf of Bahrain.
- Hawar (island), the largest of the Hawar Islands
- Hawar Kilis, a village in northern Aleppo Governorate, Syria

== Other uses ==
- Hawar Mulla Mohammed, Iraqi professional football player
- Hawar alphabet, a writing system for one dialect of the Kurdish language
- Hawar (magazine), a Kurdish magazine published between 1932 and 1943
- Hiwar (magazine), a CIA-funded literary journal published between 1962 and 1967
- Hawar News Agency
- Iraqi National Dialogue Front or Hiwar

== See also ==
- Hawar Kilis Operations Room, a coalition of rebel groups affiliated with the Free Syrian Army
