= Timeline of the Syrian civil war (January–October 2024) =

The following is a timeline of the Syrian civil war from January to October 2024. Information about aggregated casualty counts is found in Casualties of the Syrian civil war.

== January ==
On 1 January, nine Pro-Assad fighters were killed in an Islamic State ambush in the al-Tebni desert in the Deir ez-Zor countryside.

On 2 January, four members of the IRGC were killed after ISIS fighters attacked their positions in Al-Duwer town in eastern Deir Ezzor countryside.

On 3 January, three NDF militiamen were killed by a landmine planted by ISIS insurgents in the Al-Tabani desert in Deir Ezzor countryside.

On 9 January, at least 14 SAA soldiers were killed and 19 others were injured after ISIS militants ambushed a Syrian Army transport bus in the 'Third Station' area of the Palmyra desert.

On 18 January, three ISIS militants and a fighter of Liwa Fatemiyoun were killed in clashes south of the Arak oil field in the Homs countryside.

On the same day, at least 10 people were killed in a Jordanian airstrike in Urman in southern Syria.

On 19 January, four NDF militiamen were killed during an ISIS attack on a Syrian military post in the eastern Raqqa desert.

On 20 January, Israeli airstrikes in Damascus killed at least ten people, including the head of intelligence of the IRGC in Syria, his deputy, and two other IRGC officers.

On 22 January, five Syrian soldiers were killed in an IED explosion targeting their vehicle on a road near Al-Harra, Daraa.

On 24 January, a clash erupted between ISIS and NDF after their outpost was attacked by ISIS militants. As a result, an ISIS militant was killed.

On 25 January, a Syrian soldier was killed and two others wounded after striking a mine placed by ISIS.

On 26 January, ISIS attacked positions of Iran-backed Harakat Hezbollah al-Nujaba militia in Al-Shola Desert southern of Deir Ezzor, killing three members and injuring two others.

Between 27 and 28 January, 8 fighters affiliated with ISIS, including an Emir and 3 local gunmen were killed in armed clashes in Nawa, in the Daraa countryside.

On 29 January, ISIS gunmen ambushed a SDF patrol group, killing one SDF member and injuring several others.

On the same day, 8 people were killed in an Israeli airstrike in Sayyidah Zaynab, in the Rif Dimashq countryside.

On 31 January, ISIS executed two regime soldiers.

On the same day, SDF arrested two ISIS members from a refugee camp, with weapons and grenades also discovered in the camp.

The SOHR reported that at least 359 people were killed in Syria during January 2024.

== February ==
On 1 February, ISIS attacked positions in Al-Rasafah fortress in southern Al-Raqqaof, killing 2 and injuring 6 regime soldiers. Russian warplanes bombarded ISIS positions as retaliation.

On 2 February, U.S forces bombed Iran-backed militias in Iraq and Syria, killing at least 48 people.

On the same day, five people were killed after ISIS militants attacked a Syrian military position near the 'third station' area of the Homs countryside. This was in conjunction with Russian airstrikes on ISIS positions in the Palmyra desert.

Furthermore, four Asayish members were killed in a Turkish airstrike on a security checkpoint in Qamishli, north-eastern Syria.

On 3 February, two SDF members were shot dead by ISIS gunmen in Abu Hardub, in the Deir Ezzor countryside.

On the same day an ISIS member was arrested in Al-Hawl camp by Internal Security Forces.

On 4 February, An Iraqi Emir of ISIS and another member were killed in armed clashes with the Rapid Intervention Forces. According to security sources, the Emir was responsible for carrying out 80 assassinations inside Al-Hawl Camp and outside of it, where a large amount of weapons were also confiscated.

On the same day, a clash erupted between ISIS and Syrian Army forces, in Al-Sukhnah desert in eastern Homs countryside, killing two soldiers of the Syrian Army's 25th division and injuring two others.

On 5 February, three ISIS members and a member of Fatmiyoun Brigade of non-Syrian nationality were killed in a clash that erupted between them in north-east of Palmyra city in Homs countryside.

On the same day, an ISIS attack in western Deir Ezzor left a civilian dead and injured a commander in the Internal Security Forces Asayish and his driver.

Furthermore, seven SDF fighters were killed in an attack on the Al-Omar oil field by forces of the Islamic Resistance in Iraq.

On 7 February, ISIS members targeted “Al-Maqbarah” checkpoint of the Internal Security Forces “Asayish” with machineguns,east of Al-Raqqah city, resulted in the killing of a member.

On the same day, ten people, including six civilians, were killed in Israeli airstrikes on several areas in the Homs.

On 8 February, an ISIS attack on outpost of “Asayish” in Ghranyej town in eastern Deir Ezzor countryside left a commander of Internal Security Forces Asayish dead and another member injured.

On the same day, SDF arrests a man suspected to belonging to ISIS in Deir ezzor province.

On 10 February, five ISIS members were killed in a clash with Pro-regime forces, the clash erupted following an infiltration attempt by ISIS members into a military post on the vicinity of Arak field in northeastern Palmyra city.

On the same day, five SDF members were killed and another reported missing in an attack on their military checkpoint by unknown gunmen in Al-Sha’afa Town in eastern Deir Ezzor countryside.

On 11 February, ISIS attack on SDF members, left one SDF member dead and another injured in the eastern countryside of Deir Ezzor.

On the same day, one regime soldier was killed after ISIS attacked an outpost of regime forces in the eastern desert of Homs.

Furthermore, A raid conducted by SDF in eastern countryside of Deir Ezzor resulted in the arrest of eight ISIS members and seizing of weapons and other military equipments.

On 12 February, a car carrying pro-regime soldiers hit a mine planted by ISIS in the Hama countryside, resulting in the deaths of four and injuring two others.

On 13 February, nine SAA soldiers were killed in an ISIS attack on a Syrian military position in the Duwaizin area in eastern Hama countryside.

On the same day, five NDF fighters were killed in clashes with SDF forces in several villages in the eastern countryside of Deir ez-Zor.

On 15 February, ISIS attacked a group of truffle pickers in Al-Masrab desert in the western countryside of Deir Ezzor, resulting in the death of two civilians.

On 16 February, two members of the Russian-backed "Liwaa Al-Quds" were killed in a surprise attack by ISIS in Homs desert.

On 17 February, a regime soldier was killed after hitting a mine planted by ISIS.

On 19 February, an officer in the regime forces and a member of NDF Militia were killed in two separate attacks by “ISIS” members on the frontlines of Al-Sukhnah and Palmyra in the eastern countryside of Homs.

On the same day, two regime soldiers were killed and five injured after their vehicle hit a mine planted by ISIS.

On 23 February, two regime soldiers were killed and three injured after ISIS attacked their military vehicle on the road between Al-Rasafa and Athriya in the Syrian Desert.

On 24 February, five NDF militiamen were killed after ISIS militants launched an attack in the vicinity of Tel Salma area in Al-Salmiya countryside eastern of Hama.

On the same day, three NDF militiamen were killed by a landmine explosion, likely planted by ISIS insurgents, in the Deir ez-Zor desert.

On the same day, two ISIS members were killed and two regime soldiers killed and another one injured after ISIS attacked targeting military checkpoints near Al-Sokhna City in Homs countryside. In a separate incident an NDF militiamen was killed and another one injured after armed clashes erupted between the National Defence and ISIS cells near checkpoints on the road between Ja’aidin and Al-Rasafa in western Al-Raqqa countryside.

Furthermore, a member of NDF was killed by ISIS in Deir Ezzor countryside.

On 25 February, four guards working for the SDF were killed in an ISIS attack in Al-Raqqa province.

On the same day, 14 truffle farmers were killed and eight others were injured after their vehicle drove over an ISIS landmine south of Resafa, south of Raqqa.

On 27 February, three ISIS members were killed after their car hit a mine during an infiltration operation in west of Deir Ezzor.

The SOHR reported that at least 405 people were killed in Syria in February 2024.

== March ==
On 1 March, a member of NDF was killed in an ISIS attack in Jazarat Al-Bohimeed Village in western Deir Ezzor countryside.

On 2 March, three members of NDF were killed after hitting a mine planted by ISIS in Al-Tabany Desert in western Deir Ezzor countryside.

On the same day, one ISIS member was killed and another member arrested by SDF after ISIS attacked a police station in Al-Jazrah town in western Deir Ezzor countryside.

On 3 March, eight NDF militiamen were found shot dead after being executed by ISIS militants in the Jebel Bishri area. The group had been missing since 21 February.

On the same day, an officer of the regime forces was killed in an ISIS attack in eastern Al-Raqqa.

On 6 March, 18 people, including four NDF militiamen, were killed in a large-scale ISIS attack on truffle pickers in the Kabajeb desert south of Deir ez-Zor. A further 50 people were reported missing in the same attack.

On 7 March, seven NDF militiamen were killed in an ambush by ISIS militants in the Tel Salmah area of the eastern Hama countryside.

On 9 March, six truffle pickers were killed after their car drove over an ISIS landmine in the Al-Bushri desert in the western countryside of Deir Ezzor.

On the same day,a member of the Internal Security Forces “Al-Asayesh” was killed after their vehicle was targeted in an IED explosion by ISIS in eastern Deir Ezzor countryside.

On 10 March, ISIS gunmen killed two truffle pickers near Tuwaitan Village in Al-Omour Mountain western of Palmyra.

On 12 March, three NDF militiamen were killed and another three were injured in an ISIS attack on a military post in the Al-Tabani desert in western Deir Ezzor countryside.

On 13 March, four NDF militiamen were killed in an ISIS attack ona military position in eastern Homs countryside.

On the same day, three truffle pickers including two NDF members were killed and three missing in an ISIS attack in southern Deir Ezzor countryside.

Furthermore, two members of Liwaa Al-Quds were killed and three injured in an ISIS attack on the road between Palmyra and Deir Ezzor.

On 14 March, a member of SDF was shot dead by ISIS cells in western Deir Ezzor countryside.

On 15 March, the SOHR reported that 618,000+ people had been killed in the war in Syria since 15 March 2011.

On 16 March, 19 truffle farmers were blown up and killed by an ISIS landmine in the Al-Sabkhah area in the eastern countryside of Al-Raqqah.

On the same day, a member of SDF was shot dead by ISIS cells in northern Deir Ezzor countryside.

On 17 March, two ISIS members were killed in a clash with NDF in eastern Homs countryside.

On 19 March, three SAA soldiers were killed in the Sad Al-Wady Al-Abyad area in Palmyra Desert in eastern Homs countryside.

On 20 March, the SOHR had documented that since the beginning of Ramadan on March 11, ISIS had carried out 14 operations in the Syrian desert, killing 28 SAA/Pro-Assad militiamen.

On 22 March, two regime soldiers were killed in an ISIS attack in Deir ezzor desert.

On 24 March, 11 people were killed in an ambush by ISIS militants in the Al-Hamma area in Al-Raqqa Desert.

On the same day, an Iraqi ISIS official was killed in an operation by the SDF in Al-Raqqa city.

On 25 March, two members of a local militia supported by Iranian Revolutionary Guards were killed in an ISIS ambush in eastern Homs countryside.

On the same day, two members of ISIS who were involved in an attack at a security checkpoint were arrested by SDF.

On 26 March, in the early hours of the morning, at least 15 people, including 14 IRGC members, were killed in suspected Israeli airstrikes on a Pro-Iranian military HQ in Deir-ez-Zor city and positions in the nearby countryside.

On 27 March, four NDF militiamen were killed in an attack by ISIS insurgents on NDF military posts in the Al-Hamma desert in the northern countryside of Al-Raqqa.

On the same day, three NDF militiamen were killed and two others were wounded after ISIS fighters ambushed their military vehicle near Jahar junction on Homs-Palmyra highway.

On 28 March, two members of ISIS were killed and two arrested by the Internal security force "Al-Asayesh" in southern Al-Hasakah countryside.

On 29 March, at least 52 people were killed, including 38 Syrian Arab Army soldiers, seven Hezbollah fighters and seven Pro-Assad militiamen in an Israeli airstrike on a Hezbollah weapons depot in the Jabrin area of Aleppo.

On 30 March, six soldiers of the Syrian Army's 4th Division were executed in the Homs desert by ISIS after being captured on the road between Palmyra and Al-Sukhna in Homs countryside on March 27.

On 31 March, at least 8 people were killed and 20 others were injured after a bomb was detonated in a market in Azaz, northern Syria.

On the same day, ISIS executed 8 soldiers of the Syrian Army's 11th Armoured Division after contact with them was lost on March 26, in Kabajib area, while they were heading from Al-Sukhnah to Deir Ezzor.

The SOHR reported that at least 514 people were killed in Syria during March 2024.

== April ==
On 1 April, the Iranian embassy in Damascus, Syria was struck by an airstrike missile, killing as many as eight, including IRGC Brig. Gen. Mohammad Reza Zahedi. Syrian and Iranian officials identify Israel as the attackers.

According to SOHR, on the same day, HTS executed six people for 'opposing al-Sharaa' and for 'belonging to ISIS' in different areas under HTS control in northwestern Syria.

Furthermore, five soldiers of the SAA's 18th Division were killed in an ISIS infiltration operation on a Syrian military post in the Al-Sukhna Desert in eastern Homs countryside.

Three NDF militiamen were also killed after they drove over landmine planted by ISIS cells in the Al-Tabany Desert in the western Deir Ezzor countryside.

On 4 April, three soldiers of the SAA's 17th Division were executed by ISIS cells after they were captured in an infiltration operation on an SAA position in the Al-Shemaytiyah desert in Deir Ezzor countryside.

On 5 April, two NDF militiamen were killed and three others were wounded after ISIS launched an infiltration operation on SAA checkpoints in the Al-Awsaj area in western Deir Ezzor desert.

On 6 April, ISIS militants occupied territory near Al-Qasby and Al-Buwaitiya villages in Al-Tabany district in western Deir Ezzor countryside.

On the same day, eight children were killed after a bomb exploded in Al-Sanamayn, Daraa.

Between 6–7 April, at least 20 people were killed in clashes between the Syrian regime's Military Intelligence Directorate and a group of armed individuals led by a former 'State Security' employee in the city of Al-Sanamayn, Daraa.

On 18 April, six SAA soldiers were killed and two others were captured by ISIS militants after they attacked an SAA headquarters in the village of Hasarat near Abu Kemal in eastern Syria.

On the same day, just before midnight, at least 26 Pro-Assad fighters, including 19 Liwa al-Quds militiamen and 7 SAA soldiers, were killed after ISIS insurgents attacked a Syrian military bus near Al-Taybah village in the eastern countryside of Homs.

On 22 April, three regime soldiers were killed in an ISIS attack on military posts of the regime in Palmyra desert.

On 25 April, one ISIS member was killed and another arrested after clashes erupted between SDF and ISIS in Al-Jarzy Town in eastern Deir Ezzor countryside.

On 29 April, four SAA soldiers were killed after ISIS militants on SAA military positions south of Al-Tabqah city in the western countryside of Al-Raqqa.

On the same day, four NDF militiamen were killed in an ISIS ambush in the Al-Masrab desert in western Deir Ezzor countryside.

On 30 April, one SDF member was killed and two injured in an ISIS attack in the eastern countryside of Deir Ezzor.

The SOHR reported that at least 376 people were killed in Syria during April 2024.

== May ==
On 1 May, five members of ISIS were arrested by the SDF in an operation in Al-Raqqa City.

On 3 May, at least 17 NDF militiamen were killed after ISIS attacked three Pro-Assad military positions near the village of Al-Kawm to the north of Al-Sukhnah town in the eastern countryside of Homs.

On the same day, a clash broke out after ISIS members tried to assassinate a SDF commander in Deir ez-Zor countryside resulting in the death of an ISIS member and another one seriously injured.

On 4 May, two regime soldiers were killed by an IED planted by ISIS cells in the Hama desert.

On 9 May, an Emir of ISIS was arrested in an operation by the SDF with help of International coalition in Al-Raqqah city.

On 10 May, 23 SDF members were killed in an ISIS suicide car bombing outside an SDF HQ in eastern Deir ez-Zor. ISIS claimed that the bombing was carried out by "Abu Ibrahim Al-Ansari" and that the attack was revenge for the recent raids by the SDF, with support from US forces, against ISIS families at the al-Hol camp in Hasakah, and that it came following IS spokesman Abu Hudhayfah Al-Ansari's call (on 28 March) to increase attacks against the SDF, including by using suicide bombings.

On 14 May, A member of the NDF was killed and two others injured in an attack by ISIS on a military post in Homs desert.

On 17 May, an Iraqi ISIS official was killed in an operation carried out by the SDF with support of the coalition in Al-Busayrah city in the eastern countryside of Deir ez-Zor.

On 19 May, two "leaders" of ISIS were arrested in an operation carried by the SDF along with coalition forces in the northern desert of Deir ez-Zor, near the Syrian-Iraqi border.

On 20 May, at least six Hezbollah fighters were killed by an Israeli airstrike on a building in Al-Qusayr.

On 21 May, three regime soldiers including a lieutenant were killed in an ISIS attack in the desert near Homs.

On 23 May, an ISIS commander was arrested by the SDF in an operation in the Al-Raqqah countryside.

On 25 May, a Regime soldier was killed in an ISIS attack in the desert near Palmyra.

On 26 May, five members of an Iranian backed militia were killed in an IED blast by ISIS in Deir ez-Zor province.

On 28 May, three IRGC members were killed when ISIS cells opened fire at them in western Palmyra in the eastern countryside of Homs.

The SOHR reported that 254 people were killed in Syria during May 2024.

== June ==
On 2 June, an Israeli airstrike in a Weapon factory killed about 17 Iranian backed militia members including an Iranian advisor and three Lebanese Hezbollah members in the northern countryside of Aleppo.

On 3 June, an ISIS suicide bomber detonated his car bomb in entrance of the SDF military base near the town of Izbah in northern Deir Ezzor countryside, which resulted in the death of the ISIS suicide bomber himself and injury of a guard of SDF (per SDF). That same day another ISIS suicide bomber attacked another SDF base in al-Atala, which is also in northern Deir Ezzor, which ISIS then claimed responsibility for 2 days later, adding that the attacker "Abu Abdul-Rahman al-Ansari" attacked a SDF training site, "killing and wounding at least 15 SDF members". ISIS also stated that the attack was a part of its revenge campaign against the SDF for the imprisonment of ISIS families at the al-Hol camp, and as a response to the call by IS spokesman Abu Hudhayfah Al-Ansari (on 28 March) to intensify this campaign, with ISIS also boasting that this is the second suicide attack against the SDF in less than a month (first one on 10 May).

On 4 June, two ISIS members were killed in an IED explosion while trying to plant it in a road between Al-Hasakah and Al-Raqqa.

On 6 June, Six shepherds were killed in a massacre by suspected ISIS militants in the village of Abu Al-Alya village, in the eastern countryside of Homs.

On 8 June, As an act of revenge for killing Six Shepherds two days ago by ISIS cells, local shepherds attacked and killed two ISIS members and retook the herd of sheep captured by them.

On the same day, in two separate attacks by ISIS, four regime soldiers were killed in Al-Bukamal desert.

On 10 June, four regime soldiers were killed in an attack by ISIS cells in western Deir Ezzor.

On 12 June, 16 regime soldiers including a high-ranking officer were killed in an ISIS attack during a combing operation in Al-Sukhnah desert in Homs countryside.

On the same day, three regime soldiers were killed and two injured in an ISIS ambush in eastern Homs countryside.

On 14 June, four regime backed militiamen were killed in an ISIS attack on the military vehicle in the eastern countryside of Deir Ezzor.

On 15 June, in Separate attacks ISIS have attacked and killed five and injured one SDF members.

On 16 June, five members of the Russian-backed 25th Division were killed in an IED blast planted by ISIS members in Palmyra desert in the eastern countryside of Homs.

On 17 June, two members of ISIS were killed while trying to plant an IED beside a road in Al-Hawayij Thiban village in the eastern countryside of Deir Ezzor.

On 18 June, a British RAF reaper drone killed an ISIS militant in a strike in the Syrian desert.

On 19 June, a colonel of regime force was killed by ISIS militants in Homs desert.

On the same day, Israeli drone strikes targeting Syrian military sites in Quneitra and Daraa killed an officer and caused damage.

On 20 June, it was confirmed by the US General command that an US airstrike on 16 June killed a senior ISIS official named "Ossama Jamal Mohammed Ibrahim Al-Janabi".

On 30 June, four regime soldiers including a lieutenant were killed in an ISIS attack in the eastern countryside of Homs.

On the whole of June 2024, 332 people were killed including 138 civilians in the Syrian civil war.

== July ==
On 4 July, seven NDF militia members and two shepherds were killed by ISIS in Al-Raqqah desert.

On 9 July, an emir and two other members of ISIS was arrested by SDF in Al-Hasakah countryside.

On 10 July, two members of Russian-backed “Al-Quds Brigade” militia were killed in an ISIS attack in western Deir Ezzor countryside.

On 13 July, two regime soldiers were killed in an landmine explosion planted by ISIS in Deir Ezzor countryside and in another incident two NDF militiamen were killed by landmine planted by ISIS in Al-Sukhnah desert east of Homs countryside.

On the same day, two members of Hajin Military Council were killed by ISIS members in eastern Deir Ezzor countryside.

On 14 July, seven regime soldiers and one Iranian gunmen were killed and injured in an Israeli airstrike in military headquarters in the vicinity of Damascus, which was completely destroyed in the airstrike.

On 25 July, a SDF member was shot dead by ISIS cells in Al-Sabhah town in eastern Deir Ezzor countryside.

On 29 July, four SNA fighters were killed during an SDF infiltration operation on the Arida Ajil frontline in Tel Abyad countryside.

On the same day, three SNA fighters and a 'Tahrir Afrin' militant were killed in clashes on the Hazwan and Abla frontlines in the Al-Bab countryside.

On 30 July, two SNA fighters were killed by SDF artillery shelling in the Al-Arbaeen area in Al-Hasakah countryside.

The SOHR reported that at least 257 people were killed in Syria in July 2024.

== August ==
On 7 August, at least 10 people were killed, including 4 SNA fighters, and 13 others were injured after a bomb exploded in the back of a truck at a checkpoint in the city of Azaz.

On the same day, Arab tribal forces launched several attacks on the SDF-held side of the Euphrates river, capturing several SDF positions. The clashes left 7 people dead including one SDF fighter, three Arab militiamen and three civilians.

On 9 August, 11 civilians and two Iranian-backed militiamen were killed in clashes in Al-Dahlah and Al-Bulil villages in the Deir ez-Zor countryside.

On 10 August, an ISIS commander was killed in an operation by SDF in Suwaidan Town in Deir Ezzor.

On the same day, three SAA soldiers were killed and eight others were captured in clashes with Kurdish Asayish forces in Mujeibrah village in Al-Hasakah countryside.

On 11 August, at least eight Iraninan-backed militiamen were killed in a suspected American drone strike on their vehicle between the villages of Al-Kashmah and Al-Duweir in the eastern countryside of Deir Ezzor near the Syrian-Iraqi border.

On the same day, two civilians were killed in shelling between Pro-Assad militias and SDF forces Abu Al-Hamam town in the eastern countryside of Deir ez-Zor.

On 12 August, the SOHR reported that at least 45 people had been killed in the Pro-Assad/SDF clashes along the Euphrates river in the Deir ez-Zor countryside.

On 17 August, three Pro-Assad militiamen were killed in an ISIS ambush on their vehicle near the Al-Habil Oil Field in Homs.

On 18 August, four Syrian Army soldiers of the Russian-backed 5th Corps were killed in a heavy ISIS attack on their military headquarters in the eastern Al-Shoula area in southern Deir Ezzor desert.

On 26 August, the bodies of nine SAA soldiers of the 17th Division were found near the T3 junction in the Homs countryside. They were executed by ISIS militants with gunshots to the head after being reported missing a few days prior.

On the same day, two ISIS militants were arrested by the SDF in the southern countryside of Al-Hasakah.

On 30 August, a regime lieutenant was killed by ISIS cells during combing operations in Deir Ezzor desert.

On the same day, two regime soldiers were killed in an ISIS attack western of Palmyra City,.

The SOHR reported that 298 people including 154 civilians were killed in Syria in August 2024.

== September ==
On 1 September, three NDF militiamen were killed in an ISIS ambush in Athriya desert in the eastern countryside of Hama.

On 3 September, US forces along with SDF captured a senior ISIS leader named Khaled Ahmed al-Dandal, who allegedly helped three ISIS prisoners escape during a transfer to another prison days ago.

On 4 September, In an infiltration operation carried out by HTS on regime posts 12 regime soldiers were killed in the northern countryside of Latakia.

On 5 September, Seven regime soldiers were killed in two ISIS attacks in Athriya area in Hama countryside.

On 7 September, five SNA fighters were killed in an infiltration operation by 'Tahrir Afrin' militants of Anab and Marimin in the Afrin countryside north western of Aleppo.

On 8 September, ISIS released pictures of two beheaded captives that ISIS executed in the al-Tabqah desert for allegedly working with the SDF.

On 9 September, two NDF militiamen were killed in an ISIS attack on their position near Ethrayah-Al-Raqqah road in the Syrian desert.

On 13 September, an ISIS member was killed by a drone strike by International coalition forces while trying to plant an IED in a road in southern Al-Hasakah countryside.

On 15 September, four ISIS members including an emir were killed in an operation by International coalition in the vicinity of Al-Raqqa City.

On the same day, five members of a group affiliated with Hezbollah were killed in an ISIS ambush in Hama Desert.

On 16 September, a US airstrike in a ISIS training camp in central Syria killed 28 ISIS militants including 4 Senior leaders.

On 23 September, two SDF fighters were shot dead by ISIS insurgents in Al-Hawaiyj town, east of Deir Ezzor.

On 24 September, nine al-Qaeda affiliated Hurras al-Din jihadists, including a Senior leader named Marwan Bassam 'Abd-al-Ra'uf who oversaw military operations in Syria, were killed in a US drone strike on two military headquarters in Duwayr Al-Akrad area near Kabanah hills in Latakia countryside.

On 25 September, two fighters of the Manbij Military Council were killed and four others were injured after SNA forces fired a heat-seeking missile on the frontline of Kosa in eastern Aleppo countryside.

The SOHR reported that 341 people including 138 civilians were killed in the month of September.

== October ==
On October 2, a Pro-Iranian fighter was killed and two others injured in an ISIS landmine explosion.

On October 12, both the HTS and the Syrian Armed forces have brought reinforcements to the Aleppo countryside indicating the beginning of a new conflict as tensions between the groups have been high for the past few weeks.

On the same day, four regime soldiers were killed in an attack by ISIS gunmen in Deir Ezzor province.

On October 13, an SDF fighter and an SNA fighter were killed in an exchange of fire on frontlines.

On October 16, 11 civilians were killed in Russian airstrikes on the outskirts of Idlib city.

On October 29, an attack by ISIS cells on patrolling vehicles killed 7 regime soldiers and a civilian.

On October 30, an airstrike carried by US forces in an ISIS camp killed 35 militants in Syria.

On 31 October, eight SAA soldiers and a civilian were killed in an ISIS attack in Al-Raqqah.

The SOHR reported that 287 people including 152 civilians were killed in the month of October in the Syrian civil war.

== See also ==
- Timeline of the Syrian civil war (November 2024–present)
