= Rael =

Rael may refer to:

== People ==
=== Given name ===
- Rael (rapper) (born 1983), Brazilian singer, composer, and rapper
- Raël (born 1946), French UFO-religion leader and racing driver
- Rael Artel (born 1980), Estonian art writer, curator and gallerist
- Rael Dornfest, American computer programmer and author
- Rael Levitt (born 1971), South African businessman

==== Characters ====
- Rael, the protagonist of the 1974 concept album The Lamb Lies Down on Broadway by Genesis
- Rael, a character in the 1968 Star Trek episode "Wink of an Eye", played by actor Jason Evers
- Luthen Rael, a Star Wars character introduced in the TV series Andor

=== Surname ===
- Chris Rael, American musician and composer
- James Rael (born 1992), Irish rugby union player
- Joseph Rael (born 1935), Native American ceremonial dancer and shamanism writer
- Juan Bautista Rael (1900–1993), American linguist and folklorist
- Nguriatukei Rael Kiyara (born 1984), Kenyan long-distance runner

== Places ==
- Rael, Syria
- Rael Kedam

== Other uses ==
- "Rael", a song by The Who from the 1967 album The Who Sell Out
- Renewable and Appropriate Energy Laboratory (RAEL), at the University of California, Berkeley

== See also ==
- Raëlism, the UFO-religion founded by Raël
- Real (disambiguation)
