= Shamarin =

Shamarin شمارين
- Village
- Location of Shamarin in Syria
- Coordinates: 36°39′33″N 37°07′45″E
- Country: Syria
- Governorate: Aleppo
- District: Azaz
- Subdistrict: Azaz

Population (2004)
  - Total: 506
- Time zone: UTC+3 (AST)
- Geocode: C1566

Shamarin (Arabic: شمارين; Turkish: Şemmerin) is a village in northern Aleppo Governorate, northwestern Syria. It is located on the Queiq Plain, 10 kilometres (6.2 mi) northeast of Azaz, some 45 km (28 mi) north of the city of Aleppo, and less than 1 km (0.62 mi) south of the border with the Turkish province of Kilis. The village is inhabited by Turkmen.

The village administratively belongs to Nahiya Azaz in Azaz District. Nearby localities include Shamarikh 1.5 km (0.93 mi) to the south and Tulayl ash-Sham 2 km (1.2 mi) to the southwest. In the 2004 census, Shamarin had a population of 506.
