= Maraanaz =

Maraanaz مرعناز
- Village
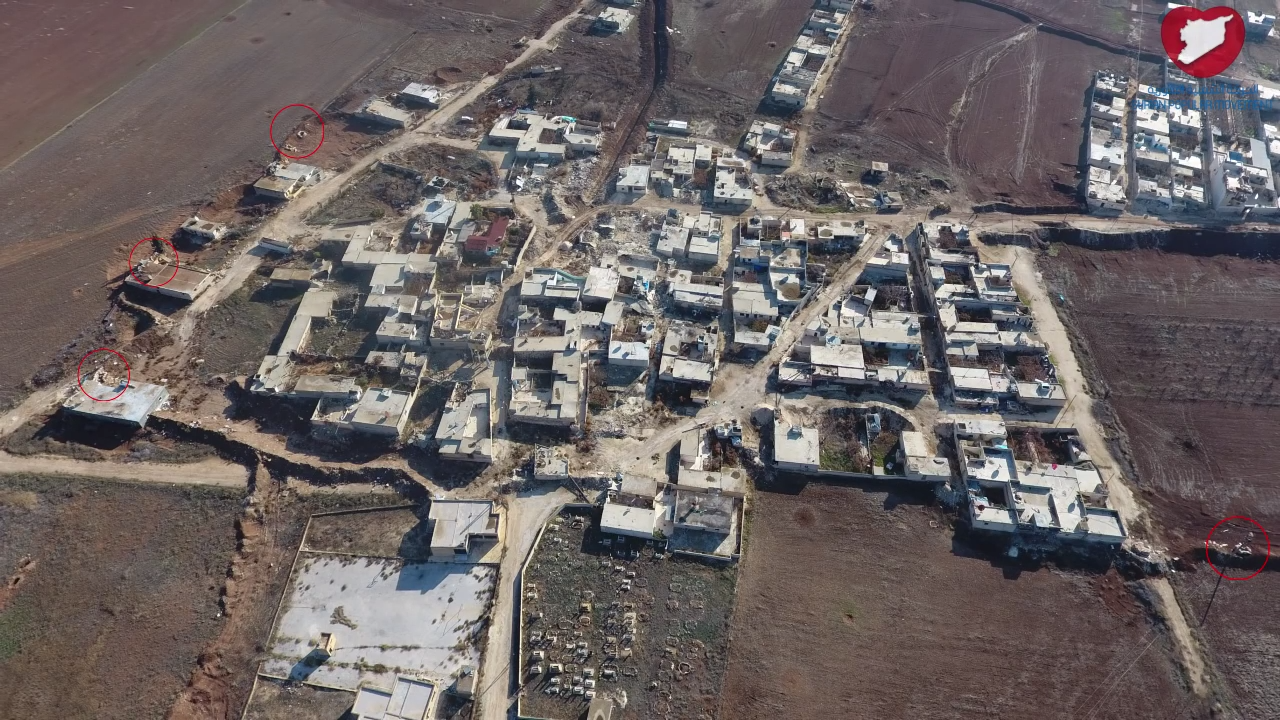
- Aerial view of Maraanaz in December 2016, during the Syrian civil war

- Location of Maraanaz in Syria
- Coordinates: 36°33′06″N 37°00′54″E
- Country: Syria
- Governorate: Aleppo
- District: Azaz
- Subdistrict: Azaz

Population (2004)
  - Total: 959
- Time zone: UTC+2 (EET)
  - Summer (DST): UTC+3 (EEST)
- Geocode: C1570

Maraanaz (Arabic: مرعناز, romanized: Mir'anāz) is a village near Azaz in northwestern Aleppo Governorate of northern Syria.

Administratively part of Nahiya Azaz, Maaranaz had a population of 959 in the 2004 census. Nearby localities include Azaz to the northeast, Menagh to the southeast, and Maryamin to the west.

Maraanaz is located by the Baghdad Railway connecting Aleppo with the Turkish city of Adana, and by the strategic highway 214 to Gaziantep.

As of 1 February 2025, the village was uninhabited.
