= Kaljibrin =

Kaljibrin كلجبرين
- Town
- Location within Syria
- Coordinates: 36°32′10″N 37°7′3″E
- Country: Syria
- Governorate: Aleppo Governorate
- District: A'zaz District
- Nahiyah: A'zaz

Population (2019 census)
  - Total: 15,000
- Time zone: UTC+3 (AST)

Kaljibrin (Arabic: كلجبرين) is a town in northern Syria, administratively part of the A'zaz District of Aleppo Governorate, located northeast of Aleppo. Nearby localities include Menagh to the west, Kafr Kalbin and A'zaz to the northwest, Jarez to northeast, Mare' to the southeast and Tell Rifaat to the southwest. According to the Syria Central Bureau of Statistics, Kaljibrin had a population of 3,291 in the 2004 census.
