= Azaz Subdistrict =

Azaz Subdistrict ناحية مركز أعزاز
- Subdistrict
- Location of Azaz Subdistrict within Aleppo Governorate

- Location in Syria
- Coordinates (Azaz): 36.5817°N 37.0722°E
- Country: Syria
- Governorate: Aleppo
- District: Azaz District
- Seat: Azaz

Area
  - Total: 180.12 km^{2} (69.54 sq mi)

Population (2004)
  - Total: 47,570
  - Density: 264.1/km^{2} (684.0/sq mi)
- Geocode: SY020400

Azaz Subdistrict (Arabic: ناحية مركز أعزاز, romanized: Nāḥiyah A‘zāz) is a subdistrict of Azaz District in northwestern Aleppo Governorate of northern Syria. Administrative centre is the city of Azaz. Neighbouring subdistricts are Sawran to the east, Tell Rifaat to the south, and the subdistricts Afrin and Bulbul of Afrin District to the west or southwest, respectively. To the north is the Kilis Province of Turkey.

At the 2004 census, the subdistrict had a population of 47,570.

== Cities, towns and villages ==
Cities, towns and villages of Azaz Subdistrict
PCode	Name	Population
C1564	Azaz	31,623
C1575	Kaljibrin	3,291
C1568	Kafr Kalbin	2,146
C1569	Menagh	2,128
C1561	Salama	1,408
C1573	Nayarah	1,337
C1570	Maraanaz	959
C1562	Jarez	945
C1556	Sijraz	735
C1571	Yahmul	612
C1566	Shamarin	506
C1574	Ma'arin	334
C1572	Naddah	305
C1565	Yazebax	252
C1567	Kafr Khasher	246
C1557	Shamarikh	226
C1563	al-Malikiyah	177
C1559	Tulayl ash-Sham	176
C1560	Fayruziyah	88
C1558	Tatiyah	76
