= Shamarikh =

Shamarikh شمارخ
- Village
- Location of Shamarikh in Syria
- Coordinates: 36°38′36″N 37°07′19″E
- Country: Syria
- Governorate: Aleppo
- District: Azaz
- Subdistrict: Azaz

Population (2004)
  - Total: 226
- Time zone: UTC+3 (AST)
- Geocode: C1557

Shamarikh (Arabic: شمارخ; Turkish: Şımarık) is a village in northern Aleppo Governorate, northwestern Syria. It is located on the Queiq Plain, 9 kilometres (5.6 mi) northeast of Azaz, 45 km (28 mi) north of the city of Aleppo, and 2.5 km (1.6 mi) south of the border with the Turkish province of Kilis.

The village administratively belongs to Nahiya Azaz in Azaz District. Nearby localities include Shamarin 1.5 km (0.93 mi) to the north and Tulayl ash-Sham 1.5 km (0.93 mi) to the west. In the 2004 census, Shamarikh had a population of 226. The village is inhabited by Turkmens. In late 19th century, traveler Martin Hartmann noted Shimmarik as a mixed village of Turks and Bedouins, then located in the Ottoman nahiyah of Azaz-i Turkman.
