= Al-Snoubari Park =

Park in Aleppo, Syria

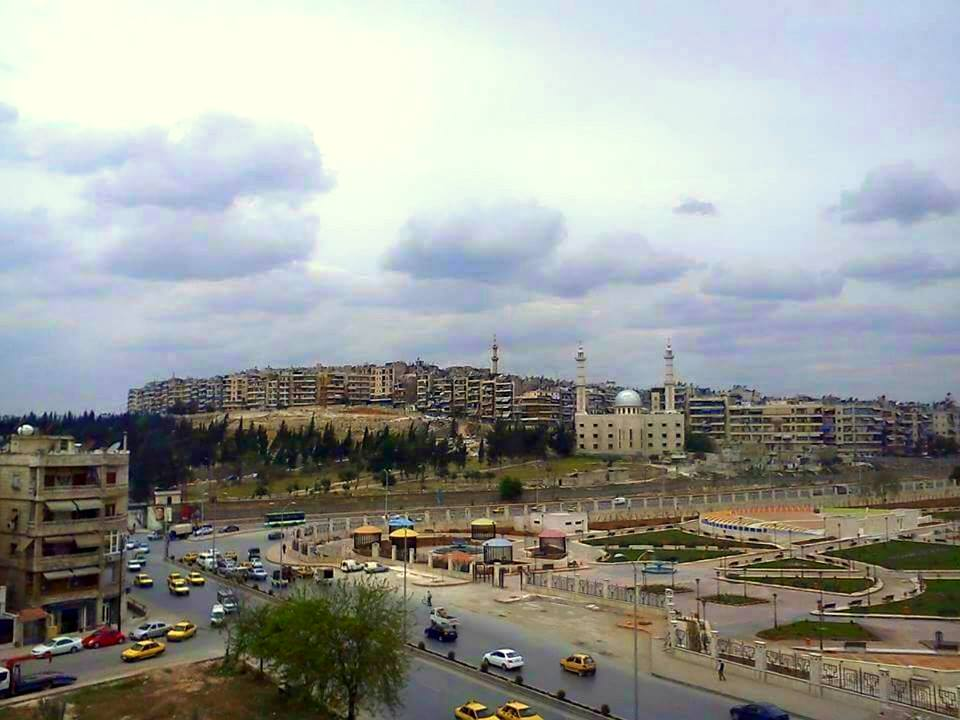
- Al-Snoubari Park (to the right)
- Interactive map of Al-Snoubari Park
- Type: Municipal
- Location: Bostan Pasha district, Aleppo
- Coordinates: 36°13′33″N 37°09′42″E
- Area: 11 hectares (27 acres)
- Created: 2011
- Operator: Aleppo city council
- Status: Open all year

Al-Snoubari Park (in Arabic: حديقة الصنوبري) is an 11 hectare urban park located in Aleppo, Syria. With an approximate length of 600 metres and a width of 170 metres, the park is located in the Bostan Pasha district of Aleppo, on the right bank of the Queiq River. The park was opened in November 2011 by the municipality with a total cost of US$ 6.5 million.

The park is home to an amphitheatre with a capacity of 3,000 seats.
