= Rael, Syria =

Rael راعل
- Town
- Location of in Syria
- Coordinates: 36°35′50″N 37°16′05″E
- Country: Syria
- Governorate: Aleppo
- District: Azaz
- Subdistrict: Sawran
- Elevation: 462 m (1,516 ft)

Population (2004)
  - Total: 1,750
- Time zone: UTC+2 (EET)
  - Summer (DST): UTC+3 (EEST)
- Geocode: C1665

Rael (Arabic: راعل, romanized: Rā'aīl), also spelled Ra'il, is a village in northern Aleppo Governorate, northwestern Syria. Located halfway between Azaz and al-Rai, some 40 kilometres (25 mi) north of the city of Aleppo and 8 km (5.0 mi) south of the border to the Turkish province of Kilis, the village administratively belongs to Nahiya Sawran in Azaz District. Nearby localities include Ihtaimlat 3 km (1.9 mi) to the south and Dabiq 5 km (3.1 mi) to the south. In the 2004 census, Rael had a population of 1,750. The village is inhabited by Turkmen. Traveler Martin Hartmann noted the village as a Turkish village in late 19th century.
