= Menagh =

Menagh منق
- Town
- Location of Menagh in Syria
- Coordinates: 36°31′31″N 37°02′52″E
- Country: Syria
- Governorate: Aleppo
- District: Azaz
- Subdistrict: Azaz

Population (2004)
  - Total: 2,128
- Time zone: UTC+2 (EET)
  - Summer (DST): UTC+3 (EEST)
- Geocode: C1569

Menagh (Arabic: منق, also spelled Manaq or Manq) is a town near Azaz 16 km North of Aleppo in northwestern Aleppo Governorate of northern Syria.

Administratively part of Nahiya Azaz, Manaq had a population of 2,128 in the 2004 census. Nearby localities include Azaz to the north, Maraanaz to the northwest, Kaljibrin to the east and Tell Rifaat to the south.

Menagh is located by the Baghdad Railway connecting Aleppo with the Turkish city of Adana, and by the strategic highway 214 to Gaziantep. The Menagh Military Airbase is situated immediately to the west of the village.

== History ==
During the Roman Empire Menagh was a Roman era station of the Roman Province of Syria. It was known as Minnica at this time.

=== Syrian Civil War ===
The Siege of Menagh Air Base took place here in 2013. The village was captured by the Syrian Democratic Forces on 9 February 2016. On 1 December 2024, Syrian opposition armed groups under the Dawn of Freedom Operations Room announced that they had taken control of Menagh.
