= Al-Salameh, Syria =

al-Salameh السلامة
- Village
- Location in Syria
- Coordinates: 36°37′08″N 37°04′30″E
- Country: Syria
- Governorate: Aleppo
- District: Azaz
- Subdistrict: Azaz

Population (2004)
  - Total: 1,408
- Time zone: UTC+2 (EET)
  - Summer (DST): UTC+3 (EEST)
- Geocode: C1561

al-Salameh (Arabic: السلامة, romanized: al-Salāmah), originally Suji (Turkish: Sucu) is a village in northern Aleppo Governorate, northwestern Syria. It is located on the Queiq Plain, 4 kilometres (2.5 mi) northeast of Azaz, 40 km (25 mi) north of the city of Aleppo, and 2 km (1.2 mi) south of the Bab al-Salameh Border Crossing to the Turkish province of Kilis. The village is inhabited by Turkmen.

The village administratively belongs to Nahiya Azaz in Azaz District. Nearby localities include Nayarah 3 km (1.9 mi) to the east, and Shamarikh 5 km (3.1 mi) to the northeast. In the 2004 census, Bab al-Salameh had a population of 1,408.

== History ==
Traveler Martin Hartmann noted the village as a Turkoman village in the late 19th century.
