= Sawran Subdistrict, Aleppo Governorate =

Sawran Subdistrict ناحية صوران
- Subdistrict
- Location of Sawran Subdistrict within Aleppo Governorate

- Location in Syria
- Coordinates (Sawran): 36.6036°N 37.2131°E
- Country: Syria
- Governorate: Aleppo
- District: Azaz District
- Seat: Sawran

Area
  - Total: 167.32 km^{2} (64.60 sq mi)

Population (2004)
  - Total: 30,032
  - Density: 179.49/km^{2} (464.87/sq mi)
- Geocode: SY020405

Sawran Subdistrict (Arabic: ناحية صوران, romanized: nāḥiyah Sawran) is a subdistrict of Azaz District in northwestern Aleppo Governorate of northern Syria, on the border with Turkey. The administrative centre is the town of Sawran. Neighbouring subdistricts are Azaz Subdistrict to the west, Akhtarin to the east and Mare' to the south. To the north is the Kilis Province of Turkey.

At the 2004 census, the subdistrict had a population of 30,032.

== Cities, towns and villages ==
Cities, towns and villages of Sawran Subdistrict
PCode	Name	Population
C1664	Sawran	6,988
C1667	Ihtaimlat	6,764
—N/a	al-Yamamah	3,547
C1672	Kafra	2,859
C1659	Duwaybiq	1,862
C1665	Rael	1,750
C1668	Odaya	1,564
C1663	Baraghida	995
C1658	Zayzafun	820
C1660	Shweirin	695
C1669	al-Bil	563
C1657	al-Yaarubiyah	552
C1661	Hawar Kilis	438
C1666	az-Zahiriyah	194
C1670	Murayghil	157
C1671	Kafr Barja	126
C1673	Kafr Shoush	95
C1662	al-Judaydah	63
