= Jarez =

Jarez جارز
- Village
- Location within Syria
- Coordinates: 36°34′14″N 37°8′53″E
- Country: Syria
- Governorate: Aleppo Governorate
- District: A'zaz District
- Nahiyah: Nahiya Azaz

Population (2004 census)
  - Total: 945
- Time zone: UTC+2 (EET)
  - Summer (DST): UTC+3 (EEST)

Jarez (Arabic: جارز, romanized: Jārīz, also spelled Jarz; Turkish: Carıs) is a village in northern Syria, administratively part of the A'zaz District of Aleppo Governorate, located north of Aleppo. Nearby localities include A'zaz to the west, Kaljibrin to the southwest and Mare' to the southeast. According to the Syria Central Bureau of Statistics, Jarez had a population of 945 in the 2004 census. German traveler Martin Hartmann listed the village as Turkish in late 19th century. The village is inhabited by Turkmen.
