= Mount Barsa =

Mountain in Syria

- Location within Syria

Highest point
- Elevation: 848 m (2,782 ft)
- Coordinates: 36°38′0″N 37°1′24″E

Naming
- Native name: جبل برصة (Arabic)

Geography
- Location: Aleppo Governorate, Syria

Mount Barṣa (Arabic: جبل برصة ǧabal Barṣa [ˈd͡ʒæbæl ˈbærsˤa], Barṣa being a shortening of Barṣāyā) is a mountain in Aleppo Governorate in northern Syria. The mountain is located between Azaz District and Afrin District.

== Borders and description ==
The mountain is located between the Aʻzāz plain and the valley of River ʻIfrīn from east and west, respectively. To the south lie Mount Simeon, and to the north the plain of Kilis where the Akpınar River, one of the headwaters of Quweiq, rises.

The height of Mount Barṣa is 848m. The mountain is drained by an intermittent river called Aʻzāz River, which drains into the Quweiq and forms the northern boundary of Mount Simeon.

== Syrian Civil War ==
The Syrian government retreated from the area in spring 2012 as per an agreement with the PYD, and the entire territory of Afrin saw almost no conflict for the next five years of the war. The mountain was however the site of fierce fighting between Turkish troops and Kurdish militants during the Turkish military operation in Afrin in late January 2018, where it was captured by Turkish troops. The area was heavily fortified with concrete bunkers, trenches and tunnels constructed by the defending militants.
