= Baraghida =

Baraghida براغيدة
- Village
- Location of Baraghida in Syria
- Coordinates: 36°38′00″N 37°12′49″E
- Country: Syria
- Governorate: Aleppo
- District: Azaz
- Subdistrict: Sawran
- Elevation: 474 m (1,555 ft)

Population (2004)
  - Total: 995
- Time zone: UTC+2 (EET)
  - Summer (DST): UTC+3 (EEST)
- Geocode: C1663

Baraghida (Arabic: براغيدة, romanized: Barāghīdah) is a village in northern Aleppo Governorate, northwestern Syria. Located halfway between Azaz and al-Rai, some 45 kilometres (28 mi) north of the city of Aleppo and 4 km (2.5 mi) south of the border to the Turkish province of Kilis. The village administratively belongs to Nahiya Sawran in Azaz District. Nearby localities include Kafr Ghan 3 km (1.9 mi) to the west, Dudiyan 7 km (4.3 mi) to the east and Sawran 8 km (5.0 mi) to the south.

== Demographics ==
In the 2004 census, Baraghida had a population of 995. The village is inhabited by Turkmen. In late 19th century, traveler Martin Hartmann noted Baraghida as a Turkish village of 10 houses, then located in the Ottoman nahiyah of Azaz-i Turkman.
