= Nayarah =

Nayarah نيارة Nijar (نيارة)
- Village
- Location of Nayarah in Syria
- Coordinates: 36°36′26″N 37°06′32″E
- Country: Syria
- Governorate: Aleppo
- District: Azaz
- Subdistrict: Azaz

Population (2004)
  - Total: 1,337
- Time zone: UTC+2 (EET)
  - Summer (DST): UTC+3 (EEST)
- Geocode: C1573

Nayarah (Arabic: نيارة), alternatively spelled Niyarah, is a village in northern Aleppo Governorate, northwestern Syria. It is located at 37.14439 36.43264 on the Queiq Plain, 5 kilometres (3.1 mi) northeast of Azaz, 40 km (25 mi) north of the city of Aleppo, and 4 km (2.5 mi) south of the border with the Turkish province of Kilis.

The village administratively belongs to Nahiya Azaz in Azaz District. Nearby localities include al-Salameh 3 km (1.9 mi) to the west and Tatiyah 1.5 km (0.93 mi) to the north. In the 2004 census, Nayarah had a population of 1,337.

During the Roman Empire Nayarah/Nijar was a civitas of the Roman Province of Syria, known as Niara.

== Demographics ==
In late 19th century, traveler Martin Hartmann noted Nayarah as a Turkish village of 15 households, then located in the Ottoman nahiyah of Azaz-i Turkman.
