= Ihtaimlat =

Ihtimillet احتملات
- Town
- Location in Syria
- Coordinates: 36°33′56″N 37°15′02″E
- Country: Syria
- Governorate: Aleppo
- District: Azaz
- Subdistrict: Sawran
- Elevation: 443 m (1,453 ft)

Population (2004)
  - Total: 6,764
- Time zone: UTC+2 (EET)
  - Summer (DST): UTC+3 (EEST)
- Geocode: C1667

Ihtimillet (Arabic: احتملات, romanized: Iḩtimillet) or Ihtaimlat (Arabic: إحتيملات, romanized: Iḩtaymilāt), also spelled Ihtaymilat, Ahtaymalat or Hetemlat, is a town in northern Aleppo Governorate, northwestern Syria. Located some 35 kilometres (22 mi) north of the city of Aleppo, it administratively belongs to Nahiya Sawran in Azaz District. Nearby localities include Sawran 3 km (1.9 mi) to the west and Dabiq 3 km (1.9 mi) to the south. In the 2004 census, Ihtaimlat had a population of 6,764. The village is inhabited by Arab and a minority of Turkman
