= Dudyan =

Dudiyan دوديان
- Village
- Location of Dudiyan
- Coordinates: 36°38′02″N 37°17′19″E
- Country: Syria
- Governorate: Aleppo
- District: Azaz
- Subdistrict: Akhtarin
- Elevation: 478 m (1,568 ft)

Population (2004)
  - Total: 1,164
- Time zone: UTC+2 (EET)
  - Summer (DST): UTC+3 (EEST)
- Geocode: C1591

Dudiyan (Arabic: دوديان, romanized: Dūdīyān; Turkish: Düden) is a village in northern Aleppo Governorate, northwestern Syria. About 45 kilometres (28 mi) northeast of the city of Aleppo and just 4 km (2.5 mi) south of Syria's border with Turkey, it is administratively part of Nahiya Akhtarin of Azaz District. Nearby localities include Baraghida 7 km (4.3 mi) to the west and Tat Hims 9 km (5.6 mi) to the east. In the 2004 census, Dudiyan had a population of 1,164. Traveler Martin Hartmann noted the village as a Turkmen village in late 19th century. Dudiyan is inhabited by Turkmen. The village council has a total of six settlements affiliated with it (Dudiyan, Jaka, Kamaliya, Khalaftili, Baghidin, Qurah Mazr‘a). As of early 2023, its total population of 5,057 people, the majority of whom were displaced persons from other areas of Syria.
