= Sawran, Aleppo Governorate =

Sawran صوران
- Town
- Location of Sawran in Syria
- Coordinates: 36°33′57″N 37°12′46″E
- Country: Syria
- Governorate: Aleppo
- District: Azaz
- Subdistrict: Sawran
- Elevation: 444 m (1,457 ft)

Population (2020)
  - Total: 16,998
- Time zone: UTC+2 (EET)
  - Summer (DST): UTC+3 (EEST)
- Geocode: C1664

Sawran (Arabic: صوران, romanized: Ṣawrān), also spelled Suran, Souran or Sawwaran, is a town in northern Aleppo Governorate, northwestern Syria. Located 22 kilometres (14 mi) north of the city of Aleppo, it is the administrative centre of Nahiya Sawran in Azaz District. Nearby localities include A'zaz and Kafra to the west, Ihtaimlat and Dabiq to the east and Mare' to the south. In the 2004 census, Sawran had a population of 6,988. The town is mainly inhabited by Turkmens.

Sawran is the administrative center of Nahiya Sawran of the Azaz District.

== History ==
Sawran's history dates back to the Iron Age when it was an Aramaean settlement in the Kingdom of Bit Adini known as "Surunu." In a military campaign against Bit Adini's king Ahuni, the Neo-Assyrian king Shalmaneser III raided and captured Surunu. It later came under the rule of Assyrian king Tiglath Pileser III.

During the Byzantine era in Syria, Sawran was inhabited by the Arab tribe of Tanukh. Before the Muslim conquest it served an Arab Christian center and contained a fortified monastery. During early Islamic rule, Sawran was part of Jund Qinnasrin ("Military District of Chalcis"), part of the larger Bilad al-Sham province.

=== Syrian civil war ===
During the Syrian civil war, the town saw two massacres of pro-opposition civilians by pro-government regular and irregular forces: on 20 May 2012 (37 civilian casualties) and on 8 February 2018 (30 civilian casualties). The Islamic State in Iraq and the Levant (ISIL) took control of the town on 31 May 2015. On 16 October 2016, Turkish-backed rebels captured the town from ISIL.

== Bibliography ==
- Bryce, Trevor (2009). The Routledge Handbook of The People and Places of Ancient Western Asia: The Near East from the Earky Bronze Age to the fall of the Persians Empire. Routledge. ISBN 978-1134159086.
- Lipinsky, Edward (2000). The Aramaeans: Their Ancient History, Culture, Religion. Peeters Publishers. ISBN 9042908599.
- Shahid, Irfan (2009). Byzantium and the Arabs in the Sixth Century, Part 2. Harvard University Press. ISBN 978-0884023470.
