= Azaz =

City in northwest Syria

Azaz أَعْزَاز
- City
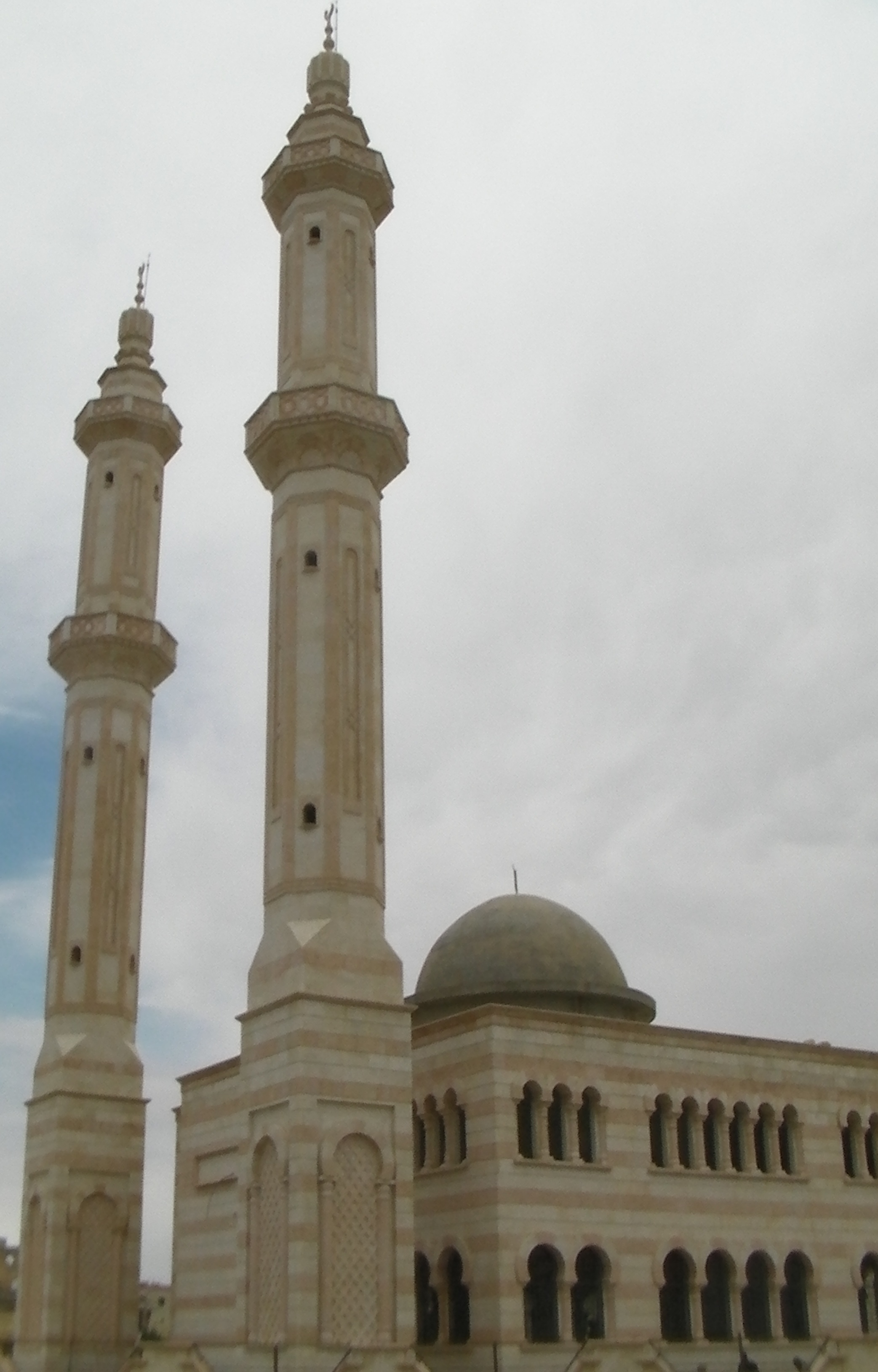

- Location in Syria
- Coordinates: 36°35′10″N 37°02′41″E
- Country: Syria
- Governorate: Aleppo
- District: Azaz
- Subdistrict: Azaz
- Elevation: 560 m (1,840 ft)

Population (2004)
  - Total: 31,623
- Time zone: UTC+3 (AST)

Azaz is the administrative center of Nahiya Azaz and the Azaz District.

Azaz (Arabic: أَعْزَاز, romanized: ʾAʿzāz) is a city in northwest Syria, roughly 20 miles (32 kilometres) north-northwest of Aleppo. According to the Syria Central Bureau of Statistics (CBS), Azaz had a population of 31,623 at the 2004 census. As of 2015, its inhabitants were almost entirely Sunni Muslims, mostly Arabs but also some Turkmen.

It is historically significant as the site of the Battle of Azaz between the Crusader States and the Seljuk Turks on June 11, 1125. It is close to a Syria–Turkey border crossing, which enters Turkey at Öncüpınar, south of the city of Kilis. During the Syrian civil war, Azaz was included from 2016 in the Turkish occupation zones, becoming the capital of the opposition's Syrian Interim Government.

== History ==
The city was known in ancient times with different names: in Hurrian as Azazuwa, in Medieval Greek as Αζάζιον (Azázion), in Old Aramaic as Ḥzz (later evolved in Neo-Assyrian as Ḫazazu).

=== Early Islamic period ===
In excavations of the site of Tell Azaz, considerable quantities of ceramics from the early and middle Islamic periods were found. Despite the importance of Azaz as indicated by archaeological finds, the settlement was rarely mentioned in Islamic texts prior to the 12th century. However, a visit to the town by the Muslim musician Ishaq al-Mawsili (767–850) gives some indication of Azaz's importance during Abbasid rule. The Hamdanids of Aleppo (945–1002) built a brick citadel at Azaz. It was a square fortress with two enclosures, situated atop a tell.

On 10 August 1030, Tubbal near Azaz became the scene of a humiliating defeat of the Byzantine emperor Romanos III at the hands of the Mirdasids. In December of the same year, the Byzantine generals Niketas of Mistheia and Symeon besieged and captured Azaz, and burned Tubbal to the ground in retaliation.

=== Crusader period ===
During the Crusader era, Azaz, which was referred to in Crusader sources as "Hazart", became of particular strategic significance due to its topography and location, overlooking the surrounding region. In the hands of the Muslims, Azaz stymied communications between the Crusader states of Edessa and Antioch, while in Crusader hands it threatened the major Muslim city of Aleppo. Around December 1118, the Crusader prince Roger of Antioch and the Armenian prince Leo I besieged and captured Azaz from the Turcoman prince Ilghazi of Mardin.

In January 1124, Balak and Toghtekin, the Burid atabeg of Damascus, breached Azaz's defenses, but were repulsed by Crusader reinforcements. In April 1125, the Seljuk atabeg Aqsunqur al-Bursuqi of Mosul and Toghtekin invaded the Principality of Antioch and surrounded Azaz. In response, in May or June 1125, a 3,000-strong Crusader coalition commanded by King Baldwin II of Jerusalem confronted and defeated the 15,000-strong Muslim coalition at the Battle of Azaz, raising the siege of the town.

However, the Crusaders' strength in the region was dealt a blow following the Zengid capture of Edessa in 1144. Afterward, the other fortresses in the County of Edessa, including Azaz, gradually became neglected. In 1146, Humphrey II of Toron sent sixty knights to reinforce the garrison at Azaz. Despite its strong fortifications, the fortress of Azaz finally fell to the Muslims under the Zengid emir of Aleppo, Nur ad-Din in June 1150.

=== 13th–20th centuries ===
The Ayyubid emir of Aleppo, al-Aziz Uthman, rebuilt the earlier Hamdanid structure at Azaz with stone. During Ayyubid rule, in 1226, the local historian Yaqut al-Hamawi, described Azaz as a "fine town", referring to the settlement as "Dayr Tell Azaz". It was the center of a district bearing its name that also included the market towns or forts of Kafr Latha, Mannagh, Yabrin, Arfad, Tubbal and Innib. The Mamluk Sultanate ruled over the area from the 13th century. The Ottomans entered the area in 1516 with a victory at the Battle of Marj Dabiq. Azaz continued to be inhabited by Turkmen in the Ottoman era. It was a sanjak administrative division along with that of Kilis. After the fall of the Ottoman Empire in the early 20th century, the new Syria-Turkey border ran just north of Azaz. The town was first part of the French colonial empire's Mandate for Syria and the Lebanon and, from 1946, the independent state of Syria.

=== Syrian civil war ===
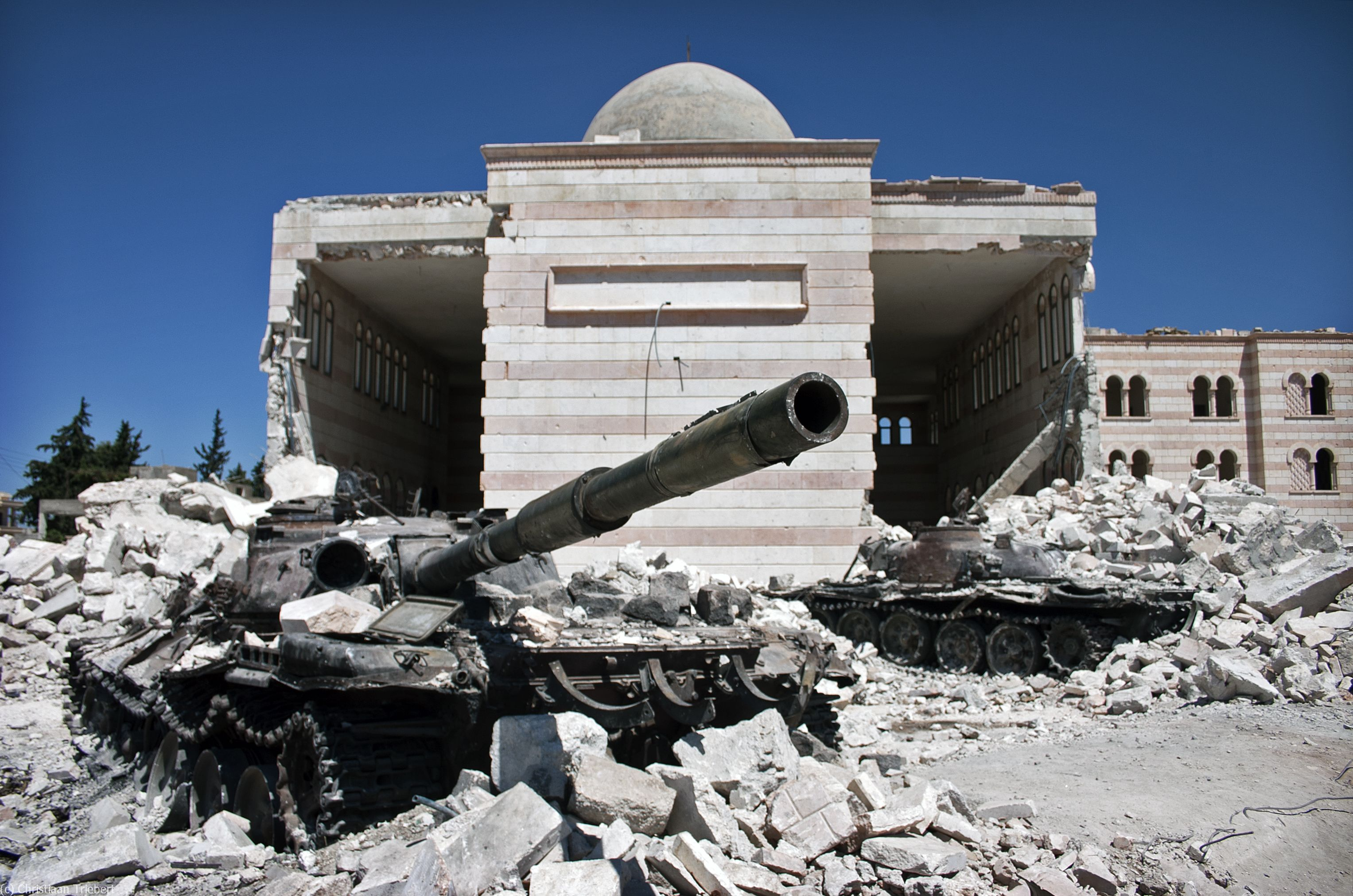
Azaz, Syrian Civil War 2012

On 19 July 2012, during the Syrian civil war, rebels opposed to the Syrian government succeeded in capturing the town. The town is highly valued as a logistical supply route close to the Turkish–Syrian border.

The Islamic State (ISIS) took control of Azaz in October 2013, but withdrew from the city in February 2014 after having been cut off from the rest of its territory.

Following the departure of ISIS, Azaz was left under the control of Northern Storm, a brigade under the authority of the Islamic Front, nominally a part of the Free Syrian Army (FSA) at that time. A Sharia Committee was responsible for the administration of sharia law, and was policed by the Northern Storm brigade. A Civil Council governed the field of public services. During its northern offensive in 2015, ISIS approached Azaz, but fell short of directly assaulting the city; taking Kafra and surrounding territory. While regular ISIS forces were finally expelled from the Aleppo Governorate in October 2016, the January 2017 Azaz bombing was attributed to ISIS.

In January 2015, al-Nusra Front had a limited presence in the town and controlled one mosque. By October 2015, the control of the town was shared between Al-Nusra Front and the Northern Storm Brigade of the FSA.

Turkey began organising Turkmen militia bases in Azaz during the People's Protection Units (YPG) advance against rebels in February 2016, in order to prevent the Kurdish YPG from obtaining a land bridge between the Afrin and Kobanî Cantons. The Turkish government declared Azaz to be a "red line" which Kurdish forces must not cross. Azaz became one of the first towns to come under the Turkish occupation of northern Syria during the 2016 Operation Euphrates Shield. By late 2017, Azaz was the headquarters of the Syrian Interim Government. The pro-Turkish forces' control over the area did not end until the Interim Government was incorporated into the Syrian caretaker government at the end of January 2025.

== Climate ==
Azaz has a hot-summer Mediterranean climate (Köppen climate classification Csa).

Climate data for Azaz, elevation 555 m (1,821 ft)
Month	Jan	Feb	Mar	Apr	May	Jun	Jul	Aug	Sep	Oct	Nov	Dec	Year
Mean daily maximum °C (°F)	9.1 (48.4)	10.8 (51.4)	15.1 (59.2)	20.7 (69.3)	26.7 (80.1)	32.0 (89.6)	34.5 (94.1)	34.7 (94.5)	31.0 (87.8)	25.5 (77.9)	17.6 (63.7)	10.8 (51.4)	22.4 (72.3)
Daily mean °C (°F)	5.3 (41.5)	6.5 (43.7)	10.0 (50.0)	14.6 (58.3)	19.7 (67.5)	24.6 (76.3)	27.0 (80.6)	27.2 (81.0)	24.1 (75.4)	19.1 (66.4)	12.5 (54.5)	7.0 (44.6)	16.5 (61.7)
Mean daily minimum °C (°F)	1.3 (34.3)	2.2 (36.0)	4.8 (40.6)	8.6 (47.5)	12.8 (55.0)	17.2 (63.0)	19.5 (67.1)	19.7 (67.5)	17.2 (63.0)	12.8 (55.0)	7.5 (45.5)	3.5 (38.3)	10.6 (51.1)
Average precipitation mm (inches)	89 (3.5)	82 (3.2)	68 (2.7)	44 (1.7)	22 (0.9)	3 (0.1)	1 (0.0)	1 (0.0)	4 (0.2)	22 (0.9)	44 (1.7)	89 (3.5)	469 (18.4)
Source: FAO

== Bibliography ==
- Bylinski, Janusz (2004). "Three Minor Fortresses in the Realm of the Ayyubid Rulers of Homs in Syria: Shumaimis, Tadmur (Palmyra) and al-Rahba". In Faucherre, Nicolas; Mesqui, Jean; Prouteau, Nicolas (eds.). La fortification au temps des croisades. Presses universitaires Rennes. ISBN 978-2-86847-944-0.
- Deschamps, Paul (1973). Les châteaux des Croisés en terre sainte III: la défense du comté de Tripoli et de la principauté d'Antioche (in French). Paris: Librairie Orientaliste Paul Geuthner.
