= Azaz District =

Azaz District منطقة أعزاز
- District
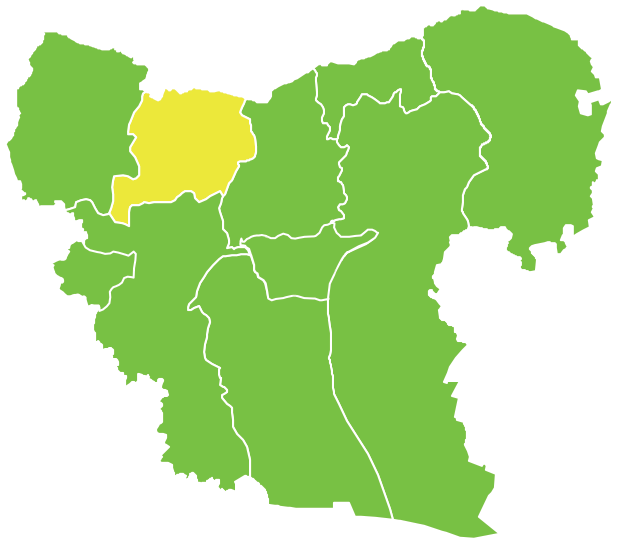
- Location of Azaz District within Aleppo Governorate

- Location in Syria
- Coordinates (Azaz): 36.35°N 37.03°E
- Country: Syria
- Governorate: Aleppo
- Seat: Azaz
- Subdistricts: 6 nawāḥī

Area
  - Total: 1,259.96 km^{2} (486.47 sq mi)

Population (2004)
  - Total: 251,769
  - Density: 199.823/km^{2} (517.539/sq mi)
- Geocode: SY0204

Azaz District (Arabic: منطقة أعزاز, romanized: manṭiqat A'zāz) is a district of Aleppo Governorate in northern Syria. The administrative centre is the city of Azaz. At the 2004 census, the district had a population of 251,769.

Subdistricts of Azaz District

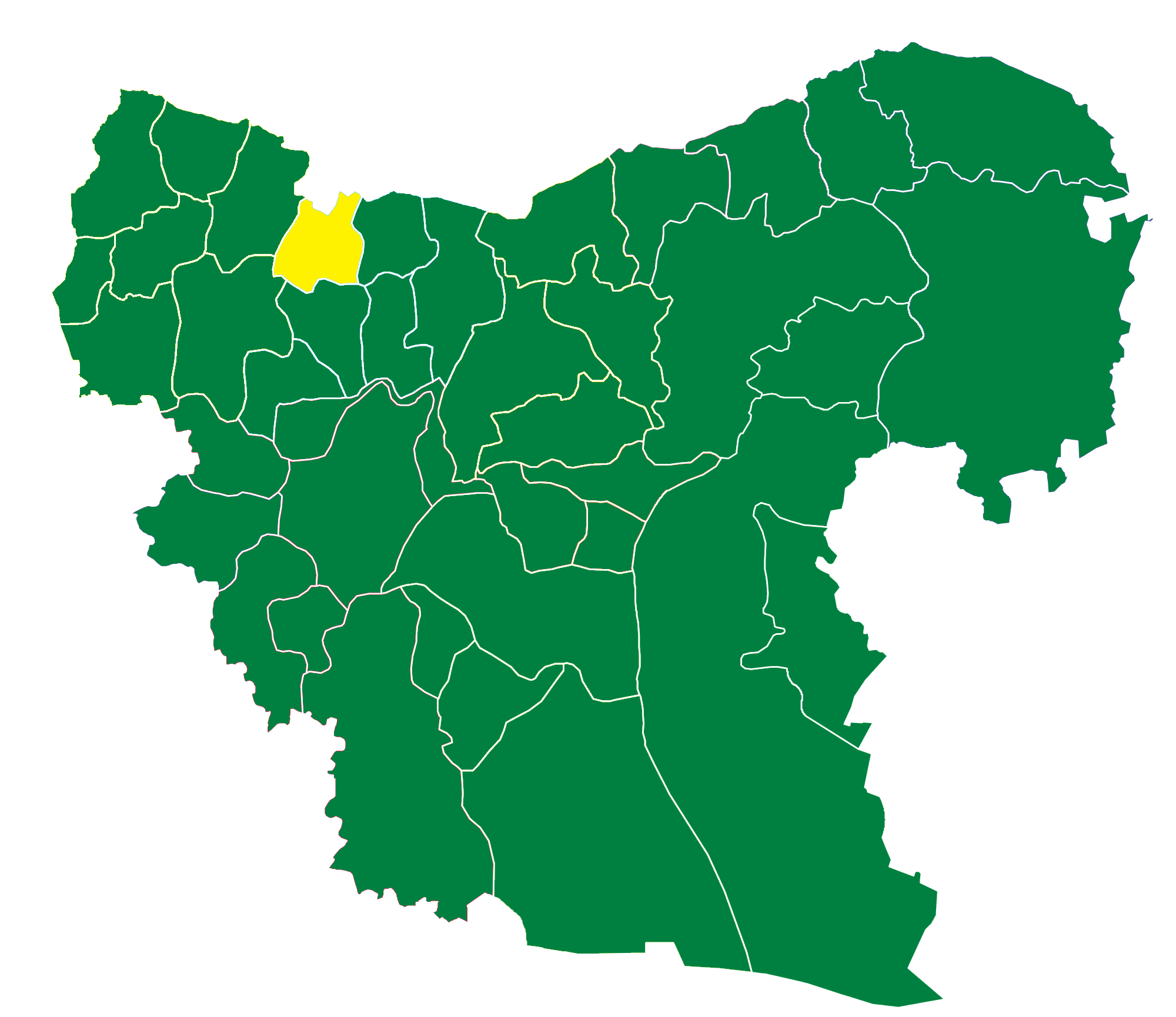
The administrative center of Azaz Subdistrict shown above is the city of Azaz.

The administrative center of Tell Rifaat Subdistrict shown above is the city of Tell Rifaat.

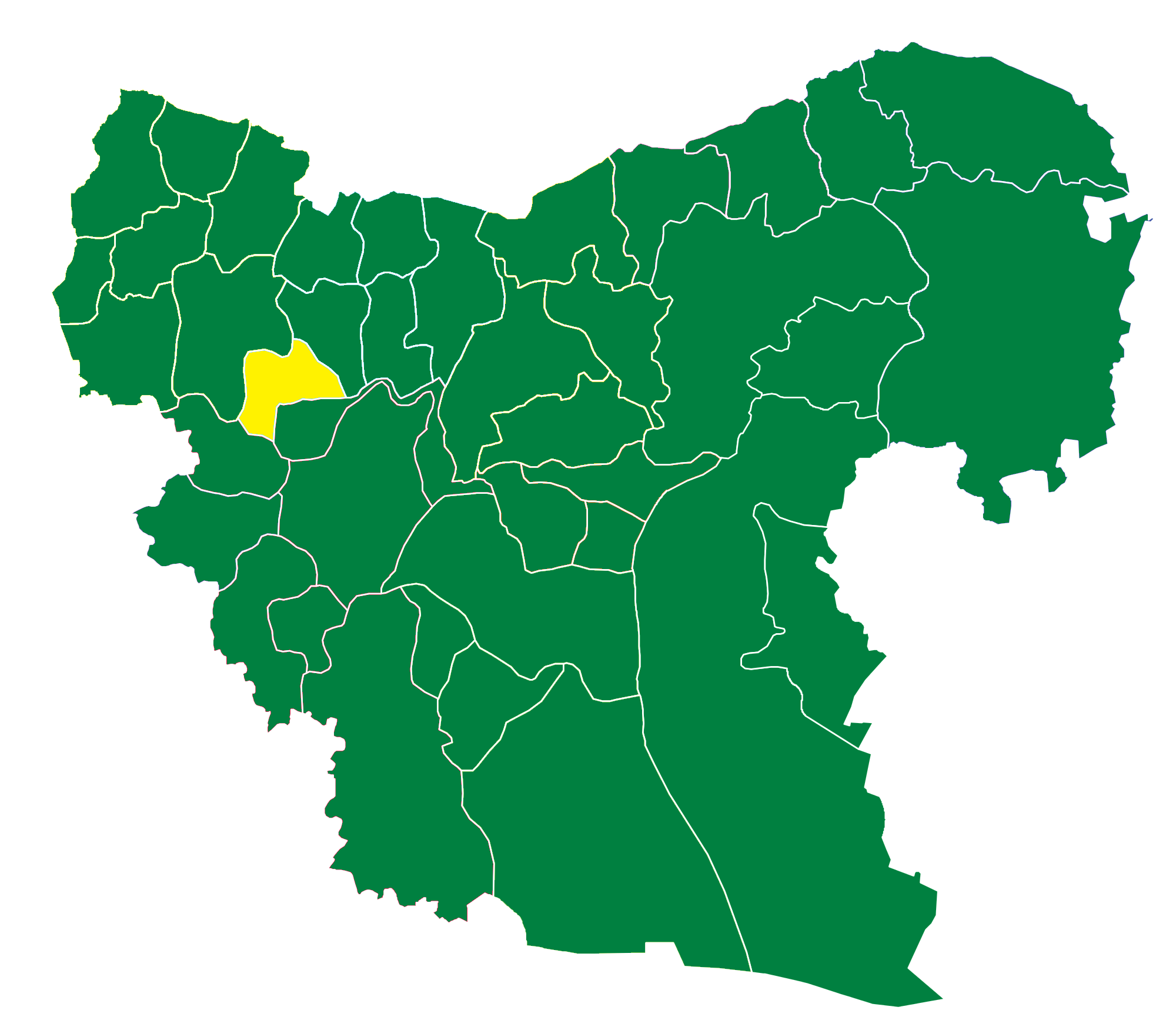
The administrative center of Nubl Subdistrict shown above is the city of Nubl.

The administrative center of Mare' Subdistrict shown above is the city of Mare'.

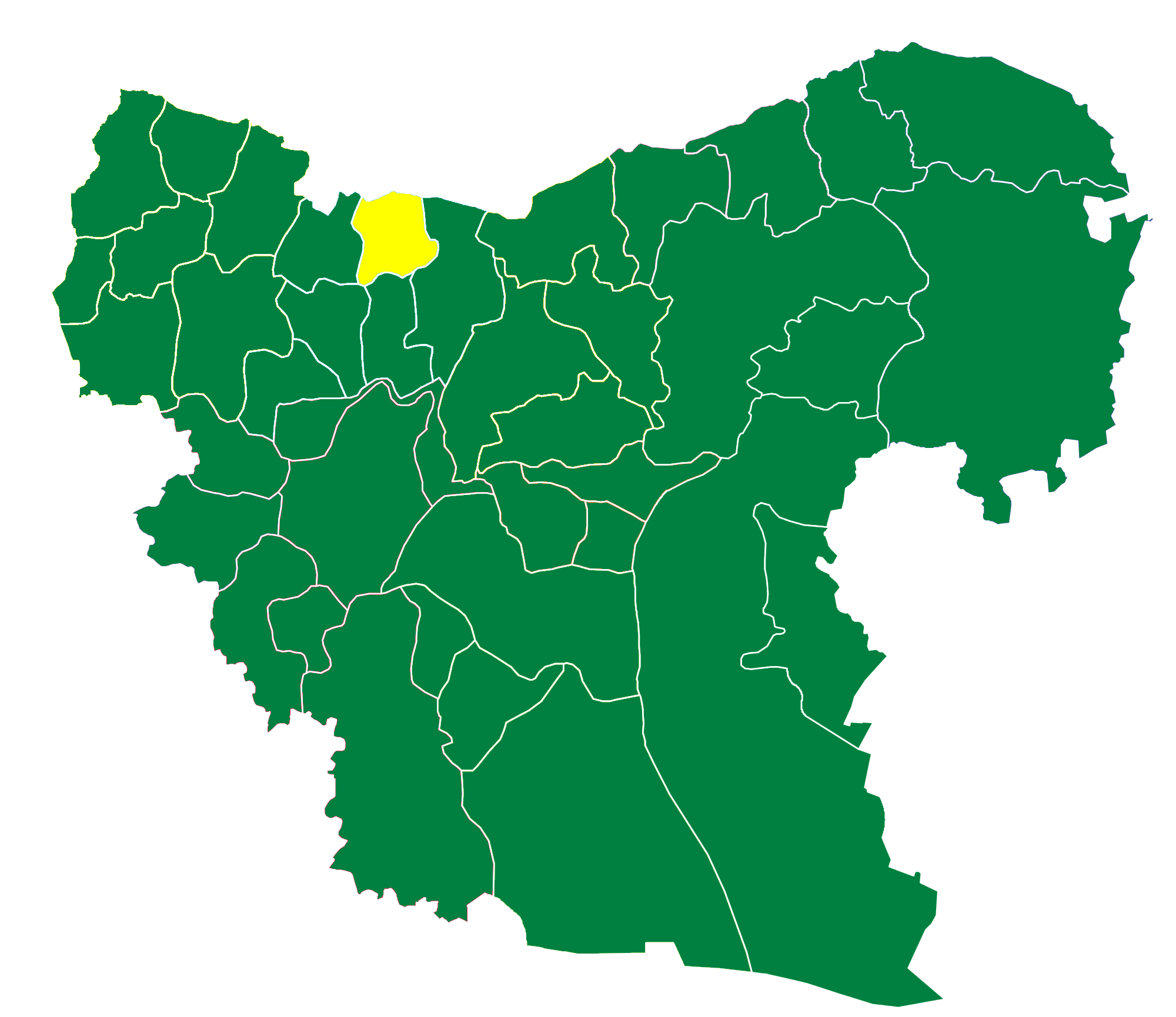
The administrative center of Sawran Subdistrict shown above is the city of Sawran.

The administrative center of Akhtarin Subdistrict shown above is the city of Akhtarin.

The district lies between Afrin District to the west, Mount Simeon District to the south and al-Bab District to the east. To the north is the Kilis Province of Turkey.

== Subdistricts ==
Subdistricts of Azaz District
| PCode | Name | Area | Population | Villages | Seat |
|---|---|---|---|---|---|
| SY020400 | Azaz Subdistrict | 180.12 km^{2} | 47,570 | 20 | Azaz |
| SY020401 | Akhtarin Subdistrict | 341.78 km^{2} | 39,385 | 43 | Akhtarin |
| SY020402 | Tell Rifaat Subdistrict | 204.52 km^{2} | 43,781 | 13 | Tell Rifaat |
| SY020403 | Mare' Subdistrict | 191.42 km^{2} | 39,306 | 18 | Mare' |
| SY020404 | Nubl Subdistrict | 174.79 km^{2} | 51,948 | 12 | Nubl |
| SY020405 | Sawran Subdistrict | 167.32 km^{2} | 30,032 | 18 | Sawran |
