= Turkish occupation of northern Syria =

Part of the Syrian Civil War (2016–2026)

Turkish Occupation of Northern Syria
- 2016–2026
- Both the Syrian flag and the Turkish flag were widely used in the zone

- Military situation on 19 February 2026; Turkish troops are still stationed in former occupied areas
- Status: Syrian territories under military occupation of Turkey
- Official languages: Arabic; Turkish (de facto)
- Government: Areas of the Syrian Arab Republic (caretaker and transitional governments) under military occupation (2025–2026); Areas of the Syrian Interim Government under military occupation (2016–2025)

Establishment
  - Established during the First offensive: 24 August 2016
  - Second offensive: 20 January 2018
  - Third offensive: 9 October 2019
  - Fourth offensive: 30 November 2024
  - All former occupied areas are under the Syrian government again: January 2026
- Currency: Syrian pound, Turkish lira, United States dollar

The Turkish Armed Forces and its ally the Syrian National Army had occupied areas of northern Syria from August 2016, during the Syrian civil war until 2026. Although these areas had nominally acknowledged a government affiliated with the Syrian opposition, in practice they constituted a separate proto-state under the dual authority of decentralized native local councils and Turkish military rule.

Turkish-controlled areas of Syria included towns such as Al-Bab, Azaz, Manbij, Jarabulus, Rajo, Tal Abyad and Ras al-Ayn. The majority of these settlements had been captured from the Islamic State and the Syrian Democratic Forces, both of which have been designated as terrorist organisations by the Turkish government. The Syrian Interim Government moved into the Turkish-controlled territories and began to extend authority, including providing documents to Syrian citizens. These areas are referred to as "safe zones" by Turkish authorities. The occupation has allegedly led to human rights abuses in some areas, including ethnic cleansing.

According to a report by the Institute for the Study of War, as of January 2026, the Syrian transitional government had fully taken control of the territory previously controlled by the Syrian National Army factions. Turkey still maintains military positions within formerly SNA-coded territory.

== Background ==
=== Turkey's proposals for its Safe Zone ===
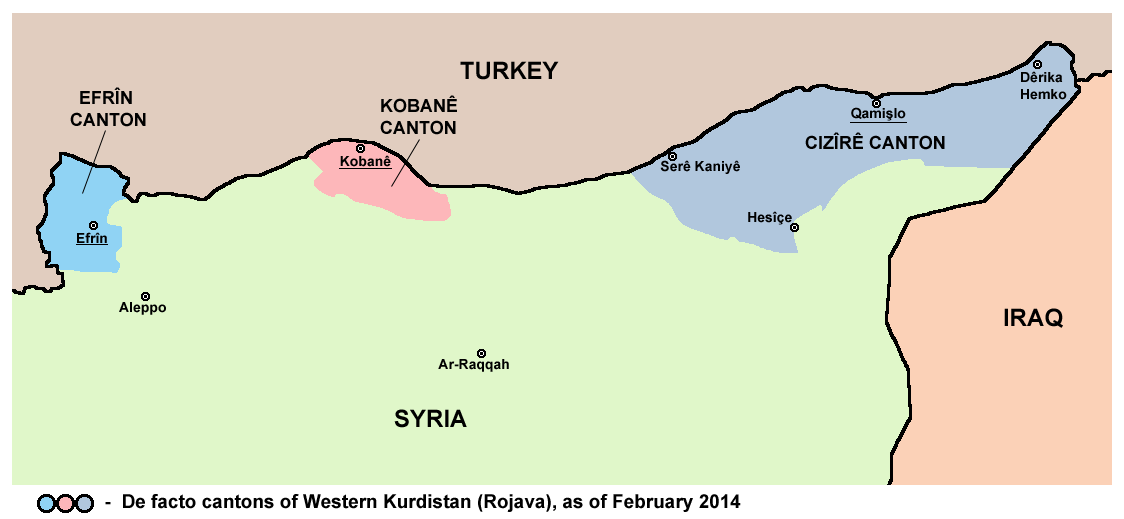
Situation in 2014. Turkey proposed to establish a safe zone in Syria between Kobane (pink) and Afrin (light blue) for several years.

Turkey and the Syrian opposition proposed the creation of a safe zone, that includes some regions of northern Syria as early as May 2011. However the United States and the other western states were not willing to accept these plans. After the 2014 advancements of ISIL in Iraq, Turkey and United States negotiated a 'safe zone', while US accepted 'ISIL-free zone', US officials were reluctant to accept a no fly zone.

=== European comments ===
After the attacks of ISIL in Syria, tens of thousands of Syrians fled to Turkey. In the beginning of 2015, refugees began to cross the Greece–Turkey border, escaping to European countries in large numbers. The huge refugee flow resulted in reconsidering the creation of a safe zone for civilians in Syria. In February 2016, Chancellor of Germany Angela Merkel said, "In the current situation it would be helpful if there could be such an area where none of the parties are allowed to launch aerial attacks – that is to say, a kind of no-fly zone".

=== U.S.-Turkish negotiations ===
The creation of the safe zone failed in early 2016 due to disagreements between the United States and Turkish governments, primarily on which actor is to be eliminated first. While Turkey wanted the Syrian government to be overthrown as soon as possible, the US prioritized the war against ISIL. The US also feared that the Syrian Air Force would bomb the area, which would make the idea of a safe zone impracticable. The government rejected the safe zone for being a safe haven for both civilians and rebels.

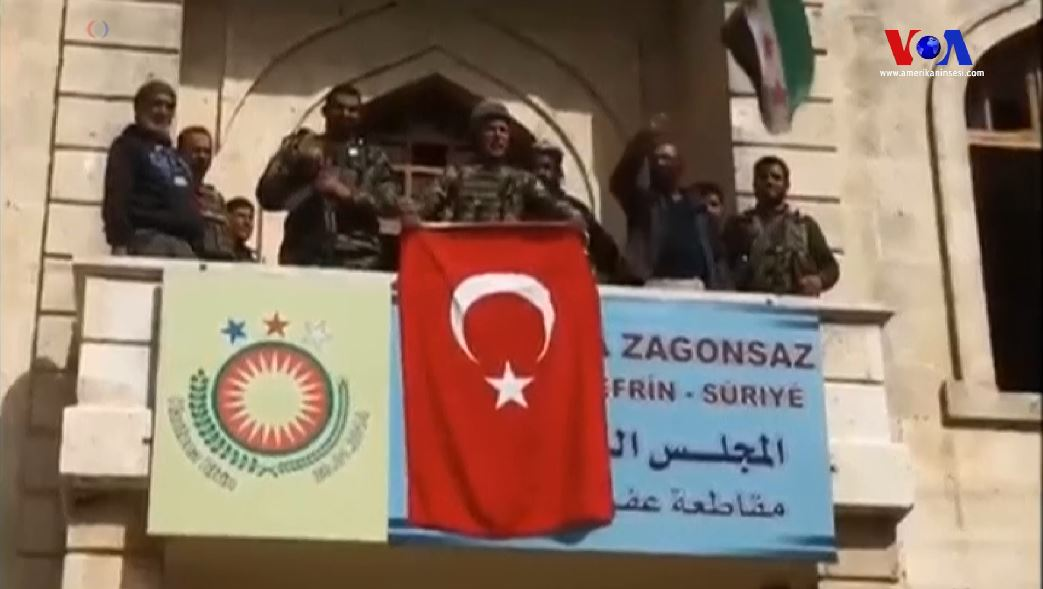
Turkish soldiers and Syrian National Army fighters at the building in Afrin that had hosted the PYD-led government of Afrin Region, 18 March 2018

The outline of the safe zone was another reason for the disagreement. According to Turkey, the safe zone should include a no fly zone, whereas the US rejected establishing a no-fly zone, which would bring a conflict with the Syrian government.

Turkey designates the Kurdish YPG to be a threat, due to its strong ties with the PKK. On the other hand, the US said that although they deem the PKK as a terrorist organisation, the YPG is a distinct actor, constituting one of the main allies of the US in its war against ISIL.

Another debate was about the name of the safe zone. While Turkey called the zone a 'safe zone from ISIS, the Syrian regime and YPG,' the US, however, declared that they will only accept an 'ISIS-free zone'.

== Turkish military offensives ==
=== Third offensive ===
On 30 March 2018, Turkey's president Recep Tayyip Erdoğan stated that Turkey had started preparations to clear northern Syria's "Ayn al-Arab" (Kobane), Ras al-Ain, Tell Abyad and Al-Hasakah regions from militants (referring to the mainly Kurdish YPG forces) up to the Iraqi border, adding that it would also clear militants from Iraq (this time referring to the Kurdish terrorist organisation, PKK).

On 7 October 2019, the President Trump ordered the withdrawal of US military troops stationed on the Syria–Turkey border. This withdrawal of military support was ordered by President Trump with the disapproval of the Pentagon and the US Intelligence community. The US president ordered the withdrawal of military troops under the premise that Turkey would not invade the region being held by Syrian Democratic Forces (SDF); however Turkey attacked the SDF within two days of US military withdrawal from the region.

Amnesty International reported attacks on civilian areas during the offensive, including incidents involving a house, a bakery and a school. On 12 October 2019, a Turkish airstrike near a school in Salhiye killed four civilians, including two children, and injured six others, according to a Kurdish Red Crescent worker interviewed by the organization. The following day, a Turkish airstrike hit a market and a civilian convoy travelling between Qamishli and Ras al-Ain. The Kurdish Red Crescent reported that six civilians, including a journalist, were killed and 59 others injured in the attack.

=== Idlib offensive ===
A cross-border military operation began on 27 February 2020 by the Turkish Armed Forces (TSK) against the Syrian Armed Forces and allied militias in the Idlib Governorate of northwestern Syria in response to the Balyun airstrikes which lead to the deaths of 34 Turkish military servicemen. Turkish Defense Minister Hulusi Akar said that the purpose of the operation had been within the framework of the Astana talks, to ensure a ceasefire agreement in the Second Northern Syria Buffer Zone and to prevent migration from Idlib towards the Turkish border. On 5 March, Turkey and Russia signed a ceasefire agreement in Moscow.

=== Possible fourth offensive ===
In May 2022, Turkish and opposition Syrian officials said that Turkey's Armed Forces and the Syrian National Army are planning a new operation against the SDF, composed mostly of the YPG/YPJ. The new operation is set to resume efforts to create 30-kilometer (18.6-mile) wide "safe zones" along Turkey's border with Syria, President Erdoğan said in a statement. The operation aims at the Tal Rifaat and Manbij regions west of the Euphrates and other areas further east. Meanwhile, Ankara is in talks with Moscow over the operation. President Erdoğan reiterated his determination for the operation on 8 August 2022.

=== Turkish offensive in 2024–2025 ===
Turkey and the Turkish-backed Syrian National Army (SNA) launched an offensive against the Kurdish-led Syrian Democratic Forces (SDF) amid the fall of the Assad regime. Beginning on 30 November 2024 with Operation Dawn of Freedom, the offensive aims to expand Turkish-controlled territory. Major battles include the 2024 Manbij offensive and the 2024 Kobani clashes, with ongoing fighting into 2025.

== Geography ==
The territory of the Turkish-occupied region is located within the northern areas of Aleppo, Raqqa and Hasakah governorates. On 26 February 2018, the territory connected with the mostly rebel-held Idlib Governorate.

The Syrian National Army captured an area of 2,225 square kilometres during Operation Euphrates Shield. Areas captured during the operation included villages between Azaz and al-Rai, such as Kafr Kalbin; Kafrah; Sawran; Ihtaimlat; Dabiq; Turkman Bareh; Kafr Elward; Ghoz; Ghaytun; Akhtarin; Baruza; Tall Tanah; Kaljibrin; Qebbet al-Turkmen; Ghandoura; Arab Hassan Sabghir; Mahsenli; Qabasin and Halwanji. Following Operation Olive Branch, Syrian National Army extended the region with the capture of the entire Afrin District. In addition to its administrative centre Afrin, the district includes settlements such as Bulbul, Maabatli, Rajo, Jindires, Sharran and Shaykh al-Hadid. According to the 2004 Syrian census, the district had a population of 172,095 before the war.

During Operation Peace Spring, Turkish Armed Forces and its allies captured a total area of between 3,412 square kilometres (1,317 sq mi) and 4,220 square kilometres (1,630 sq mi), and 68 settlements, including Ras al-Ayn, Tell Abyad, Suluk, Mabrouka and Manajir and cut the M4 highway. SNA forces captured 3 villages in the Manbij countryside shortly after the launch of the operation.

There are further intentions by the Turkish government to include the areas captured by the Syrian Democratic Forces during their offensive west of the Euphrates into the safe zone, which includes settlements such as Manbij and Arima.

== Demographics ==
Northern Syria, including the Turkish-controlled region, has historically been ethnically highly diverse, inhabited predominately by Arabs, Assyrians, Armenians, Kurds, Turkmens, Yazidis and Circassians. As of 2020, Arabs constituted a majority in the Turkish-controlled areas. Before the Turkish occupation, the al-Bab area had an Arab majority, while the Afrin area had a Kurdish majority. Tell Abyad was mostly Arab, while Ras al-Ayn had a large Assyrian population, with many Kurds as well. However, all these areas were strongly affected by refugee shifts and population movement due to the civil war, making accurate demographic estimates difficult. Great numbers of Sunni Syrian refugees moved voluntarily or involuntarily into these areas after the Turkish intervention.

The population of the Turkish-dominated territories is generally Muslim, with the Euphrates Shield zone as well as Tell Abyad being deeply conservative in regards to religion. There were some Christian communities in the later Turkish-occupied areas: A small Evangelical Christian community existed in Afrin, while Christians (mostly Syrian Armenians and Assyrians) lived in Tell Abyad and Ras al-Ayn. These Christians generally fled in advance for fear of reprisal.

=== Ethnic cleansing and kidnapping of women ===
After the Turkish-led forces had captured Afrin District (Afrin Canton) in early 2018, they began to implement a resettlement policy by moving their mostly Arab fighters and refugees from southern Syria into the empty homes that belonged to displaced locals. The previous owners, most of them Kurds or Yazidis, were often prevented from returning to Afrin. Though some Kurdish militias of the SNA and the Turkish-backed civilian councils opposed these resettlement policies, most SNA units fully supported them. Refugees from Eastern Ghouta, Damascus, said that they were part of "an organised demographic change" which was said to replace the Kurdish population of Afrin with an Arab majority. More than 200,000 people fled from Afrin District during the Turkish intervention by March 2018, while 458,000 displaced persons from other parts of Syria were settled in Afrin following the Turkish intervention.

A report of the Independent International Commission of Inquiry on the Syrian Arab Republic, submitted to the UN Human Rights Council pursuant to its resolution 43/28 for consideration at the 45th session of the Human Rights Council (commencing 14 September 2020), the Independent International Commission presents evidence of numerous human rights abuses against civilian population, and especially Kurdish civilian population, by the Turkish state and "non-state factions" such as the Syrian National Army, acting as de facto agents of Turkey. In paragraph 47, the Report addresses looting and property appropriation, noting that "[t]hroughout the Afrin region, multiple accounts indicate that the property of Kurdish owners was looted and appropriated by Syrian National Army members in a coordinated manner. For example, in September 2019, civilians in the Shaykh al-Hadid subdistrict (of the Afrin region) described how members of Division 14, Brigade 142 (the Suleiman Shah Brigade) of the Syrian National Army had gone from door to door instructing Kurdish families with fewer than three members to vacate their houses to accommodate individuals arriving from outside of Afrin."

It was reported that Yazidi and other Kurdish women and girls have been kidnapped by the SNA since the occupation of Afrin began in early 2018, either for ransom, rape, forced marriage, or because of perceived links to the Democratic Union Party. It was alleged that many of them were later killed. This activity has been interpreted as part of an Islamist policy of discouraging women from leaving their homes and to remove them from the civic activity they had been encouraged to take part in under the Autonomous Administration of North and East Syria, as well as part of a broader plan to discourage the return of Yazidi and other Kurdish refugees who fled Afrin in 2018.

=== Population centres ===
This list includes some of the largest cities and towns in the region.

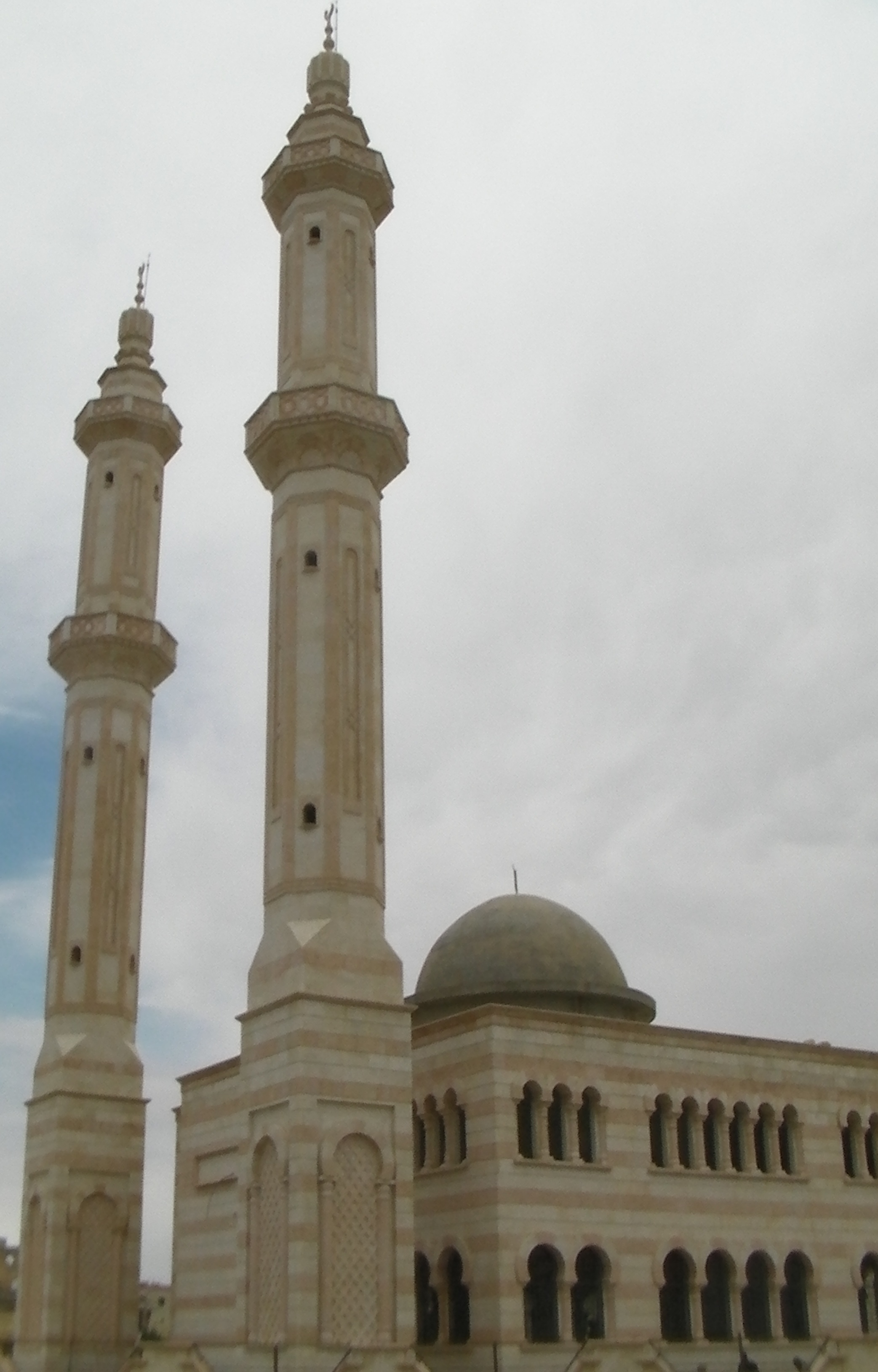
Mosque in Azaz

English name	Arabic name	Turkish name
Azaz	أعزاز (ʾAʿzāz)	Azez
Afrin	عفرين (Ifrīn)	Afrin
Jarabulus	جرابلس (Jarābulus, Jrāblos)	Cerablus
Akhtarin	أخترين (Akhtarīn)	Aktarin
Tell Abyad	تل أبيض (Tall Abyaḍ)	Tel Abyad
al-Bab	الباب (al-Bāb)	El-Bab
Ras al-Ayn	رأس العين (Raʾs al-ʿAyn)	Resulayn
Sawran	صوران (Ṣawrān)	Soran
Bizaah	بزاعة (B'zaah)	Bizza
Qabasin	قباسين (Qabbāsīn)	Başköy
Marea	مارع (Māriʿ, Mēreʿ)	Mare

== Politics and administration ==
The occupation zone is formally governed by the Syrian Interim Government, an alternative government of the Syrian opposition based in Azaz. Despite this, the area is governed by a number of autonomous local councils which work closely with Turkey. These councils operate as a "Turkish-European style government". In general, Turkey exerts a direct influence on the region's government, and Turkish civilian officials such as governors have been appointed to oversee the area. Turkish officials mostly act as advisors, allowing the councils to run the day-to-day government and collect their own taxes. Overall, Turkey is in the process of forming a proto-state in northern Syria, and regional expert Joshua Landis has said that the country "is prepared to, in a sense, quasi-annex this region" to prevent it from being retaken by the Syrian government. Turkish Minister of the Interior Süleyman Soylu declared in January 2019 that northern Syria is "part of the Turkish homeland" per the Misak-ı Millî of 1920.

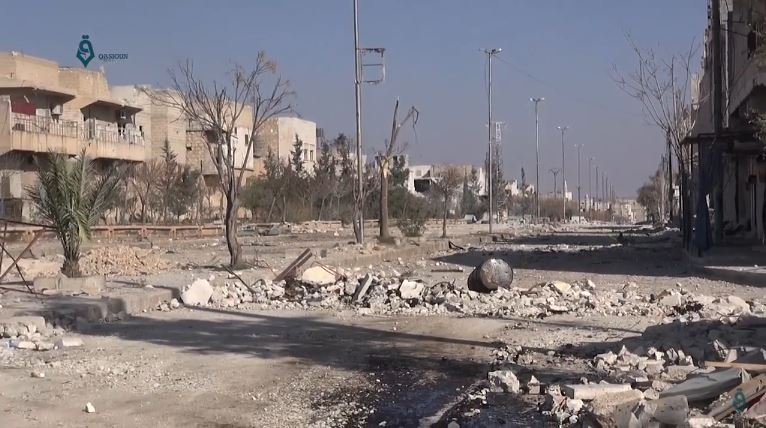
Since the start of its intervention in Syria, Turkey has striven to rebuild destroyed areas under its control (pictured: devastated neighborhood of al-Bab) and restore civil society.

Since the establishment of the occupation zone, the Turkish authorities have striven to restore civil society in the areas under their control and to also bind the region more closely to Turkey. As part of these efforts, towns and villages have been demilitarized by dismantling military checkpoints and moving the local militias to barracks and camps outside areas populated by civilians. However, some members of the military remain influential in the governance of the zone; for example, Hamza Division commander Sayf Bulad serves as de facto military governor of al-Bab since 2017.

Turkey also funds education and health services, supports the region's economy, and has trained a new police force. It has constructed a new hospital in al-Bab. Some locals describe these developments as "Turkification" of the region. However, many locals have accepted or even welcomed this, as they said that the area is better off economically, politically, and socially under a Turkish protectorate. The White Helmets volunteers entered Afrin region after Turkey occupied the area. For Turkish officials, restoring order and improving the situation in northern Syria was a "justice of fraternity" stemming from Ottoman times, as one deputy governor explained. The presence of Turkish soldiers prevents a Syrian government offensive into the area.

=== Local government ===
Following the conquest of Afrin District, civilian councils were appointed to govern and rebuild the area. A temporary council was organised by the Turkish-backed Syrian Kurds Independent Association in March 2018, to oversee aid, education and media in the area. It was later replaced by an interim council that was appointed in Afrin city on 12 April. The latter council, appointed by city elders, included eleven Kurds, eight Arabs and one Turkmen. While Zuheyr Haydar, a Kurdish representative who was appointed to serve as president of the council, stated that a more democratic election would take place if displaced citizens return, this has yet to take place. PYD officials have criticized the council and said it was working with an "occupying force".

On 19 April 2018, a local council was appointed in Jindires. During Operation Peace Spring, similar appointed councils were established in Tell Abyad and Ras al-Ayn. Turkish-backed administrators have refused to register people with Kurdish names, and insist that Christian and other minority women wear an Islamic veil before being issued documents. An August 2020 US Department of Defense report criticised Turkey and the SNA for "arbitrary detentions, extra-judicial killings, seizure and resettlement of new populations in private properties" and "the repeated and deliberate shutting off of water access to half a million civilians".

=== Military ===
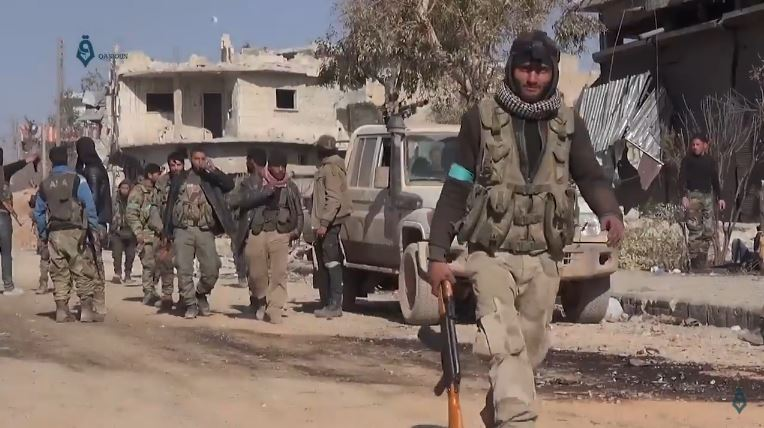
Fighters of the Syrian National Army in 2016

On 30 May 2017, the Syrian National Army (SNA) composed of primarily Syrian Turkmen as well as Syrian Arabs rebels operating in northern Syria was formed, mostly being a part of Operation Euphrates Shield or groups active in the area that are allied to the groups participating in the operation. The general aim of the group is to assist Turkey in creating a "safe zone" in Syria and to establish a National Army, which will operate in the land gained as a result of Turkish military intervention and answer to the Syrian Interim Government.

By August 2018, the SNA was stated to be an "organized military bloc" that had largely overcome the chronic factionalism which had traditionally affected the Syrian rebels. Military colleges had been set up, and training as well as discipline had been improved. Though clashes and inter-unit violence still happened, they were no longer as serious as in the past. A military court had been established in al-Bab, a military police was organized to oversee discipline, and local civilian authorities were given more power over the militant groups. Nevertheless, most militias have attempted to maintain their autonomy to some degree, with the Interim Government having little actual control over them. To achieve the formation of a new national army without risking a mutiny, Turkey has applied soft pressure on the different groups while punishing only the most independent-minded and disloyal among them. The FSA units in the zone have accepted the Istanbul-based "Syrian Islamic Council" as religious authority. SNA fighters are paid salaries by the Turkish government, though the falling value of Turkish lira began to cause resentment among the SNA by mid-2018. One fighter said that "when the Turkish lira began to lose value against the Syrian pound our salaries became worthless".

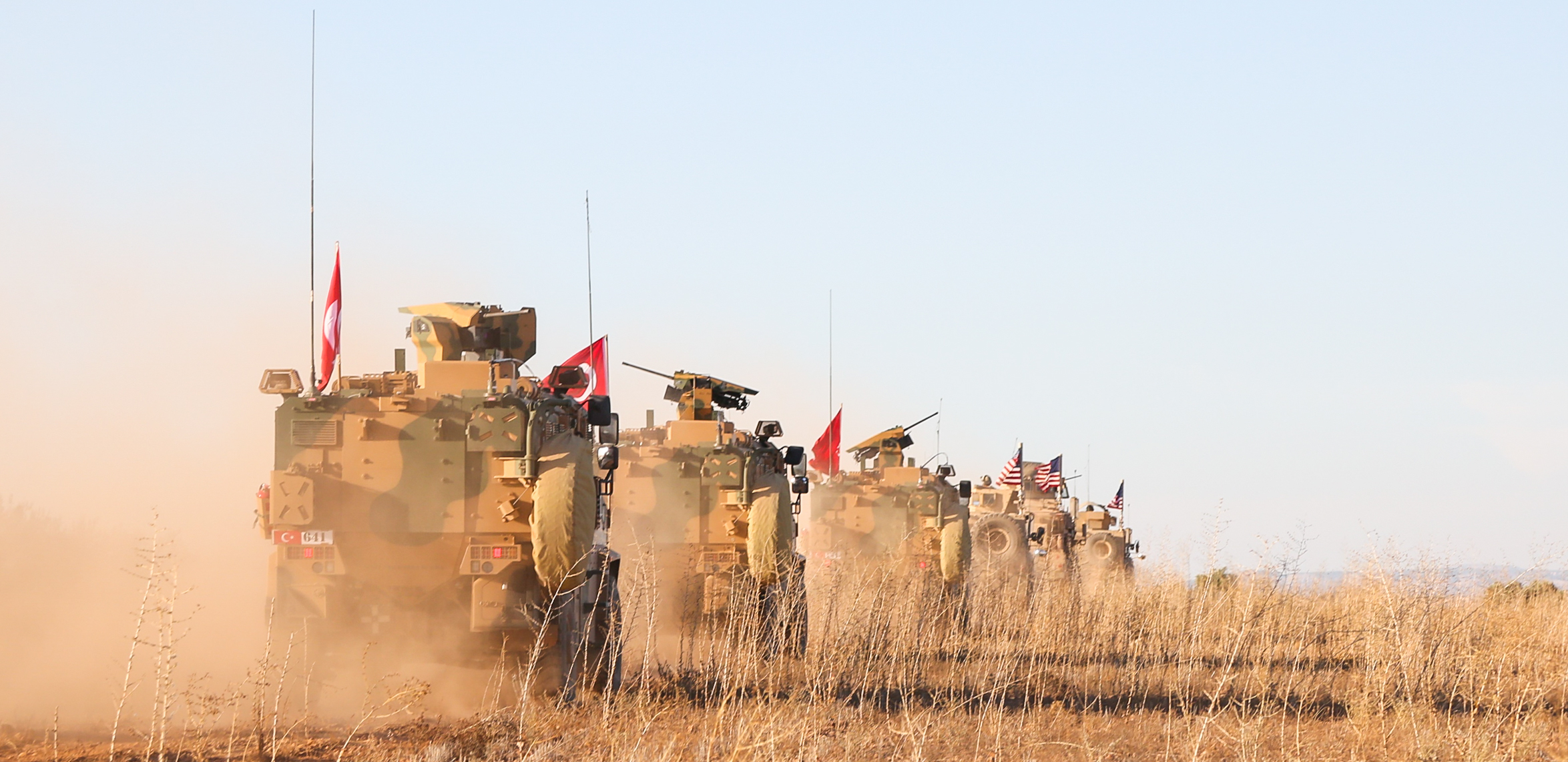
Turkish and U.S. soldiers conduct the joint patrol outside Manbij, 1 November 2018

By July 2018, the Turkish Armed Forces (TAF) have built "at least" six military bases in the zone, "raising concerns that [the TAF] may be settling in for a long-term presence in northern Syria".

=== Toponymic Turkification ===
After the establishment of Turkish control in the region, a number of streets, squares and villages have been renamed. Examples are the villages Kastal Mekdad, Kutana and the city of Ra'i, which are officially called Selçuk obası, Zafer obası and Çobanbey. The Saraya Square in Afrin bears the name Erdoğan Square. Signs with both Turkish and Arabic name stress the former with a bigger font.

== Law enforcement ==
Turkey has organized a new law enforcement authority in the zone in early 2017, the "Free Police" which is divided into the National Police and Public Security Forces. The Free Police includes both male as well as female officers. It is trained, equipped, and paid by Turkish authorities, and consequently loyal to the Turkish state.

The National Police, headed by Maj. Gen. Abdul Razzaq Aslan, is further divided into the Civil Police Force and the Special Forces. Most of the police members are trained in the Turkish National Police Academy. To maintain security in Afrin District, Turkey has also employed former members of the Free East Ghouta Police who had relocated to northern Syria after the end of the Siege of Eastern Ghouta.

In addition, Turkey has established several courts in the zone which employ Syrian judges and follow Syria's judicial code, while being overseen and supported by Turkish judges and prosecutors. A special "terrorism court" was established in Azaz, while a correction facility was organized in al-Bab.

== Economy ==
By July 2018, Turkey was playing an "increasingly prominent—and contentious—role in the region's local economy." It invested heavily in the zone, providing work opportunities and helping to rebuild the economy. Turkish-led development projects restored infrastructure such as dams, electricity and roads. Turkish private companies, such as PTT, Türk Telekom, the Independent Industrialists and Businessmen Association, and ET Energy launched projects in the area, as did a number of Syrian firms and businessmen. One problematic result of Turkey's economic influence was that the country's currency and debt crisis has also affected the zone, as Turkey pays salaries and services with Turkish lira whose value greatly dropped in course of 2018, harming the local economy.

=== Tourism ===
As result of the Turkish-led invasion, Afrin's tourism sector which had survived the civil war up to that point, collapsed. After open combat between the SDF and pro-Turkish forces had mostly concluded, Turkey attempted to restabilize the region and revive local tourism. It removed the tight control over visitors and passers that had previously existed under the PYD-led administration, and the new local councils and the Free Police attempted to provide stability and incentives for tourists to return. By July 2018, these measures began to have an effect, with some visitors coming to Afrin's popular recreational areas, such as Maydanki Lake.

== Education ==
Turkey has taken "full control over the educational process" in the zone, and funds all education services. Thousands of teachers in the zone are paid by Turkey. Several schools have been restored or newly built, with their curricula partially adjusted to education in Turkey: Though the curricula of the Syrian Ministry of Education still provide the basis, certain parts have been modified to fit the Turkish point of view in regard to history, for example replacing "Ottoman occupation" with "Ottoman rule". Turkish is taught as foreign language since first class and those who attend schools in the occupation zones can subsequently attend universities in Turkey.

== Aftermath ==
After the fall of the Assad regime, the Turkish controlled areas of northern Aleppo transferred to the Syrian transitional government in February 2025. Areas of Tell Abyad District and Ras al-Ayn District in Northeastern Syria have been under the administration of the transitional government since March 2025, but Turkish troops still remain. Military occupation in the rest of the Aleppo Governorate ended in March 2025, except for the Afrin District which ended in September 2025. By January 2026, all of the aforementioned areas are under the administration of the Syrian transitional government, as the remaining Syrian National Army was incorporated into the Ministry of Defense in 2025.

In May 2025, Human Rights Watch reported that factions of the Turkish-backed Syrian National Army continued to detain and extort civilians in northern Syria following the fall of the Assad government. In Afrin, residents said that a faction led by Mohammad al-Jassem imposed taxes on olive farmers and fines on families returning to the area. Between December 2024 and January 2025, the faction detained nine residents, accusing them of failing to pay the levies and demanding up to US$3,800 for each person's release. Human Rights Watch also reported that, despite the removal of most Syrian National Army checkpoints, some factions continued to operate from their former bases.

== Reactions to the occupation ==
=== Reactions within Syria ===
The Syrian government under Bashar al-Assad criticized Turkish presence in Northern Syria on multiple occasions and called for their withdrawal.

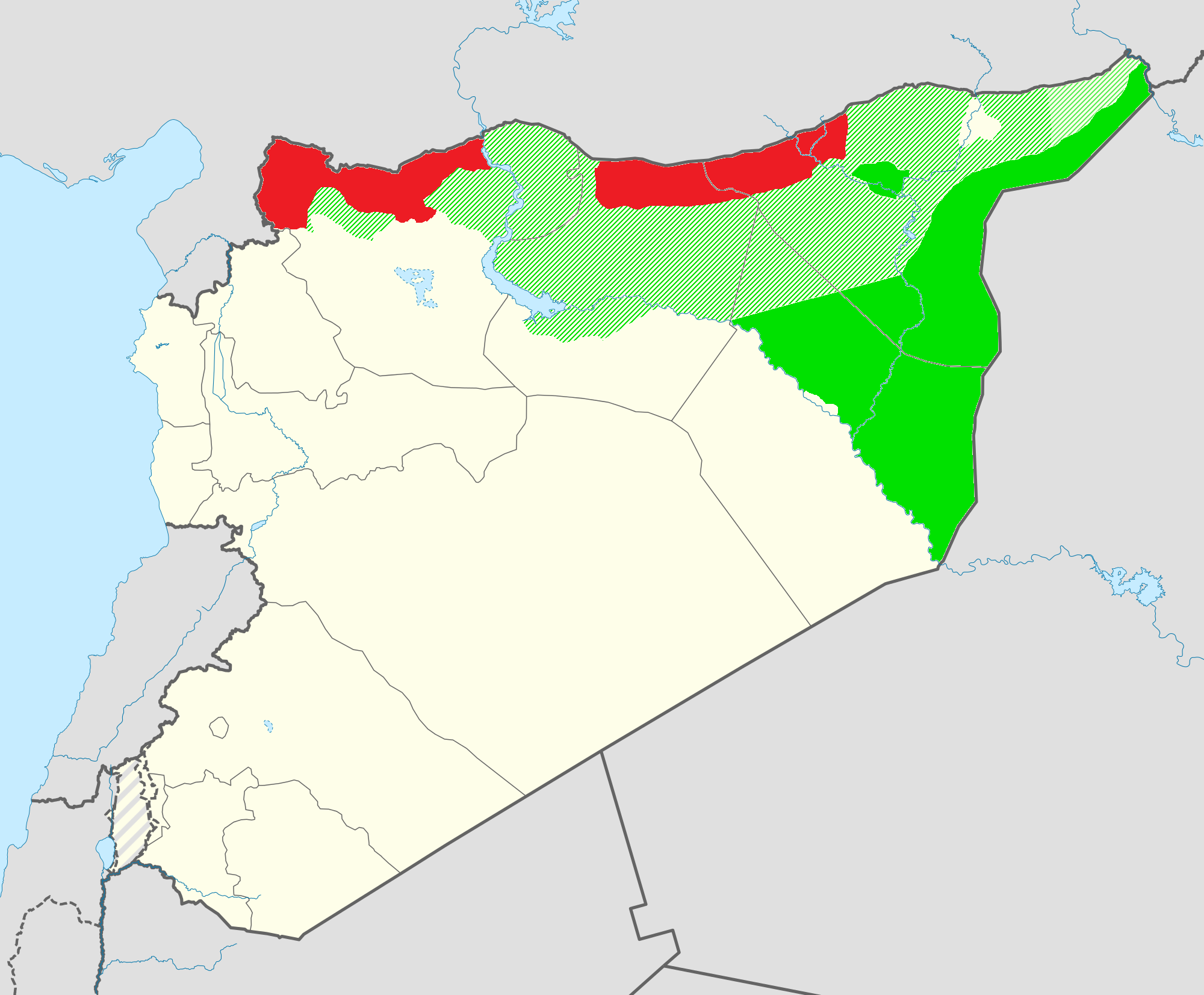
SDF-controlled territory (green) and Turkish-controlled territory (red) in October 2019

Syrian Opposition groups have expressed mixed, but generally positive opinions over the Turkish offensives. The Syrian Opposition Coalition expressed support for Turkish intervention and called for Turkey to help the Free Syrian Army launch offensives in the region. Other Opposition groups, such as Syria's Tomorrow Movement have condemned the intervention.

- (Democratic Autonomous Administration of North and East Syria) Democratic Federation of Northern Syria – On 26 August 2016, the Shahba region civilian council condemned the occupation of Jarabulus as a Turkish attempt to expand into Syria, likening it to the Battle of Marj Dabiq and suggesting that Jarabulus would become a "grave for the criminal occupier Erdoğan and his mercenaries".
  - (Kurdistan Region) Kurdish National Council – On 20 April 2018, the ENKS has called for the expulsion of Turkish forces from Afrin. On 2 July 2019, ENKS voiced its support for the establishment of an ethnically diverse local council in Afrin.
  - Democratic Conservative Party – On 28 May 2019 the Democratic Conservative Party condemned the occupation, stating that Turkey was attempting to annex Afrin.

=== International reaction ===
- Azerbaijan – On 20 September 2016, Qənirə Paşayeva, member of parliament, said that Turkey would have an obligation to protect the civilians in northern Syria from terror groups and would have the right to protect itself from the attacks originating from Syria with the intervention.
- China – On 29 October 2021, China's Deputy Permanent Representative to the United Nations, Ambassador Geng Shuang said "Since Turkey illegally invaded northeastern Syria, it has repeatedly cut off the water supply service from the Alouk water station" Also stating "China urges Turkey to abide by the international law, including international humanitarian law, protect civilians, maintain infrastructure operations, and guarantee humanitarian access for the UN".
- Cyprus – On 9 September 2016, the Cyprus House of Representatives unanimously adopted a resolution condemning "the unacceptable invasion of Turkey into Syria, under the pretext of war against terrorism." It also called on the international community to demand Turkey's withdrawal from Syria.
- EU – On 14 October 2019, following Turkeys' offensive the Council of the European Union released a press statement condemning Turkey's military action and called for Turkey to cease its "unilateral" military action in north-eastern Syria. It again recalled previous made statements by member states to halt arms exports licensing to Turkey and also recalled that it would not provide "stabilisation or development assistance where the rights of local populations are ignored or violated."
- France – On 30 March 2018, Macron assured the SDF of France's support for the stabilization of the security zone in the north-east of Syria, within the framework of an inclusive and balanced governance, to prevent any resurgence of Islamic State.
- Iran – On 31 August 2016, Iranian foreign ministry spokesman Bahram Ghasemi urged Ankara to quickly wrap up its military intervention in Syria, saying it was an "unacceptable" violation of Syrian sovereignty.
- Spain – On 14 October 2019 the Spanish Foreign Minister Josep Borrell Fontelles (also High Representative of European Union Foreign Affairs and Security Policy) in an interview stated that the 28 European member states "have unanimously decided to condemn...in strong terms what in the end is a military attack." Agreeing to also limit arms exports over its offensive in northern Syria, which Turkey "fully rejected and condemned" the decisions made by the EU regarding the issue.
- United States of America – On 7 October 2021, President Joe Biden's announcement stated "The situation in and in relation to Syria, and in particular the actions by the Government of Turkey to conduct a military offensive into northeast Syria, undermines the campaign to defeat the Islamic State of Iraq and Syria, or ISIS, endangers civilians, and further threatens to undermine the peace, security, and stability in the region, and continues to pose an unusual and extraordinary threat to the national security and foreign policy of the United States." thus extending the national emergency powers in Syria by another year.

== See also ==
- Hatay dispute
  - Hatay Province
  - Sanjak of Alexandretta
