= Ameriyeh =

Ameriyeh may refer to:

- Ameriyeh, Kerman, Iran
- Ameriyeh-ye Bala, Iran
- Ameriyeh, Idlib, Syria
- Ameriyeh, al-Bab, Syria
