= Qabtan =

Qabtan قبتان
- Village
- Location of Qabtan in Syria
- Coordinates: 36°31′34″N 37°21′48″E
- Country: Syria
- Governorate: Aleppo
- District: Azaz
- Subdistrict: Akhtarin
- Elevation: 470 m (1,540 ft)

Population (2004)
  - Total: 846
- Time zone: UTC+2 (EET)
  - Summer (DST): UTC+3 (EEST)
- Geocode: C1611

Qabtan (Arabic: قبتان, romanized: Qabţān) is a village in northern Aleppo Governorate, northwestern Syria. Situated on the eastern Queiq Plain, it is located 3 kilometres (1.9 mi) northeast of Akhtarin, some 35 km (22 mi) northeast of the city of Aleppo, and 14 km (8.7 mi) south of the border with the Turkish province of Kilis.

Administratively the village belongs to Nahiya Akhtarin in Azaz District. Nearby localities include Turkman Bareh 4 km (2.5 mi) to the northwest, and Ziadiyah 4 km (2.5 mi) to the north. In the 2004 census, Qabtan had a population of 846.
