= Kadrish =

Kadrish كدريش
- Village
- Location in Syria
- Coordinates: 36°35′02″N 37°20′40″E
- Country: Syria
- Governorate: Aleppo
- District: Azaz
- Subdistrict: Akhtarin
- Elevation: 472 m (1,549 ft)

Population (2004)
  - Total: 766
- Time zone: UTC+2 (EET)
  - Summer (DST): UTC+3 (EEST)
- Geocode: C1610

Kadrish (Arabic: كدريش, romanized: Kadrīsh; Turkish: Gidriş) is a village in northern Aleppo Governorate, northwestern Syria. It is located on the Queiq Plain, between Sawran and al-Rai, about 40 kilometres (25 mi) northeast of the city of Aleppo, and 8 km (5.0 mi) south of the border to the Turkish province of Kilis. The village is inhabited by Turkmen. Traveler Martin Hartmann noted the village as a Turkmen settlement in late 19th century.

Administratively the village belongs to Nahiya Akhtarin in A'zaz District. Nearby localities include Ziadiyah 3 km (1.9 mi) to the southeast, and Tat Hims 5 km (3.1 mi) to the northeast. In the 2004 census, Kadrish had a population of 766.
