= Ka'ibah =

Ka'ibah كعيبة
- Village
- Location of Ka'ibah in Syria
- Coordinates: 36°32′27″N 37°24′59″E
- Country: Syria
- Governorate: Aleppo
- District: Azaz
- Subdistrict: Akhtarin
- Elevation: 492 m (1,614 ft)

Population (2004)
  - Total: 572
- Time zone: UTC+2 (EET)
  - Summer (DST): UTC+3 (EEST)
- Geocode: C1609

Ka'ibah (Arabic: كعيبة, romanized: Ka‘ībah) also spelled Kaeebeh, is a village in northern Aleppo Governorate, northwestern Syria. Situated on the eastern edge of the Queiq Plain, where the Aqil mountains begin, it is located between Akhtarin and al-Rai, about 40 kilometres (25 mi) northeast of the city of Aleppo, and 9 km (5.6 mi) south of the border with the Turkish province of Kilis.

Administratively the village belongs to Nahiya Akhtarin in A'zaz District. Nearby localities include Ghurur 4 km (2.5 mi) to the west, and al-Burj 4 km (2.5 mi) to the southeast, in the northern Aqil mountains. In the 2004 census, Ka'ibah had a population of 572.
