= Baruza =

Baruza الباروزة
- Village
- Location of Baruza in Syria
- Coordinates: 36°28′54″N 37°20′56″E
- Country: Syria
- Governorate: Aleppo
- District: Azaz
- Subdistrict: Akhtarin
- Elevation: 494 m (1,621 ft)

Population (2004)
  - Total: 992
- Time zone: UTC+2 (EET)
  - Summer (DST): UTC+3 (EEST)
- Geocode: C1582

Baruza (Arabic: الباروزة, romanized: al-Bārūzah) is a village in northern Aleppo Governorate, northwestern Syria. 3.5 kilometres (2.2 mi) south of Akhtarin and some 30 km (19 mi) northeast of the city of Aleppo, it is situated on the southeastern edge of the Queiq Plain, where the Aqil mountains begin.

The village administratively belongs to Nahiya Akhtarin in Azaz District. Nearby localities include Ghaytun 4 km (2.5 mi) to the west, and Tall Tanah 2 km (1.2 mi) to the south. In the 2004 census, Baruza had a population of 992.
