= Tal'ar Sharqi =

Tell'ar Sharqi تلعار شرقي
- Village
- Location of Tell'ar Sharqi in Syria
- Coordinates: 36°34′49″N 37°24′15″E
- Country: Syria
- Governorate: Aleppo
- District: Azaz
- Subdistrict: Akhtarin

Population (2004)
  - Total: 525
- Time zone: UTC+2 (EET)
  - Summer (DST): UTC+3 (EEST)
- Geocode: C1594

Tal'ar Sharqi (Arabic: تلعار شرقي, romanized: Tell‘ār Shārqī) is a village in northern Aleppo Governorate, northwestern Syria. It is located on the Queiq Plain, between Akhtarin and al-Rai, and about 45 kilometres (28 mi) northeast of the city of Aleppo.

Administratively the village belongs to Nahiya Akhtarin in A'zaz District. Nearby localities include Tal'ar Gharbi 1 km (0.62 mi) to the west, and Weqfan 2 km (1.2 mi) to the east.

== Demographics ==
In the 2004 census, Tal'ar Sharqi had a population of 525. In late 19th century, traveler Martin Hartmann noted Tal'ar as a Turkish and Arab (Bedouin) mixed village of 20 houses, then located in the Ottoman nahiyah of Azaz-i Turkman.
