= Akhtarin Subdistrict =

Akhtarin Subdistrict ناحية أخترين
- Subdistrict
- Location of Akhtarin Subdistrict within Aleppo Governorate

- Location in Syria
- Coordinates (Akhtarin): 36.5297°N 37.3406°E
- Country: Syria
- Governorate: Aleppo
- District: Azaz District
- Seat: Akhtarin
- Control: Turkey (Syrian opposition) Syrian Interim Government

Area
  - Total: 341.78 km^{2} (131.96 sq mi)

Population (2004)
  - Total: 39,385
  - Density: 115.23/km^{2} (298.46/sq mi)
- Geocode: SY020401

Akhtarin Subdistrict (Arabic: ناحية أخترين, romanized: Nāḥiyah Akhtarin) is the easternmost subdistrict of Azaz District in the northern Aleppo Governorate of northern Syria, on the border with Turkey. Its administrative centre and largest town is Akhtarin. Its town of Dabiq is notable for the battle of Marj Dabiq in 1516, and its place in Islamic eschatology. Neighbouring subdistricts are Sawran Subdistrict (northwest) and Mare' Subdistrict (southwest), both in Azaz District, as well as al-Rai Subdistrict (northeast) and al-Bab Subdistrict (southeast), both belonging to al-Bab District. To the north is the Kilis Province of Turkey.

At the 2004 census, the subdistrict had a population of 39,385.

== Cities, towns and villages ==
Cities, towns and villages of Akhtarin Subdistrict
PCode	Name	Population
C1581	Akhtarin	5,305
C1579	Ziadiyah	3,576
C1597	Dabiq	3,364
C1602	Tat Hims	1,722
—N/a	Arshaf	1,546
C1605	Turkman Bareh	1,537
C1591	Dudiyan	1,164
C1606	Tall Tanah	1,148
C1614	Ghaytun	1,080
C1590	Taanah	1,062
C1582	Baruza	992
C1595	Tal'ar Gharbi	988
C1603	Ghurur	915
C1611	Qabtan	846
C1615	Wash	810
C1610	Kadrish	766
C1600	Jakka	755
C1577	Bahwartah	754
—N/a	Hameidiyyeh	707
C1608	Gheilaniyeh	689
C1607	Ghuz	685
C1599	Masoudiyah	660
C1601	Tall Battal	656
C1580	Aq Burhan	627
C1616	Qar Kalbin	618
C1578	Aziziyeh	614
C1609	Ka'ibah	572
C1585	Hardana	546
C1594	Tal'ar Sharqi	525
C1584	Ablah	517
C1604	Ein Elosud	366
C1598	Eskar	343
C1612	Qarah Mazr'ah	327
C1596	Samuqet	318
C1583	Bleikha	285
C1592	Tall Shair	285
C1576	Khalfatli	261
C1586	Dweir Elhawa	232
C1587	Oweilin	201
C1613	Qassajiq	194
C1593	Baghidin	33
