= Al-Burj, al-Bab =

al-Burj البرج
- Village
- Location of al-Burj in Syria
- Coordinates: 36°31′58″N 37°27′15″E
- Country: Syria
- Governorate: Aleppo
- District: al-Bab
- Subdistrict: al-Bab
- Elevation: 548 m (1,798 ft)

Population (2004)
  - Total: 236
- Time zone: UTC+2 (EET)
  - Summer (DST): UTC+3 (EEST)
- Geocode: C1192

al-Burj (Arabic: البرج), also spelled Borj, is a village in northern Aleppo Governorate, northwestern Syria. Situated in the northern Aqil mountains, bordering the Queiq Plain to the west, it is located between al-Rai and al-Bab, some 40 kilometres (25 mi) northeast of the city of Aleppo, and 12 km (7.5 mi) south of the border to the Turkish province of Kilis. On 7 November 2016, Al Burj was captured by the Syrian National Army from ISIS.

Administratively the village belongs to Nahiya al-Bab in al-Bab District. Nearby localities include Tall Battal 4 km (2.5 mi) to the south, and Ka'ibah 4 km (2.5 mi) to the northwest, on the Queiq Plain. In the 2004 census, al-Burj had a population of 236.
