= Ghurur =

Ghurur غرور
- Village
- Location of Ghurur in Syria
- Coordinates: 36°33′19″N 37°22′49″E
- Country: Syria
- Governorate: Aleppo
- District: Azaz
- Subdistrict: Akhtarin
- Elevation: 481 m (1,578 ft)

Population (2004)
  - Total: 915
- Time zone: UTC+2 (EET)
  - Summer (DST): UTC+3 (EEST)
- Geocode: C1603

Ghurur (Arabic: غرور, romanized: Ghurūr) is a village in northern Aleppo Governorate, northwestern Syria. It is located on the Queiq Plain, between Akhtarin and al-Rai, and about 40 kilometres (25 mi) northeast of the city of Aleppo.

Administratively the village belongs to Nahiya Akhtarin in A'zaz District. Nearby localities include Ziadiyah 1 km (0.62 mi) to the west, and Tal'ar Gharbi 3 km (1.9 mi) to the north. In the 2004 census, Ghurur had a population of 915.
