= Taanah, Syria =

Taanah طعانة
- Village
- Location of Taanah in Syria
- Coordinates: 36°23′09″N 37°19′40″E
- Country: Syria
- Governorate: Aleppo
- District: Azaz
- Subdistrict: Akhtarin
- Elevation: 504 m (1,654 ft)

Population (2004)
  - Total: 1,062
- Time zone: UTC+2 (EET)
  - Summer (DST): UTC+3 (EEST)
- Geocode: C1590

Taanah (Arabic: طعانة, romanized: Ţa‘ānah), alternatively spelled Tana, is a village in northern Aleppo Governorate, northwestern Syria. Situated in the Aqil mountains, some 5 kilometres (3.1 mi) southeast of the Shahba reservoir, it is located about halfway between Akhtarin and the northern outskirts of the city of Aleppo.

Administratively the village belongs to Nahiya Akhtarin in Azaz District. Nearby localities include Ablah 6 km (3.7 mi) to the north and Fafin 6 km (3.7 mi) to the southwest. In the 2004 census, Taanah had a population of 1,062.
