= Aq Burhan =

Aq Burhan آق برهان
- Village
- Location of Aq Burhan in Syria
- Coordinates: 36°29′52″N 37°23′07″E
- Country: Syria
- Governorate: Aleppo
- District: Azaz
- Subdistrict: Akhtarin
- Elevation: 485 m (1,591 ft)

Population (2004)
  - Total: 627
- Time zone: UTC+2 (EET)
  - Summer (DST): UTC+3 (EEST)
- Geocode: C1580

Aq Burhan (Arabic: آق برهان, romanized: Āq Burhān) is a village in northern Aleppo Governorate, northwestern Syria. Situated on the eastern Queiq Plain, it is located 5 kilometres (3.1 mi) east of Akhtarin, some 35 km (22 mi) northeast of the city of Aleppo, and 15 km (9.3 mi) south of the border to the Turkish province of Kilis.

Administratively the village belongs to Nahiya Akhtarin in Azaz District. Nearby localities include Qar Kalbin 2 km (1.2 mi) to the east. In the 2004 census, Aq Burhan had a population of 627.
