= Qar Kalbin =

Qar Kalbin قعر كلبين
- Village
- Location of Qar Kalbin in Syria
- Coordinates: 36°30′06″N 37°24′27″E
- Country: Syria
- Governorate: Aleppo
- District: Azaz
- Subdistrict: Akhtarin
- Elevation: 497 m (1,631 ft)

Population (2004)
  - Total: 618
- Time zone: UTC+3 (AST)
- Geocode: C1616

Qar Kalbin (Arabic: قعر كلبين, romanized: Qa‘r Kalbīn; Kurdish: Qar Kelbîn) is a village in northern Aleppo Governorate, northwestern Syria. Situated on the eastern edge of the Queiq Plain, bordering the northern Aqil mountains, it is located 6 kilometres (3.7 mi) east of Akhtarin, some 35 km (22 mi) northeast of the city of Aleppo, and 15 km (9.3 mi) south of the border to the Turkish province of Kilis.

Administratively the village belongs to Nahiya Akhtarin in A'zaz District. Nearby localities include Aq Burhan 2 km (1.2 mi) to the west, and Tall Battal 3 km (1.9 mi) in the Aqil mountains. In the 2004 census, Qar Kalbin had a population of 618.
