= Chitoi pitha =

Common rice cakes in Bangladesh and West Bengal, India

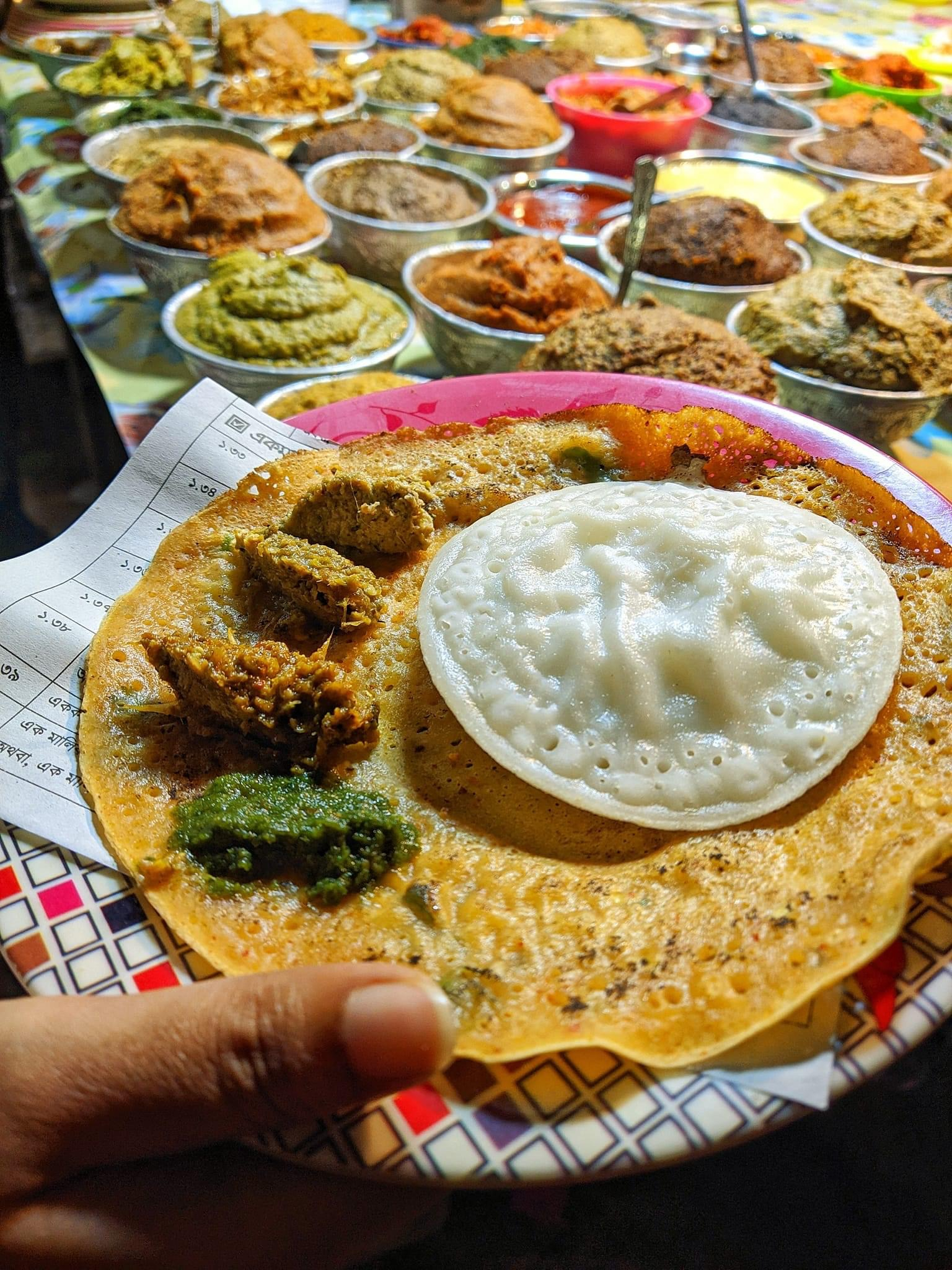
- Chitoi pitha served with varieties of bhorta
- Alternative names: Ashke pithe
- Place of origin: Bangladesh, India
- Region or state: Varendra, South Asia
- Main ingredients: Half-boiled rice powder and mustard oil
- Variations: Dim chitoi, pithe, chikui pithe and sora pithe

Chitoi pitha (Bengali: চিতই পিঠা) or ashke pithe (Bengali: আস্‌কে পিঠে or আস্কে পিঠে) is one of the most common rice cakes in Bangladesh and West Bengal of India. It is also known as Dhaka pithe, chikui pithe and sora pithe. Perhaps, the current spelling for 'Axse', has come in the form of ashke or aske because of local use. At the time of Paush Sankranti, the ashke pithe is prepared. The ashke pithe is usually eaten with molasses, but it is eaten with lentils, peas, fish curry of koi fish and meat curry. Historian Tapan Roychoudhury compared the ashke pithe to the beefsteak.

== History ==
The customs of making this rice cake in the house of Bengali in various religious festivals has come from the Middle Ages.

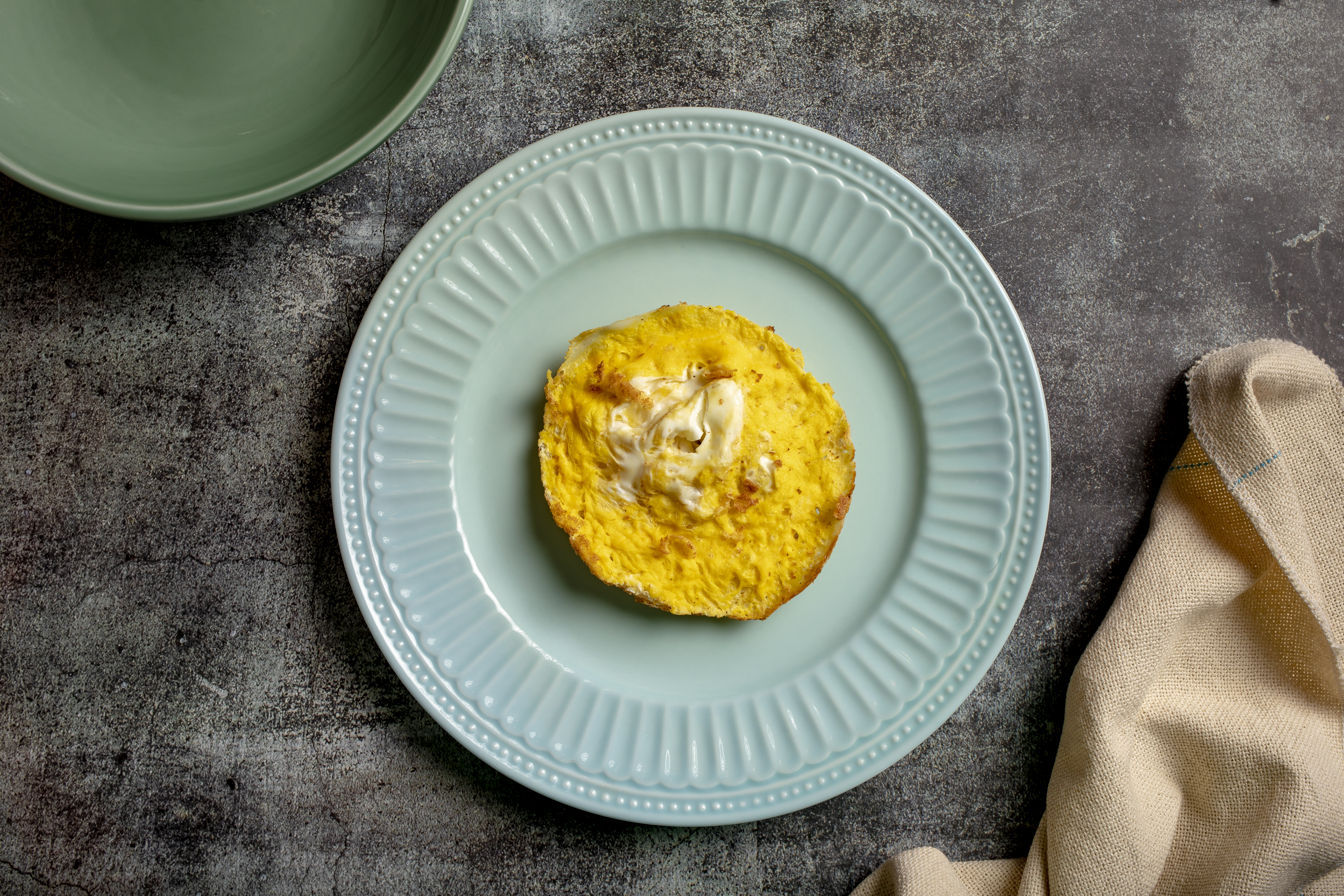
Egg chitoi pitha, Bangladesh

== Preparation ==
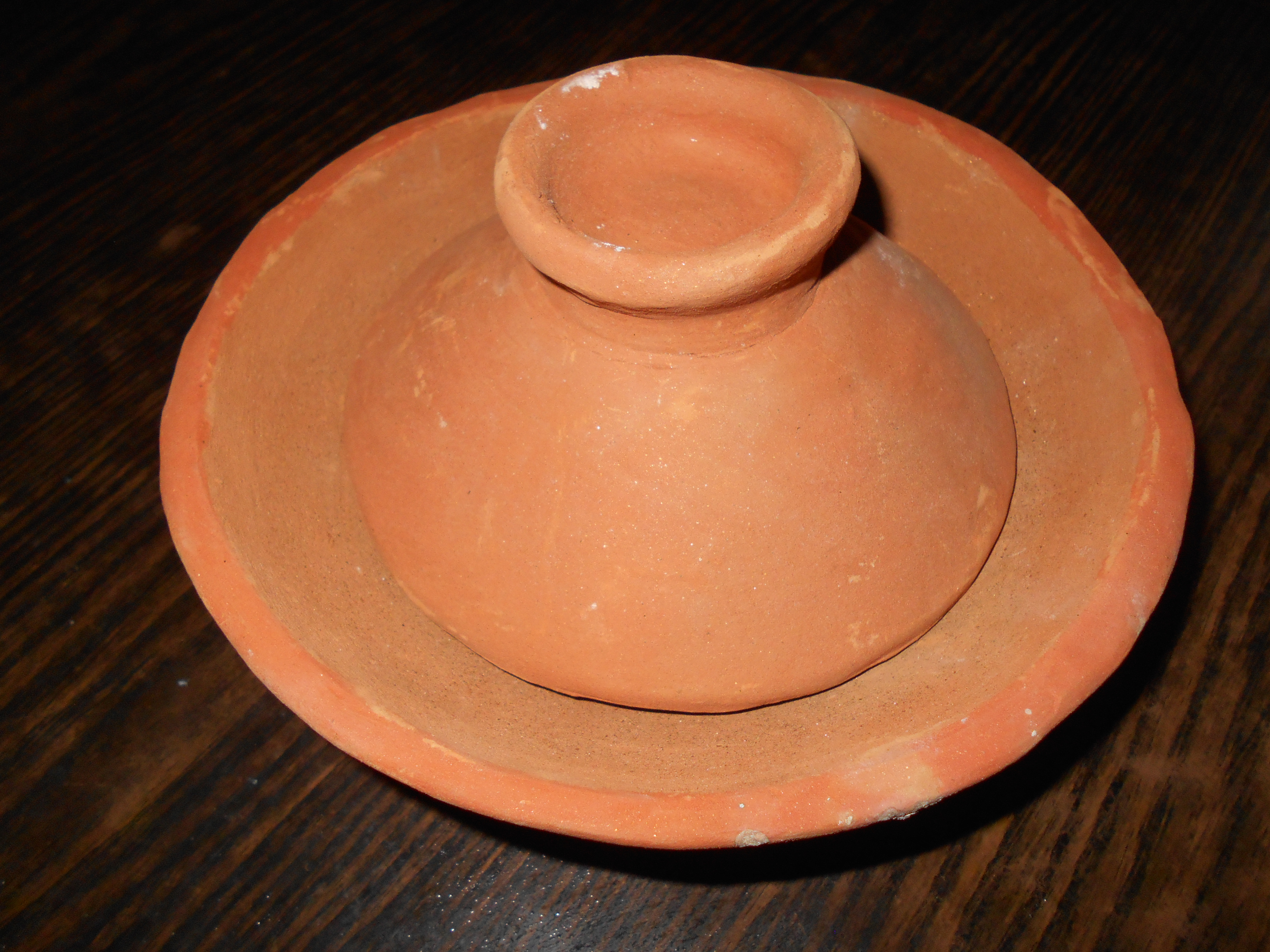
Sora, using for preparing Chitoi Pitha

The main ingredient for the Ashke pithe is half seasoned rice powder. Other ingredients are water, salt, and some amounts of corn oil. In the preparation for Ashke Pitha, it is usually used a special type of soil lid and to cover it from the upper side, a slightly smaller soil lid also used. At present days, the use of brass lid, and lower parts of the aluminum pot has begun to be used.

At first the rice powder is mixed with slightly hot water. A little salt is given in the mixture. Then the mixture of rice powder and water mixture is poured in the first lid using oil on its surface. The mixture is half of diameter of the second lid. After that, the second lid is covered with a mixture and the two lids are placed on the cooker. The lids are removed from the cooker after two and half minutes to two minutes later. At the time of making the Pitha, water is spread from the above. As oil is used below the lids, it can easily be removed with a knife. In this way, only one Ashke Pithe is prepared at a time. It is tasted fine to eat Ashke Pithe with molasses, or can be eaten after boiling by keeping it in the milk molasses.

== Gallery ==
Making of Egg Chitoi pitha

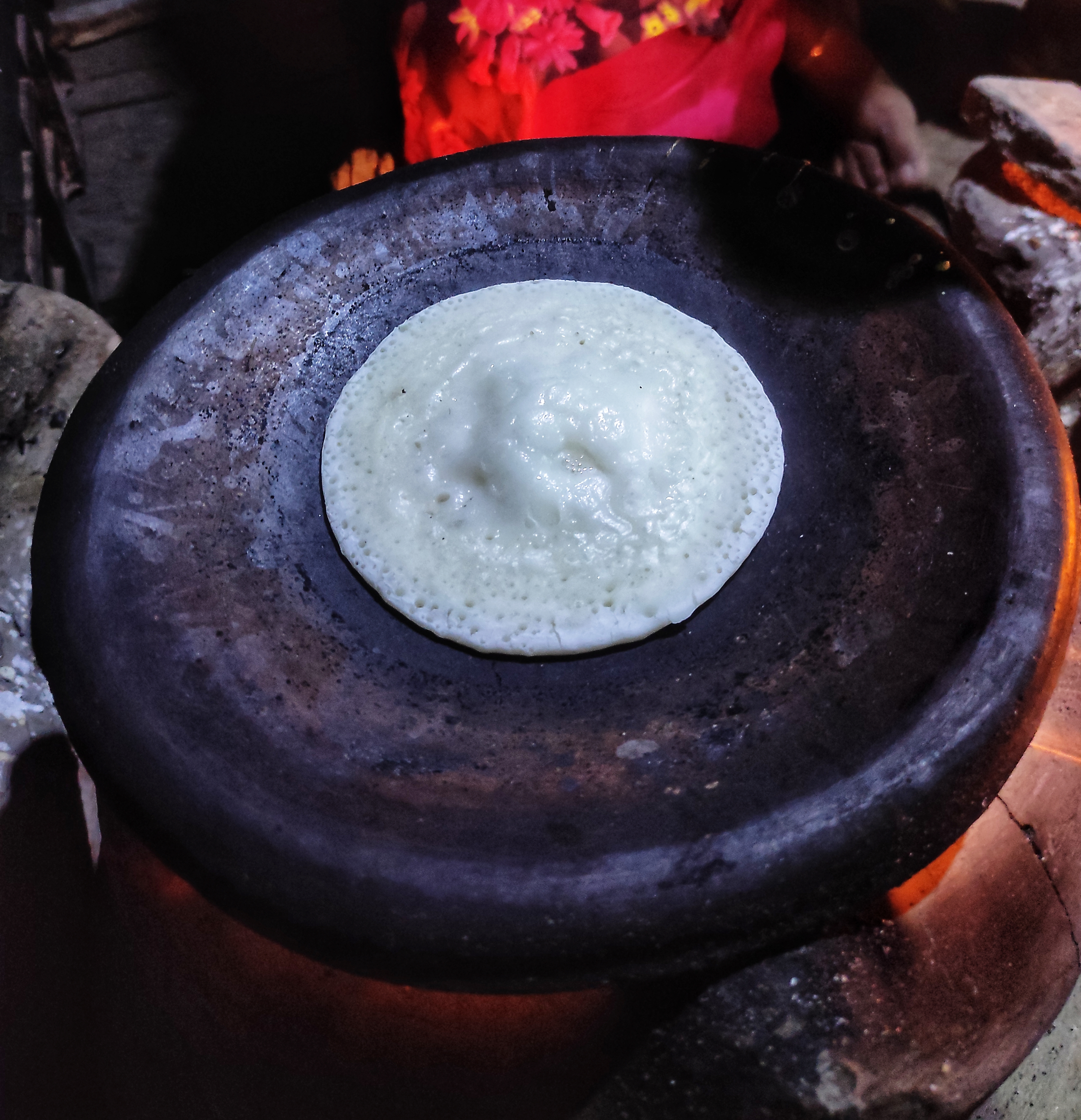
Chitoi pitha is being made in a Bangladeshi road side shop

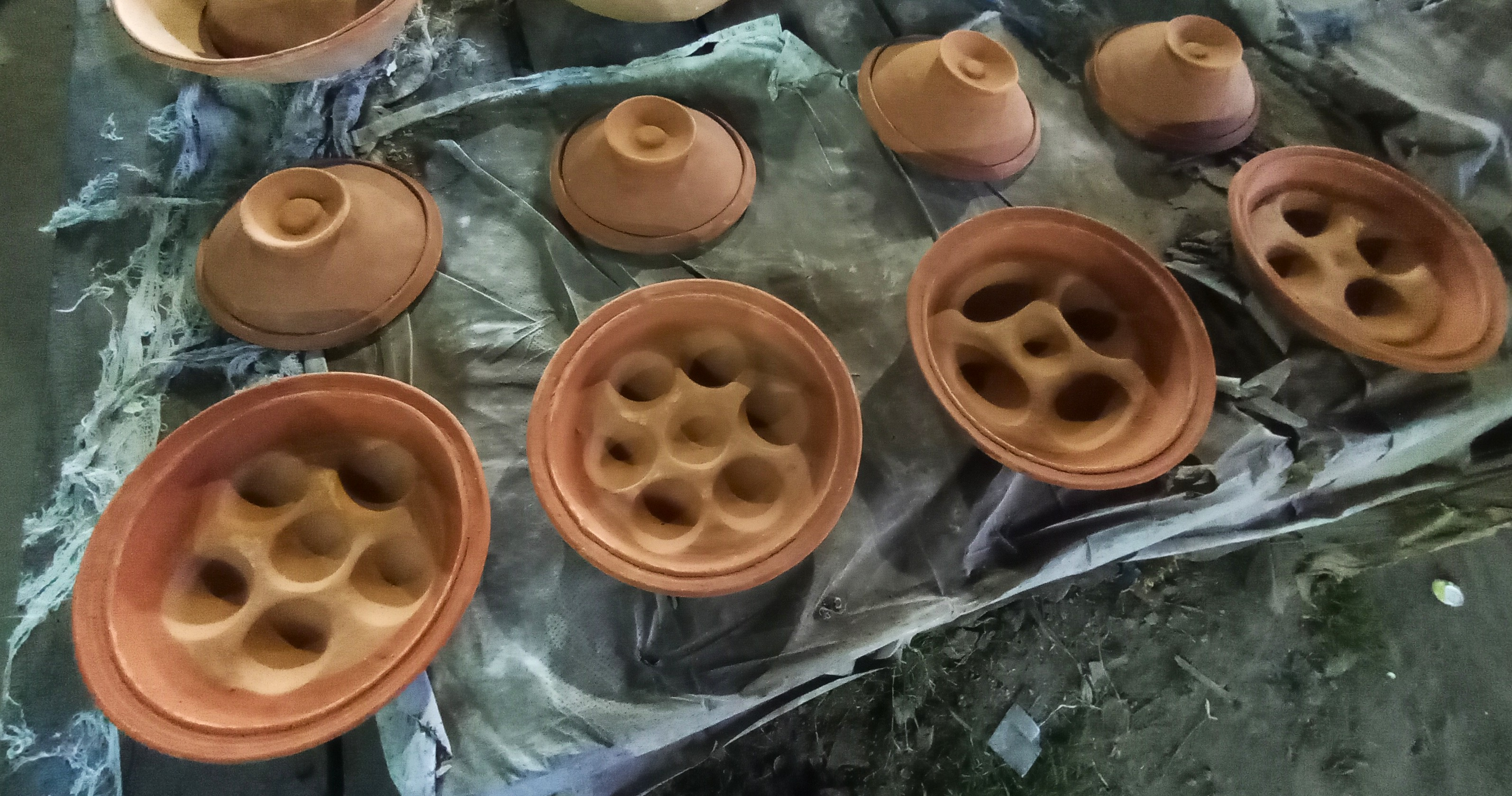
Terracotta molds for making Chitoi Pitha, Kolkata, West Bengal, India

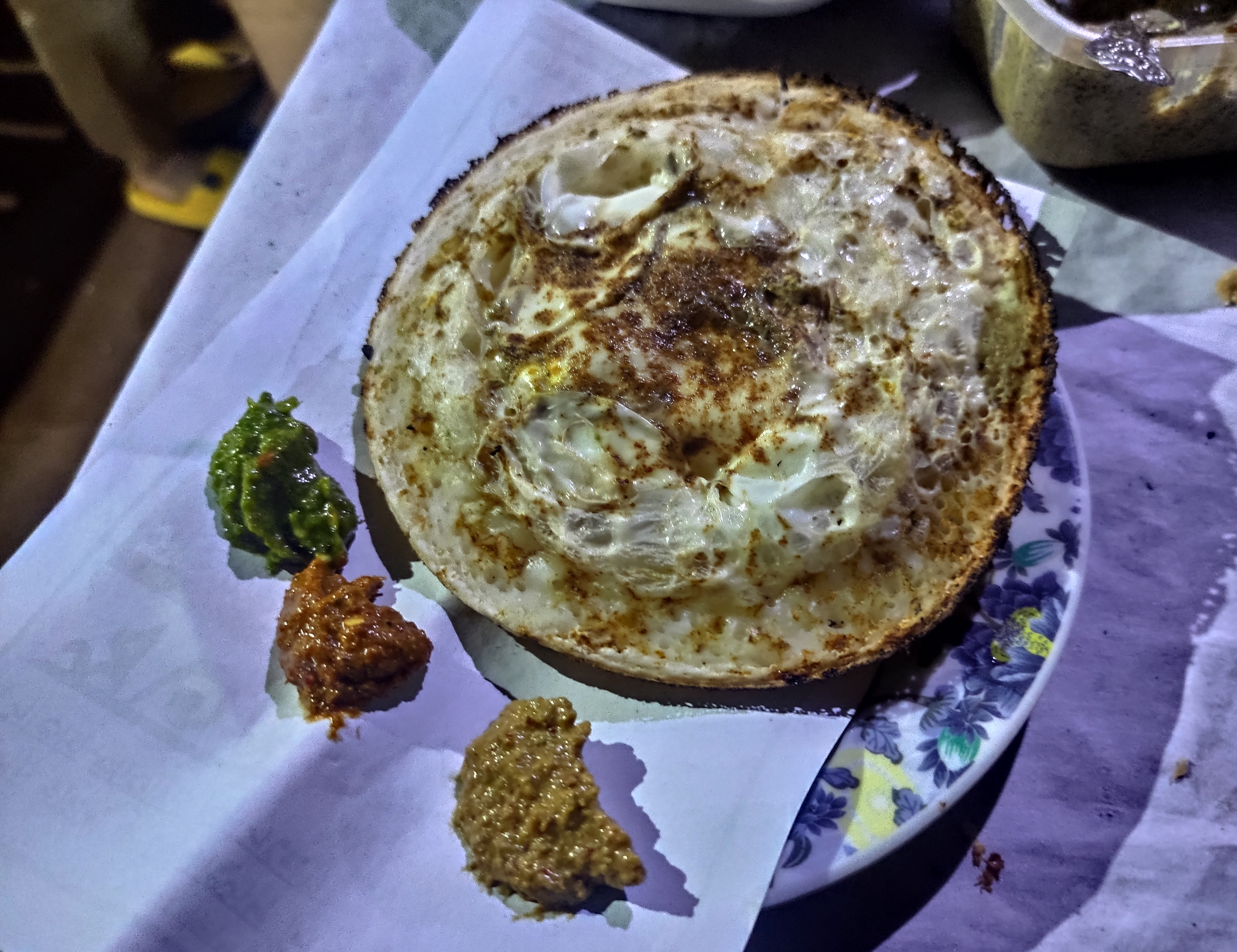
Egg Chitoi Pitha served with different spices in Bangladesh
