= Bahwartah =

Bahwartah بحروتة
- Town
- Location of Bahwartah in Syria
- Coordinates: 36°34′30″N 37°19′00″E
- Country: Syria
- Governorate: Aleppo
- District: Azaz
- Subdistrict: Akhtarin
- Elevation: 472 m (1,549 ft)

Population (2004)
  - Total: 754
- Time zone: UTC+2 (EET)
  - Summer (DST): UTC+3 (EEST)
- Geocode: C1577

Bahwartah (Arabic: بحروتة, romanized: Baḩwartah, also spelled Bhorta or Bahirta) is a village in northern Aleppo Governorate, northwestern Syria. It is located on the Queiq Plain, between Sawran and Al-Rai, about 40 kilometres (25 mi) northeast of the city of Aleppo, and 9 km (5.6 mi) south of the border with the Turkish province of Kilis. The village is inhabited by Turkmen.

Administratively the village belongs to Nahiya Akhtarin in A'zaz District. Nearby localities include Shuwayrin 2 km (1.2 mi) to the northwest, and Ziadiyah 4 km (2.5 mi) to the southeast. In the 2004 census, Bahwartah had a population of 754.
