= Tal'ar Gharbi =

Tal'ar Gharbi تل عار غربي
- Village
- Location of Tal'ar Gharbi in Syria
- Coordinates: 36°34′48″N 37°23′29″E
- Country: Syria
- Governorate: Aleppo
- District: Azaz
- Subdistrict: Akhtarin
- Elevation: 484 m (1,588 ft)

Population (2004)
  - Total: 988
- Time zone: UTC+2 (EET)
  - Summer (DST): UTC+3 (EEST)
- Geocode: C1595

Tal'ar Gharbi (Arabic: تل عار غربي, romanized: Tall‘ār Ghārbī) is a village in northern Aleppo Governorate, northwestern Syria. It is located on the Queiq Plain, between Akhtarin and Al-Rai, and about 45 kilometres (28 mi) northeast of the city of Aleppo.

Administratively the village belongs to Nahiya Akhtarin in A'zaz District. Nearby localities include Tal'ar Sharqi 1 km (0.62 mi) to the east, and Qantarah 3 km (1.9 mi) to the north.

== Demographics ==
In the 2004 census, Tal'ar Gharbi had a population of 988. In late 19th century, traveler Martin Hartmann noted Tal'ar as a Turkish and Arab (Bedouin) mixed village of 20 houses, then located in the Ottoman nahiyah of Azaz-i Turkman.
