= Mohammed Ali Yassin =

Syrian politician

- محمد علي ياسين - أبو البراء دابق

Member of the People's Assembly
- Incumbent
- Assumed office 1 July 2026
- Appointed by: Ahmed al-Sharaa

Personal details
- Born: 1981 (age 44–45) Aleppo, Syria

Mohammed Ali Yassin (Arabic: محمد علي ياسين - أبو البراء دابق) is a Syrian politician who is currently serving as a member of the People's Assembly since July 2026.

== Career ==
Yassin was born in the village of Dabiq in Aleppo Governorate in 1981. He earned a degree in Sharia from Damascus University in 2004, a diploma in Islamic Jurisprudence and its Principles in 2005, and a master's degree in Quranic Exegesis and Sciences in 2010.

After the Syrian Revolution, he helped establish the courts in Aleppo and worked there, becoming known by the nickname “Abu al-Baraa Dabik.”

He also lectured at several universities in northern Syria, including Al-Sham University in Azaz, Tripoli University, Aleppo University in the liberated areas, Gaziantep University in Syria, and the Bahçeşehir University.

In March 2021, he joined the National Coalition for Syrian Revolutionary and Opposition Forces as a representative of the 2th Corps of the Syrian National Army.

After the fall of the Assad regime, he was appointed, pursuant to Presidential Decree No. 66 of 2025, as a member of the Supreme Committee for People’s Assembly Elections.

He became a member of the Syrian People's Assembly as part of the president's list announced on July 1, 2026.
