= Northern Syria =

Northern Syria or North Syria may refer to:

- Upper Mesopotamia, which partly overlaps with northeastern Syria
- Northern governorates, of the Syrian Arab Republic
- Autonomous Administration of North and East Syria, self-declared autonomous region in Syria
- Turkish occupation of North Syria, joint Turkish-Syrian opposition held buffer zone
