= Arshaf =

Arshaf (ارشاف ) is a village in northern Aleppo Governorate, northwestern Syria. It is located at 37.14439 36.43264 on the Queiq Plain, northeast of Azaz, and 1 km south of Dabiq. The village has an irregular street layout but largely focuses on the main street running north–south. The village has seen sustained fighting in the Syrian Civil War.
