= Ablah =

Ablah عبلة
- Village
- Location of Ablah in Syria
- Coordinates: 36°26′01″N 37°21′20″E
- Country: Syria
- Governorate: Aleppo
- District: Azaz
- Subdistrict: Akhtarin
- Elevation: 518 m (1,699 ft)

Population (2004)
  - Total: 517
- Time zone: UTC+3 (AST)
- Geocode: C1584

Ablah (Arabic: عبلة, romanized: ‘Ablah; Kurdish: Ebla) is a village in northern Aleppo Governorate, northwestern Syria. Situated in a wadi surrounded by the Aqil mountains and some 6 kilometres (3.7 mi) northeast of the Shahba reservoir, it is located 10 km (6.2 mi) south of Akhtarin and some 25 kilometres (16 mi) northeast of the city of Aleppo.

Administratively the village belongs to Nahiya Akhtarin in Azaz District. Nearby localities include Tall Tanah 1.5 km (0.93 mi) to the northwest and Hezwan 5 km (3.1 mi) to the southeast. In the 2004 census, Ablah had a population of 517.
