= Dabiq =

Dabiq may refer to:

- Dabiq, Syria, a town in northern Syria
  - Battle of Marj Dabiq, between the Ottoman Empire and the Mamluk Sultanate in 1516
  - Battle of Dabiq, of 2015, on the List of wars and battles involving ISIL
  - 2016 Dabiq offensive, a military offensive and part of the third phase of Operation Euphrates Shield with the goal of capturing the town of Dabiq
- Dabiq (magazine), the online magazine used by the Islamic State of Iraq and the Levant
