= Tall Tanah =

Tall Tanah ثلثانة
- Village
- Location of Tall Tanah in Syria
- Coordinates: 36°26′43″N 37°20′37″E
- Country: Syria
- Governorate: Aleppo
- District: Azaz
- Subdistrict: Akhtarin
- Elevation: 496 m (1,627 ft)

Population (2004)
  - Total: 1,148
- Time zone: UTC+3 (AST)
- Geocode: C1606

Tall Tanah (Arabic: تلتانة, romanized: Thalthānah) is a village in northern Aleppo Governorate, northwestern Syria. Situated on the southeastern edge of the Queiq Plain, bordering the Aqil mountains, and some 7 kilometres (4.3 mi) northeast of the Shahba reservoir, it is located 8 km (5.0 mi) south of Akhtarin and about 30 kilometres (19 mi) northeast of the city of Aleppo.

Administratively the village belongs to Nahiya Akhtarin in Azaz District. Nearby localities include Talatayna 2 km (1.2 mi) to the north, and Ablah 1.5 km (0.93 mi) to the south. In the 2004 census, Tall Tanah had a population of 1,148.
