= Ghuz =

Village in Aleppo Governorate, Syria

Ghuz (Arabic: الغوز) is a village in the Akhtarin sub-district, Azaz district, Aleppo Governorate in Syria. According to the 2004 census, the village had a population of 685. It is a Kurdish village.
