= Haddabat =

Haddabat هضبات
- Village
- Location in Syria
- Coordinates: 36°37′20″N 37°29′27″E
- Country: Syria
- Governorate: Aleppo
- District: al-Bab
- Subdistrict: al-Rai

Population (2004)
  - Total: 387
- Time zone: UTC+2 (EET)
  - Summer (DST): UTC+3 (EEST)
- Geocode: C1273

Haddabat (Arabic: هضبات; Turkish: Edebet) is a village in northern Aleppo Governorate, northwestern Syria. Located some 4 km (2.5 mi) east of Al-Rai and less than 2 km (1.2 mi) from the border with Turkey, it is administratively part of Nahiya al-Rai in al-Bab District. In the 2004 census, Haddabat had a population of 387. The village is inhabited by Turkmen.
