= Tall Battal =

Tall Battal تل بطال
- Village
- Location of Tall Battal in Syria
- Coordinates: 36°30′01″N 37°26′21″E
- Country: Syria
- Governorate: Aleppo
- District: Azaz
- Subdistrict: Akhtarin
- Elevation: 539 m (1,768 ft)

Population (2004)
  - Total: 656
- Time zone: UTC+2 (EET)
  - Summer (DST): UTC+3 (EEST)
- Geocode: C1601

Tall Battal (Arabic: تل بطال, romanized: Tall Baţţāl), also spelled Til Betal or Tal Bital, is a village in northern Aleppo Governorate, northwestern Syria. Situated in the northern Aqil mountains, bordering the Queiq Plain to the west, it is located halfway between al-Rai and al-Bab, about 40 kilometres (25 mi) northeast of the city of Aleppo, and 15 km (9.3 mi) south of the border to the Turkish province of Kilis.

Administratively the village belongs to Nahiya Akhtarin in A'zaz District. Nearby localities include Tall Jurji 5 km (3.1 mi) to the east, and Qar Kalbin 3 km (1.9 mi) to the west on the Queiq Plain. In the 2004 census, Tall Battal had a population of 656.
