= Al-Rai Subdistrict =

Al-Rai Subdistrict ناحية الراعي Çobanbey
- Subdistrict
- Location of Al-Rai Subdistrict within Aleppo Governorate

- Location in Syria
- Coordinates (al-Rai): 36.6172°N 37.5458°E
- Country: Syria
- Governorate: Aleppo
- District: al-Bab
- Seat: al-Rai

Area
  - Total: 352.3 km^{2} (136.0 sq mi)

Population (2004)
  - Total: 15,378
  - Density: 43.65/km^{2} (113.1/sq mi)
- Geocode: SY020202

Al-Rai Subdistrict (Arabic: ناحية الراعي) is a subdistrict of al-Bab District in northern Aleppo Governorate, northwestern Syria. Administrative centre is al-Rai. At the 2004 census, the subdistrict had a population of 15,378. Most of the settlements in the subdistrict are populated by Syrian Turkmen.

Neighbouring subdistricts are al-Bab Subdistrict (southwest) and Arima Subdistrict (southeast), both in al-Bab District, as well as Akhtarin Subdistrict (west) in Azaz District, and Ghandoura Subdistrict (east) belonging to Jarabulus District. To the north is the Kilis Province of Turkey.

== Cities, towns and villages ==
Cities, towns and villages of al-Rai Subdistrict
PCode	Name	Population
C1250	al-Rai	4,609
C1253	Haji Kusa	1,011
C1247	al-Waqf	902
C1260	Ameriyeh	881
C1255	Shawa	791
C1269	Tal Elhawa	774
C1254	Misannah Bab	610
C1270	Ayyasha	468
C1275	Qantarah, al-Bab	465
C1273	Haddabat	387
C1264	Atharia	374
C1251	Hleisa	372
C1265	Um Elthadaya Mamli	326
C1258	Tal Mizab	315
C1274	Karsanli	298
C1248	Sandi	298
C1259	Tweiran	283
C1249	Matmana	266
C1257	Nahda	264
C1267	Tal Eisheh	250
C1262	Khalilieyh	247
C1266	Zalaf	240
C1252	Haji Wali	187
C1272	Bab Laymun	143
C1268	Zyaret Elbab	140
C1271	Alıcı Köyü	128
C1263	Tlilet Elbab	126
C1261	Silsileh	119
C1256	Jbine	104
