= Haji Kusa =

Haji Kusa حاجي كوسة
- Village
- Location of Haji Kusa in Syria
- Coordinates: 36°33′20″N 37°38′20″E
- Country: Syria
- Governorate: Aleppo
- District: al-Bab
- Subdistrict: al-Rai

Population (2004)
  - Total: 1,011
- Time zone: UTC+2 (EET)
  - Summer (DST): UTC+3 (EEST)
- Geocode: C1253

Haji Kusa (Arabic: حاجي كوسة; Turkish: Hacı Köse, lit. 'beardless pilgrim') is a village in northern Aleppo Governorate, northern Syria. It is located in a sparsely populated area, some 18 km (11 mi) east of al-Rai, 22 km (14 mi) northeast of al-Bab and 27 km (17 mi) west of Manbij. Administratively part of Nahiya al-Rai in al-Bab District, the village is inhabited by Turkmen and had a population of 1,011 as per the 2004 census. On 12 November 2016, Haji Kusa was captured by the Syrian National Army from ISIS.
