= Tat Hims =

Tat Hims طاط حمس
- Village
- Location of Tat Hims in Syria
- Coordinates: 36°37′05″N 37°22′38″E
- Country: Syria
- Governorate: Aleppo
- District: Azaz
- Subdistrict: Akhtarin
- Elevation: 481 m (1,578 ft)

Population (2004)
  - Total: 1,722
- Time zone: UTC+2 (EET)
  - Summer (DST): UTC+3 (EEST)
- Geocode: C1602

Tat Hims (Arabic: طاط حمس), alternatively spelled Tathumus, is a village in northern Aleppo Governorate, northwestern Syria. About 45 kilometres (28 mi) northeast of the city of Aleppo and just about 4 km (2.5 mi) south of Syria's border with Turkey, it is administratively part of Nahiya Akhtarin of Azaz District. Nearby localities include Qantarah 1 km (0.62 mi) to the south and al-Rai 6 km (3.7 mi) to the east. In the 2004 census, Tat Hims had a population of 1,722.
