= Ameriyeh, al-Bab =

Al-Ameriyyah
- Village
- Location of Al-Ameriyyah in Syria
- Coordinates: 36°34′03″N 37°30′56″E
- Country: Syria
- Governorate: Aleppo
- District: al-Bab
- Subdistrict: al-Rai

Population (2004)
  - Total: 881
- Time zone: UTC+2 (EET)
  - Summer (DST): UTC+3 (EEST)
- Geocode: C1260

Ameriyeh (Arabic: عامرية, romanized: Al-Amerīyyāh) or El Amiriye (Arabic: العامرية, romanized: Al-Amerīyyāh) is a village in northern Aleppo Governorate, northwestern Syria. Located some 8 km (5.0 mi) southeast of al-Rai and the border with Turkey, it is administratively part of Nahiya al-Rai in al-Bab District. In the 2004 census, Ameriyeh had a population of 881. The village is inhabited by Turkmen.
