= Al-Waqf, Syria =

al-Waqf الوقف
- Village
- Location of al-Waqf in Syria
- Coordinates: 36°35′08″N 37°25′35″E
- Country: Syria
- Governorate: Aleppo
- District: al-Bab
- Subdistrict: al-Rai

Population (2004)
  - Total: 902
- Time zone: UTC+2 (EET)
  - Summer (DST): UTC+3 (EEST)
- Geocode: C1247

al-Waqf (Arabic: الوقف; Turkish: Ufuk) is a village in northern Aleppo Governorate, northern Syria. Located some 3 km (1.9 mi) southwest of al-Rai, it is administratively part of Nahiya al-Rai in al-Bab District and has a population of 902 as per the 2004 census. The village is inhabited by Turkmen.
