= Ziadiyah =

Ziadiyah زيادية
- Town
- Location of Ziadiyah in Syria
- Coordinates: 36°33′23″N 37°21′52″E
- Country: Syria
- Governorate: Aleppo
- District: Azaz
- Subdistrict: Akhtarin
- Elevation: 478 m (1,568 ft)

Population (2004)
  - Total: 3,576
- Time zone: UTC+2 (EET)
  - Summer (DST): UTC+3 (EEST)
- Geocode: C1579

Ziadiyah (Arabic: زيادية, romanized: az-Ziyādīyah) is a town in northern Aleppo Governorate, northwestern Syria. It is located on the Queiq Plain, between Akhtarin and al-Rai, about 40 kilometres (25 mi) northeast of the city of Aleppo, and 10 km (6.2 mi) south of the border to the Turkish province of Kilis.

Administratively the town belongs to Nahiya Akhtarin in A'zaz District. Nearby localities include Ghurur 1 km (0.62 mi) to the east, and Turkman Bareh 4 km (2.5 mi) to the southwest. In the 2004 census, Ziadiyah had a population of 3,576.
