= Turkman Bareh =

Turkman Bareh تركمان بارح
- Town
- Location of Turkman Bareh in Syria
- Coordinates: 36°32′32″N 37°19′29″E
- Country: Syria
- Governorate: Aleppo
- District: Azaz
- Subdistrict: Akhtarin
- Elevation: 467 m (1,532 ft)

Population (2024 census)
  - Total: 15,000 people
- Time zone: UTC+2 (EET)
  - Summer (DST): UTC+3 (EEST)
- Geocode: C1605

Turkman Bareh (Arabic: تركمان بارح, romanized: Turkumān Bāriḩ), alternatively spelled Barih, is a town in northern Aleppo Governorate, northwestern Syria. About 40 kilometres (25 mi) northeast of the city of Aleppo and about 13 km (8.1 mi) south of Syria's border with Turkey, it is administratively part of Nahiya Akhtarin of Azaz District. Nearby localities include Dabiq 5 km (3.1 mi) to the west and Akhtarin 4 km (2.5 mi) to the south. In the 2010 census, Turkman Bareh had a population of 5,416. The town is inhabited by Turkmen.

The town has been in close proximity to sustained fighting in the Syrian civil war.
