= Ghaytun =

Ghaytun غيطون
- Village
- Location of Ghaytun in Syria
- Coordinates: 36°29′05″N 37°18′18″E
- Country: Syria
- Governorate: Aleppo
- District: Azaz
- Subdistrict: Akhtarin
- Elevation: 475 m (1,558 ft)

Population (2004)
  - Total: 1,080
- Time zone: UTC+2 (EET)
  - Summer (DST): UTC+3 (EEST)
- Geocode: C1614

Ghaytun (Arabic: غيطون, romanized: Ghayţūn) is a village in northern Aleppo Governorate, northwestern Syria. About 30 kilometres (19 mi) north of the city of Aleppo and some 20 km (12 mi) south of Syria's border with Turkey, it is administratively part of Nahiya Akhtarin of Azaz District. Nearby localities include Akhtarin 4 km (2.5 mi) to the northeast, Ghuz 2 km (1.2 mi) to the south, and Mare' 9 km (5.6 mi) to the west. In the 2004 census, Ghaytun had a population of 1,080.
