= Ameriyeh-ye Bala =

Ameriyeh-ye Bala عامريه بالا
- Village
- Location within Iran
- Coordinates: 28°47′41″N 58°51′45″E
- Country: Iran
- Province: Kerman
- County: Fahraj
- Bakhsh: Central
- Rural District: Borj-e Akram

Population (2006)
  - Total: 423
- Time zone: UTC+3:30 (IRST)
  - Summer (DST): UTC+4:30 (IRDT)

Ameriyeh-ye Bala (Persian: عامريه بالا, also Romanized as Āmerīyeh-ye Bālā; also known as Āmerīyeh and ‘Āmerīyeh) is a village in Borj-e Akram Rural District, in the Central District of Fahraj County, Kerman Province, Iran. At the 2006 census, its population was 423, in 99 families.
