= Ameriyeh, Kerman =

Ameriyeh عامريه
- Village
- Location within Iran
- Coordinates: 29°30′27″N 57°37′48″E
- Country: Iran
- Province: Kerman
- County: Kerman
- Bakhsh: Rayen
- Rural District: Rayen

Population (2006)
  - Total: 14
- Time zone: UTC+3:30 (IRST)
  - Summer (DST): UTC+4:30 (IRDT)

Ameriyeh (Persian: عامريه, also Romanized as ‘Āmerīyeh; also known as Amīrābād) is a village in Rayen Rural District, Rayen District, Kerman County, Kerman Province, Iran. At the 2006 census, its population was 14, in 5 families.
