= Dabiq, Syria =

Town in Aleppo Governorate, Syria

Dabiq دابق
- Town
- Location of Dabiq in Syria
- Coordinates: 36°32′14″N 37°16′05″E
- Country: Syria
- Governorate: Aleppo
- District: Azaz
- Subdistrict: Akhtarin
- Elevation: 449.18 m (1,473.7 ft)

Population (2004)
  - Total: 3,364
- Time zone: UTC+3 (AST)
- Geocode: C1597

Dabiq (Arabic: دابق [ˈdaːbiq]) is a town in northern Syria, about 40 kilometres (25 mi) northeast of Aleppo and around 10 km (6.2 mi) south of Syria's border with Turkey. It is administratively part of the Akhtarin nahiyah (subdistrict) of the A'zaz District of Aleppo Governorate. Nearby localities include Mare' to the southwest, Sawran to the northwest, and Akhtarin town to the southeast. In the 2004 census, Dabiq had a population of 3,364. The town was the site of the battle of Marj Dabiq in 1516, in which the Ottoman Empire decisively defeated the Mamluk Sultanate.

In Islamic eschatology, it is believed that Dabiq is one of two possible locations (the other is Amaq) for an epic battle between invading Christians and the defending Muslims which will result in a Muslim victory and mark the beginning of the end of times. The Islamic terrorist group Islamic State believes Dabiq is where an epic and decisive battle will take place with Christian forces of the West, and have named their online magazine after the village. After being driven out of the town of Dabiq by the Turkish military and Syrian rebels in October 2016, IS replaced this publication with a new one named Rumiyah.

== History ==
During Caliph Sulayman's reign (715–717), Dabiq, near the Arab–Byzantine frontier, succeeded Jabiyah's role as the main Umayyad military camp in northern Syria.

Dabiq was visited by Syrian geographer Yaqut al-Hamawi in the early 13th century, during Ayyubid rule. He noted that it was "a village of the 'Azaz District lying 4 leagues from Halab (Aleppo). Near it is a green and pleasant meadow, where the Omayyad troops encamped when they made the celebrated expedition against Al Massissah, which was to have been continued even to the walls of Constantinople. The tomb of Caliph Sulayman ibn Abd al-Malik, who led the expedition, lies here."

In August 2014, the Islamic State (IS) conquered the town, destroying the Sulayman ibn Abd al-Malik shrine. On 16 October 2016, Syrian National Army rebels captured the town from IS.

== In Islamic eschatology ==
In Islamic eschatology as found in the Hadith, the area of Dabiq is mentioned as a place of some of the events of the Muslim Malahim (which would equate to the Christian apocalypse, or Armageddon). Abu Hurayrah, companion to Muhammad, reported in his Hadith that Muhammad said:

The Last Hour would not come until the Romans land at al-A’maq or in Dabiq. An army consisting of the best (soldiers) of the people of the earth at that time will come from Medina (to counteract them).

Scholars and hadith commentators suggest that the word Romans refers to Christians. The hadith further relates the subsequent Muslim victory, followed by the peaceful takeover of Constantinople with invocations of takbir and tasbih, and finally the defeat of the Masih ad-Dajjal following the return and descent of Jesus Christ.

== Bibliography ==
- le Strange, Guy (1890). Palestine Under the Moslems: A Description of Syria and the Holy Land from A.D. 650 to 1500. Committee of the Palestine Exploration Fund.
- Lammens, H. (1991) [1965]. "Al-D̲j̲ābiya". In Lewis, B.; Pellat, Ch.; Schacht, J. (eds.). The Encyclopedia of Islam. Vol. II: C–G (new ed.). Leiden and New York: Brill. p. 360. ISBN 90-04-07026-5.
