= Akhtarin =

Akhtarin أخترين
- Town
- Location of Akhtarin in Syria
- Coordinates: 36°30′39″N 37°20′09″E
- Country: Syria
- Governorate: Aleppo
- District: Azaz
- Subdistrict: Akhtarin
- Elevation: 471 m (1,545 ft)

Population (2004)
  - Total: 5,305
- Time zone: UTC+2 (EET)
  - Summer (DST): UTC+3 (EEST)
- Geocode: C1581

Akhtarin (Arabic: أخترين, romanized: Akhtarīn) is a town in northern Aleppo Governorate, northwestern Syria. The largest town and administrative centre of Nahiya Akhtarin of the A'zaz District has a population of 5,305 in the 2004 census. Located 38 km (24 mi) northeast of the city of Aleppo, nearby localities include Mare' to the southwest, Dabiq to the northwest, and Ziadiyah to the northeast.

Akhtarin is the administrative center of Nahiya Akhtarin of the Azaz District.
