= Queiq =

River in Syria and Turkey

Coordinates: 36°24′21″N 37°17′23″E

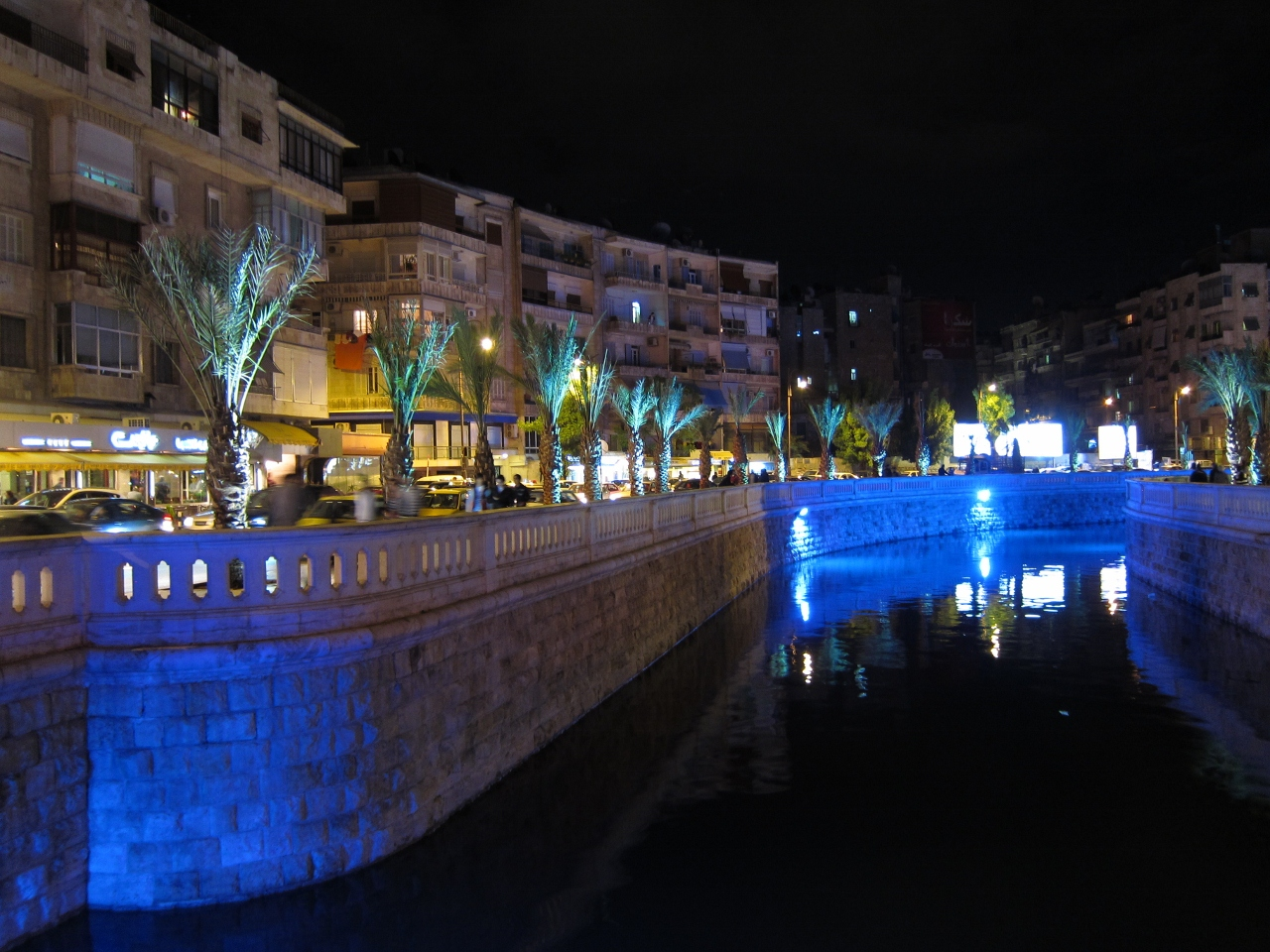
- Queiq River in downtown Aleppo, 2011

Location
- Country: Syria
- Governorate: Aleppo Governorate

Physical characteristics
- Source
  - location: Taurus Mountains
- Mouth
  - location: South of Aleppo
- Length: 129 km (80 mi)

The Queiq (Modern Standard Arabic: قُوَيْقٌ, Quwayq, [quˈwajq]; northern Syrian Arabic: ʾWēʾ, [ʔwɛːʔ]), (Note: Including Qoueiq, Qoueiq, Kweik, and Quweiq.) is an endorheic river and wadi of the Aleppo Governorate, Syria and Turkey. It is a 129 kilometres (80 mi)-long river that rises from the Taurus Mountains, flowing parallel to the Euphrates through the Aintab Plateau, along the western rim of the Matah Depression, and running through the northern Syrian city of Aleppo before pouring into the plains and swamps south of the city.

The evidence from Ford, Pratt, and McGowwan’s 19th-century investigations shows that its waters come from copious springs near Aintab which would naturally flow into a branch (the Sağun) of the Euphrates basin. Instead, the Romans diverted these waters artificially, channeling them southwards through aqueducts to supply the Silk Road city of Aleppo. The aqueducts then flow into a natural wadi that, after merging with the Akpınar stream near Kilis, carries them towards Aleppo and the ancient city of Qinnasrin. This Queiq valley has been occupied for thousands of years and in ancient times was noted for its flint industries and pottery.

The etymology of the term refers to the croaking sounds of frogs, a common animal on the banks of the stream and a medieval European luxury food item. In antiquity, it was known to the Greeks as the Belus in (Ancient Greek: Βήλος, Bēlos), often translated as the Chalos and also known in English as the Aleppo River. Al-Istikhati labelled it "Abul Hasan, or Queiq", in the 10th century.

== Modern times ==
The river dried up completely in the late 1960s, due to irrigation projects on the Turkish side of the border. Recently, water from the Euphrates has been diverted to revive the dead river, and thus revive agriculture in the plains south of Aleppo, but many Syrians remain bitter towards the Turks over their handling of the river.

To revive the river and build irrigation, the Tal Hasel Water Pumping Station was opened in 2008 in rural Aleppo. After closing due to the Civil War, the station was restored and made operational again in July 2022.

== Geography and climate ==
The region is characterized by a semi-arid climate with an average annual precipitation of 325 mm.

Severe over-exploitation of groundwater has been observed on the Aleppo basin of the river, leading to a continuous decline of the water table levels with an average of 1.8 m/year.

== Queiq River Massacre ==
In late January 2013 during the Syrian civil war over 100 dead bodies were washed up from or floating in the river in rebel-held parts of Bustan al-Qasr district, Aleppo. They were typically found with hands tied behind their backs and having gunshot wounds in their heads with tape across their mouths. Nearly all the victims were in their twenties (not older than 30) who had recently crossed the border line from the rebel-controlled neighbourhood into the government one. Blame for murders was widely put on Bashar al-Assad's regime as the bodies usually came downstream from the government controlled area.

Between February and mid-March 2013, between 80 and 120 additional bodies were recovered from the river.

Youssef Horan, a lawyer and activist, with his team of volunteers have gathered information on the murders at the time. The Syrian Institute for Justice headed at the time by Abdulkader Mandou, also investigated the case and held a press conference.

== Gallery ==
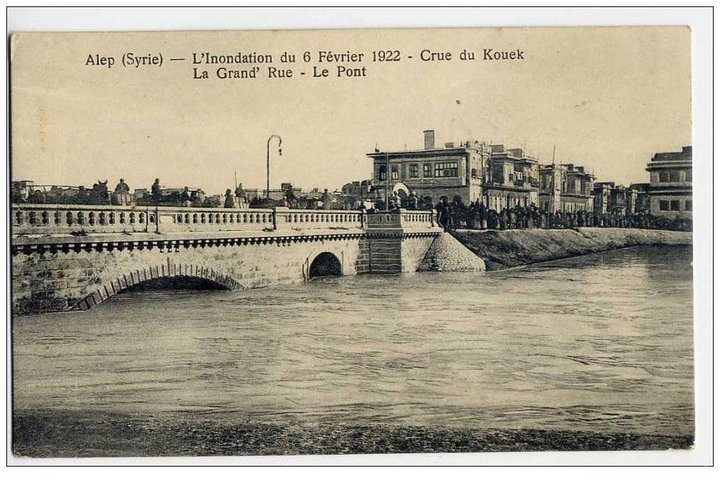
The flood of Queiq River in February 1922

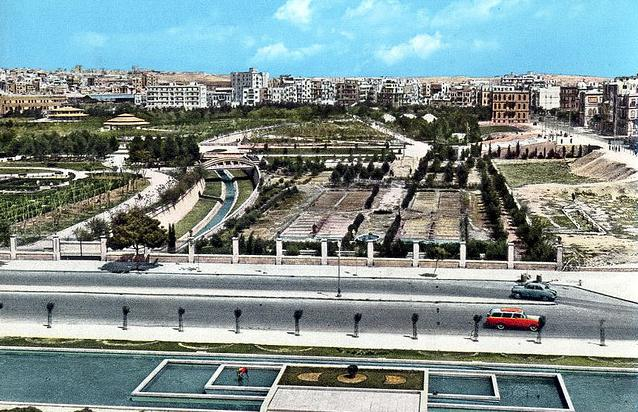
The river crossing the Aleppo Public Park in the 1950s

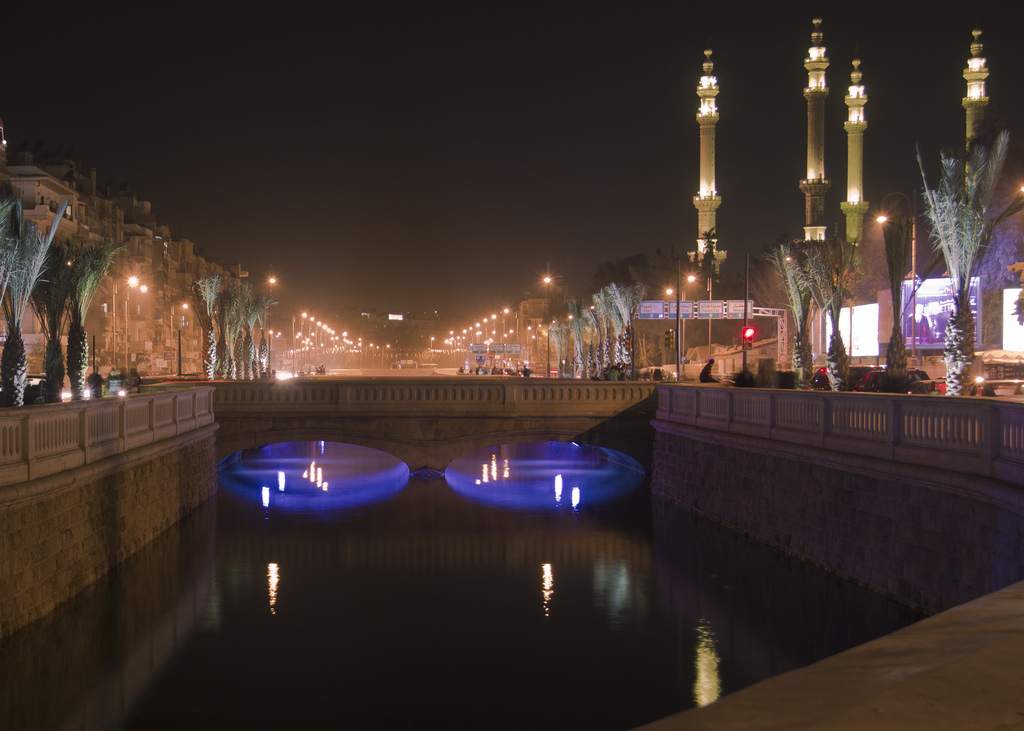
The river in 2010, downtown Aleppo

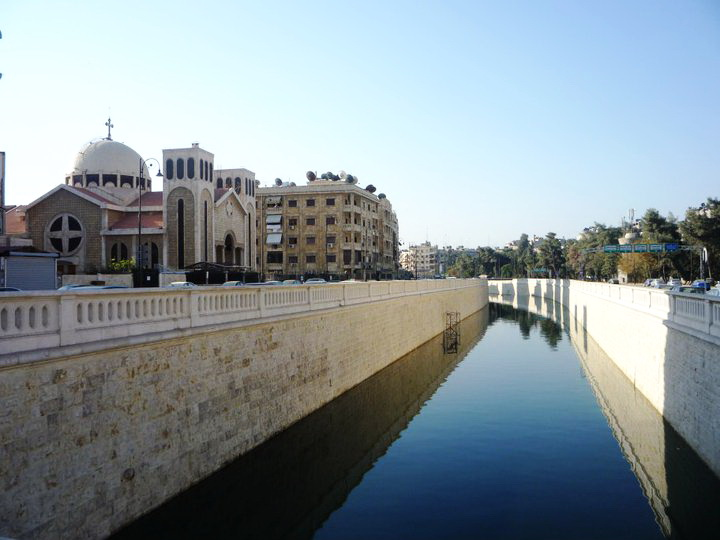
Queiq river in 2011
