= Timeline of the Syrian civil war =

This is a broad timeline of the course of major events of the Syrian civil war. It only includes major territorial changes and attacks and does not include every event.

The uprising against Syrian president Bashar al-Assad gradually turned into a full-scale civil war, with two significant milestones being the initial March 2011 Arab Spring protests and the 15 July 2012 declaration by the International Committee of the Red Cross that the fighting had gradually become so widespread that the situation should be regarded as a civil war.

Rebel forces, which received arms from Gulf Cooperation Council states, Turkey and some Western countries, initially made significant advances against the government forces, which were receiving financial and military support from Iran and Russia. Rebels captured the regional capitals of Raqqa in 2013 and Idlib in 2015. Consequently, Iran launched a military intervention in support of the Syrian government in 2014 and Russia followed in 2015, shifting the balance of the conflict. By late 2018, all rebel strongholds except parts of Idlib region had fallen to the government forces.

In 2014, the Islamic State won many battles against both the rebel factions and the Syrian government. Combined with simultaneous success in Iraq, the group was able to seize control of large parts of Eastern Syria and Western Iraq, prompting the U.S.-led CJTF coalition to launch an aerial bombing campaign against it, while providing ground support and supplies to the Kurdish-majority Syrian Democratic Forces. By way of battles that culminated in the Raqqa and Deir ez-Zor offensives, the Islamic State was territorially defeated by late 2017. In August 2016, Turkey launched a multi-pronged invasion of northern Syria, in response to the creation of Autonomous Administration of North and East Syria, while also fighting the Islamic State and government forces in the process.

In October 2019, Kurdish leaders of Rojava announced they had reached a major deal with the government of Syria under Assad. This deal was enacted in the wake of the US withdrawal from Syria. Between the March 2020 Idlib ceasefire and late 2024, frontline fighting mostly subsided, but there were regular skirmishes.

Heavy fighting renewed with a major rebel offensive in the northwest led by Tahrir al-Sham in November 2024, seizing the second-largest city Aleppo. On 8 December 2024, Syrian opposition forces captured Damascus after Bashar al-Assad's forces withdrew and subsequently announced the collapse of Assad's regime.

There remain millions of Syrian refugees who are displaced into refugee camps across the region, under severe conditions.

The more detailed timeline of the Syrian Civil War is contained in the articles linked to in the infobox on the right and in the list below. A chronological narrative of some of the main events and developments follows the list of years, but it is not comprehensive. (Note: As at 3 January 2019, the information in the narrative section here have not been fully synced with the linked-to sub-articles.)

== Initial phase of the conflict (2011–2012) ==
=== Protests, civil uprising, and defections (March–July 2011) ===
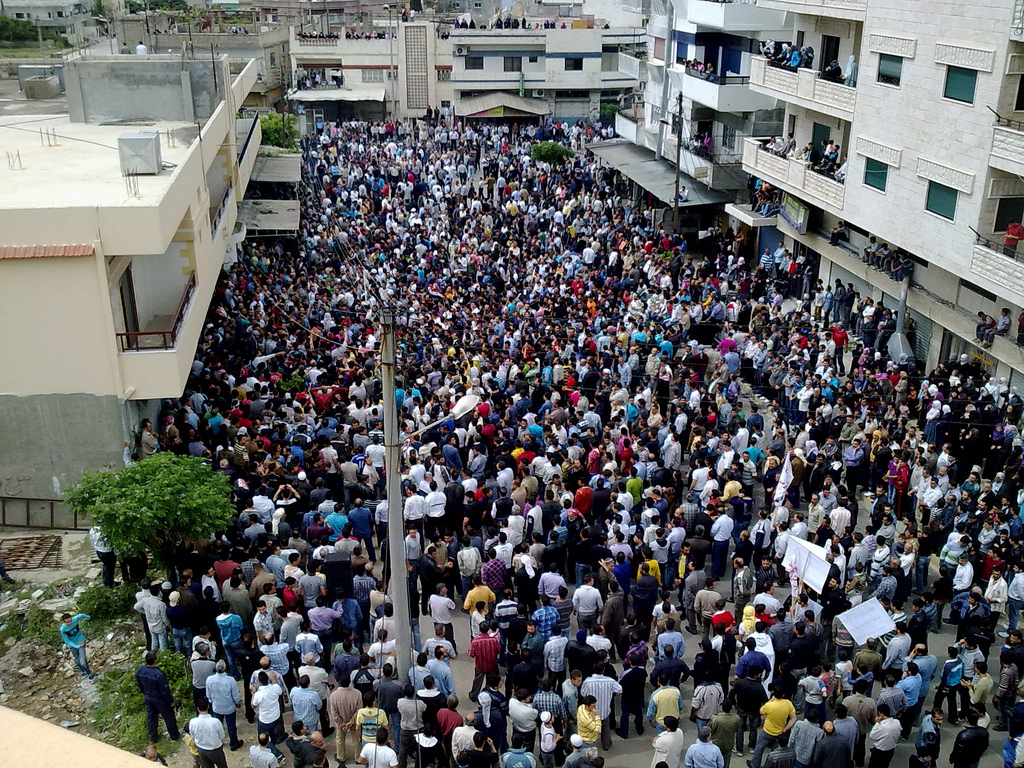
Anti-Assad protests in Baniyas, 29 April 2011

Major unrest began on 15 March 2011, when protesters marched in Damascus and Aleppo, demanding democratic reforms and the release of political prisoners, triggered by the arrest of a teenage boy and his friends a few days earlier in the city of Daraa, for writing in graffiti, "It's your turn, doctor". Security forces retaliated by opening fire on the protesters, and according to witnesses who spoke to the BBC, the Ba'ath government forces detained six of them. On 18 March, the Syrian Army fired on demonstrators, killing four people. Writer and analyst Louai al-Hussein, referencing the Arab Spring ongoing at that time, wrote that, "Syria is now on the map of countries in the region with an uprising". On 20 March, the protesters burned down a Ba'ath Party headquarters and other government buildings. The ensuing clashes claimed the lives of 15 protesters. Ten days later in a speech, President Bashar al-Assad blamed "foreign conspirators" pushing Israeli propaganda for the protests.

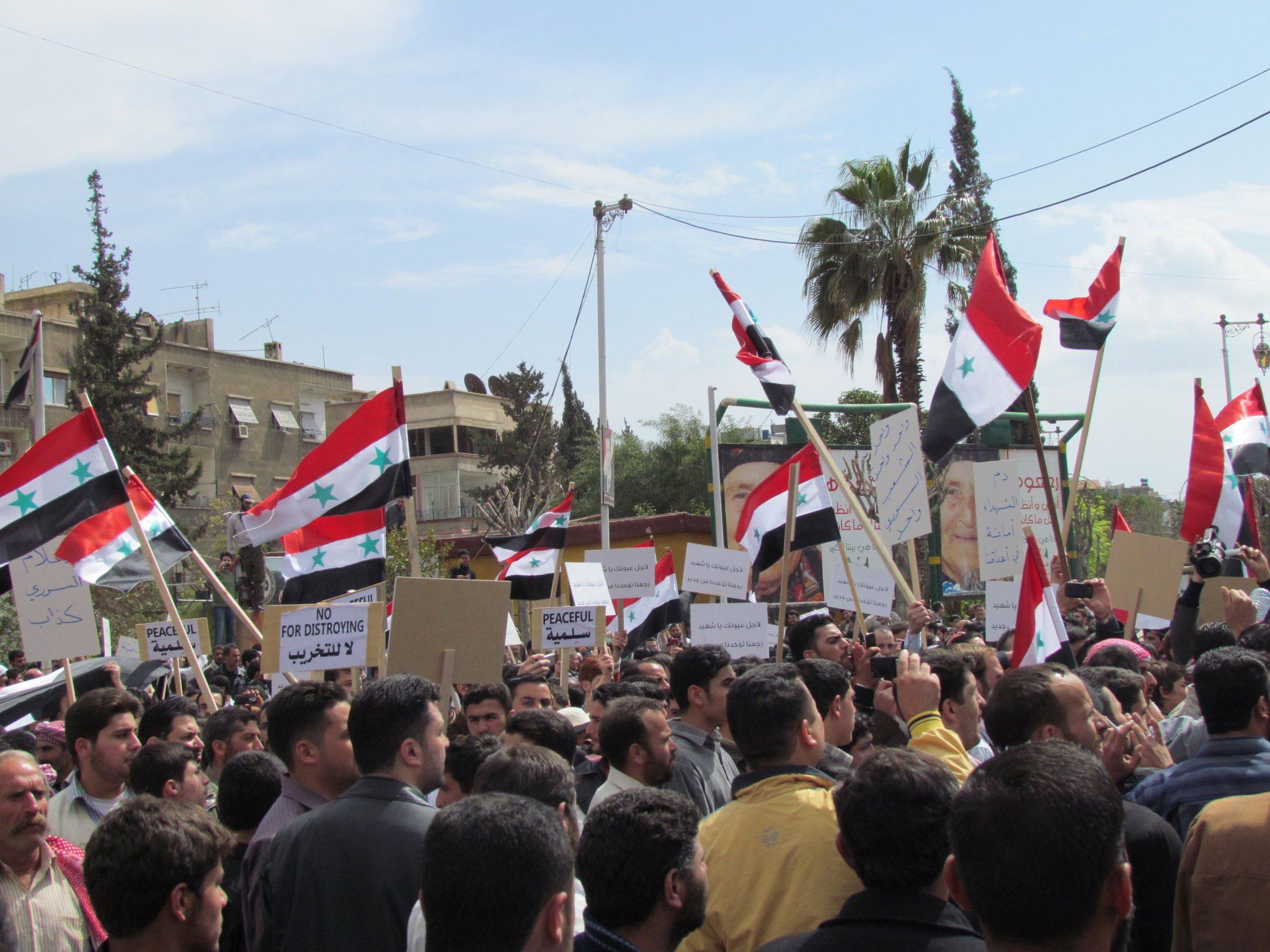
Protests in Douma on 8 April 2011 against President Bashar al-Assad

Until 7 April, the protesters predominantly demanded democratic reforms, release of political prisoners, an increase in freedoms, abolition of the emergency law and an end to corruption. After 8 April, the emphasis in demonstration slogans shifted slowly towards a call to overthrow the Assad government. Protests spread; on Friday 8 April, they occurred simultaneously in ten cities. By Friday 22 April, protests were taking place in twenty cities. On 25 April, the Syrian Army initiated a series of large-scale deadly military attacks on towns with tanks, infantry carriers, and artillery, leading to hundreds of civilian deaths. By the end of May 2011, 1,000 civilians and 150 soldiers and policemen had been killed and thousands detained; among the arrested were many students, liberal activists and human rights advocates.

Unverified reports claim that a portion of the security forces in Jisr al-Shughur defected after secret police and intelligence officers executed soldiers who had refused to fire on civilians. Later, more protesters in Syria took up arms, and more soldiers defected to protect protesters.

On 1 July 2011, 100,000 people protested against the government across Syria.

=== Initial armed insurgency (July 2011–April 2012) ===
Animation showing changes in Syrian territorial control, as well as foreign military bases, between October 2011 and March 2019.

The Early insurgency phase of the Syrian civil war lasted from late July 2011 to April 2012, and was associated with the rise of armed oppositional militias across Syria and the beginning of armed rebellion against the authorities of the Syrian Arab Republic. The beginning of organized insurgency is typically marked by the formation of the Free Syrian Army (FSA) on 29 July 2011, when a group of defected officers declared the establishment of the first organized oppositional military force. Composed of defected Syrian Armed Forces personnel, the rebel army aimed to protect protestors and ultimately remove Bashar al-Assad and his government from power.

This period of the war saw the initial civil uprising take on many of the characteristics of a civil war, according to several outside observers, including the United Nations Commission on Human Rights, as armed elements became better organized and began carrying out successful attacks in retaliation for the crackdown by the Syrian Ba'athist government on demonstrators and defectors.

The Arab League monitoring mission, initiated in December 2011, ended in failure by February 2012, as Syrian Ba'athist troops and oppositional militants continued to battle across the country and the Syrian Ba'athist government prevented foreign observers from touring active battlefields, including besieged oppositional strongholds.

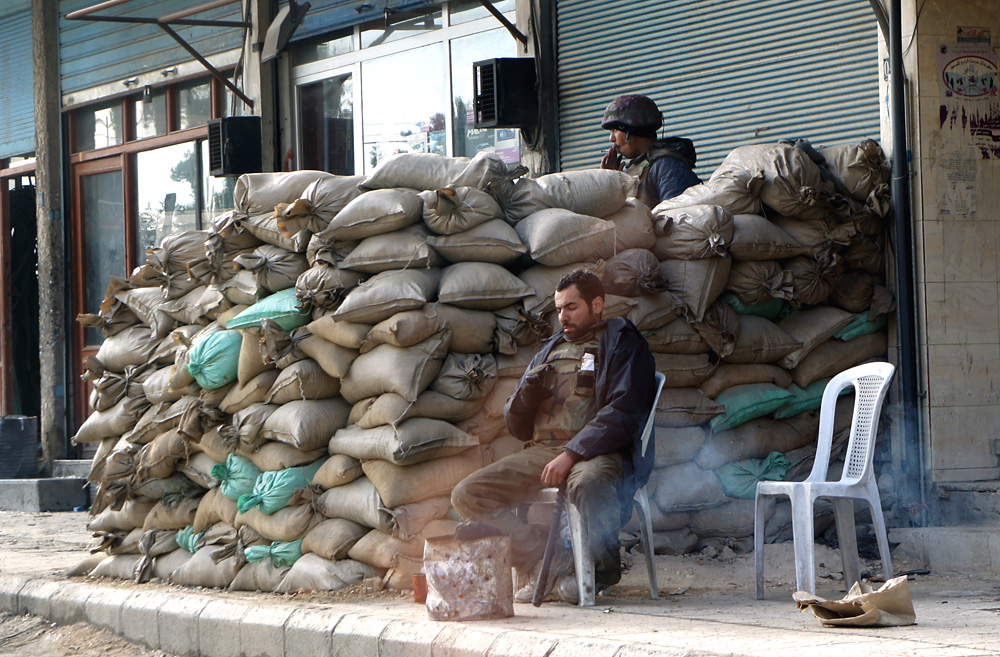
Syrian army checkpoint in Douma, January 2012

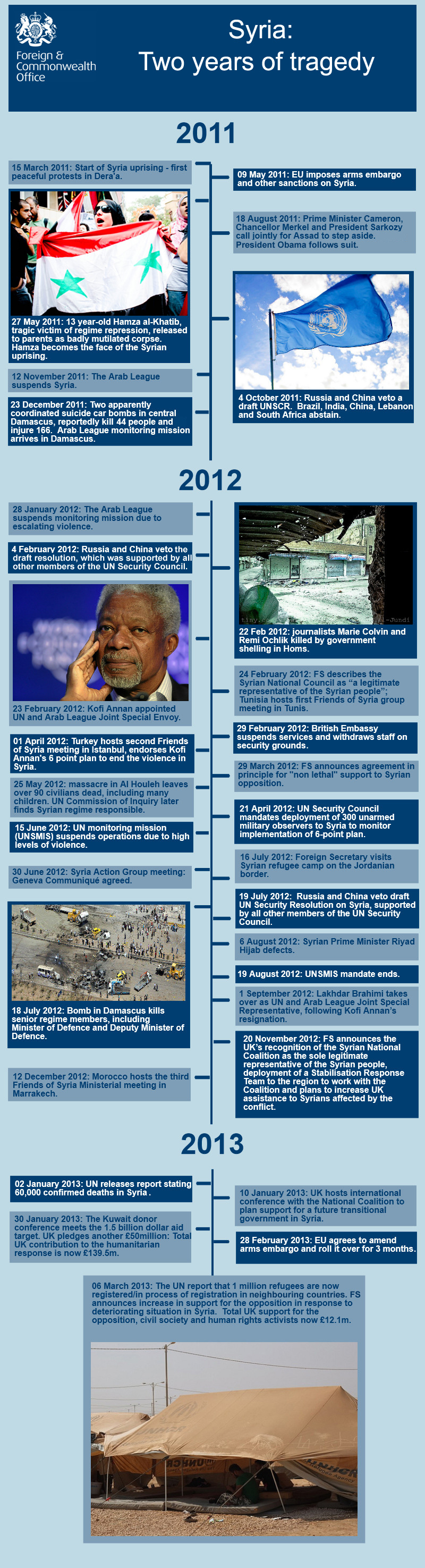
Timeline - Syria

Syrian and Iraqi refugees arrive at Skala Sykamias, Lesvos, Greece

=== Kofi Annan ceasefire attempt (April–May 2012) ===
In early 2012, Kofi Annan acted as the UN–Arab League Joint Special Representative for Syria and started negotiations for a peace plan, which included provision for a ceasefire. However, even as the negotiations for it were being conducted, the Syrian army continued fighting. Incommunicado detention, including of children, also continued. In April, Assad began employing attack helicopters against rebel forces.

On 12 April, both sides, the Syrian Ba'athist Government and rebels of the FSA, entered a UN-mediated ceasefire period. It was a failure, with infractions of the ceasefire by both sides resulting in several dozen casualties. For examples, the 30 April 2012 Idlib bombing was a car bombing that targeted the Syrian military in Idlib, killing twenty people. Most of those killed were members of the security forces. Acknowledging its failure, Annan called for Iran to be "part of the solution", though the country has been excluded from the Friends of Syria initiative. The peace plan practically collapsed by early June and the UN mission was withdrawn from Syria. Annan officially resigned in frustration on 2 August 2012.

== Next phase of the war starts: escalation (2012–2013) ==
=== Renewed fighting (June–October 2012) ===
Following the Houla massacre of 25 May 2012, in which 108 people were summarily executed and the consequent FSA ultimatum to the Syrian Ba'athist government, the ceasefire practically collapsed, as the FSA began nationwide offensives against government troops. On 1 June, President Assad vowed to crush the anti-government uprising.

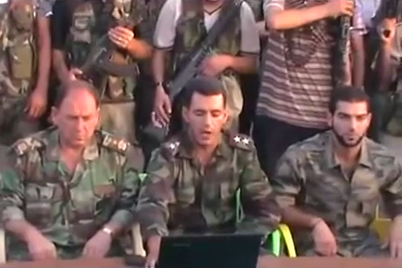
A colonel (left) and a first lieutenant (right) in the FSA announce the formation of the Conquest Brigade, part of the FSA in Tell Rifaat, north of Aleppo, 31 July 2012.

On 5 June, fighting broke out in Haffa and nearby villages in the coastal governorate of Latakia Governorate. Syrian Army troops were backed by helicopter gunships in the heaviest clashes in the governorate since the revolt began. Government forces seized the territory following days of fighting and shelling. On 6 June, 78 civilians were killed in the Al-Qubeir massacre. According to activist sources, the Syrian Army started by shelling the village before the Shabiha militia moved in. The UN observers headed to Al-Qubeir in the hope of investigating the alleged massacre, but they were met with a roadblock and small arms fire and were forced to retreat.

On 12 June 2012, the UN for the first time officially proclaimed Syria to be in a state of civil war. The conflict began moving into the two largest cities, Damascus and Aleppo. In both cities, peaceful protests – including a general strike by Damascus shopkeepers and a small strike in Aleppo were interpreted as indicating that the historical alliance between the Ba'ath government and the business establishment in the large cities had become weak.

On 22 June, a Turkish F-4 fighter jet was shot down by Syrian government forces, killing both pilots. Syria and Turkey disputed whether the jet had been flying in Syrian or international airspace when it was shot down. Despite Turkish Prime Minister Recep Tayyip Erdoğan's vows to retaliate harshly against Assad's government, no such intervention materialised. Bashar al-Assad publicly apologised for the incident. By 10 July, rebel forces had captured most of the city of Al-Qusayr, in Homs Governorate, after weeks of fighting. By mid-July, rebels had captured the town of Saraqeb, in Idlib Governorate.

Military situation in Syria in August 2012

By 15 July 2012, with fighting spread across the country and 16,000 people killed, the International Committee of the Red Cross declared the conflict a civil war. Fighting in Damascus intensified, with a major rebel push to take the city. On 18 July, Syrian Defense Minister Dawoud Rajiha, former defense minister Hasan Turkmani, and the president's brother-in-law General Assef Shawkat were killed by a suicide bomb attack in Damascus. The Syrian intelligence chief Hisham Ikhtiyar, who was injured in the same explosion, later died from his injuries. Both the FSA and Liwa al-Islam claimed responsibility for the assassination.

In mid-July, rebel forces attacked Damascus and were repelled in two weeks, although fighting continued in the outskirts. After this, the focus shifted to the battle for control of Aleppo. On 25 July, multiple sources reported that the government was using fighter jets to attack rebel positions in Aleppo and Damascus, and on 1 August, UN observers in Syria witnessed government fighter jets firing on rebels in Aleppo. In early August, the Syrian Army recaptured Salaheddin district, an important rebel stronghold in Aleppo. In August, the Ba'athist government began using fixed-wing warplanes against the rebels.

On 19 July, Iraqi officials reported that the FSA had gained control of all four border checkpoints between Syria and Iraq, increasing concerns for the safety of Iraqis trying to escape the violence in Syria. On 19 September, rebel forces seized a border crossing between Syria and Turkey in Raqqa Governorate. It was speculated that this crossing could provide opposition forces with strategic and logistical advantages due to Turkish support of the rebels, whose headquarters subsequently relocated from southern Turkey into northern Syria.

On 6 September 2012 Kurdish activists reported that 21 civilians were killed in the Kurdish neighborhood of Sheikh Maqsud in Aleppo, when the Syrian Army shelled the local mosque and its surroundings. Despite the district being neutral during the Battle of Aleppo and free of Ba'athist government and FSA clashes, local residents believed that the district was shelled as retaliation for sheltering anti-government civilians from other parts of the city. In a statement released shortly after the deaths, the Kurdish People's Protection Units (YPG) vowed to retaliate.

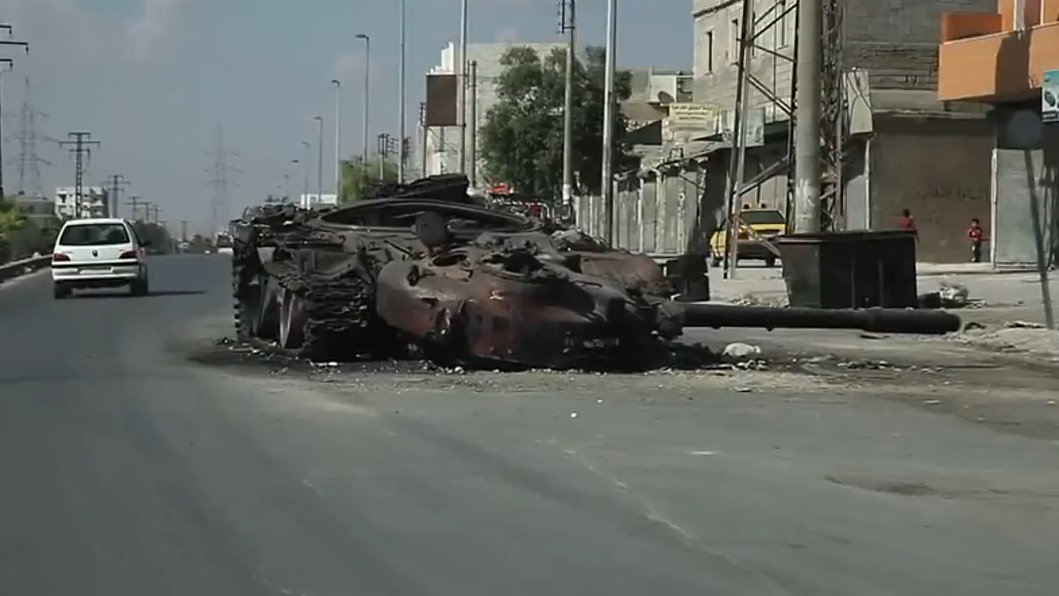
A destroyed tank on a road in Aleppo, 6 October 2012

A few days later, Kurdish forces killed 3 soldiers in Afrin (Kurdish: Efrîn) and captured a number of other Ba'athist government soldiers in Ayn al-Arab (Kurdish: Kobanî) and Al-Malikiyah (Kurdish: Dêrika Hemko) from where they drove the remaining Ba'athist government security forces. It was also reported that the Ba'athist government had begun to arm Arab tribes around Qamishli in preparation for a possible confrontation with Kurdish forces, who still did not completely control the city.

At least 8 Ba'athist government soldiers were killed and 15 wounded by a car bomb in the al-Gharibi district of Qamishli on 30 September 2012. The explosion targeted the Political Security branch.

In October, rebel forces seized control of Maarat al-Numan, a town in Idlib Governorate on the highway linking Damascus with Aleppo and captured Douma, marking increased influence in Rif Dimashq. Lakhdar Brahimi arranged for a ceasefire during Eid al-Adha in late October, but it quickly collapsed.

=== Rebel offensives (November 2012–April 2013) ===
After Brahimi's ceasefire agreement ended on 30 October, the Syrian military expanded its aerial bombing campaign in Damascus. A bombing of the Damascus district of Jobar was the first instance of a fighter jet being used to bomb Damascus. The following day, Gen. Abdullah Mahmud al-Khalidi, a Syrian Air Force commander, was assassinated by opposition gunmen in the Damascus district of Rukn al-Din. In early November 2012, rebels made significant gains in northern Syria. The rebel capture of Saraqib in Idlib Governorate, which lies on the M5 highway, further isolated Aleppo. Due to insufficient anti-aircraft weapons, rebel units attempted to nullify the Ba'athist government's air power by destroying landed helicopters and aircraft on air bases. On 3 November, rebels launched an attack on the Taftanaz air base.

On 18 November, rebels took control of Base 46 in the Aleppo Governorate, one of the Syrian Army's largest bases in northern Syria, after weeks of intense fighting. Defected General Mohammed Ahmed al-Faj, who commanded the assault, stated that nearly 300 Syrian troops had been killed and 60 had been captured, with rebels seizing large amounts of heavy weapons, including tanks. On 22 November, rebels captured the Mayadin military base in the country's eastern Deir ez-Zor Governorate. Activists said this gave the rebels control of a large amount of territory east of the base, stretching to the Iraqi border. On 29 November, at approximately 10:26 UTC, the Syrian Internet and phone service was shut off for a two-day period. Syrian officials blamed the blackout on terrorists having cut "a main fiber optic cable connecting Damascus to the rest of the world"; Edward Snowden in August 2014 claimed that this Internet breakdown had been caused, though unintended, by hackers of the NSA during an operation to intercept Internet communication in Syria.

In mid-December 2012, American officials said that the Syrian military had fired Scud ballistic missiles at rebel fighters inside Syria. Reportedly, six Scud missiles were fired at the Sheikh Suleiman base north of Aleppo, which rebel forces had occupied. It is unclear whether the Scuds hit the intended target. The Ba'athist government denied this claim. Later that month, a further Scud attack took place near Marea, a town north of Aleppo near the Turkish border. The missile appeared to have missed its target. That same month, the British Daily Telegraph reported that the FSA had now penetrated into Latakia Governorate's coast through Turkey. In late December, rebel forces pushed further into Damascus, taking control of the adjoining Yarmouk and Palestine refugee camps, pushing out pro-Ba'athist government Popular Front for the Liberation of Palestine-General Command fighters with the help of other factions. Rebel forces launched an offensive in Hama Governorate, later claiming to have forced army regulars to evacuate several towns and bases, and stating that "three-quarters of western rural Hama is under our control." Rebels also captured the town of Harem near the Turkish border in Idlib Governorate, after weeks of heavy fighting.

On 11 January 2013, Islamist groups, including al-Nusra Front, took full control of the Taftanaz air base in the Idlib Governorate, after weeks of fighting. The air base was often used by the Syrian military to carry out helicopter raids and deliver supplies. The rebels claimed to have seized helicopters, tanks and multiple rocket launchers, before being forced to withdraw by a Ba'athist government counter-attack. The leader of the al-Nusra Front said the amount of weapons they took was a "game changer". On 11 February, Islamist rebels captured the town of Al-Thawrah in Raqqa Governorate and the nearby Tabqa Dam, Syria's largest dam and a key source of hydroelectricity. The next day, rebel forces took control of Jarrah air base, located 60 kilometres (37 mi) east of Aleppo. On 14 February, fighters from al-Nusra Front took control of Shadadeh, a town in Al-Hasakah Governorate near the Iraqi border.

On 20 February, a car bomb exploded in Damascus near the Ba'ath Syrian Regional Branch headquarters, killing at least 53 people and injuring more than 235. None of the groups claimed responsibility. On 21 February, the FSA in Quasar began shelling Hezbollah positions in Lebanon. Prior to this, Hezbollah had been shelling villages near Quasar from within Lebanon. A 48-hour ultimatum was issued by a FSA commander on 20 February, warning the militant group to stop the attacks.

On 2 March, intense clashes between rebels and the Syrian Army erupted in the city of Raqqa, with many reportedly killed on both sides.[76] On the same day, Syrian troops regained several villages near Aleppo.[77] By 3 March, rebels had overrun Raqqa's central prison, allowing them to free hundreds of prisoners, according to the SOHR.[78] The SOHR also stated that rebel fighters were now in control of most of an Aleppo police academy in Khan al-Asal, and that over 200 rebels and Ba'athist government troops had been killed fighting for control of it.[79]

By 6 March, the rebels had captured the city of Raqqa, effectively making it the first provincial capital to be lost by the Assad government. Residents of Raqqa toppled a bronze statue of his late father Hafez al-Assad in the centre of the city. The rebels also seized two top Ba'athist government officials. On 18 March, the Syrian Air Force attacked rebel positions in Lebanon for the first time. The attack occurred at the Wadi al-Khayl Valley area, near the town of Arsal. On 21 March, a suspected suicide bombing in the Iman Mosque in Mazraa district killed as many as 41 people, including the pro-Assad Sunni cleric, Sheikh Mohammed al-Buti. On 23 March, several rebel groups seized the 38th division air defense base in southern Daraa Governorate near a highway linking Damascus to Jordan. On the next day, rebels captured a 25 km strip of land near the Jordanian border, which included the towns of Muzrib, Abdin, and the al-Rai military checkpoint.

Military situation in March 2013

On 25 March, rebels launched one of their heaviest bombardments of Central Damascus since the revolt began. Fighting between the army and YPG fighters in the Kurdish village of Gir Zîro (Tall Adas), near al-Maabadah (Kurdish: Girkê Legê), where an army battalion of around 200 soldiers had been blockaded since 9 January. YPG forces claimed to have expelled Ba'athist government after the clashes. One soldier was reportedly killed and another eight injured, while seven were captured (later released) and 27 defected. Fighting at the oil field near Gir Zîro ended on 21 January, when Ba'athist government forces withdrew after receiving no assistance from Damascus. In Rumeilan, directly west of al-Maabadah, another 200 soldiers had been surrounded by YPG forces, and 10 soldiers were reported to have defected.

From 8 to 11 February, heavy clashes broke out between the YPG and Ba'athist government troops in the PYD/YPG-held district Ashrafiyah where, according to SOHR, at least 3 soldiers and 5 pro-Ba'athist government militiamen were killed. The fighting followed deadly shelling on 31 January on Ashrafiyah, in which 23 civilians were killed after FSA units moved into the Kurdish sector of Aleppo. According to its own reports, the YPG lost 7 of its members in the fighting, while also claiming that 48 soldiers were killed and 22 captured, and a further 70 injured.

In early March, YPG forces established full control of oil fields and installations in north-east Syria after Ba'athist government forces posted there surrendered. Also, YPG assaulted Ba'athist government forces and took control of the towns of Tall ʿAdas, which is adjacent to Rumeilan oil fields, and Al-Qahtaniya (Kurdish: Tirbespî).

=== Ba'athist government offensives (April–June 2013) ===
Military situation in Syria in June 2013

On 17 April, Ba'athist government forces breached a six-month rebel blockade in Wadi al-Deif, near Idlib. Heavy fighting was reported around the town of Babuleen after Ba'athist government troops attempt to secure control of a main highway leading to Aleppo. The break in the siege also allowed Ba'athist government forces to resupply two major military bases in the region which had been relying on sporadic airdrops. On 18 April, the FSA took control of Al-Dab'a Air Base near the city of al-Qusayr. The base was being used primarily to garrison ground troops. Meanwhile, the Syrian Army re-captured the town of Abel. The SOHR said the loss of the town would hamper rebel movements between al-Qusayr and Homs city. The capture of the airport would have relieved the pressure on the rebels in the area, but their loss of Abel made the situation more complicated. The same day, rebels reportedly assassinated Ali Ballan, who was a Ba'athist government employee, in the Mazzeh district of Damascus. On 21 April, Ba'athist government forces captured the town of Jdaidet al-Fadl, near Damascus.

In April, Ba'athist government and Hezbollah forces launched an offensive to capture areas near al-Qusayr. On 21 April, pro-Assad forces captured the towns of Burhaniya, Saqraja and al-Radwaniya near the Lebanese border. By this point, eight villages had fallen to the Ba'athist government offensive in the area. On 24 April, after five weeks of fighting, Ba'athist government troops re-took control of the town of Otaiba, east of Damascus, which had been serving as the main arms supply route from Jordan. Meanwhile, in the north of the country, rebels took control of a position on the edge of the strategic Mennagh Military airbase, on the outskirts of Aleppo. This allowed them to enter the airbase after months of besieging it.

On 2 May, Ba'athist government forces captured the town of Qaysa in a push north from the city's airport. Troops also retook the Wadi al-Sayeh central district of Homs, driving a wedge between two rebel strongholds. SOHR reported a massacre of over 100 people by the Syrian Army in the coastal town of Al Bayda, Baniyas. However, this could not be independently verified due to movement restrictions on the ground. Yet the multiple video images that residents had recorded – particularly of small children, were so shocking that even some Ba'athist government supporters rejected Syrian television's official version of events, that the army had simply "crushed a number of terrorists."

On 15 June, the Syrian Army captured the Damascus suburb of Ahmadiyeh near the city's airport, and on 22 June, captured the rebel stronghold town of Talkalakh.

=== Continued fighting (July–October 2013) ===
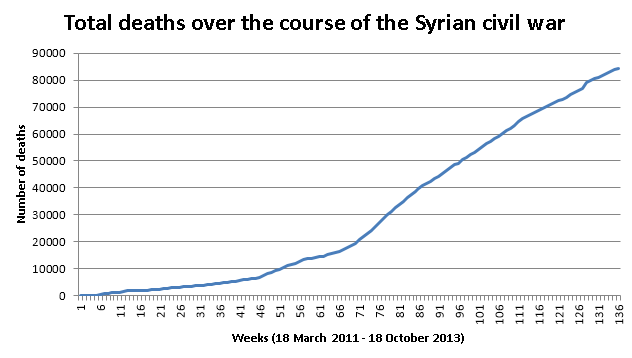
Total deaths during the syrian civil war (October 2013)

On 28 June, rebel forces captured a major military checkpoint in the city of Daraa. On 12 July FSA reported that one of its commanders, Kamal Hamami, had been killed by Islamists a day before. The rebels declared that the assassination by the Islamic State of Iraq and Levant, was tantamount to a declaration of war. On 17 July, FSA forces took control of most of the southern city of Nawa after seizing up to 40 army posts stationed in the city. On 18 July, Kurdish YPG forces secured control of the northern town of Ras al-Ain, after days of fighting with the al-Nusra Front. In the following three months, continued fighting between Kurdish and mainly jihadist rebel forces led to the capture of two dozen towns and villages in Hasakah Governorate by Kurdish fighters, while the Jihadists made limited gains in Aleppo and Raqqa governorates after they turned on the Kurdish rebel group Jabhat al-Akrad over its relationship with the YPG. In Aleppo Governorate, Islamists massacred the Kurds leading to a mass migration of civilians to the town of Afrin.

On 22 July, FSA fighters seized control of the western Aleppo suburb of Khan al-Asal. The town was the last Ba'athist government stronghold in the western portion of Aleppo Governorate. On 27 July, after weeks of fighting and bombardment in Homs, the Syrian Army captured the historic Khalid ibn al-Walid Mosque, and two days later, captured the district of Khaldiyeh.

On 4 August, around 10 rebel brigades, launched a large-scale offensive on the Ba'athist government stronghold of Latakia Governorate. Initial attacks by 2,000 opposition members seized as many as 12 villages in the mountainous area. Between 4 and 5 August 20 rebels and 32 Ba'athist government soldiers and militiamen had been killed in the clashes. Hundreds of Alawite villagers fled to Latakia. By 5 August, rebel fighters advanced to 20 kilometers from Qardaha, the home town of the Assad family. However, in mid-August, the military counter-attacked and recaptured all of the territory previously lost to the rebels in the coastal region during the offensive. A Syrian security force source "told AFP the army still had to recapture the Salma region, a strategic area along the border with Turkey." According to a Human Rights Watch report 190 civilians were killed by rebel forces during the offensive, at least 67 being executed while fleeing, including 48 women and 11 children. Another 200 civilians, primarily women and children, were taken hostage.

On 6 August, rebels captured Menagh Military Airbase after a 10-month siege. The strategic airbase is located on the road between Aleppo city and the Turkish border. On 21 August, a chemical attack took place in the Ghouta region of the Damascus countryside, leading to thousands of casualties and several hundred dead in the opposition-held stronghold. The attack was followed by a military offensive by Ba'athist government forces into the area, which had been hotbeds of the opposition. On 24 August, rebels captured the town of Ariha. However, Ba'athist government forces recaptured Ariha on 3 September. On 26 August, rebel forces took over the town of Khanasir in Aleppo Governorate which was the Ba'athist government's last supply route for the city of Aleppo. On 8 September, rebels led by the al-Nusra Front captured the Christian town of Maaloula, 43 km north of Damascus, The Syrian Army launched a counterattack a few days later, recapturing the town.

On 18 September, the Islamic State of Iraq and the Levant (ISIS) overran the FSA-held town of Azaz in the north. The fighting was the most severe since tensions rose between militant factions in Syria earlier in the year. Soon after ISIS captured Azaz, a ceasefire was announced between the rival rebel groups. However, in early October, more fighting erupted in the town. On 20 September, Alawite militias including the NDF killed 15 civilians in the Sunni village of Shaykh al-Hadid in Hama Governorate. The massacre occurred in retaliation for a rebel capture of the village of Jalma, in Hama, which killed five soldiers, along with the seizure of a military checkpoint which killed 16 soldiers and 10 NDF militiamen. In mid-September, the military captured the towns of Deir Salman and Shebaa on the outskirts of Damascus. The Army also captured six villages in eastern Homs. Fighting broke out in those towns again in October.

On 28 September, rebels seized the Ramtha border post in Daraa Governorate on the Syria Jordan crossing after fighting which left 26 soldiers dead along with 7 foreign rebel fighters. On 3 October, AFP reported that Syria's army re-took the town of Khanasir, which is located on a supply route linking central Syria to the city of Aleppo. On 7 October, the Syrian Army managed to reopen the supply route between Aleppo and Khanasir.

On 9 October, rebels seized the Hajanar guard post on the Jordanian border after a month of fierce fighting. Rebels were now in control of a swath of territory along the border from outside of Daraa to the edge of Golan Heights. The same day, Hezbollah and Iraqi Shiite fighters, backed up by artillery, air-strikes and tanks, captured the town of Sheikh Omar, on the southern outskirts of Damascus. Two days later, they also captured the towns of al-Thiabiya and Husseiniya on the southern approaches to Damascus. The capture of the three towns strengthened the Ba'athist government hold on major supply lines and put more pressure on rebels under siege in the Eastern Ghouta area. On 14 October, SOHR reported that rebels captured the Resefa and Sinaa districts of Deir ez-Zor city, as well as Deir ez-Zor's military hospital.

=== Ba'athist Government offensives (October–December 2013) ===
The Syrian Army along with its allies, Hezbollah and the al-Abas brigade, launched an offensive on Damascus and Aleppo. On 16 October, AFP reported that Syrian troops recaptured the town of Bweida, south of Damascus. On 17 October, the Syrian Ba'athist government's head of Military Intelligence in Deir ez-Zor Governorate, Jameh Jameh, was assassinated by rebels in Deir ez-Zor city. SOHR reported that he had been shot by a rebel sniper during a battle with rebel brigades. On 24 October, the Syrian Army retook control of the town of Hatetat al-Turkman, located southeast of Damascus, along the Damascus International Airport road.

On 26 October, Kurdish rebel fighters seized control of the strategic Yarubiya border crossing between Syria and Iraq from al-Nusra in Al Hasakah Governorate. Elsewhere, in Daraa Governorate, rebel fighters captured the town of Tafas from Ba'athist government forces after weeks of clashes which left scores dead. On 1 November, the Syrian Army retook control of the key city of Al-Safira and the next day, the Syrian Army and its allies recaptured the village of Aziziyeh on the northern outskirts of Al-Safira. From early to mid-November, Syrian Army forces captured several towns south of Damascus, including Hejeira and Sbeineh. Ba'athist Government forces also recaptured the town of Tel Aran, southeast of Aleppo, and a military base near Aleppo's international airport.

On 10 November, the Syrian Army had taken full control of "Base 80", near Aleppo's airport. According to the SOHR, 63 rebels, and 32 soldiers were killed during the battle. One other report put the number of rebels killed between 60 and 80. Army units were backed-up by Hezbollah fighters and pro-Ba'athist government militias during the assault. The following day, Ba'athist government forces secured most of the area around the airport. On 13 November, Ba'athist government forces captured most of Hejeira. Rebels retreated from Hejeira to Al-Hajar al-Aswad. However, their defenses in besieged districts closer to the heart of Damascus were still reportedly solid. On 15 November, the Syrian Army retook control of the city of Tell Hassel near Aleppo. On 18 November, the Syrian troops stormed the town of Babbila. On 19 November, Ba'athist government forces took full control of Qara. The same day, the Syrian Army captured al-Duwayrinah. On 23 November, al-Nusra Front and other Islamist rebels captured the al-Omar oil field, Syria's largest oil field, in Deir al-Zor Governorate causing the Ba'athist government to rely almost entirely on imported oil. On 24 November, rebels captured the towns of Bahariya, Qasimiya, Abbadah, and Deir Salman in Damascus's countryside. On 28 November, the Syrian Army recaptured Deir Attiyeh.

On 2 December, rebels led by the Free Syrian Army recaptured the historic Christian town of Ma'loula. After the fighting, reports emerged that 12 nuns had been abducted by the rebels. However, the FSA disputes this and said that the nuns had been evacuated to the nearby rebel held town of Yabrud due to the Army shelling. In early December, the Islamic Front seized control of Bab al-Hawa border crossing with Turkey, which had been in hands of FSA. The groups also captured warehouses containing equipment delivered by the U.S. In response, the U.S. and Britain said they halted all non-lethal aid to the FSA, fearing that further supplies could fall in hands of al-Qaeda militants. On 9 December, the Army took full control of Nabek, with fighting continuing in its outskirts.

== Rise of the Islamic State (January–September 2014) ==
=== Fighting between ISIL and other rebel groups (January–March 2014) ===
Tension between moderate rebel forces and ISIL had been high since ISIL captured the border town of Azaz from FSA forces on 18 September 2013. Conflict was renewed over Azaz in early October and in late November ISIL captured the border town of Atme from an FSA brigade. On 3 January 2014, the Army of the Mujahideen, the Free Syrian Army and the Islamic Front launched an offensive against ISIL in Aleppo and Idlib governorates. A spokesman for the rebels said that rebels attacked ISIL in up to 80% of all ISIL-held villages in Idlib and 65% of those in Aleppo.

By 6 January, opposition rebels managed to expel ISIL forces from the city of Raqqa, ISIL's largest stronghold and capital of the Raqqa Governorate. On 8 January, opposition rebels expelled most ISIL forces from the city of Aleppo, however ISIL reinforcements from the Deir ez-Zor Governorate managed to retake several neighborhoods of the city of Raqqa. By mid January ISIL had retaken the entire city of Raqqa, while rebels expelled ISIL fighters fully from Aleppo city and the villages west of it.

On 29 January, Turkish aircraft near the border fired on an ISIL convoy inside the Aleppo province of Syria, killing 11 ISIL fighters and an ISIL emir. In late January it was confirmed that rebels had assassinated ISIL's second in command, Haji Bakr, who was al-Qaeda's military council head and a former military officer in Saddam Hussein's army. By mid-February, the al-Nusra Front joined the battle in support of rebel forces, and expelled ISIL from the Deir Ezzor Governorate. By March, the ISIL forces fully retreated from the Idlib Governorate. On 4 March, ISIL retreated from the border town of Azaz and other nearby villages, choosing instead to consolidate around Raqqa in an anticipation of an escalation of fighting with al-Nusra.

=== Ba'athist Government offensives (March–May 2014) ===
On 4 March, the Syrian Army took control of Sahel in the Qalamoun region. On 8 March, Ba'athist government forces took over Zara, in Homs Governorate, further blocking rebel supply routes from Lebanon. On 11 March, Ba'athist Government forces and Hezbollah took control of the Rima Farms region, directly facing Yabrud. On 16 March, Hezbollah and Ba'athist government forces captured Yabrud, after Free Syrian Army fighters made an unexpected withdrawal, leaving the al-Nusra Front to fight in the city on its own. On 18 March, Israel used artillery against a Syrian Army base, after four of its soldiers had been wounded by a roadside bomb while patrolling Golan Heights. On 19 March, the Syrian Army captured Ras al-Ain near Yabrud, after two days of fighting and al-Husn in Homs Governorate, while rebels in the Daraa Governorate captured Daraa prison, and freed hundreds of detainees. On 20 March, the Syrian Army took control of the Krak des Chevaliers in al-Husn. On 29 March, Syrian Army took control of the villages of Flitah and Ras Maara near the border with Lebanon. On 22 March, rebels took control of the Kesab border post in the Latakia Governorate. By 23 March, rebels had taken most of Khan Sheikhoun in Hama. During clashes near the rebel-controlled Kesab border post in Latakia, Hilal al-Assad, NDF leader in Latakia and one of Bashar al-Assad's cousins was killed by rebel fighters.

On 4 April, rebels captured the town of Babulin, Idlib. On 9 April, the Syrian Army took control of Rankous in the Qalamoun region. On 12 April, rebels in Aleppo stormed the Ba'athist government-held Ramouseh industrial district in an attempt to cut the Army supply route between the airport and a large Army base. The rebels also took the Rashidin neighbourhood and parts of the Jamiat al-Zahra district. On 26 April, the Syrian Army took control of Al-Zabadani. According to SOHR, rebels took control of Tell Ahrmar, Quneitra. Rebels in Daraa also took over Brigade 61 Base and the 74th battalion. On 26 April, the FSA announced they had begun an offensive against ISIL in the Raqqa Governorate, and had seized five towns west of Raqqa city. On 29 April, activists said that the Syrian Army captured Tal Buraq near the town of Mashara in Quneitra without any clashes.

On 7 May, a truce went into effect in the city of Homs, SOHR reported. The terms of the agreement include safe evacuation of Islamist fighters from the city, which would then fall under Ba'athist government control, in exchange for release of prisoners and safe passage of humanitarian aid for Nubul and Zahraa, two Shiite enclaves besieged by the rebels. On 18 May, the head of Syria's Air Defense, General Hussein Ishaq, died of wounds sustained during a rebel attack on an air defense base near Mleiha the previous day. In Hama Governorate, rebel forces took control of the town of Tel Malah, killing 34 pro-Assad fighters at an army post near the town. Its seizure marked the third time rebels have taken control of the town.

=== Presidential election (3 June 2014) ===
Syria held a presidential election in Ba'athist government-held areas on 3 June 2014. For the first time in the history of Syria more than one person was allowed to stand as a presidential candidate. More than 9,000 polling stations were set up in Ba'athist government-held areas. According to the Supreme Constitutional Court of Syria, 11.63 million Syrians voted (the turnout was 73.42%). President Bashar al-Assad won the election with 88.7% of the votes. As for Assad's challengers, Hassan al-Nouri received 4.3% of the votes and Maher Hajjar received 3.2%. Allies of Assad from more than 30 countries were invited by the Syrian Ba'athist government to follow the presidential election, including Bolivia, Brazil, Cuba, Ecuador, India, Iran, Iraq, Nicaragua, Russia, South Africa and Venezuela. The Iranian official Alaeddin Boroujerdi read a statement by the group saying the election was "free, fair and transparent". The Gulf Cooperation Council, the European Union and the United States all dismissed the election as illegitimate and a farce. State employees were told to vote or face interrogation. On the ground there were no independent monitors stationed at the polling stations.

It is claimed in an opinion piece that as few as 6 million eligible voters remained in Syria. Due to rebel, Kurdish and ISIL control of Syrian territories there was no voting in roughly 60% of the country.

=== ISIL–Ba'athist government conflict intensifies (June–September 2014) ===
In red: the area controlled by the Islamic State (IS/ISIS/ISIL) proto-state in December 2014

Starting on 5 June, ISIL seized swathes of territory in Iraq in addition to heavy weapons and equipment from the Iraqi Army, some of which they brought into Syria. Ba'athist Government airstrikes targeted ISIL bases in Raqqa and Al-Hasakah in coordination with an Iraqi Army counteroffensive. On 14 June, Ba'athist government forces retook the town of Kessab in northern Latakia Governorate, while rebels took over Tall al-Gomo near the town of Nawa in the Daraa Governorate, as well as reentering the Qalamoun area. On 29 June, ISIL announced the establishment of a new caliphate. Abu Bakr al-Baghdadi was appointed its caliph, and the group formally changed its name to the "Islamic State".

According to the Syrian Observatory for Human Rights, on 17 July ISIL took control of the Shaar oil field, killing 90 pro-Ba'athist government forces while losing 21 fighters. In addition, 270 guards and Ba'athist government-aligned fighters were missing. About 30 Ba'athist government persons managed to escape to the nearby Hajjar field. On 20 July, the Syrian Army secured the field, although fighting continued in its outskirts. On 25 July, the Islamic State took control of the Division 17 base near Raqqa.

On 7 August, ISIL took the Brigade 93 base in Raqqa using weapons captured from their offensive in Iraq. Multiple suicide bombs also went off before the base was stormed. On 13 August, ISIL forces took the towns of Akhtarin and Turkmanbareh from rebels in Aleppo. ISIL forces also took a handful of nearby villages. The other towns seized include Masoudiyeh, Dabiq and Ghouz.

On 14 August, the Syrian Army as well as Hezbollah militias retook the town of Mleiha in Rif Dimashq Governorate. The Supreme Military Council of the FSA denied claims of Mleiha's seizure, rather the rebels have redeployed from recent advances to other defensive lines. Mleiha has been held by the Islamic Front. Rebels had used the town to fire mortars on Ba'athist government held areas inside Damascus.

Meanwhile, ISIL forces in Raqqa were launching a siege on Tabqa airbase, the Syrian Ba'athist government's last military base in Raqqa. Kuwaires airbase in Aleppo also came under fierce attack by ISIL. On 16 August, there were reports that 22 people were killed in the village of Daraa by a car bomb outside a mosque. The bomb was thought to be detonated by ISIL. Also on 16 August, the Islamic State seized the village of Beden in Aleppo Governorate from rebels.

On 17 August, SOHR said that in the past two weeks ISIL jihadists had killed over 700 tribal members in oil-rich Deir ez-Zor Governorate.

On 19 August, a senior figure in ISIL who had helped prepare and plan car and suicide bombs across Syria, Lebanon, and Iraq was killed. Some reports said that he was killed by Hezbollah fighters. There were also several reports that he was killed by the Syrian Army in the Qalamoun region, near the border with Lebanon.

On 19 August, American journalist James Foley was executed by ISIL, who claimed it was in retaliation for the United States operations in Iraq. Boston-based website GlobalPost, for which Foley previously worked, reported they were certain that he was held by pro-government forces before. ISIL also threatened to execute Steven Sotloff, who was kidnapped at the Syria–Turkey border in August 2013. There were reports ISIL captured a Japanese national, two Italian nationals, and a Danish national as well. At least 70 journalists have been killed covering the Syrian war, and more than 80 kidnapped, according to the Committee to Protect Journalists.

On 22 August, the al-Nusra Front released a video of captured Lebanese soldiers and demanded that Hezbollah withdraw from Syria under threat of their execution.

On 23 August, in Raqqa, the Syrian Army took control of the town of Al-Ejeil. ISIL reportedly sent reinforcements from Iraq to the governorate of Raqqa. The Syrian Observatory for Human Rights said at least 400 ISIL fighters had also been wounded in the previous five days in clashes with the Syrian Army and National Defence Force in Raqqa alone. At the same time, several senior UK and US figures urged Turkey to stop allowing ISIL to cross the border to Syria and Iraq. It was around this time that the Americans realized that the Turks had no intention of sealing their side of the border, and so Washington decided to work with the Syrian Kurds to close off the border on the Syrian side. A year later, with the Kurds in control of most of the Turkey–Syria border, and the Syrian army advancing under Russian air support to seal the remainder, the situation was causing great ructions in Ankara.

On the following day, the Islamic State seized Tabqa airbase from Ba'athist government forces. The battle for the base left 346 ISIL fighters and 195 soldiers dead. Prisoners taken by ISIL forces were executed and a video from the mass killing was posted on YouTube. The death toll varied from 120 to 250.

On 26 August, the Syrian Air Force carried out airstrikes against ISIL targets in the Governorate of Deir ez-Zor (for its oil and natural gas resources as well as strategically splitting ISIL territories). This was the first time the Syrian Army had attacked them in Deir ez-Zor, as the Syrian Army pulled out of Raqqa and shifted to Deir ez-Zor in a bid to seize its oil and natural gas resources as well as strategically splitting ISIL territories.

== U.S. intervention and rebel offensives (September 2014–September 2015) ==
=== U.S. intervenes ===
American jets began bombing ISIL in Syria on 23 September 2014, raising U.S. involvement in the war-torn country. At least 20 targets in and around Raqqa were hit, the opposition group Syrian Observatory for Human Rights said. Foreign partners participating in the strikes with the United States were Bahrain, Saudi Arabia, the United Arab Emirates, Qatar and Jordan. The U.S. and "partner nation forces" began striking ISIL targets using fighters, bombers and Tomahawk missiles, Pentagon spokesman Rear Adm. John Kirby said.

U.S. aircraft include B-1 bombers, F-16s, F-18s and Predator drones, with F-18s flying missions off the USS George H.W. Bush (CVN-77) in the Persian Gulf. Tomahawk missiles were fired from the destroyer USS Arleigh Burke (DDG-51) in the Red Sea. Syria's Foreign Ministry told the Associated Press that the U.S. informed Syria's envoy to the U.N. that "strikes will be launched against the terrorist group in Raqqa". The United States informed the Free Syrian Army beforehand of the impending airstrikes, and the rebels said that weapons transfers to the Free Syrian Army had begun.

The United States also attacked a specific faction of al-Nusra called the Khorasan Group, who according to the United States had training camps and plans for attacking the United States in the future.

For its part, Turkey launched an official request to the U.N. for a no-fly zone over Syria. The same day, Israel shot down a Syrian warplane after it entered the Golan area from Quneitra.

By 3 October, ISIL forces were heavily shelling the city of Kobanî and were within a kilometre of the town.

Within 36 hours from 21 October, the Syrian air force carried out over 200 airstrikes on rebel-held areas across Syria and US and Arab jets attacked IS positions around Kobanî. Syrian Information Minister Omran al-Zoubi said the YPG forces in Kobanî had been provided with military and logistical support. Syria reported that its air force had destroyed two fighter jets being operated by IS.

By 26 January, the Kurdish YPG forced ISIL forces in Kobanî to retreat, thus fully recapturing the city. The U.S. confirmed that the city had been cleared of ISIL forces on 27 January, and ISIL admitted defeat in Kobanî city three days later, although they vowed to return.

=== Southern Front (October 2014–February 2015) ===
In February 2014, the Southern Front of the Free Syrian Army formed in southern Syria. Six months later, they started a string of victories in Daraa and Quneitra during the 2014 Quneitra offensive, the Daraa offensive, the Battle of Al-Shaykh Maskin, the Battle of Bosra (2015) and the Battle of Nasib Border Crossing. A Ba'athist government counter-offensive (the 2015 Southern Syria offensive) during this period, that included the IRGC and Hezbollah, recaptured 15 towns, villages and hills, but the operation slowed soon after and stalled. From early 2015, opposition military operations rooms based in Jordan and Turkey began increasing cooperation, with Saudi Arabia and Qatar also reportedly agreeing upon the necessity to unite opposition factions against the Syrian Ba'athist government.

=== Northern Al-Nusra Front and Islamist takeover (October 2014–March 2015) ===
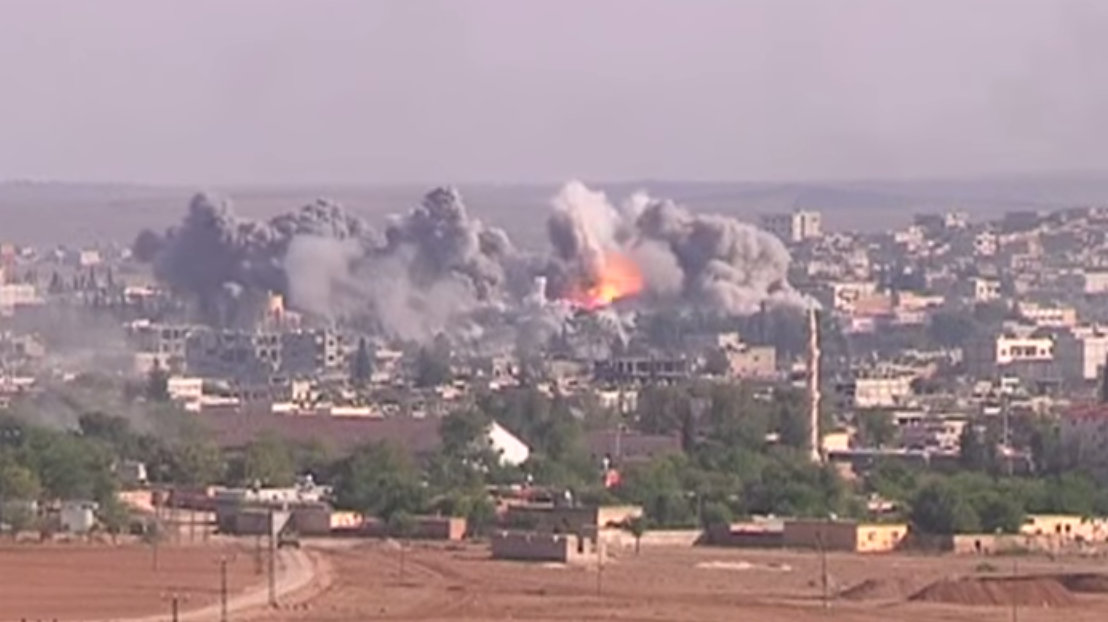
U.S.-led coalition airstrike targeting Islamic State positions during the Siege of Kobanî.

In late October 2014, a conflict erupted between the al-Nusra Front on one side and the western-backed SRF and Hazzm Movement on the other (Al-Nusra Front–SRF/Hazzm Movement conflict). ISIL reportedly reinforced al-Nusra. By the end of February 2015 al-Nusra had defeated both groups, captured the entire Zawiya Mountain region in Idlib province and several towns and military bases in other governorates, and seized weapons supplied by the CIA to the two moderate groups. The significant amount of weapons seized included a small number of BGM-71 anti-tank missiles similar to weapons systems al-Nusra Front had previously captured from Ba'athist government stockpiles such as French MILANs, Chinese HJ-8s and Russian 9K111 Fagots. Reuters reported that this represented al-Nusra crushing pro-Western rebels in the north of the country. According to FSA commanders in northern Syria, however, the elimination of Harakat Hazm and the SRF was a welcome development due to the leaders of those factions allegedly involved in corruption. The Western-backed 30th Division of the FSA remained active elsewhere in Idlib.

By 24 March 2015 the al-Nusra Front dominated most of Idlib province, except for the Ba'athist government-held provincial capital, Idlib, which they had encircled on three sides along with its Islamist allies. On 28 March a joint coalition of Islamist forces, the Army of Conquest, captured Idlib. This left the north largely taken over by Ahrar ash-Sham, al-Nusra Front and other Islamist rebels, with the south of the country becoming the last significant foothold for the mainstream, non-jihadist opposition fighters.

=== Army of Conquest advances in Idlib (April–June 2015) ===
On 22 April, a new rebel offensive was launched in the north-west of Syria and by 25 April, the rebel coalition Army of Conquest had captured the city of Jisr al-Shughur. At the end of the following month, the rebels also seized the Al-Mastumah military base, and Ariha, leaving Ba'athist government forces in control of tiny pockets of Idlib, including the Abu Dhuhur military airport. In addition, according to the Brookings Doha Center, the Army of Conquest coalition was a broad opposition effort to ensure that the Al-Qaeda-affiliated al-Nusra Front was contained, with the rearguard involvement of Western-backed factions being regarded as crucial. Still, according to some, the FSA in northern Syria had by this point all but dissipated. Many of the moderate fighters joined more extremist organizations, such as Ahrar ash-Sham, the largest faction in the Army of Conquest, which led to the subsequent rise of the Islamist Army of Conquest coalition.

Rebel advances led to Ba'athist government and Hezbollah morale plunging dramatically. In north-west Syria these losses were countered by a Hezbollah-led offensive in the Qalamoun mountains north of Damascus, on the border with Lebanon, that gave Hezbollah effective control of the entire area.

=== Resurgent ISIL advance (May–September 2015) ===
Military situation in Syria in August 2015

On 21 May, ISIL took control of Palmyra, a UNESCO World Heritage Site, after eight days of fighting. The jihadists also captured the nearby towns of Al-Sukhnah and Amiriya, as well as several oil fields. Following the capture of Palmyra, ISIL conducted mass executions in the area, killing an estimated 217–329 Ba'athist government civilian supporters and soldiers, according to opposition activists. Ba'athist Government sources put the number of killed at 400–450.

By early June, ISIL reached the town of Hassia, which lies on the main road from Damascus to Homs and Latakia, and reportedly took up positions to the west of it, creating a potential disaster for the Ba'athist government and raising the threat of Lebanon being sucked further into the war.

On 25 June, ISIL launched two offensives. One was a surprise diversionary attack on Kobanî, while the second targeted Ba'athist government-held parts of Al-Hasakah city. The ISIL offensive on Al-Hasakah displaced 60,000 people, with the UN estimating a total of 200,000 would be displaced.

In July 2015, a raid by U.S. special forces on a compound housing the Islamic State's "chief financial officer", Abu Sayyaf, produced evidence that Turkish officials directly dealt with ranking ISIS members.

ISIL captured Al-Qaryatayn from the Ba'athist government on 5 August 2015.

Australia joined the bombing of ISIL in Syria in mid September, an extension of their efforts in Iraq for the past year.

== Russian intervention and Vienna peace talks (30 September 2015–July 2016) ==
Russian military facilities involved in the war in Syria
- Russian Navy
- Russian Aerospace Forces
- Group Special forces

=== Russian intervention ===
On 30 September 2015, at an official request by the Syrian Ba'athist government headed by President Bashar al-Assad, the Russian Aerospace Forces began a sustained campaign of air strikes against both ISIL and the anti-Assad FSA. Initially, the raids were conducted solely by Russian aircraft stationed in the Khmeimim base in Syria. Shortly after the start of the Russian operation, U.S. president Barack Obama was reported to have authorized the resupply of Syrian Kurds and the Arab-Syrian opposition, Obama reportedly emphasizing to his team that the U.S. would continue to support the Syrian opposition now that Russia had joined the conflict.

On 7 October 2015, Russian officials said the ships of the Caspian Flotilla had earlier that day fired 26 sea-based cruise missiles at 11 ISIL targets in Syria destroying those and causing no civilian casualties. On the same day, the Syrian Ba'athist government's ground forces launched the Northwestern Syria ground offensive that in the following few days succeeded in recapturing some territory in northern Hama Governorate, close to the Ba'athist government's coastal heartland in the west of the country.

On 8 October 2015, the U.S. officially announced the end of the Pentagon's $500 million program to train and equip Syrian rebels in an acknowledgment that the program had failed. (However, other covert and significantly larger CIA programs to arm anti-Ba'athist government fighters in Syria continue.)

Two weeks after the start of the Russian campaign in Syria, The New York Times opined that with anti-Ba'athist government commanders receiving for the first time bountiful supplies of U.S.-made anti-tank missiles and with Russia raising the number of airstrikes against the Ba'athist government's opponents that had raised morale in both camps, broadening war objectives and hardening political positions, the conflict was turning into an all-out proxy war between the U.S. and Russia.

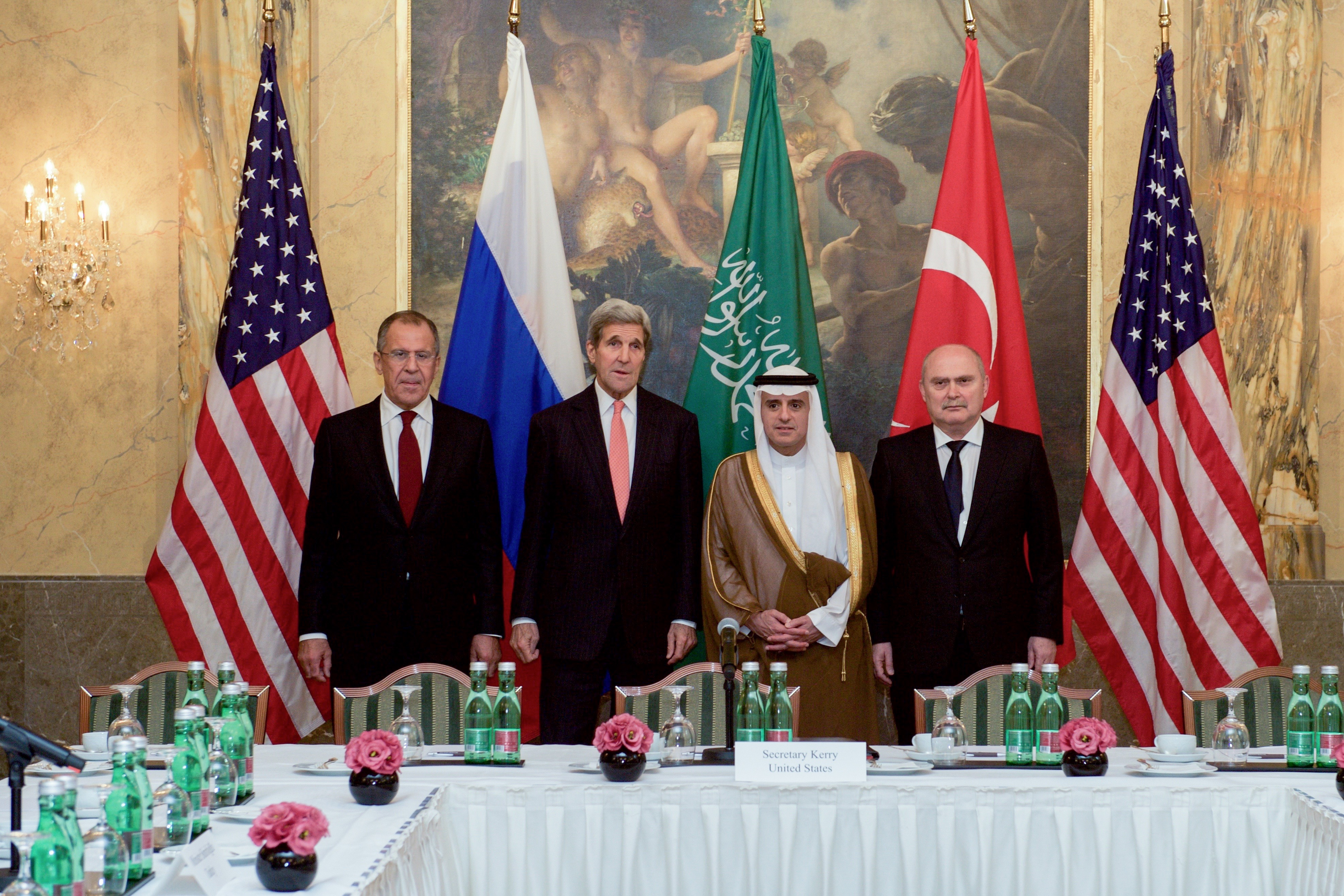
The foreign ministers of Russia, the U.S., Saudi Arabia, and Turkey in Vienna, before a four-way discussion focused on Syria, 29 October 2015

Despite multiple top-ranking casualties incurred by the Iranian forces advising fighters in Syria, in mid-October the Russian-Syrian-Iranian-Hezbollah offensive targeting rebels in Aleppo went ahead.

=== US air and ground strikes; Vienna peace talks; disagreements of Russia, Iran and Western powers (October–November 2015) ===
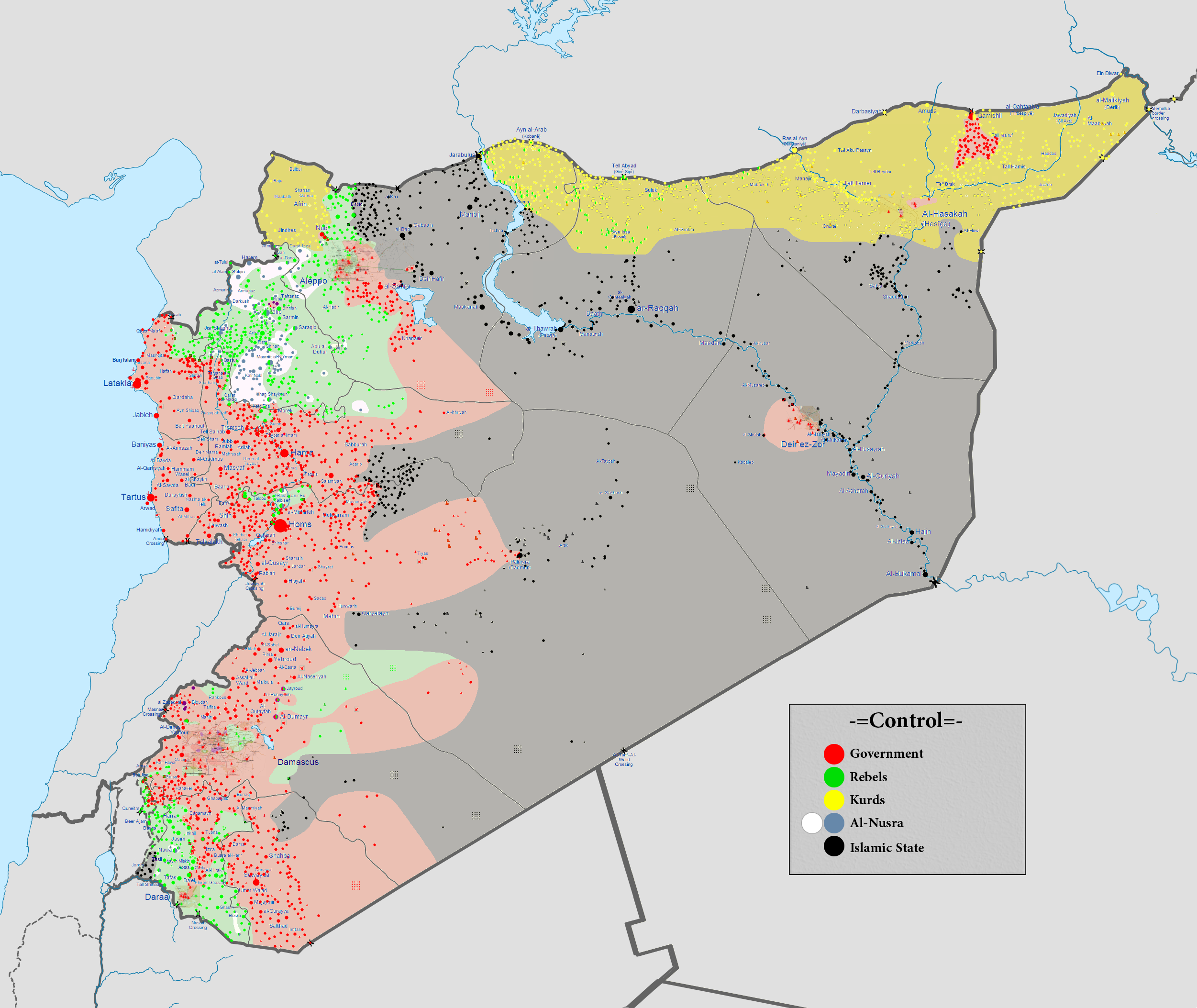
Military situation in Syria in November 2015

Participants in Syrian Civil War

At the end of October 2015, the U.S. Secretary of Defense Ashton Carter signalled a shift in the strategy of the U.S.-led campaign saying there will be more air strikes and ruling in the use of direct ground raids, the fight in Syria concentrating mostly on Raqqa.

On 30 October and two weeks later, Syria peace talks were held in Vienna, initiated by the United States, Russia, Turkey and Saudi Arabia, in which on 30 October Iran participated for the first time in negotiations on Syrian settlement. The participants disagreed on the future of Bashar Assad.

On 10 November 2015, the Syrian Ba'athist government forces completed the operation to break through the ISIL insurgents' blockade of the Kweires air base in Aleppo Province, where Ba'athist government forces had been under siege since April 2013.

In mid-November 2015, in the wake of the Russian plane bombing over Sinai and the Paris attacks, both Russia and France significantly intensified their strikes in Syria, France closely coordinating with the U.S. military. On 17 November, Putin said he had issued orders for the cruiser Moskva that had been in eastern Mediterranean since the start of the Russian operations to "work as with an ally", with the French naval group led by flagship Charles De Gaulle then on her way to the eastern Mediterranean. Shortly afterwards, a Russian foreign ministry official criticised France's stridently anti-Assad stance as well as France's air strikes at oil and gas installations in Syria as apparently designed to prevent those from returning under the Syrian Ba'athist government's control; the Russian official pointed out that such strikes by France could not be justified as they were carried out without the Syrian Ba'athist government's consent. In his remarks to a French delegation that included French parliamentarians, on 14 November, President Bashar Assad sharply criticised France's as well as other Western States' actions against the Syrian Ba'athist government suggesting that French support for Syrian opposition forces had led to the Islamic State-claimed attacks in Paris.

On 19 November 2015, U.S. President Barack Obama, speaking of the Vienna process, said he was unable to "foresee a situation in which we can end the civil war in Syria while Assad remains in power" and urged Russia and Iran to stop supporting the Syrian Ba'athist government. On 20 November 2015, the UN Security Council, while failing to invoke the UN's Chapter VII, which gives specific legal authorisation for the use of force, unanimously passed Resolution 2249 that urged UN members to "redouble and coordinate their efforts to prevent and suppress terrorist acts committed specifically by ISIL...as well as...all other...entities associated with Al-Qaida, and other terrorist groups, as designated by the United Nations Security Council, and as may further be agreed by the International Syria Support Group (ISSG) and endorsed by the UN Security Council". The adopted resolution was drafted by France and co-sponsored by the UK the following day after Russia introduced an updated version of its previously submitted draft resolution that was blocked by the Western powers as seeking to legitimise Assad's authority.

=== Turkey shoots down Russian plane; Syrian army camp bombed; UN Resolution 2254 transitional plan (November–December 2015) ===
On 24 November 2015, Turkey shot down a Russian warplane that allegedly violated Turkish airspace and crashed in northwestern Syria, leading to the Russian pilot's death. Following the crash, it was reported that Syrian Turkmen rebels from Syrian Turkmen Brigades attacked and shot down a Russian rescue helicopter, killing a Russian naval infantryman. A few days later, Russian aircraft were reported to have struck targets in the Syrian town of Ariha in Idlib province that was controlled by the Army of Conquest causing multiple casualties on the ground.
On 2 December 2015, the Parliament of the United Kingdom voted to expand Operation Shader into Syria with a majority of 397–223. That day, two British Tornado aircraft took off from RAF Akrotiri immediately at 22:30, each carrying three Paveway bombs. Two further aircraft were deployed at 00:30 on 3 December, and all aircraft returned by 06:30 without their bombs. Defence Secretary Michael Fallon said that the strikes hit the Omar oil fields in eastern Syria, and that eight more jets (two Tornados and six Typhoons) were being sent to RAF Akrotiri to join the eight already there.

On 7 December 2015, the Ba'athist government of Syria announced that US-led coalition warplanes had fired nine missiles at its army camp near Ayyash, Deir al-Zour province, on the evening prior, killing three soldiers and wounding 13 others; three armoured vehicles, four military vehicles, heavy machine-guns and an arms and ammunition depot were also destroyed. The Ba'athist government condemned the strikes, the first time the Ba'athist government forces would be struck by the coalition, as an act of "flagrant aggression"; the coalition spokesman denied it was responsible. Anonymous Pentagon officials alleged later in the day that the Pentagon was "certain" that a Russian warplane (presumably a TU-22 bomber) had carried out the attack. The claim was denied by the Russian military spokesman who noted that four Western coalition warplanes (other than U.S.) had been spotted over the Deir az-Zor area in Syria on 6 December.

On 14 December 2015, Russia's government news media reported that the Syrian Ba'athist government forces retook a Marj al-Sultan military airbase east of Damascus that had been held by Jaysh al-Islam.

The UN resolution 2254 of 18 December 2015 endorsed the ISSG's transitional plan but did not clarify who would represent the Syrian opposition, while condemning terrorist groups like ISIL and al-Qaeda; it made no mention of the future role of Syrian President Bashar Assad.

=== Syrian army pushes north and retakes Al-Shaykh Maskin in the south-west (January 2016) ===
On 12 January 2016, the Syria Ba'athist government announced that its army and allied forces had established "full control" of the strategically situated town of Salma, a predominantly Sunni village in the mostly Alawite northwestern province of Latakia, and continued to advance north.

On 16 January 2016, ISIL militants launched raid on Ba'athist government-held areas in the city of Deir ez-Zor and killed up to 300 people. Counter-strikes by Russian Air Force fighter jets, in support of Syrian army forces, were reported to take back the areas.

On 21 January 2016, Russia's activity presumably aimed at setting up a new base in the Ba'athist government-controlled Kamishly Airport was first reported; the northeastern town of Qamishli in the Al-Hasakah Governorate had been largely under the Syrian Kurds' control since the start of the Syrian Kurdish–Islamist conflict in the governorate of Al-Hasakah in July 2013. Similar activity by the U.S. forces was suspected in the Rmelan Airbase in the same province, 50 km away from the Kamishly Airport; the area is likewise controlled by the US-backed Kurdish People's Protection Units (YPG).

On 24 January 2016, the Syrian Ba'athist government announced its forces, carrying on with their Latakia offensive, had seized the predominantly Sunni-populated town of Rabia, the last major town held by rebels in western Latakia province; Russian forces were said to have played an important role in the recapture, which threatened rebel supply lines from Turkey.

By 26 January 2016, the Syrian Ba'athist government established "full control" over the town of Al-Shaykh Maskin in the Daraa Governorate, thus completing the operation that had begun in late December 2015. Several analysts considered this a turning of the tide for the Syrian Ba'athist government, citing the significance of military help from Russia, Iran, and Hezbollah, considering that rebels had once controlled about 70% of the province.

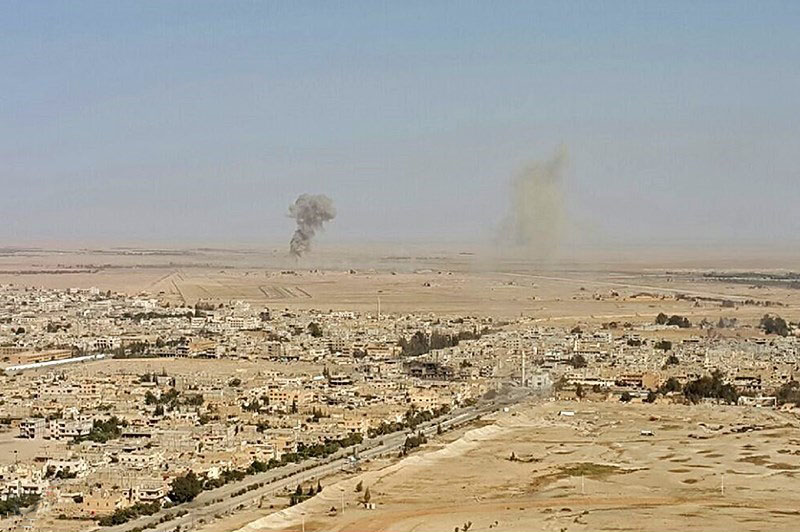
Palmyra offensive in March 2016

=== Partial ceasefire (26 February–July 2016) ===
On 26 February 2016, the United Nations Security Council unanimously adopted resolution 2268 that endorsed a previously brokered U.S.-Russian deal on a "cessation of hostilities". The cease-fire started on 27 February 2016 at 00:00 (Damascus time). The ceasefire does not include attacks on UN-designated terrorist organizations. At the close of February 2016, despite individual clashes, the truce was reported to hold. By the end of March, the Syrian Ba'athist government forces with support from Russia and Iran successfully captured Palmyra from the ISIL.

By early July 2016, the truce was said to have mostly unraveled, violence again escalated, and the fighting between all the major parties to the conflict continued. At the end of July 2016, the fighting between the Ba'athist government and Islamist rebels in and around Aleppo intensified.

== Turkish interventions, Raqqa campaign, Aleppo recaptured, Deir ez-Zor siege broken (August 2016–December 2017) ==
=== SDF advances; Turkish military intervention begins in northern Syria: Operation Euphrates Shield (August 2016–January 2017) ===
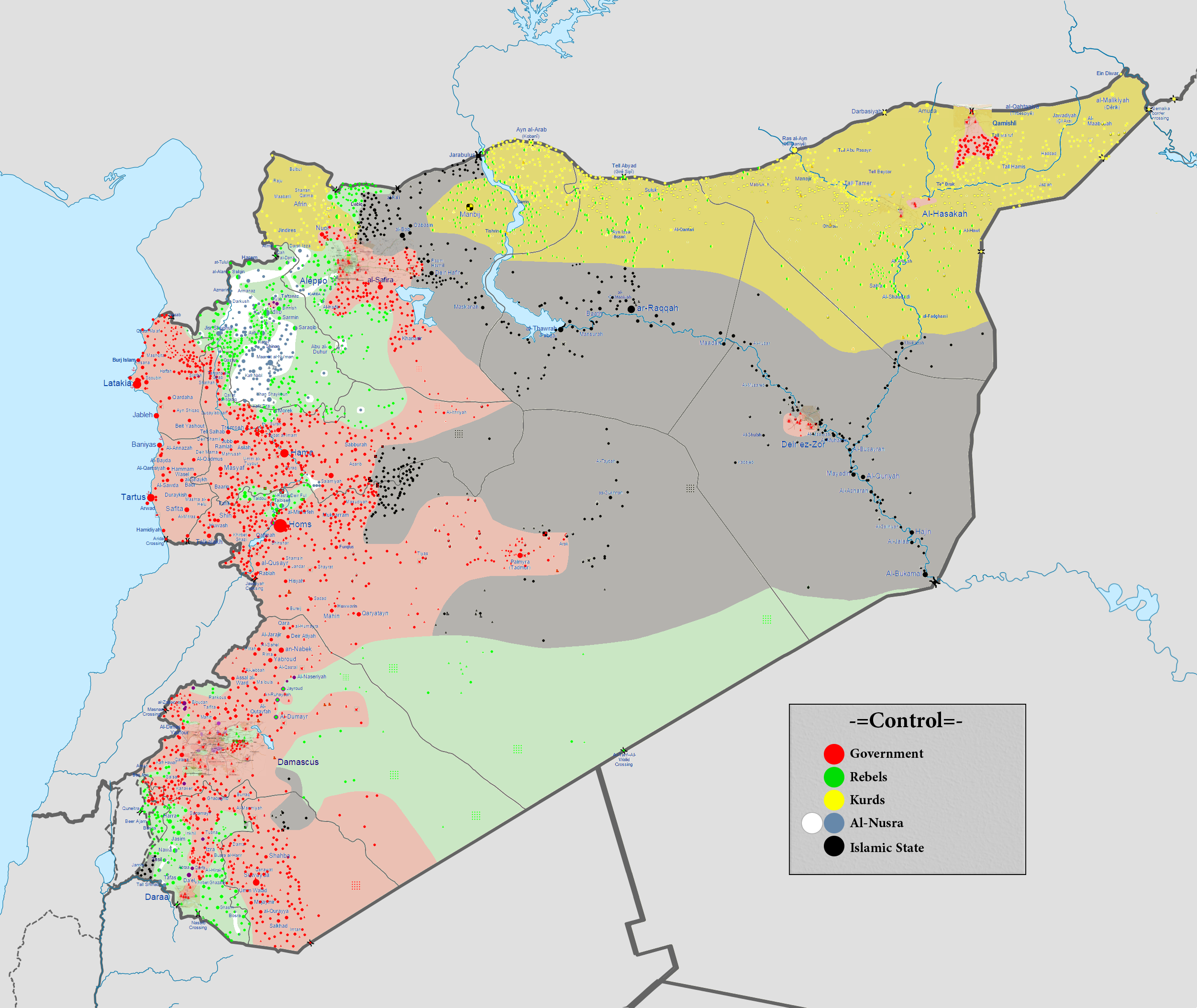
Military situation in August 2016

On 12 August 2016, the Syrian Democratic Forces fully captured the northern city of Manbij from ISIL and some days later announced a new offensive towards Al-Bab, which could eventually connect the Kurdish regions in Northern Syria.

On 16 August the battle of al-Hasakah began with some minor clashes. On 19 August, the Pentagon warned the Syrian Ba'athist government against "interfering with coalition forces or our partners" in the northeastern region near the city of al-Hasakah, adding that the U.S. had the right to defend its troops which were operational in the area. On 22 August, the Kurdish YPG, having captured Ghwairan, the only major Arab neighbourhood in Hasaka that had been in Ba'athist government hands, launched a major assault to seize the last Ba'athist government-controlled areas of the northeastern Syrian city of Hasaka, after a Russian mediation team failed to mend the rift between the two sides; the next day the capture of the city was completed.

On 24 August 2016, Turkey's armed forces invaded Syria in the Jarabulus area controlled by ISIL starting what the Turkish president called the Operation Euphrates Shield, aimed against, according to his statement, both the IS and Kurdish ″terror groups that threaten our country in northern Syria″. The Syrian Ba'athist government denounced the intervention as a "blatant violation of its sovereignty" and said that "fighting terrorism isn't done by ousting ISIS and replacing it with other terrorist organizations backed directly by Turkey". The PYD leader Salih Muslim said that Turkey was now in the "Syrian quagmire" and would be defeated like IS. Speaking in Ankara the same day, U.S. vice president Joe Biden indirectly endorsed Turkey's move and said that the U.S. had made it clear to the Syrian Kurdish forces that they should move back east across the Euphrates, or lose U.S. support.

As Turkish troops and the Turkish-aligned Syrian rebels took control of Jarabulus and moved further south towards the Syrian town of Manbij, they clashed with the Kurdish YPG, which led the U.S. officials to voice concern and issue a warning to both sides. On 29 August, U.S. Defense Secretary Ashton Carter specified that the U.S. did not support Turkey's advance south of Jarabulus. The warning as well as an announcement made by the U.S. of a tentative ceasefire between the Turkish forces and the Kurds in the area of Jarabulus were promptly and angrily dismissed by Turkey. However, combat between the Turkish forces and the SDF died down, and instead Turkish forces moved West to confront ISIL. In the meantime the SDF, including Western volunteers, continued to reinforce Manbij.

At sunset on 12 September 2016, a U.S.-Russian brokered cease-fire came into effect. Five days later, the U.S. and other coalition members′ jets bombed Syrian Army positions near Deir ez-Zor—purportedly by accident — but with Russia contending that it was intentional — killing at least 62 Syrian troops that were fighting ISIL militants. On 19 September the Syrian Army declared that it would no longer observe the truce. Also on 19 September, an aid convoy in Aleppo was attacked with the U.S. coalition blaming the Russian and Syrian governments for the attack and these same governments denying these accusation and instead blaming terrorists for the attack.

On 22 September, the Syrian army declared a new offensive in Aleppo and on 14 December the final rebel stronghold in Aleppo was recaptured by the Syrian Ba'athist government, followed by a ceasefire agreement.

In March 2015, the Syrian Information Minister announced that his government considered recognizing Kurdish autonomy "within the law and constitution". While the region's administration is not invited to the Geneva III peace talks on Syria, or any of the earlier talks, Russia in particular calls for the region's inclusion and does to some degree carry the region's positions into the talks, as documented in Russia's May 2016 draft for a new constitution for Syria. In October 2016, there were reports of a Russian initiative for federalization with a focus on northern Syria, which at its core called to turn the existing institutions of the region into legitimate institutions of Syria; also reported was its rejection for the time being by the Syrian government. The Damascus ruling elite is split over the question whether the new model in the region can work in parallel and converge with the Syrian government, for the benefit of both, or if the agenda should be to centralize again all power at the end of the civil war, necessitating preparation for ultimate confrontation with the region's institutions.

On 26 October 2016, US Defense Secretary Ash Carter said that an offensive to retake Raqqa from ISIL would begin within weeks.

=== Raqqa campaign (November 2016–January 2017) ===
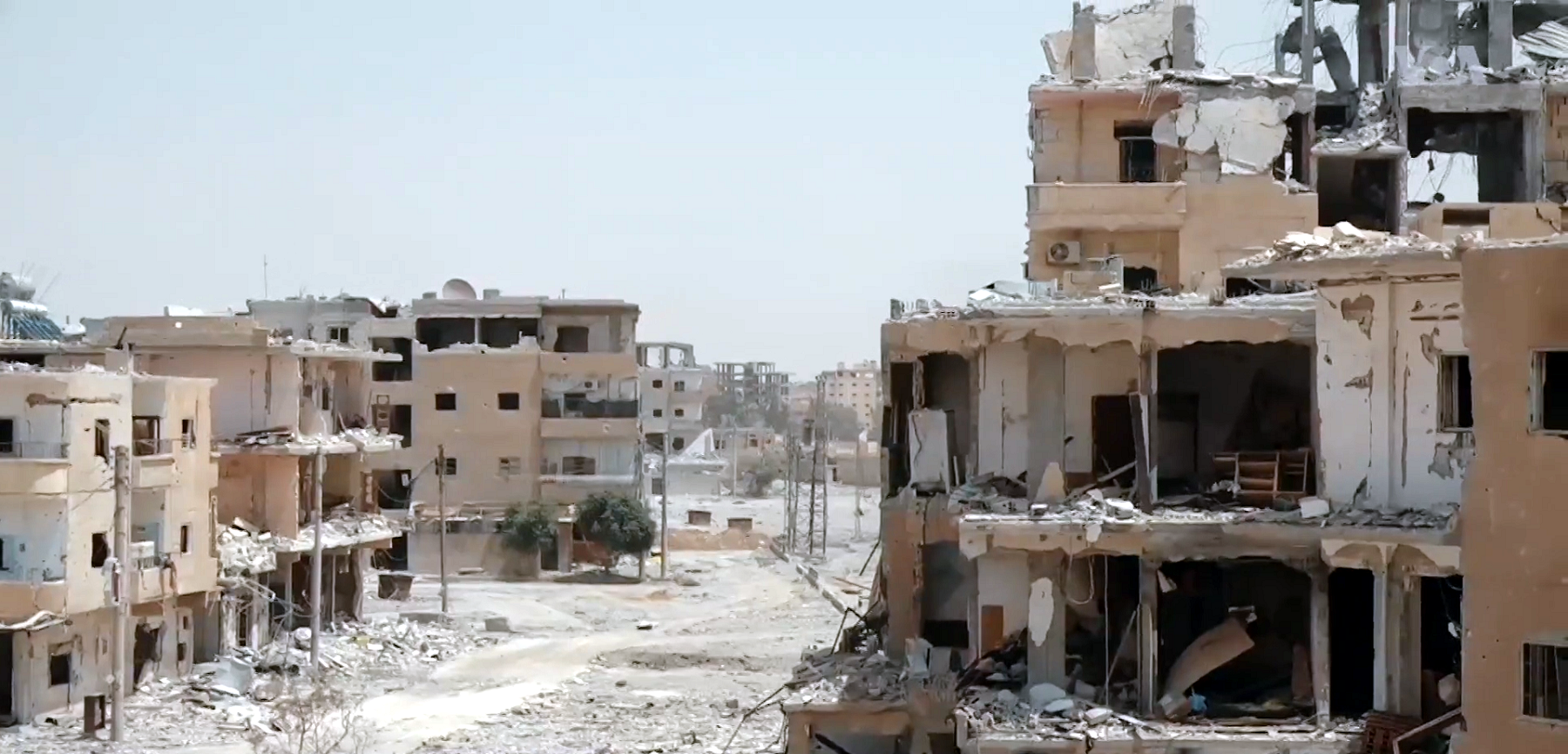
Raqqa suffered extensive damage during the Battle of Raqqa

On 26 October the US Defense Secretary said that an offensive to retake Raqqa from ISIL would begin within weeks. The SDF, using up to 30,000 Arab, Christian and Kurdish troops, and with support from the Western Coalition, undertook an operation codenamed Wrath of Euphrates. By December 2016 it had captured many villages and land west of Raqqa previously controlled by ISIL and by January 2017, much of the land west of Raqqa had been seized and the second phase of the operation was complete.

=== Aleppo recaptured; Russian/Iranian/Turkish-backed ceasefire (December 2016–April 2017) ===
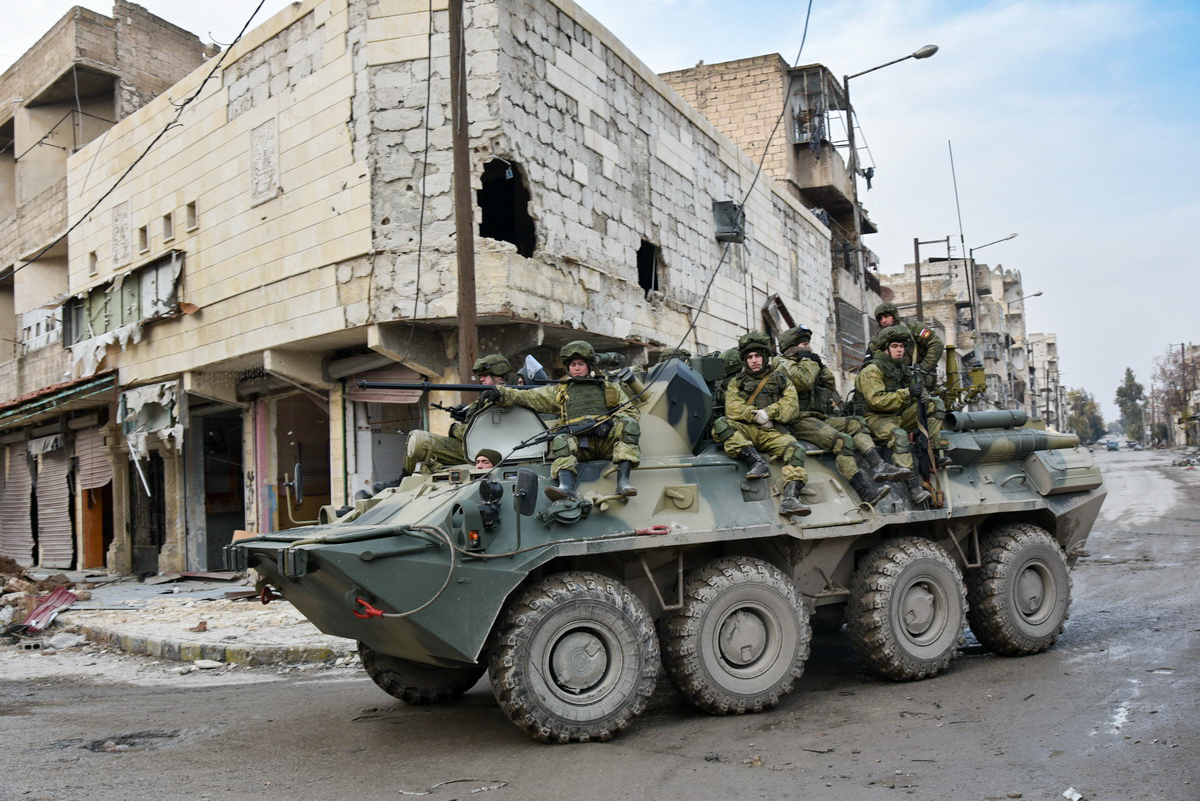
Russian sappers in Aleppo, 23 December 2016

In December 2016, Syrian Ba'athist government forces completely recaptured all of rebel-held parts of Aleppo, ending the 4-year battle in the city. On 29 December Russian President Vladimir Putin announced a new ceasefire deal had been reached between the Syrian Ba'athist Government and opposition groups (excluding UN-designated terrorist groups such as ISIL and Jabhat Fateh al-Sham), with Russia and Turkey acting as guarantors and Iran as a signatory, which came into effect at 00:00 Syrian time (02:00 UTC) on 30 December. Talks were scheduled to be held between the groups in Astana, capital of Kazakhstan, on 15 January. On the same day the United Nations Office for the Coordination of Humanitarian Affairs reported that four million people in Damascus and surrounding areas were without reliable access to water after major supply infrastructure had been targeted, and called upon all parties to guarantee basic services.

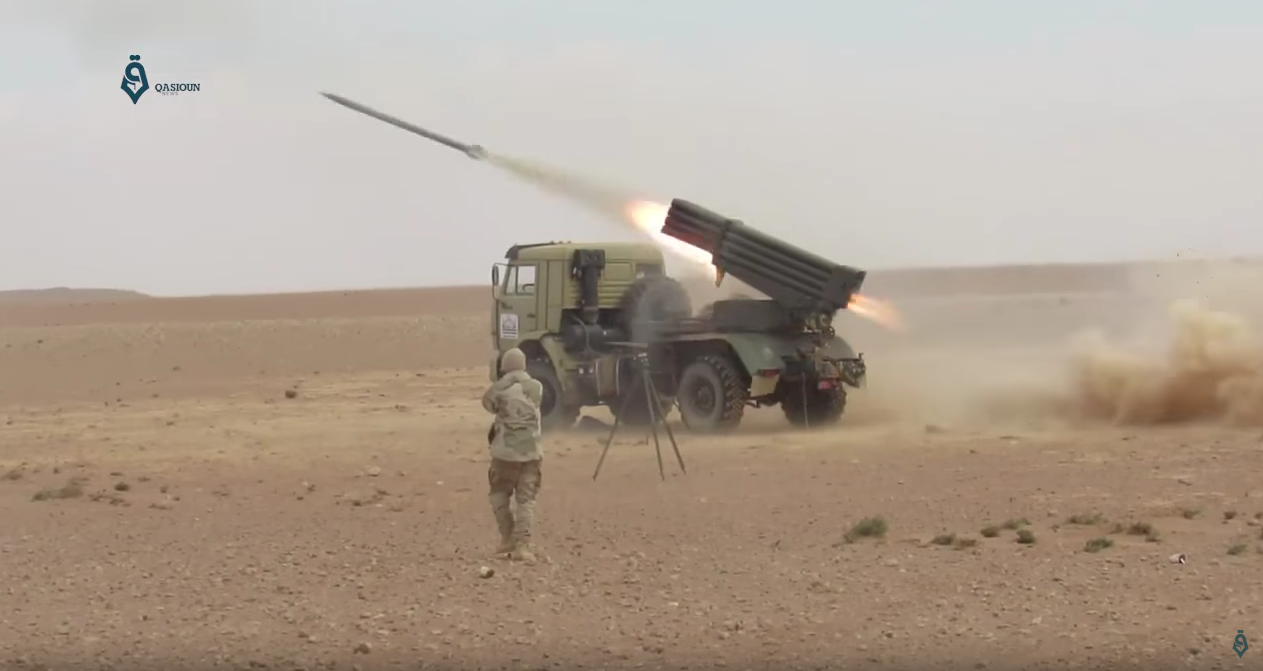
A BM-21 Grad rocket artillery truck of the Lions of the East Army during the 2017 southern Syrian Desert campaign

On 2 January 2017, rebel groups said that they would disengage from planned talks after alleged ceasefire violations by Ba'athist Government forces in the Wadi Barada valley near Damascus. At the end of January, Ba'athist government forces managed to capture Wadi Barada and the water supply of Damascus was restored. On 14 February, the ceasefire between Assad forces and rebels collapsed throughout the country, leading to fresh clashes in various locations and a fresh rebel offensive in Daraa. A new peace conference in Geneva was held on 23 February, the same day as Turkish forces captured Al-Bab from ISIL north-east of Aleppo. Syrian Ba'athist government forces started an offensive east of Aleppo to conquer Dayr Hafir from ISIL and prevent further Turkish advances.

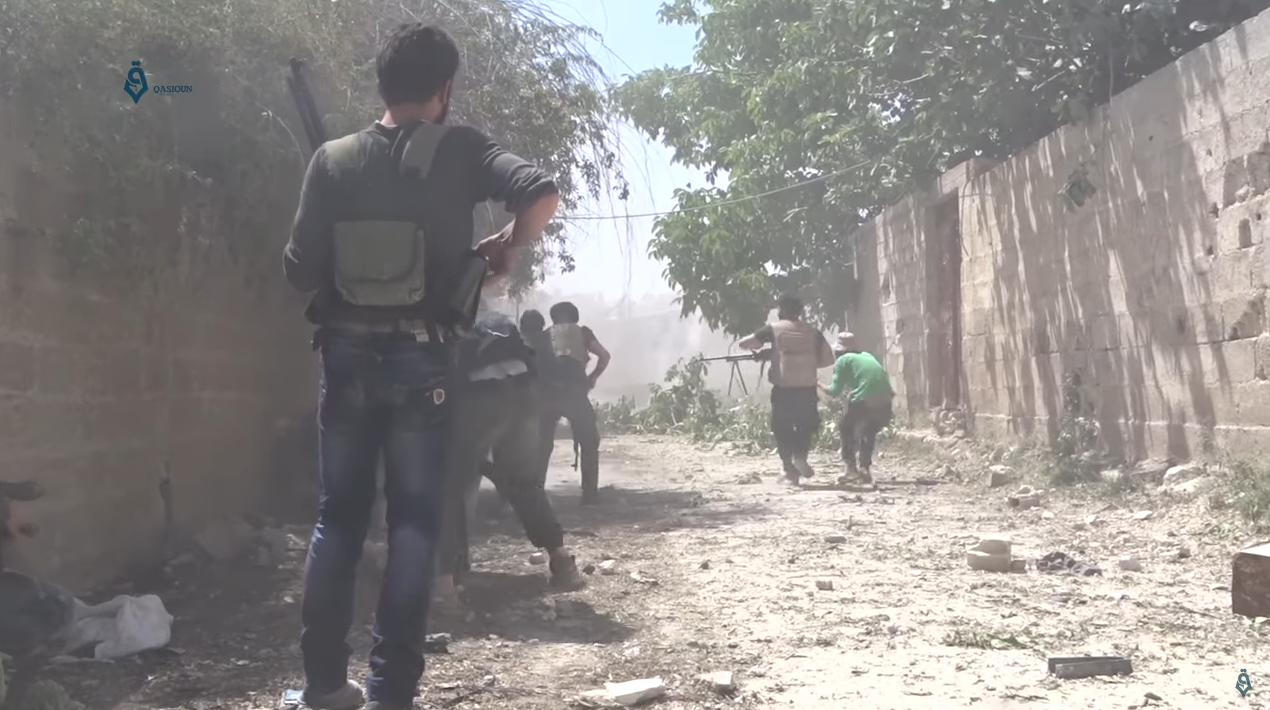
Syrian rebels in combat against Ba'athist government forces in Qaboun, Damascus, April 2017

On 17 March, Syrian military fired S-200 missiles at Israeli jets over Golan Heights. The Israeli military claimed that the Arrow anti-ballistic system intercepted one missile, while the Syrian military claimed that they had downed an Israeli jet. The Russian Foreign Ministry summoned the Israeli ambassador for talks.

The U.N. Commission of Inquiry on Syria reported that on 20 March up to 150 civilians were killed near a school in Raqqa by U.S.-led coalition air strikes. Ba'athist Government forces entered Dayr Hafir, the last stronghold held by ISIL in East Aleppo, and secured it by 23 March. This opened up an opportunity to push south into the Raqqa governorate; however on the same day, an SDF contingent landed on a peninsula west of Raqqa via boats and helicopters in an effort to cut off the Syrian Arab Army from entering the ISIL's de facto capital, Raqqa. On 28 March, an agreement was reportedly brokered by Qatar and Iran for the evacuation for four besieged towns in Syria. The deal involved evacuating the residents of al-Fu'ah and Kafriya, two towns in the Idlib Governorate besieged by rebel forces, in exchange for the evacuation of residents and rebels in Zabadani and Madaya, two towns under siege by Ba'athist government forces in the Rif Dimashq Governorate.

=== Syrian-American conflict; de-escalation zones (April–June 2017) ===
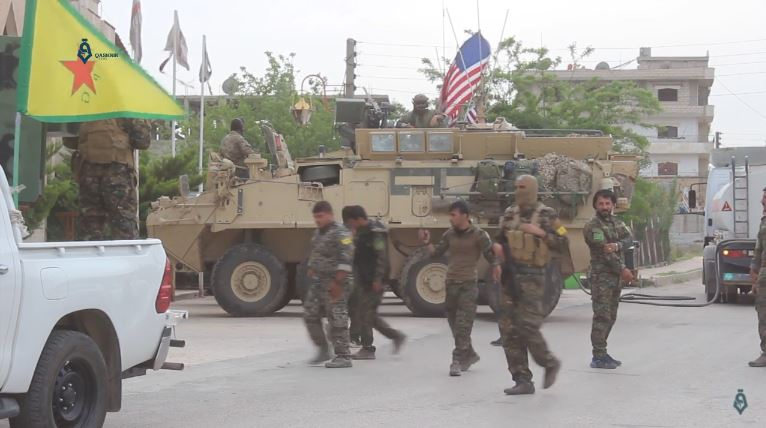
U.S. armored vehicle in Al-Hasakah, northeastern Syria, May 2017

After the chemical attack on Khan Shaykhun, warships of the U.S. Navy launched 59 Tomahawk missiles at the Syrian Ba'athist government's Shayrat Air Base which was said to be the source of the chemical attack. The American attack, taking place on 7 April 2017, was the first officially announced deliberate attack on Syrian Ba'athist government forces. Due to being launched without authorisation from Congress or the UN Security Council, the strike triggered an emergency UNSC meeting. Russian President Putin viewed the U.S. attack as "an act of aggression against a sovereign country violating the norms of international law". The U.S. representative responded that "the moral stain of the Assad regime could no longer go unanswered." American forces struck the Syrian military again on 18 May, when a Syrian army convoy advancing in the vicinity of the border town of al-Tanf, which hosted a US-controlled airbase, came under attack by US fighter jets. Nevertheless, the Syrian Ba'athist government's desert offensive continued and on 9 June Ba'athist government forces secured a part of Syrian–Iraqi border for the first time since 2015.

Military situation in Syria in May 2017

Meanwhile, intense fighting between Ba'athist government forces and rebel groups that began north of Hama on 21 March continued. By 29 March, Ba'athist government forces, which had halted the rebel offensive at the outskirts of Hama, began a counterstrike, and by 16 April had reversed all rebel gains; by the end of April they had captured the towns of Halfaya and Taybat al-Imam.

On 12 April, the agreement to exchange the inhabitants of the rebel-held towns of Zabadani and Madaya with the inhabitants of the pro-Ba'athist government towns of Al-Fu'ah and Kafraya began to be implemented. On 15 April, a convoy of buses carrying evacuees from Al-Fu'ah and Kafriya was attacked by a suicide bomber in Aleppo, killing more than 126 people.

On 24 April, the Turkish Air Force conducted several airstrikes on YPG and YPJ positions near al-Malikiyah. The attacks were condemned by the US.

On 4 May, Russia, Iran, and Turkey signed an agreement in Astana to create four "de-escalation zones" in Syria: the Idlib Governorate, the northern rebel-controlled parts of the Homs Governorate, the rebel-controlled eastern Ghouta, and the Jordan–Syria border. The agreement was rejected by some rebel groups, and the Kurdish Democratic Union Party or PYD also denounced the deal, saying that the ceasefire zones are "dividing Syria up on a sectarian basis". The ceasefire came into effect on 6 May.

=== ISIL siege of Deir ez-Zor broken; CIA program halted; Russian forces permanent (July–December 2017) ===
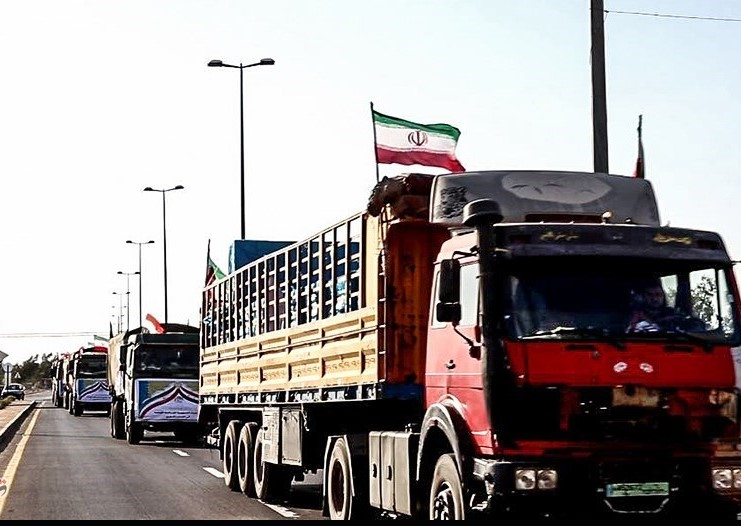
Iranian convoy delivering aid to Deir ez-Zor in September 2017

On 7 July 2017, the U.S., Russia, and Jordan agreed to a ceasefire in part of southwestern Syria, Russia giving assurances that Assad would abide by the agreement. On 19 July it was reported that the U.S. had decided to halt the CIA program to equip and train anti-Ba'athist government rebel groups, a move sought by Russia.

On 5 September the Ba'athist government's Central Syria offensive culminated in the breaking of the three-year ISIL siege of Deir ez-Zor, with active participation of Russian air force and navy. This was followed shortly thereafter by the lifting of the siege of the city's airport.

An analysis released in June 2017 described the Kurdish region's "relationship with the regime fraught but functional" and a "semi-cooperative dynamic". In late September 2017, Syria's Foreign Minister said that Damascus would consider granting Kurds more autonomy in the region once ISIL is defeated.

On 17 October, after over four months of fierce fighting and the U.S.-led coalition's bombardment, the Kurdish-dominated SDF announced they had established full control of the city of Raqqa in northern Syria. At the end of October, the Ba'athist government of Syria said that it still considered Raqqa to be an occupied city that can ″only be considered liberated when the Syrian Arab Army enter[ed] it.″

By mid-November the Ba'athist government forces and allied militia established full control over Deir ez-Zor and captured the town of Abu Kamal in eastern Syria, near the border with Iraq and Iraq's town of al-Qaim, which was concurrently captured from ISIL by the Iraqi government.

On 6 December Russia declared Syria to have been "completely liberated" from ISIL; on 11 December President Putin visited the Russian base in Syria, where he announced that he had ordered the partial withdrawal of the forces deployed to Syria. On 26 December, Russian defence minister Sergey Shoigu said that Russia had set about "forming a permanent grouping" at its naval facility at Tartus and Hmeymim airbase. Two days later, Russian foreign minister Sergey Lavrov said that Russia believed that the U.S. forces must leave Syrian territory completely once remnants of the terrorists were completely eliminated.

== Turkish forces enter conflict; continued civil conflicts; US withdrawal; diplomatic negotiations (January–December 2018) ==
=== Army advance in Hama province and Ghouta; Operation Olive Branch (January–March 2018) ===
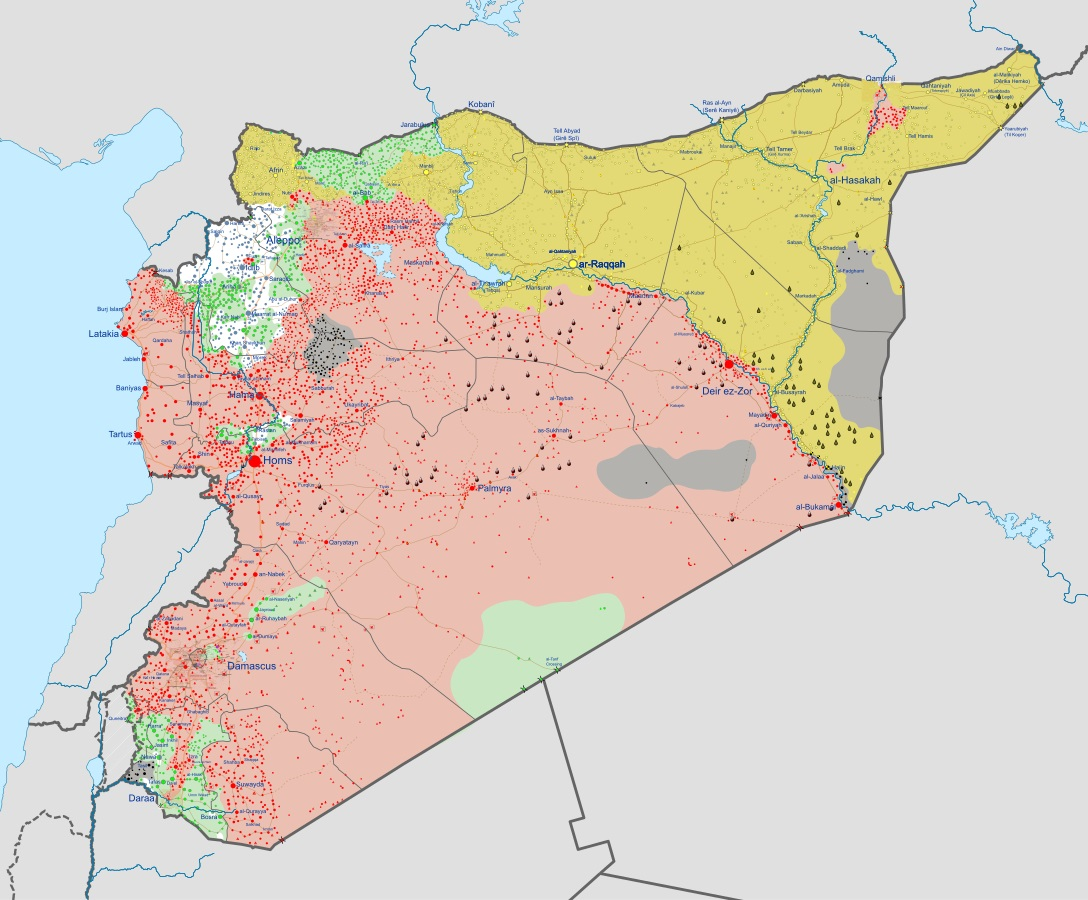
Military situation in Syria in February 2018

On 20 January, the Turkish military began a cross-border operation in the Kurdish-majority Afrin Canton and the Tel Rifaat Area of Shahba Canton in Northern Syria, against the Kurdish-led Democratic Union Party in Syria (PYD), its armed wing People's Protection Units (YPG), and Syrian Democratic Forces (SDF) positions. In January—February 2018, the Syrian Army and its allies continued to advance against the forces of Tahrir al-Sham (HTS) and other rebels in the Hama Governorate.

On 10 February, the Syrian Air Defense Force shot down an Israeli F-16 fighter jet in response to an Israeli cross-border raid on Iranian targets near Damascus through Lebanese airspace.

On 21 February, the Ba'athist government began an operation to capture rebel-held Ghouta east of Damascus; the operation started with an intensive air campaign.

On 18 March, on the 58th day of the Turkish military operation in Afrin, Operation Olive Branch, the Syrian National Army (SNA or FSA), Turkish Armed Forces and disparate rebel groups captured Afrin from the YPG and the YPJ, displacing up to 200,000 people. Shortly after the capture, SNA militants looted parts of the city and destroyed numerous pro-Kurdish symbols as Turkish Army troops solidified control by raising Turkish flags and banners over the city. The battle was seen as an overall strategic victory, because it would open a ground corridor into nearby Idlib province (a stronghold for al-Qaida-linked militants) as well as linking them with other rebel factions that wanted to join the coalition there. Turkey's relationship with the US was stretched to breaking point by the Afrin operation, which pitted the two NATO allies and their Syrian proxies against one another.

=== Douma chemical attack; U.S.-led missile strikes; Southern Syria offensive (April–August 2018) ===
On 7 April 2018, a chemical attack was reported in the city of Douma, with 70 people killed and 500 injured. On-site medics stated the cause of those deaths was exposure to chlorine and sarin gas. The Syrian Ba'athist government denied any use of chemical weapons. Following the incident in Douma, the UN Security Council failed to adopt three competing resolutions on an inquiry into the alleged chemical attack, with Russia and the U.S. clashing over the issue. Following the incident, Syrian Ba'athist government forces entered and established control over the city of Douma, ending the five-year Siege of Ghouta.

On 14 April the U.S., U.K. and France launched missile strikes on multiple Ba'athist government targets in Syria as a response to the suspected chemical attack in Douma.

=== Negotiations between Kurdish regional government and Syrian government ===
On 3 July, NES/SDF authorities removed some YPG flags from cities and towns under their control in Northern Syria. Pro-government media reported this to be as a result of a preliminary agreement being struck between the NES/SDF and Syrian Government, in which the latter allegedly promised to include the Kurdish language as a part of the Syrian national curriculum, consider military service in the YPG as analogous to service in the Syrian Army (for the purposes of veteran status and military pensions), as well as the creation of a permanent post for a Kurdish official in Syria's oil ministry. Several Kurdish officials denied before Kurdistan 24 that such negotiations had taken place, stating that the removal of flags and portraits was part of "an administrative decision to organize and regulate roadside advertising" and had nothing to do with politics.

On 28 July, the Kurdish-led council in northern Syria reported that it had decided to create a roadmap for a "democratic and decentralized Syria" with the Syrian Government, after reportedly meeting with Syrian government officials in Damascus at the invitation of Syrian President Bashar al-Assad.

On 29 July, former PYD co-chair Salih Muslim reported that the atmosphere during the meeting with the Syrian government had been "positive and promising", adding that the government had accepted to discuss the notion of a decentralized Syria. He stated that the SDF was willing to join government offensives in Northwestern Syria and considered militant groups in Idlib to be no different than those in Afrin. He finished by stating that the NES did not wait for permission from international powers to start negotiations with the government, instead simply informed them that they had already started. Later that day, the NES returned over 44 bodies of Syrian Army servicemen killed by ISIL in 2014 to the Syrian Government.

On 30 July, a Syrian Kurdish MP and leader of the Damascus-based 'Syrian Kurds National Initiative', Omar Ose, urged the NES/SDF to enter into full negotiations (as opposed to 'talks') with the Syrian Government. He added that the two sides had managed to agree on 6 of the 10 key issues brought up during the previous two rounds of dialogue.

By the end of July, the two sides had agreed to set up negotiations in "stages". The first stage would cover mutually beneficial and mostly technical matters, such as the restoration of government-sponsored energy, education and health projects, as well as the re-integration of government civil registrations with those within the NES. The second would involve the restoration of government control over the border crossings with Iraq, Turkey and Iraqi Kurdistan, as well as the stationing of government security forces along the state borders currently under the control of the NES. The last stage would involve solving the "major issues" (such as a potential future re-integration of the NES as a whole, within the context of a 'decentralized' system) between the two sides, using the mutual confidence that would be built from the successful completion of the previous stages. The Syrian Democratic Council reportedly voted in favour of negotiations with the Syrian government to this effect. The U.S. envoy Brett McGurk was informed of the ongoing talks and reportedly did not object to the prospect of negotiations between the two sides, but suggested starting out negotiations with a focus on "restoring services".

=== Continuing conflicts, 2018 ===
On 19 April the Syrian army and allied Palestinian groups began an offensive against the Yarmouk camp for Palestinian refugees in Southern Damascus, which had been partially occupied by ISIL. On 21 May, pro-Ba'athist government troops fully recaptured Yarmouk camp, thus allowing the Syrian Arab Army to fully control the capital after 6 years.

On 1 May, the U.S. government announced the U.S.-led coalition's "operations to liberate the final ISIS strongholds in Syria", which would ensure that "populations liberated from ISIS are not exploited by the Assad regime or its Iranian supporters".

In May, Israel launched an extensive strike against Iranian targets in Syria (known as Operation House of Cards) after a series of short military confrontations between Israeli and Iranian forces in Syria.

On 6 July, as a result of the Southern Syria offensive, which had begun in June, the Syrian Army backed by Russian forces reached the border with Jordan and captured the Nasib Border Crossing. By the end of July, the Southern Syria offensive ended, resulting in the complete Syrian Ba'athist government's control of Daraa and Quneitra provinces.

On 8 September 2018, clashes in Quamishli took place between the Autonomous Administration of North and East Syria and Syrian Arab Republic forces yet again. 10+ SAA troops and 7 Asayish fighters were killed. Many more on both sides were injured.

On 17 September Israel hit multiple targets in western Syria. While trying to strike the Israeli planes, Syrian forces shot down a Russian plane, causing the deaths of 15 Russians. The strikes occurred a few hours after a Russo-Turkish agreement to create a demilitarized zone around Idlib Governorate was achieved, which postponed an imminent offensive operation by Syrian Ba'athist government forces and its allies. Russia blamed Israel for the incident; Russian defence ministry's spokesman Igor Konashenkov named the Israeli military as the sole culprit of the accident.

In the aftermath of the strikes, on 24 September 2018, Russian defence minister Sergey Shoygu confirmed that the Syrian army would receive S-300 air-defence missile systems to strengthen Syria's combat air defence capabilities. He added that the previous cancellation of the contract for S-300 delivery in 2013 had been due to Israel's request but following the downing of the Russian aircraft in Syria the situation had changed. The S-300 has modern IFF systems which would prevent the missiles from targeting Russian aircraft.

=== Partial US withdrawal; Turkish buffer zone agreements; Iraq strikes ISIL targets (September–December 2018) ===
On 17 September 2018, Russian president Vladimir Putin and Turkish president Recep Tayyip Erdoğan reached an agreement to create a buffer zone in Idlib.

At a summit in October 2018, envoys from Russia, Turkey, France and Germany issued a joint statement affirming the need to respect territorial integrity of Syria as a whole. This forms one basis for their role as "guarantor nations." The second round of talks occurred around 25 November, but was not successful due to opposition from the Assad regime. At the Astana process meeting in December 2019, a UN official stated that in order for the third round of talks to proceed, co-chairs from the Assad regime and the opposition need to agree on an agenda. The committee has two co-chairs, Ahmad Kuzbari representing the Syrian government, and Hadi Albahra from the opposition. It is unclear if the third round of talks will proceed on a firm schedule, until the Syrian government provides its assent to participate.

While the war is still ongoing, Syrian President Bashar al-Assad said that Syria would be able to rebuild the war-torn country on its own. As of July 2018, the reconstruction was estimated to cost a minimum of US$400 billion. Assad said he would be able to loan this money from friendly countries, Syrian diaspora and the state treasury. Iran has expressed interest in helping rebuild Syria. One year later this seems to be materializing, Iran and the Syrian government signed a deal where Iran would help rebuild the Syrian energy grid, which has taken damage to 50% of the grid. International donors have been suggested as one financier of the reconstruction. As of November 2018, reports emerged that rebuilding efforts had already started. It was reported that the biggest issue facing the rebuilding process is the lack of building material and a need to make sure the resources that do exist are managed efficiently. The rebuilding effort have so far remained at a limited capacity and has often been focused on certain areas of a city, thus ignoring other areas inhabited by disadvantaged people.

On 12 December, the Turkish government announced it would begin operations against Rojava (the Democratic Federation of Northern Syria) "in a few days" in an apparent rebuke of US efforts at ensuring Turkish border security in the area. In response, the Pentagon said that any unilateral military action taken in northern Syria where US forces are operating would be "unacceptable." However, President Trump abruptly announced on 19 December 2018 the withdrawal of all troops from Syria, after which Turkey postponed the planned attack.

Late on 25 December, Israel launched an attack from or across Lebanese air space, "in response to an anti-aircraft missile launched from Syria" according to the IDF; Russia condemned the strikes as provocative and said that they "directly threatened two airliners". Reports from Syria said an arms depot in Qatifah, about 40 km north-east of Damascus, was hit, injuring three soldiers.

On 28 December, Ba'athist government forces were said to be on the outskirts of the strategically important northern city of Manbij, but the city was still held by Kurdish forces and US troops were still there.

On 30 December, the Syrian Ba'athist government officially allowed Iraq to strike ISIL on Syrian territory. Iraq struck ISIL targets in Deir ez-Zor the next day.

The Syrian government put forward a law commonly known as "law 10", which could strip refugees of property, such as damaged real estate. There are also fears among some refugees that if they return to claim this property they will face negative consequences, such as forced conscription or prison. The Syrian government has been criticized for using this law to reward those who have supported the government. However, the government said this statement was false and has expressed that it wants the return of refugees from Lebanon. In December 2018, it was also reported that the Syrian government has started to seize property under an anti-terrorism law, which is affecting government opponents negatively, with many losing their property. Some people's pensions have also been cancelled.

== ISIL attacks continue; US states conditions of withdrawal; fifth inter-rebel conflict (January–September 2019) ==
Ongoing armed conflicts in 2019 Wars, 1,000–9,999 deaths in current or past calendar year

Beginning on 1 January 2019 and lasting through 10 January 2019, Hayat Tahrir al-Sham (HTS) attacked and seized the positions of the National Front for Liberation (NLF) across rebel-held Idlib and Aleppo. On 9 January 2019, a truce was reached between the two factions, with the NLF surrendering their last positions in Idlib to Hayat Tahrir al-Sham and evacuating to areas under the control of the Syrian National Army in Afrin. On 10 January, Hayat Tahrir al-Sham took control of the remaining positions previously held by the NLF.

On 5 January 2019, a Kurdish fighter was killed and two British special forces troops were seriously injured by an ISIL attack near the town of Deir al-Zour. The injured men were evacuated by US forces.

On 6 January 2019, US National Security Adviser John Bolton said, on a trip to Israel and Turkey, that the withdrawal of US troops from Syria depends on certain conditions, including the assurance that the remnants of ISIL forces are defeated and Kurds in northern Syria were safe from Turkish forces. However, Turkey's President Recep Tayyip Erdogan rejected the call to protect Kurdish troops, whom he regarded as terrorist groups. Also on 6 January, the SDF said that they'd caught and arrested two American ISIL fighters, along with suspected fighters from Ireland and Pakistan, who had been planning a terrorist attack on fleeing Syrian civilians. On 10 January 2019, US Secretary of State, Mike Pompeo, said at a joint news conference with his Egyptian counterpart Sameh Shoukry in Cairo that the US would withdraw its troops from Syria while continuing the battle against ISIL, but warned that there would be no US reconstruction aid for areas controlled by Syrian President Bashar al-Assad until Iran and its proxies had left.

On 15 January, a suicide bombing by an ISIL militant next to a US patrol in Kurdish-held Manbij killed 18 people, including four US service personnel, and wounded 18, on the same day that US vice-president Mike Pence claimed that ISIL had been defeated.

On 23 March, after many weeks of sporadic fighting as civilians left Baghuz, the SDF said the five-year "caliphate" was over and ISIL was now defeated in Syria.

In April 2019, United Nations authorities estimated that the war in Syria has caused destruction reaching to about $400 billion.

On 20 April, ISIL reported that they had killed 35 government troops in the Homs and Deir al-Zour provinces; SOHR reported 27 killed, saying that this was the largest attack since ISIL had been declared defeated. Thousands of ISIL fighters and their families captured from Baghuz remained in camps nearby.

=== New outbreaks of civil war, 2019 Northwestern offensive (May–September 2019) ===
Military situation in Syria in September 2019

On 6 May, the Syrian Government, in coordination with the Russian Aerospace Forces, launched a ground offensive against Hayat Tahrir al-Sham, Jaysh al-Izza and National Front for Liberation-held territories in Northwestern Syria, in response to what it stated were repeated attacks on government-held areas, carried out by those groups from within the demilitarized zone.

Following the third northwestern Syria offensive, Syrian Government forces managed to take control over the town of Khan Shaykhun on 19 August, thus creating a rebel pocket on the towns of Kafr Zita, Lataminah and Morek including the Turkish observation post in Morek. Syrian Army captured the entire pocket on 23 August, therefore encircling the observation post in Morek.

By September 2019, according to a Syrian war monitor, over 120 Churches had been damaged or demolished by all sides in Syrian war since 2011.

=== New agreements in mid-2019 ===
On 7 August, the United States and Turkey reached a deal, which would set up a new demilitarized buffer zone in northern Syria.

On 30 August, the Syrian government and Russia announced the launch of a unilateral ceasefire starting from 31 August to stabilise the situation in Idlib.

== Turkish offensive and Second Turkish Buffer Zone; Kurdish collaboration; Death of Abu Bakr al-Baghdadi (October–December 2019) ==
=== Turkish offensive into northeastern Syria; Russian mediation and US power vacuum; Kurdish–Syrian collaboration; Death of Abu Bakr al-Baghdadi (October 2019) ===
Turkey launches a new offensive into Kurdish-controlled northern Syria in October 2019 after U.S. forces pull back. The SDF strikes a deal with the Syrian government to help defend the territory

In October 2019, Kurdish leaders of Rojava, a region within Syria, announced they had reached a major deal with the government of Syria under Assad. This deal was enacted in the wake of the US withdrawal from Syria. The Kurdish leaders made this deal in order to obtain Syria's help in stopping hostile Turkish forces who were invading Syria and attacking Kurds.

In response to the 2019 Turkish offensive into north-eastern Syria, and the US withdrawal of forces, Russia began some efforts at mediation, and arranged for negotiations and the first-ever accordance between the Syrian government in Damascus and the Kurdish-led SDF. Russia also negotiated an agreement to form the Second Northern Syria Buffer Zone, which made new changes to the positions of Syrian, Turkish and SDF forces.

On 5 October, Turkish President Erdogan warned about a full-scale Turkish invasion of northern Syria.

On 7 October, the U.S. government declared that while U.S. forces would not support the Turkish operation, they would withdraw from the area and permit it to take place. The withdrawal was ordered by President Donald Trump, a move that was strongly criticized domestically at the time for its apparent abandonment of the Kurds and for creating a power vacuum in the region Syria and Russia were expected to quickly fill.

On 9 October, Turkish President Erdogan announced that the offensive into north-eastern Syria had begun. In response to the offensive, Russia arranged for negotiations between the Syrian government in Damascus and the Kurdish-led forces. Mazloum Abdi, the Syrian Kurdish commander-in-chief, announced that they are ready to partner with Vladimir Putin (Russia) and Bashar al-Assad (Syria), stating that "We know that we would have to make painful compromises with Moscow and Bashar al-Assad if we go down the road of working with them. But if we have to choose between compromises and the genocide of our people, we will surely choose life for our people."

On 13 October the Syrian government and the Autonomous Administration of North and East Syria (Rojava) made an agreement focused on deterring the Turkish-led offensive in north-eastern Syria, brokered by the Russian government. The details of the agreement was unknown at the time, but there were reports that suggest that the SDF will be incorporated into the Syrian Armed Forces and that northeastern Syria will come under direct rule of the Syrian government in Damascus. According to Syrian Kurdish officials, the deal allowed Syrian government forces to take over security in some border areas, but their own administration would maintain control of local institutions. Syrian troops began entering some key towns in northeastern Syria with Kurdish agreement. Syrian troops took up positions in some areas to oppose Turkish troops that were threatening various Kurdish forces, including entering cities such as Ayn Issa and Tell Tamer. With these deals, the prospects for Kurdish autonomy in the region seemed severely diminished and the Kurds were concerned that the independence of their declared Autonomous Administration of North and East Syria (NES) in Rojava might be severely curtailed.

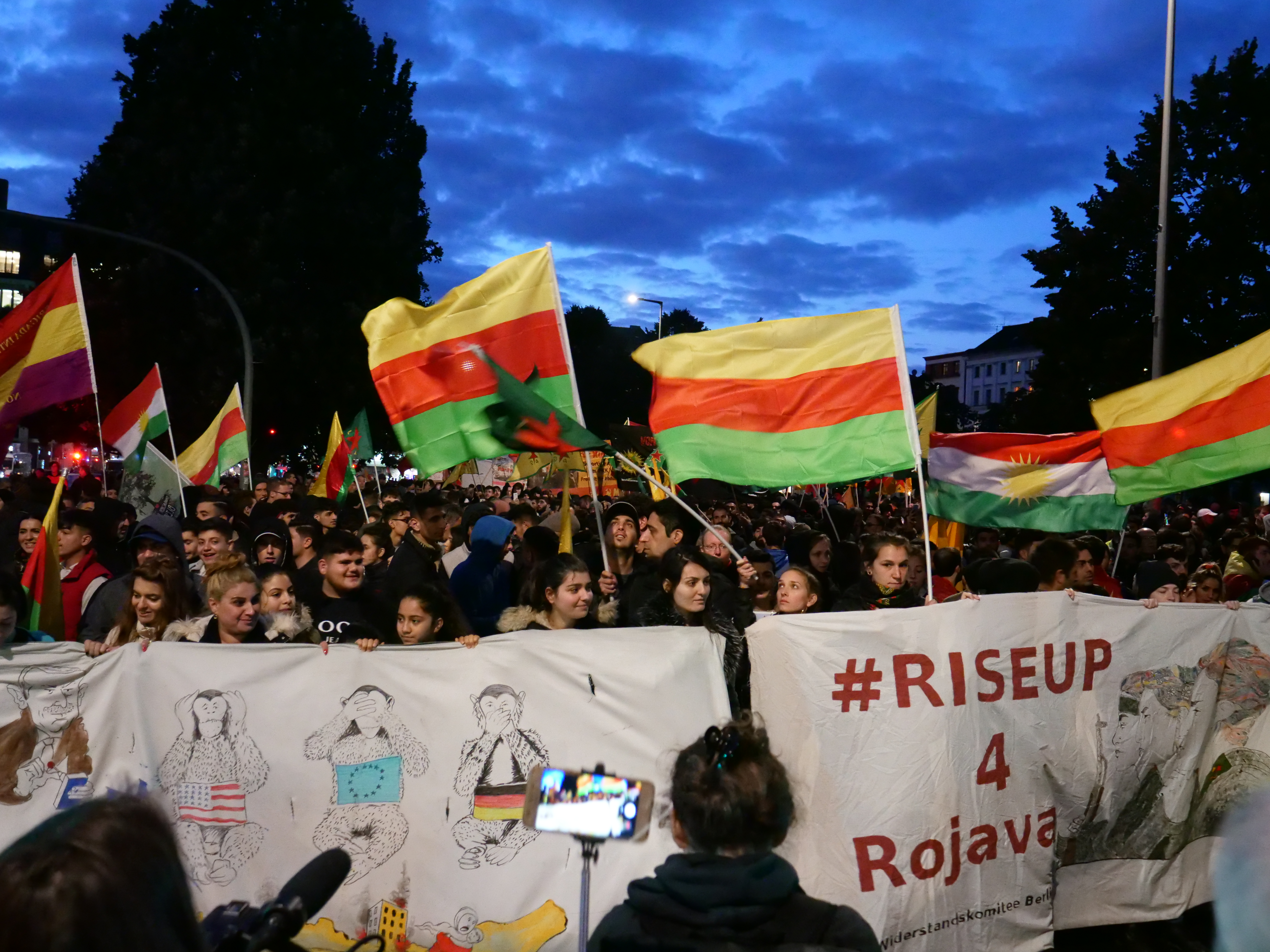
Protest against the 2019 Turkish offensive into north-eastern Syria

Meanwhile, internationally, Turkey's role in NATO began to be scrutinized by analysts, commentators, and war observers in response to the offensive against the US-backed Kurds. Furthermore, there were apparent signs of a schism between Turkey and other NATO members, in which NATO was seen as effectively "powerless" to manage the situation and that the Turkish government was aware that NATO did not hold much leverage over on-the-ground developments in Syria. Due to Turkey's strategic position between Europe and the Middle East, NATO members were in a situation where they had limited themselves to relatively muted criticism. According to the New York Times, the U.S. began reviewing the potential withdrawal of its nuclear weapons from Incirlik airbase under NATO's nuclear sharing. US congressmen, particularly Republican senator Lindsey Graham and Democratic representative Eric Swalwell began calling for possibly suspending Turkey's membership in NATO.

On 15 October, the Russian Ministry of Defense announced that Russian forces had begun patrolling the region along the line of contact between Turkish and Syrian forces, indicating that Russia was now filling the security vacuum from the sudden US withdrawal. Video footage showed Russian soldiers and journalists touring a base that the US had abandoned. Alexander Lavrentiev, Russia's special envoy on Syria, warned that the Turkish offensive into Syria was unacceptable and stated that Russia was seeking to prevent conflict between Turkish and Syrian troops.

==== Second Northern Syria Buffer Zone (October 2019) ====
On 22 October, Russia and Turkey made an agreement via the Sochi Agreement of 2019 to set up a Second Northern Syria Buffer Zone. Syrian President Assad expressed full support for the deal, as various terms of the agreement also applied to the Syrian government.

The demilitarization agreement reportedly included the following terms:

- A buffer zone would be established in Northern Syria. The zone would be around 30 kilometres (19 mi) deep, (Note: Starting from the Syria–Turkey border and going south into Syria) stretching from Euphrates River to Tall Abyad and from Ras al-Ayn to the Iraq-Syria border, but excluding the town of Qamishli, the Kurds' de facto capital. (Note: See the "External links" section in the article Second Northern Syria Buffer Zone, for a link to an article containing an explanatory map of the buffer zone.)
- The buffer zone would be controlled jointly by the Syrian Army and Russian Military Police.
- All YPG forces, which constitute the majority of the SDF, must withdraw from the buffer zone entirely, along with their weapons, within 150 hours from the announcement of the deal. Their withdrawal would be overseen by Russian Military Police and the Syrian Border Guards, which would enter the zone at noon on 23 October.
- The YPG would also withdraw from the cities of Manbij and Tell Rifaat. (Note: Both of these cities are further to the south and not covered by the depth of the buffer zone, but are nonetheless explicitly mentioned in the agreement.)
- Following the YPG withdrawal, joint Russian-Turkish ground patrols would be held in the buffer zone area, but only within 10 kilometres (6.2 mi) from the border and not including Qamishli. (Note: No joint patrols will be held in the remaining part of the buffer zone.) (Note: Later, the Turkish President announced that the patrols would only be held to a depth of 7 km, as opposed to 10. No reason was given for this change.)
- Turkey would retain sole control of the areas it had captured during its offensive between the towns of Tell Abyad and Ras al-Ayn.
- The Syrian Government would construct and man 15 border posts on the Turkish-Syrian border.
- The parties would launch a joint effort to resettle Syrian refugees in a "safe and voluntary manner".
- The parties would agree to "preserve the political unity and territorial integrity of Syria" as well as protect the "national security of Turkey".
- The parties would agree to reaffirm the importance of the Adana Agreement. Russia will facilitate the implementation of the Adana Agreement.

Following the diplomatic breakthrough, the SDF stated that it was willing to merge with the Syrian Army if a political settlement between the Syrian government and the SDF was achieved.

Meanwhile, on 26 October, U.S. Joint Special Operations Command's (JSOC) 1st SFOD-D (Delta Force) conducted a raid into Idlib province on the border with Turkey that resulted in the death of ISIL leader Abu Bakr al-Baghdadi, striking a blow to the terror organization.

=== Russian troops enter Raqqa; Syrian Constitutional Committee; NATO summit; Turkish occupation; continued refugee crisis (October 2019–December 2019) ===
On 28 October, in response to a speech by Assad, the Syrian Democratic Council said it was ready to have positive discussions with the Assad government. They said their focus would shift to stopping the Turkish invasion. Multiple Kurdish groups that were once rivals have begun to seek greater unity against Turkey. Additionally, Syrian Kurdish officials have had some positive discussions with the Assad government, and with local countries such as Saudi Arabia, UAE and Jordan.

On 30 October, the recently negotiated Syrian Constitutional Committee held its inaugural meeting. On 20 November, the committee began operating in order to discuss a new settlement and to draft a new constitution for Syria. This committee comprises about 150 members. It includes representatives of the Syrian government, opposition groups, and countries serving as guarantors of the process such as e.g. Russia. However, this committee has faced strong opposition from the Syrian government. 50 of the committee members represent the government, and 50 members represent the opposition. The committee began its work in November 2019 in Geneva, under UN auspices. However, the Assad government delegation left on the second day of the process.

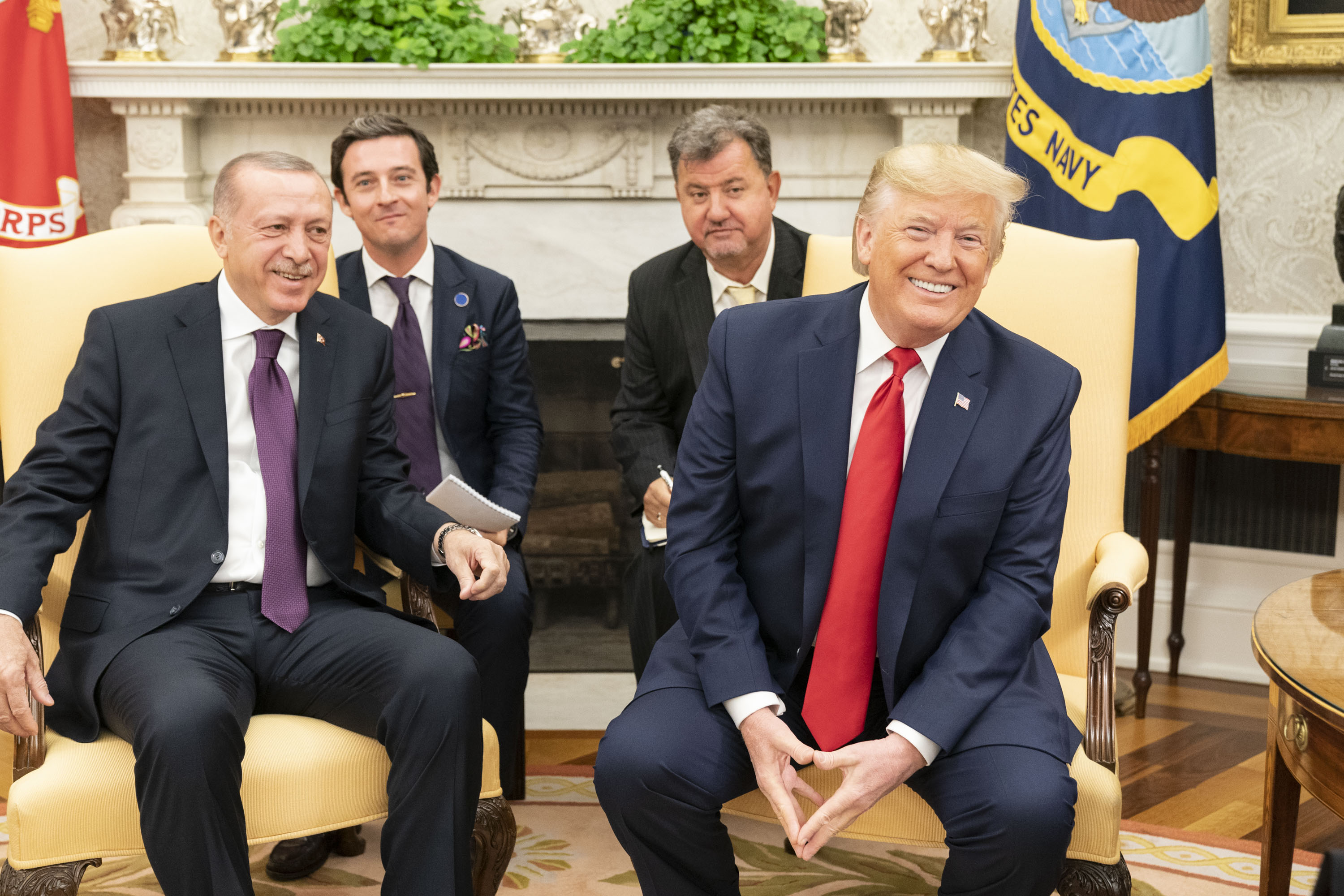
President Donald Trump meets with Turkish President Recep Tayyip Erdoğan in the Oval Office of the White House, 13 November 2019

At the NATO summit in London in early December 2019, French president Emmanuel Macron of France highlighted major differences with Turkey over the definition of terrorism, and said there was little chance this aspect of the conflict could be resolved positively. Macron criticized Turkey strongly for fighting against groups who had been allied with France and the West in fighting terrorism. Numerous issues in resolving the conflict emerged at the NATO summit in London. Turkey proposed a safe zone where Syrian refugees could be relocated, but this idea did not receive support from all parties. Prior to the NATO Summit, there was a meeting at 10 Downing Street of the leaders of France, the UK, Germany and Turkey. One key point that emerged that the Western countries insisted that refugees could only be relocated voluntarily. Meanwhile, there were concerns in NATO about Turkey's growing closeness with Russia.

On 5 December, Erdogan claimed that a four-way summit on Syria was scheduled to occur in Turkey in February 2020 and will include Turkey, Germany, the UK, and France. The same day, United States Defense Secretary Mark Esper said that the United States had completed its military pullback in northeastern Syria and that 600 troops would remain in the rest of Syria. On 12 December, Esper said that Turkey's northern buffer zone had now "stabilized" the situation in northern Syria.

At a meeting in Damascus, Russian and Syrian officials clearly stated their support for Syria regaining control over all of its territory. The United Arab Emirates also expressed official support for Assad. Russia handled security through its own forces deployed in some key towns under the Sochi Agreement. On 9 December, Russian troops entered Raqqa and began distributing humanitarian aid. As part of the buffer zone agreement, Russian military police were carrying out joint patrols and were bringing humanitarian aid to local communities. Meanwhile, the Assad government forged agreements with some opposition groups to return to various local border areas.

Also on 9 December, it was reported that the Russian and Turkish armies had made a deal whereby electricity would be supplied to Tal Abyad by Russia's allies, the Kurdish-led Syrian Democratic Forces (SDF) who now support Assad; while water would be supplied by the Alouk water station that is controlled by Turkish forces. This deal was mainly facilitated by Russian military officials. It was also reported on 11 December that the M4 road to Aleppo would reopen soon, based on an agreement mediated by Russia with Turkey, Turkey's allies in Syria, and the SDF. There were some reports that Turkey has become more involved with local infrastructure in areas that it controls. Some local schools have been provided with some teachers and curriculum components.

Around 10 December, a new round of meetings for the Astana summit process took place in the Kazakh capital Nur Sultan. The meeting includes Russia, Syria, Turkey and Iran. At this meeting Russia, stated that the "safe zone" established by Turkey should not be expanded, as this would not accomplish anything positive for the region. The Astana process was created by Turkey, Iran and Russia in order to find a lasting solution to the conflict. They have examined a process to reform the constitution of Syria via the newly formed Syrian Constitutional Committee. The parties reported that they reached some important understandings at this meeting, including affirming a commitment to work together to respect Syrian territorial integrity. The United States has boycotted this process.

Various efforts were proceeding to rebuild infrastructure in Syria in December 2019. On 12 December, Russia said it would spend $500 million to modernize Syria's port of Tartus. Russia also said it would build a railway to link Syria with the Persian Gulf. Russia would also contribute to recovery efforts by the UN. Syria awarded oil exploration contracts to two Russian firms. On 16 December, Syria announced it was in serious dialogue with China to join China's Belt and Road Initiative designed to foster investment in infrastructure in over one-hundred developing nations worldwide.

==== Continued refugee crisis, Kurdish fears of ethnic cleansing, and UN aid dispute (December 2019) ====
In December 2019, Erdogan stated that Turkey was ready to resettle 1 million Syrian refugees in the northern Syria areas that Turkey had invaded, and that Turkey would pay the costs to do it if necessary, while also calling for more support from the EU and from world organizations. On 9 December, various local accounts indicated that Turkey was moving Syrian refugees into its zone of operations in Northern Syria for the first time. Erdogan said that Turkey was working to settle one million people in the cities of Tal Abyad and Ras Al-Ain in northern Syria. This led to fears of population change or ethnic cleansing. Turkey also began to appoint local mayors and governors in several northern Syrian towns. They also appointed about 4,000 police officers and other local officials, and were providing some basic local services for citizens.

The number of migrants crossing from Turkey into Europe doubled in 2019 to 70,000, raising questions about whether the 2016 EU-Turkey migrant deal is still effective, Deutsche Welle reported, citing a confidential EU report. This caused the Kurds to raise some concerns about displacement of various existing populations and communities. Erdogan claimed that Turkey had spent billions on approximately five million refugees now being housed in Turkey; and also asserted that wealthier nations had done little to address the situation.

A major statement from NGO ACT Alliance found that millions of Syrian refugees remained displaced in countries around Syria. This included around 1.5 million refugees in Lebanon. Also the report found that refugees in camps in north-eastern Syria had tripled in the past year. The UNHCR has also been tracking data on refugees, and maintains an official website to do so. Numerous refugees remained in local refugee camps. Conditions there were reported to be severe, especially with winter approaching. Refugees in Northeast Syria report they had received no help from international aid organizations.

Meanwhile, a diplomatic dispute was occurring at the UN over re-authorization of cross-border aid for refugees. China and Russia oppose the draft resolution that seeks to re-authorize crossing points in Turkey, Iraq, and Jordan; China and Russia, as allies of Assad, seek to close the two crossing points in Iraq and Jordan, and to leave only the two crossing points in Turkey active. All of the ten individuals representing the non-permanent members of the Security Council stood in the corridor outside of the chamber speaking to the press to state that all four crossing points were crucial and must be renewed.

UN official Mark Lowcock had asked the UN to re-authorize cross-border aid to enable aid to continue to reach refugees in Syria. He said there was no other way to deliver the aid that was needed. He noted that four million refugees out of the over eleven million refugees who need assistance are being reached through four specific international crossing points. Lowcock serves as the United Nations Under-Secretary-General for Humanitarian Affairs and Emergency Relief Coordinator and the Head of the United Nations Office for the Coordination of Humanitarian Affairs.

Russia, aided by China's support, vetoed the resolution to retain all four border crossings. An alternate resolution also did not pass. The US strongly criticized the vetoes and opposition by Russia and China.

In regards to the Kurds, the EU held an international conference in mid-December 2019 which condemned any suppression of the Kurds, and called for the self-declared Autonomous Administration in Rojava to be preserved and to be reflected in any new Syrian Constitution. The Kurds are concerned that the independence of their declared Autonomous Administration of North and East Syria in Rojava might be severely curtailed.

Various Kurdish factions that were historical rivals began to meet in order to work together more. Their stated reason was to stand together against Russia and Turkey more strongly if needed. The Russian government has informed the Kurdish factions that they should reconcile and come up with a unified set of demands to clarify to Russia. Various Kurdish factions blamed each other and their council for lack of progress. The national Syrian government sent representatives to northeast Syria to meet with local groups there in order to address their concerns and to emphasize unity and combined effort to address problems. A meeting occurred in Qamishli city, in northeast Syria, that included Syrian national officials, and delegates from Kurdish, Arab, and Syrian figures and forces. Kurdish delegates emphasized their desire to help to protect Syria as a whole. They expressed willingness to have positive discussions with the Assad government.

SDF General Commander Mazlum Abdi met with local leaders of the Wise Committee, which is composed of leaders of local communities and local family groupings. This meeting emphasized the importance on national unity, and the need to stand against Turkish invaders. Abdi called on the US and Russia to help stop Turkey from displacing entire communities and ethnic groups from the areas that it controls. Some reports indicated that meetings between officials of the Assad government and leaders of local political factions went well, and all parties agreed on common goals to improve Syrian society as a whole. The SDF showed some reluctance to integrate into the Syrian Arab Army as requested by the Assad government, though.

Around 10 December, it appeared that Turkey was withdrawing all of its forces away from the al-Shirkark silos, which hold important supplies of wheat, this seemed to be a result of Russian mediation. However, some reports said they later returned to re-occupy that area. Russia said it would pledge to remove Turkish forces from a key highway in northern Syria, and replace them with Russian forces to maintain stability. Russian and Turkish forces are continuing their joint patrols. Questions remained about how much control Turkey had over its proxies, such as the Free Syrian Army.

== Fourth northwestern Syria offensive and Operation Spring Shield (December 2019–April 2020) ==
=== Fourth northwestern Syria offensive begins (December 2019–February 2020) ===
Russia and Syria escalated their attacks against rebel forces in and around the Idlib province by the end of 2019 despite the unilateral ceasefire from August and announced sanctions by the United States. Air raids by the government forces targeted the Ma'arrat al-Nu'man District which resulted in more than 20 killed. In the same week, a bill passed the US senate including new sanctions on Syria, Iran and Russia for their alleged war crimes during the Syrian civil war.

On 19 December 2019, Syrian Army forces and allies launched a ground offensive in the northwestern Syria countryside. The main objective was to capture the M5 road which connects Damascus to Aleppo. In late December 2019, Erdogan stated that Syrian bombing of Idlib had caused new waves of refugees to enter Turkey. Erdogan stated that Turkey could not handle this new influx, and that this influx would be "felt by all European countries".

The Syrian Armed Forces' official statement on the capture of Ma'arrat al-Nu'man in February 2020

After a brief ceasefire, the Syrian Army started to advance towards the city of Ma'arrat al-Nu'man in January 2020. Following rapid advances, government forces reached the city from the eastern, northern and southern outskirts, nearly encircling it. The Syrian Army captured Ma'arrat al-Nu'man on 28 January 2020. It was the first time the Syrian government had control over the city since the battle of 2012.

Turkish President Erdogan on 19 February 2020, declared his intentions of changing the border between Syria and Turkey into a secure place for people from both countries, as Turkey prepared to commence an operation to prevent the Syrian army's attack on opposition-held Idlib province.

In February 2020, the Syrian Army started pushing north towards the city of Saraqib. Meanwhile the offensive displaced over half a million people in northwestern Syria. On 5 February 2020, government forces fully encircled Saraqib, including four Turkish observation posts. After a two day siege, the Syrian Army entered the city and seized it on the same day.

The Army advanced further to the north along the M5 towards Aleppo city. The road was fully under government control on 14 February 2020. In the meantime, Turkey started to send military convoys into Idlib to reinforce their observation points. The Syrian Army's next objective was to secure the western outskirts of Aleppo. Following a major breakthrough on the southern axis, government forces managed to cut off several rebel supply lines. In fear of getting encircled by the Syrian Army, the rebels decided to retreat westwards, leaving the government in control over western Aleppo, including the cities of Haritan and Anadan on 16 February 2020.

On 20 February 2020, the rebels launched a counteroffensive towards Saraqib with Turkish artillery support. At the same time, the Syrian Army shifted their ground advances to the Jabal al-Zawiya and al-Ghab plain regions. According to SOHR, government forces managed to capture 33 towns and villages in 60 hours by 26 February 2020 . The following day, the rebels backed by Turkey had fully recaptured Saraqib from government forces, thus cutting the Damascus-Aleppo M5 highway and lifting the siege of the four encircled Turkish observation points.

=== Balyun airstrikes and Operation Spring Shield (February–April 2020) ===
The offensive in northwestern Syria witnessed a major escalation on 27 February 2020 as a result of pro-government airstrikes which targeted a Turkish mechanized infantry battalion near a post in the town of Balyun. The strikes resulted in the death of at least 34 Turkish soldiers. In response to the Balyun airstrikes, Turkish National Defense Minister Hulusi Akar announced the launch of Operation Spring Shield. The purpose of the operation was in retaliation for the government attack on Turkish soldiers and to halt the Syrian Army advances towards Idlib. The United States and NATO expressed support for Turkey's operation. Turkish Armed Forces and their allies managed to recapture the strategic Zawiya Mountain together with 18 villages, while the Syrian Army captured Saraqib for the second time in a month.

On 5 March 2020, the presidents of Turkey and Russia, Erdoğan and Putin, met in Moscow to talk about the situation in northwestern Syria. They agreed on a ceasefire in the region that was to come into force from 00:00 hrs on 6 March. Meanwhile, Erdogan said that Turkey expected to resettle about 1 million refugees in the "buffer zone" that it controls. Erdogan claimed that Turkey had spent billions on approximately five million refugees now being housed in Turkey; and called for more funding from wealthier nations and from the EU.

== Civil conflict ends, clashes with Turkish forces, economic crisis (May 2020–2022) ==
=== U.S. Caesar Act sanctions, economic crisis, crime wave (May–July 2020) ===
Analysts noted that the upcoming implementation of new heavy sanctions under the U.S. Caesar Act could devastate the Syrian economy, ruin any chances of recovery, and destroy regional stability.

A leading analyst, Julien Barnes-Dacey, director of the Middle East and North Africa Programme at the European Council on Foreign Relations, said:

"Assad is absolutely the prime driver of Syria's ongoing collapse. [But] the US position now appears to be fundamentally driven by great power politics and the goal of ensuring that Russia and Iran can't claim a win. My fear is that Caesar will achieve the exact opposite of its stated goals, fuelling the worst impulses of the Syrian regime and wider conflict. The US self-declared maximum pressure campaign aims to bring the regime to its knees and force its backers to concede defeat but the regime knows how to brutally hold onto power and it's clear that its key backers aren't for moving.

"The Syrian people have been brutalised for a decade now and the country is devastated by conflict but we appear to be staring into the precipice of a dangerous new stage of the conflict ... which risks a devastating new unravelling".

The sanctions severely affected the Syrian economy, especially its construction, finance and energy sectors, and complicated the reconstruction efforts.

On 10 June, hundreds of protesters returned to the streets of Sweida for the fourth consecutive day, rallying against the collapse of the country's economy, as the Syrian pound had plummeted to 3,000:1 Syrian pounds to US dollars within the previous week. On 11 June, Prime Minister Imad Khamis was dismissed by President Bashar al-Assad, amid anti-government protests over deteriorating economic conditions. The new lows for the Syrian currency, and the dramatic increase in sanctions began to raise new threats to the survival of the Assad government.

Military situation in Syria in July 2020

Analysts noted that a resolution to the current banking crisis in Lebanon might be crucial to restoring stability in Syria. Some analysts began to raise concerns that Assad might be on the verge of losing power; but that any such collapse in the regime might cause conditions to worsen, as the result might be mass chaos rather than an improvement in political or economic conditions.

During summer 2020, several Syrian officers were either detained or killed in mysterious circumstances upon and after the implementation of the Caesar Act. For instance, Syrian authorities detained Major general Maan Hussein and seized his assets on 14 June. Moreover, some other officers were assassinated in front of their houses, including: Colonel Ali Jumblat in Yaafour, Brigadier general Jihad Zaal in Deir Ezzor, Brigadier general Thaer Khair Bek in Al Zahera, Damascus, Nizar Zidane in Wadi Barada, Brigadier general Maan Idris in Dummar, Brigadier general Somar Deeb in Al Tijara neighborhood in Damascus, and Brigadier general Haitham Othman, who was claimed to have died of COVID-19. In July 2020, the Syrian authorities led by Prime Minister Hussein Arnous imposed a $100 entry fee for Syrians; due to this, a 17-year-old Syrian girl, Zainab Mohammed Al-Ibrahim, died at the border with Lebanon unable to pay the fee.

Meanwhile, throughout 2020, several recreational drug deliveries (a total of about 27 tons or 162 million Captagon pills, four tons of hashish and other loads of amphetamine), exported via the seaport of Latakia, were intercepted; the production of which was organized by relatives of the al-Assad family. The subsequent sale can be used to obtain foreign currency that was difficult to obtain due to the international sanctions for the Syrian state or its government.

=== Entrenched Russian influence and continued Kurdish–Turkish tensions (July 2020–June 2022) ===
Military situation from March 2020 to November 2024

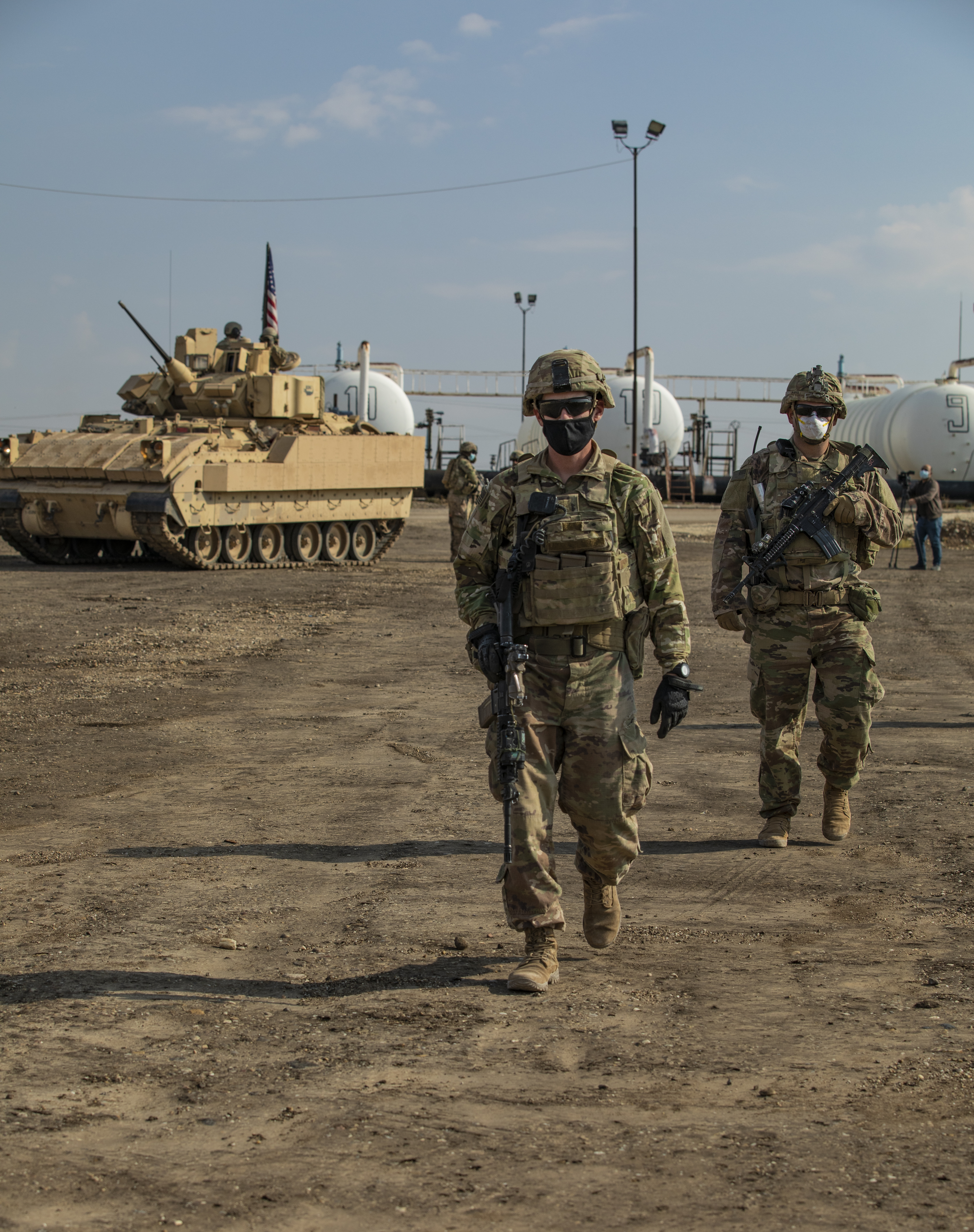
U.S. soldiers deployed in northeast Syria, 12 November 2020

After June 2020, Russia continued to expand its influence and military role in the areas of Syria where the main military conflict was occurring.

As of 2022, the main military threat and conflict faced by Rojava's official defense force, the Syrian Democratic Forces (SDF), are firstly, an ongoing conflict with ISIS; and secondly, ongoing concerns of possible invasion of the northeast regions of Syria by Turkish forces, in order to strike Kurdish groups in general, and Rojava in particular. An official report by the Rojava government noted Turkey-backed militias as the main threat to the region of Rojava and its government.

In May 2022, Middle East Eye and Middle East Monitor reported that Turkish and Syrian opposition officials said that Turkey's Armed Forces and the Syrian National Army were planning a new operation against the SDF, composed mostly of the YPG/YPJ. The new operation is set to resume efforts to create 30-kilometer (18.6-mile) wide "safe zones" along Turkey's border with Syria, President Erdoğan said in a statement. The operation aims at the Tal Rifaat and Manbij regions west of the Euphrates and other areas further east. Meanwhile, Ankara is in talks with Moscow over the operation. Erdoğan reiterated his determination for the operation on 8 August 2022.

== Accords between Syrian government and rebels, conflicts with Turkish forces and proxies (2022–November 2024) ==
=== Discussion by Kurdish groups and Syrian government on joint efforts against Turkey, and ISIS, June 2022–November 2024 ===
On 5 June 2022, the leader of the Syrian Democratic Forces (SDF), Mazloum Abdi, said that forces of the Kurdish government in the Autonomous Administration of North and East Syria (AANES) were willing to work with Syrian government forces to defend against Turkey, saying "Damascus should use its air defense systems against Turkish planes." Abdi said that Kurdish groups would be able to cooperate with the Syrian government, and still retain their autonomy. The joint discussions were a result of the negotiation processes that had begun in October 2019.

In July 2022, the SDF and the official Syrian military forged active plans to coordinate actively together to create defense plans to guard against invasion by Turkey. The SDF said that they felt that the main threat to Kurdish groups was an invasion by Turkey.

In August 2022, Kurdish forces focused mainly on fighting ISIS forces in the areas around Kurdish portions of Syria.

In September 2022, a new UN report stated that the Syrian Civil War was in danger of flaring up again. Paulo Sérgio Pinheiro, chair of the UN's Syria commission, said that "Syria cannot afford a return to larger-scale fighting, but that is where it may be heading." The UN report described increased arrests and crackdowns on opposition leaders. The UN also said it had been totally unable to deliver any supplies during the first half of 2022.

In summer 2022, there were reports that Syrian diplomats had met with Turkish diplomats, at an international conference. In late 2022, Turkish President Erdogan expressed openness to meeting with Assad. Some analysts attributed this new attitude to Erdogan's desire to improve his popularity with voters, ahead of upcoming elections; and also, to improve Turkey's relations with Russia, which has forces deployed in Syria.

Various rights advocates expressed concerns that improved relations between Syrian President Assad and Turkish President Erdogan might eventually be detrimental to Syrian refugees in Turkey. Also, there were reports of an increase of attacks on Syrian immigrants living in Turkey. In October 2022, some NGOs stated that thousands of Syrian refugees in Turkey were being forcibly returned to Syria by Turkish forces, and specifically being forced to relocate to the northern zone of Syria controlled by Turkey. The Commander of the SDF, Mazloum Abdi, expressed concerns that normalization of relations between Assad and Erdogan might be detrimental to Kurdish communities.

In October 2022, the United Nations called for a "nationwide ceasefire" in Syria. The U.N. special envoy for Syria, Geir Pedersen, met with Syria's foreign minister in Damascus; afterwards, Pedersen said that Syria's economic situation is "extremely difficult as close to 15 million people are in need for humanitarian assistance." One of the main local military conflicts was an internal conflict, amongst factions of the Turkish-backed Syrian National Army (SNA).

Various Kurdish leaders indicated that any military cooperation with the Syrian government was separate from political negotiations, and that military cooperation would not necessarily solve all political questions on a permanent basis. In December 2022, Mazloum Abdi said:

"In the absence of a political solution, the objective of our military coordination with the Syrian army is to prevent a Turkish occupation of Syria. We believe that Syrians must unite in the face of external interference and fight to preserve Syria's territorial integrity."

As of 2023, active fighting in the conflict between the Syrian government and rebel groups had mostly subsided, but there were occasional flareups in Northwestern Syria. In early 2023, reports indicated that the forces of ISIS in Syria had mostly been defeated, with only a few cells remaining in various remote locations.

As of 2023, Turkey was continuing its attacks on various militias within Syria, consisting mostly of the YPG. One stated goal was to create "safe zones" along Turkey's border with Syria, according to a statement by Turkish President Erdoğan. The operations were generally aimed at the Tal Rifaat and Manbij regions west of the Euphrates and other areas further east. President Erdoğan openly stated his support for the operations, in talks with Moscow in mid-2022.

In early 2023, Turkish-backed militias carried out military attacks against Kurdish militias, using tanks and artillery.

In March 2023, the Syrian government declared that it would not seek any reconciliation with Turkey, unless Turkey withdrew all of its proxy forces from Syria. This statement occurred in response to diplomatic efforts by Russia, which sought to encourage Syria and Turkey to seek reconciliation, and restoration of diplomatic ties.

In August, the 10th of August movement was launched, a new pan-Syrian protest movement. In late August, a general strike in Suweida sparked protests across southern Syria.

=== Stalemate in civil conflict, renewed relations with Assad government ===
Military situation before the opposition offensives in late 2024. Territories held by Tahrir al-Sham (white) and the Syrian government (red).

As of 2023, active fighting in the conflict between the Syrian government and rebel groups had mostly subsided, but there were occasional flareups in Northwestern Syria. In early 2023, reports indicated that the forces of ISIS in Syria had mostly been defeated, with only a few cells remaining in various remote locations.

As of 2023, Turkey was continuing its support for various militias within Syria, consisting mostly of the SNA, which periodically attempted some operations against Kurdish groups such as the YPG/YPJ. One stated goal was to create "safe zones" along Turkey's border with Syria, according to a statement by Turkish President Erdoğan. The operations were generally aimed at the Tal Rifaat and Manbij regions west of the Euphrates and other areas further east. President Erdoğan openly stated his support for the operations, in talks with Moscow in mid-2022.

In 2023, various sources reported that the war had settled into the status of a low-level conflict, which had mainly achieved a stalemate. The Council on Foreign Relations stated:

The war whose brutality once dominated headlines has settled into an uncomfortable stalemate. Hopes for regime change have largely died out, peace talks have been fruitless, and some regional governments are reconsidering their opposition to engaging with Syrian leader Bashar al-Assad. The government has regained control of most of the country, and Assad's hold on power seems secure. Meanwhile, the Syrian people are suffering an economic crisis, and a massive earthquake at the start of 2023 cast much of the population in the north into further despair.

The United States Institute for Peace stated:

Twelve years into Syria’s devastating civil war, the conflict appears to have settled into a frozen state. Although roughly 30% of the country is controlled by opposition forces, heavy fighting has largely ceased and there is a growing regional trending toward normalizing relations with the regime of Bashar al-Assad. Over the last decade, the conflict erupted into one of the most complicated in the world, with a dizzying array of international and regional powers, opposition groups, proxies, local militias and extremist groups all playing a role. The Syrian population has been brutalized, with nearly a half a million killed, 12 million fleeing their homes to find safety elsewhere, and widespread poverty and hunger. Meanwhile, efforts to broker a political settlement have gone nowhere, leaving the Assad regime firmly in power.

=== Conflict with Turkish forces ===
In 2023, the main military conflict was not between the Syrian government and rebels, but rather between Turkish forces and factions within Syria. In late 2023, Turkish forces continued to attack Kurdish forces, in the region of Rojava, Starting on 5 October 2023, the Turkish Armed Forces launched a series of air and ground strikes targeting the Syrian Democratic Forces in Northeastern Syria. The airstrikes were launched in response to the 2023 Ankara bombing, which the Turkish government alleges was carried out by attackers originating from Northeastern Syria.

=== October 2023 ===
- On 12 October 2023, Israel struck the Damascus and Aleppo airports.
- On 14 October 2023, an Israeli airstrike temporarily took the Damascus airport out of service.
- On 22 October 2023, Israeli airstrikes simultaneously hit the Damascus and Aleppo airports, damaging the runways.
- On 25 October 2023, after rockets were fired from Syria into the Golan Heights, Israeli fighters targeted the Aleppo airport and several military sites.

== Renewed rebel offensive and collapse of Assad's regime (November 2024–present) ==
=== Opposition Rapid Offensive; SAA in retreat (November–December 2024) ===
Syrian opposition offensives that overthrew Assad's regime in 11 days

On 27 November 2024, a coalition of Syrian opposition groups called the Military Operations Command led by Hay'at Tahrir al-Sham (HTS) launched a lightning offensive against the pro-government Syrian Arab Army (SAA) forces in Aleppo, Idlib, Hama and Homs Governorates in Syria which was followed by other rebel offensives from the Southern Front, the SDF and the Syrian Free Army. On 28 November, it was reported that Russian and Syrian warplanes were bombing rebel positions in response to the offensive. Additionally, Iranian state media said that Islamic Revolutionary Guards Corps (IRGC) Brigadier General Kioumars Pourhashemi, a senior Iranian military adviser in Syria, was killed in Aleppo. On 29 November, rebel forces entered Aleppo, restarting conflict over the city. On 30 November, several more settlements were seized, with the rebels entering Hama and Homs. On 7 December 2024, the outskirts of Damascus were reached by rebel forces.

=== Fall of Damascus; End of the Assad's regime (December 2024) ===
On 8 December, Syrian opposition forces captured Damascus after Bashar al-Assad's forces withdrew and subsequently announced the collapse of Assad's regime.

Despite the collapse of the Assad regime Turkish-backed forces in northern Syria have continued to attack the Autonomous Administration of North and East Syria. On 10 December, according to reason.com, "....Kobane came under attack again. With the fall of Bashar al-Assad's government in Damascus and the uncertainty over what comes next, Turkey has been seeking an opportunity to wipe out its Kurdish opponents and carve out a puppet state in Syria's north. With air cover from the Turkish Air Force, militias known as the Syrian National Army (SNA) overran the nearby city of Manbij and marched toward Kobane." In December 2024, the factions supported by Turkey announced they would discontinue the ceasefire with groups supported by the US, such as Syrian Democratic Forces. Al-Monitor reported that Kurdish soures had told them that the SNA "informed the SDF... that it would be returning to 'a state of combat against us,'... The sources said negotiations between the SDF and the SNA had 'failed' and that 'significant military buildups' in areas east and west of... Kobani on the Turkish border were being observed."

On 26 December 2024, former Syrian major general Mohammad Kanjo Hassan was found hiding in a hole in the town of Khirbet al-Ma'zah, he was arrested along with 20 of his loyalists.

=== Events and conflicts after fall of Assad (December 2024–present) ===
On 5 January 2025, major fighting occurred between pro-Turkish militias, and Kurdish forces.

On 29 January 2025, Military Operations Command spokesman Hassan Abdul Ghani announced that Ahmed al-Sharaa, the former head of HTS, had been appointed President of Syria at the Syrian Revolution Victory Conference.

Between 6 March and 10 March, violent confrontations erupt between remnants of Assad-aligned forces and units loyal to the interim government. In response, the interim authorities initiate a crackdown in predominantly Alawite towns, with reports indicating that over 1,000 people were killed during the operation. Similarly, attacks on minorities, in particular Druze peoples, have shaken confidence in the post Assad Government

On 11 March 2025, the interim government and the Syrian Democratic Forces reached an agreement to incorporate the Kurdish-led group into the new governing structure.

In July 2025, heavy fighting broke out between Druze and Bedouin in Suweida, killing dozens. The Syrian government deployed regular soldiers and Interior Ministry units there. According to Israeli officials, this was done to crack down on the Druze minority. The IDF attacked Syrian Armed Forces vehicles from the air and with URVs in order to prevent their arrival to the area. In a response, Prime Minister Benjamin Netanyahu and Defense Minister Israel Katz cited the need to protect the Druze religious minority due to their close ties to Israeli Druze as well as assuring the security of Israel's borders by preventing the deployment of weaponry and Syrian military forces in the area.

== See also ==
- Belligerents in the Syrian civil war
- Cities and towns during the Syrian civil war
- Control of cities during the Syrian civil war
- Timeline of the Arab Spring

=== Events within Syrian society ===
- Cities and towns during the Syrian civil war
- Civil uprising phase of the Syrian civil war
- Inter-rebel conflict during the Syrian civil war
- 2010s in Syria political history
- Rojava conflict

=== Historical aspects ===
- American-led intervention in the Syrian civil war
- Foreign involvement in the Syrian civil war
- Hezbollah involvement in the Syrian civil war
- Rojava conflict (Democratic Federation of Northern Syria) – Kurdish participation in the war
- Russian involvement in the Syrian civil war
- Spillover of the Syrian civil war
- Syria chemical weapons program
- Syrian–Turkish border clashes during the Syrian civil war
- Terrorism in Syria
- Syrian civil war in popular culture

=== Lists and statistical records ===
- Casualty recording
- Human rights violations during the Syrian civil war
- List of aviation shootdowns and accidents during the Syrian civil war
- List of terrorist incidents in Syria
- Belligerents in the Syrian civil war
- List of Syrian defectors
- Refugees of the Syrian civil war

=== Specific offensives ===
- Northwestern Syria offensive (April–June 2015) ("Battle of Victory")

=== Peace efforts and civil society groups ===
- Syrian civil war ceasefires
- Syrian peace process
- Syrian Democratic Council
- Syrian diaspora
- Syrian Observatory for Human Rights
- White Helmets (Syrian civil war)

=== History of other local conflicts ===
- 2023 American–Middle East conflict
- Iraqi insurgency (2011–2013)
- Islamist uprising in Syria from 1976 until 1982
- List of wars involving Syria
- War in Iraq (2013–2017)
