= Dead Cities =

Group of abandoned settlements in northwest Syria

Ancient Villages of Northern Syria
UNESCO World Heritage Site
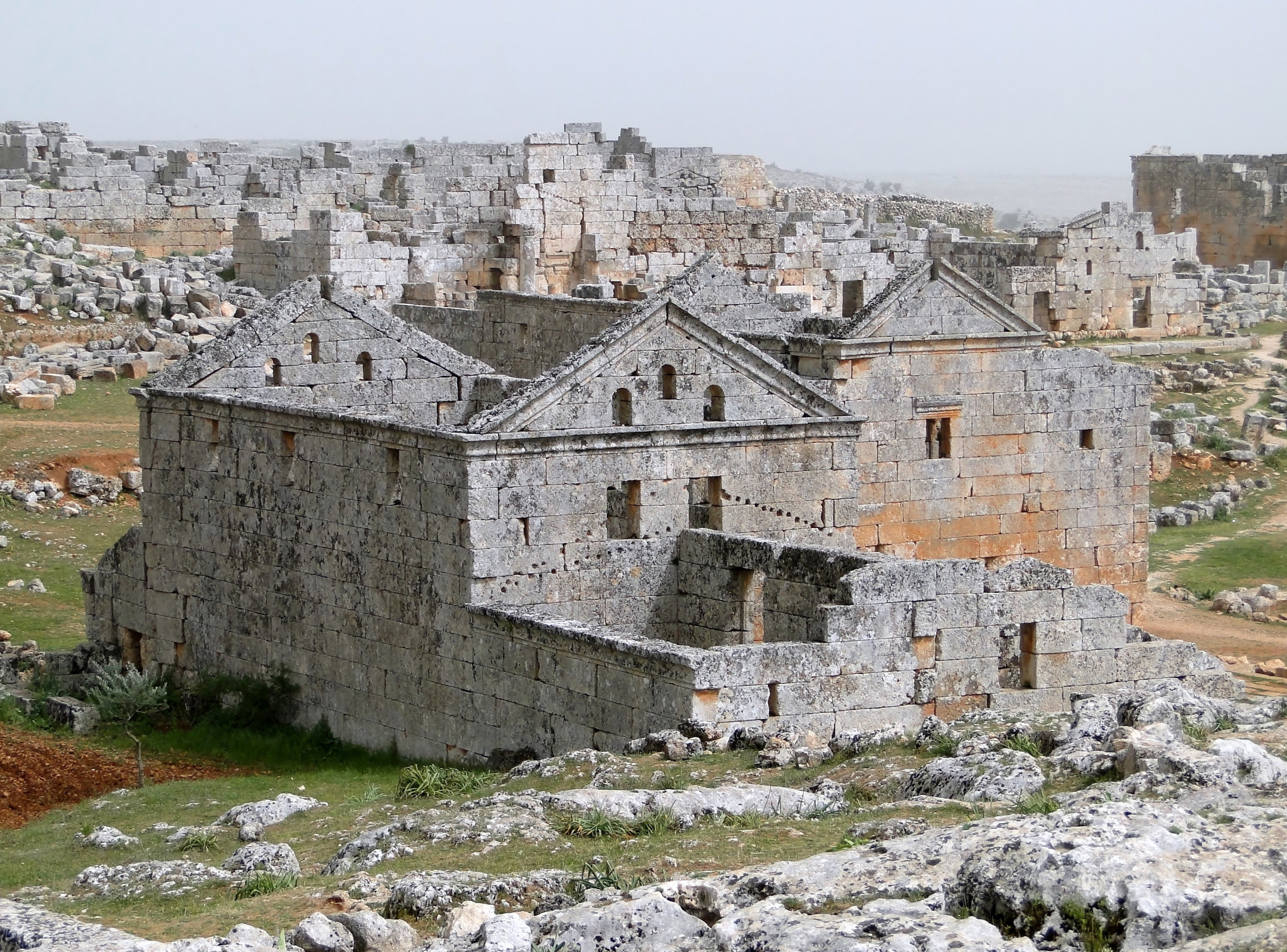
- View of Serjilla

- Location within Syria Location within West and Central Asia
- Location: Limestone Massif, Syria
- Includes: Jebel Sem'an; Qal'at Sem'an; Kafr Nabu; Sinkhar; Jebel Zawiyé; Ba'uda; Rouweiha; Jebel al-A'la; Qalb Lozé; Jebel Barisha; Deirouné; Jebel Wastani; Kafr Aqareb
- Criteria: Cultural: (iii)(iv)(v)
- Reference: 1348
- Inscription: 2011 (35th Session)
- Endangered: 2013–present
- Area: 12,290 ha (30,400 acres)
- Coordinates: 36°20′3″N 36°50′39″E

The Dead Cities (Arabic: المدن الميتة, romanized: al-mudun al-mayyita) or Forgotten Cities (Arabic: المدن المنسية, romanized: al-mudun al-mansiyya) are a group of 700 abandoned settlements in northwest Syria between Aleppo and Idlib. Around 40 villages grouped in eight archaeological parks situated in north-western Syria provide an insight into rural life in Late Antiquity and during the Byzantine period. Most of the villages, which date from the 1st to 7th centuries, were abandoned between the 8th and 10th centuries. The settlements feature the well-preserved architectural remains of buildings such as dwellings, pagan temples, churches, cisterns and bathhouses. Important dead cities include the Church of Saint Simeon Stylites, Dahis, Serjilla, Ruweiha and al Bara.

The Dead Cities are situated in an elevated area of limestone known as Limestone Massif. These ancient settlements cover an area 20–40 km (12–25 mi) wide and some 140 km (87 mi) long. The Massif includes three groups of highlands: the first is the northern group of Mount Simeon and Mount Kurd; the second middle group is the group of Harim Mountains; the third southern group is the group of Zawiya Mountain.

== History ==
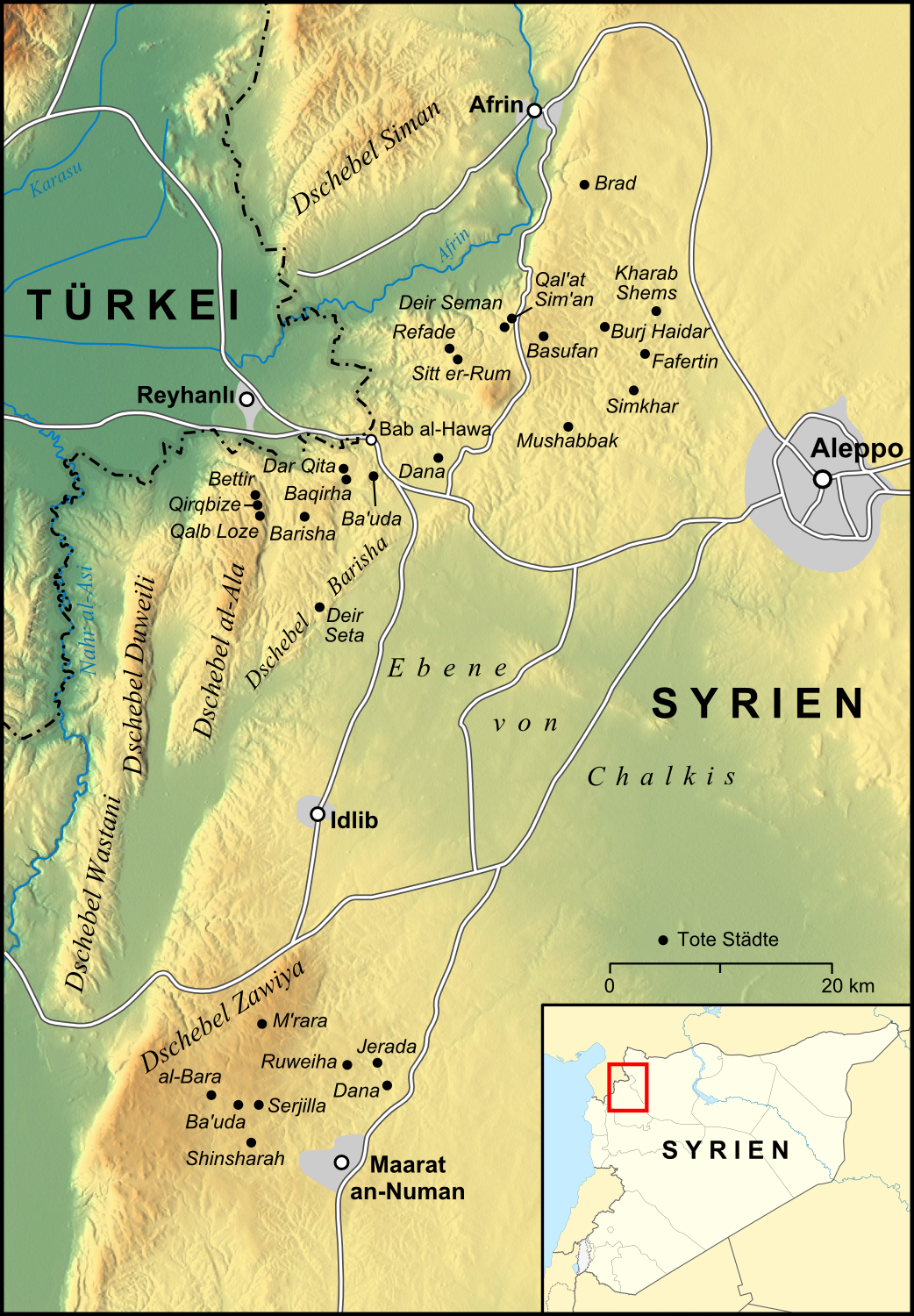
The location of Dead Cities in the northwestern parts of Syria

Chris Wickham, in the authoritative survey of the post-Roman world, Framing the Early Middle Ages (2006) argues that these were settlements of prosperous peasants which have few or no specifically urban features. The impressive remains of domestic architecture are the result of the prosperity of peasants who benefited from a strong international trade in olive oil at the end of Antiquity.

Another argument is that these were prosperous cities that flourished because they were located along major trade routes in the Byzantine Empire, and not merely prosperous peasant settlements. After conquest by the Arabs, the trade routes changed, and as a result, these towns lost the majority of the business which fostered their economies. On this view, settlers eventually abandoned their towns and headed for other cities that were flourishing under the Arabs and the Umayyads as increasing urbanisation took its toll.

The ancient villages of the Dead Cities illustrate the transition from the ancient pagan world of the Roman Empire to Byzantine Christianity.

The Dead Cites were inscribed as a UNESCO World Heritage Site in 2011, under the name of "Ancient Villages of Northern Syria". The Dead Cities were the 1348th site to be added to UNESCO's World Heritage Site list. The Dead Cities have been on the Endangered UNESCO list since 2013, meaning the site was not endangered for only two years.

Before the Syrian Civil War most sites had become easily accessible, the majority of the dead cities were well-preserved and tourists could access the sites quite freely, though some of the Dead Cities are quite difficult to reach without a guide (there is a guidebook by Abdallah Hadjar with a detailed map that is useful for finding the lesser known sites; The Church of St Simeon Stylites and Other Archaeological Sites in the Mountains of Simeon and Halaqa. However, the Syrian Civil War has caused Syrian refugees to flee to these sites in hopes of finding shelter. In various areas, refugees have repurposed the stone ruins located on these sites to rebuild their livelihoods.

== Archeological sites ==
Dead cities and archeological sites in Limestone Massif include Church of Saint Simeon Stylites, Serjilla, Bara, Basufan, Barisha, Qalb Loze, Barad, Cyrrhus, Turmanin, Banabil, Kafr Aruq, Kafr Dariyan, Babuline, Hazarin, Jarada, Maghara, Shinan, Farkya, Ein Laruz, Ebla, Deir Sunbul, Al-Dana, Sarmada and Al-Dana.

=== Mount Simeon, Mount Kurd and Mount Ḥalqa ===
Name	Image	Coordinates	Governorate	Notes
Barad (Arabic: براد)		36°23′8″N 36°53′57″E	Aleppo	An ancient settlement, located 32 km (20 mi) west of Aleppo, has many old basilicas; for example, the Saint Julianus Maronite monastery (399-402 AD) where the shrine of Saint Maron is located, and a basilica at the northern part of the village built in 561.
Barjaka or Burj Suleiman village (Arabic: برجكة)		36°19′25.80″N 36°53′35.71″E	Aleppo	Located 26 km (16 mi) northwest of Aleppo. The site has remnants of an old hermit tower and a well-preserved chapel from the 6th century.
Basufan (Arabic: باصوفان)		36°20′26.69″N 36°52′33.11″E	Aleppo	
Batuta (Arabic: بطوطة)		36°18′21″N 36°53′14″E	Aleppo	Village founded in the 4th century CE. By the 6th century, it had two churches and more than twelve other stone buildings.
Baziher (Arabic: بازيهر)		36°19′7″N 36°52′29″E	Aleppo	
Benastur Monastery (Arabic: بنستور)		36°18′12.00″N 36°55′23.00″E	Aleppo	
Churches of Sheikh Suleiman village (Arabic: كنائس شيخ سليمان)		36°16′24.00″N 36°54′36.00″E	Aleppo	Located 28 km (17 mi) west of Aleppo, is notable for its three ancient churches: a ruined church located at the centre of the village, a well-preserved southern basilica which was built in 602, and the Church of the Virgin Mary which belongs to the late fifth century and is considered one of the most beautiful churches in northern Syria. There is a hermit tower in the northern side of the village.
Church of Saint Simeon Stylites (Deir Semaan) (Arabic: دير سمعان)		36°19′35.00″N 36°50′01.00″E	Aleppo	One of the most celebrated ecclesiastical monuments in Syria and among the oldest standing Christian churches in the world. It is located about 35 km (22 mi) northwest of Aleppo.
Cyrrhus (Arabic: سيروس – نبي هوري)		36°44′39″N 36°57′33″E	Aleppo	An ancient city located 65 km (40 mi) north of Aleppo, is the site of Saints Cosmas and Damian Church (commonly known as Nabi Houri church), as well as a Roman amphitheatre and two old Roman bridges.
Deir Amman churches (Arabic: دير عمان)		36°12′8″N 36°49′18″E	Aleppo	
Deir Mishmish Church (Arabic: كنيسة دير مشمش)		36°27′47″N 36°55′1″E	Aleppo	
Deir Turmanin (Arabic: دير ترمانين)		36°14′30″N 36°49′24″E	Idlib	The ruins of the Byzantine monastery of Deir Turmanin are built around a paved courtyard containing two cisterns, a sarcophagus and several tombs. They include a building that housed the monks' dormitories, and the large basilica built around 480 AD.
Fafertin Church (Arabic: كنيسة فافرتين)		36°19′13.79″N 36°54′26.41″E	Aleppo	A half-ruined Late Roman basilica dates to 372 AD; it is located 22 km (14 mi) northwest of Aleppo. According to the Aleppine historian Abdallah Hajjar, Fafertin Basilica is among the oldest dated churches in the world.
Kafr Kira settlement in Burj Heidar village (Arabic: كفر كيرا في برج حيدر)	West Church, Burj Haidar (برج حيدر), Syria - Nave colonnades, view from southwest	36°20′36.05″N 36°54′09.08″E	Aleppo	Located 24 km (15 mi) northwest of Aleppo, has many half-ruined Christian structures dating back to the fourth and sixth centuries.
Kafr Lab (Arabic: كفر لاب)		36°20′08.09″N 36°53′26.79″E	Aleppo	
Kafr Lusein (Arabic: كفر لوسين)		36°15′19.88″N 36°42′42.03″E	Aleppo	
Kafr Nabu (Arabic: كفر نابو)		36°21′36.54″N 36°54′28.88″E	Aleppo	Located 29 km (18 mi) west of Aleppo, is an Assyrian settlement of the ninth century BC and the site of a Roman temple which was converted into a church. There are also well-preserved residential buildings from the fifth and sixth centuries.
Kalota Castle and churches (Arabic: كالوطة)	East Church, Kalota, Syria - Nave looking east	36°21′18.22″N 36°56′33.51″E	Aleppo	Located 20 km northwest of Aleppo. The castle was originally built as a Roman temple during the 2nd century AD. After converting to Christianity, the temple was turned into a basilica within the 5th century. As a result of the wars between the Hamadanids and the Byzantine Empire, the church was turned into a castle during the 10th century. There are two well-preserved churches near the castle: the eastern church built in 492 and the western church of the 6th century.
Kharab Shams Basilica (Arabic: خرب شمس)		36°20′22.0″N 36°56′34.0″E	Aleppo	One of the oldest best-preserved Christian structures in the Levant dates to the fourth century CE. The Byzantine church is located 21 km (13 mi) northwest of Aleppo.
Kimar, near Basuta village (Arabic: كيمار)	East Church, Kimar, Syria - View of apse from west	36°25′25.3″N 36°53′45.4″E	Aleppo	Located 35 km (22 mi) northwest of Aleppo, is a fifth-century CE village of the Late Roman and Byzantine eras; it has many well-preserved churches, towers and old water cisterns.
Mushabbak Basilica (Arabic: المشبك)		36°15′17.00″N 36°53′01.00″E	Aleppo	A well-preserved church from the second half of the fifth century (around 470), is located 25 km (16 mi) west of Aleppo, near the town of Daret A'zzeh.
Qatura (Arabic: قاطورة)		36°18′02.71″N 36°49′48.34″E	Aleppo	
Refade (Arabic: رفادة)		36°18′57″N 36°49′19″E	Idlib	
Sargible (Arabic: سرجبلا)		36°14′17″N 36°42′59″E	Idlib	
Set al-Roum (Arabic: ست الروم)		36°18′37″N 36°50′3″E	Aleppo	
Sheikh Barakat (Arabic: الشيخ بركات)		36°16′40″N 36°49′18″E	Aleppo	
Sinkhar historic settlement (Arabic: سنخار)		36°17′52.00″N 36°54′30.00″E	Aleppo	Locally known as Simkhar, is located 24 km (15 mi) northwest of Aleppo in an isolated valley. The village was inhabited between the second and seventh centuries. Its Basilica is among the oldest churches in Syria and dates back to the fourth century, while the nearby chapel is sixth century.
Sugane village (Arabic: صوغانة)		36°26′11.5″N 36°55′40.0″E	Aleppo	Located 40 km (25 mi) northwest of Aleppo, is home to two half-ruined churches and old water cisterns.
Surqaniya village (Arabic: سرقانيا)	6th c. CE Church, Surqaniya (سرقانيا), Syria - South and west façades	36°18′59.00″N 36°54′02.00″E	Aleppo	Located 23 km (14 mi) northwest of Aleppo, preserves the remains of an old Byzantine settlement with a half-ruined sixth-century chapel.
Taladah Church and Monastery (Arabic: تل عادة)		36°15′5″N 36°48′4″E	Idlib	
Taqla (Arabic: تقلا)		36°19′09.96″N 36°50′51.03″E	Aleppo	
Zarzita (Arabic: زرزيتا)	Tower and porch, Zarzita (زرزيتا), Syria - View from southwest	36°17′34.24″N 36°48′03.48″E	Aleppo	

=== Harim Mountains (Mount Bārīshā and Mount A'lā) ===
Name	Image	Coordinates	Governorate	Notes
al-Breij (Arabic: البريج)		36°11′58.26″N 36°40′52.24″E	Idlib	
al-Kfeir (Arabic: الكفير)		36°11′13.52″N 36°34′03.64″E	Idlib	Located in the mountainous region of Mount Aʻlā, less than two kilometers from Qalb Loze
Bab Al-Hawa (Arabic: باب الهوا)		36°12′19.42″N 36°43′31.37″E	Idlib	Located 50 km (31 mi) west of Aleppo on the Turkish border, is the site of several fourth century churches and a well-preserved historical gate from the sixth century AD.
Babisqa (Arabic: بابسقا)		36°12′53.17″N 36°41′23.17″E	Idlib	
Bamuqa (Arabic: باموقا)		36°12′02.23″N 36°38′18.40″E	Idlib	
Banabil (Arabic: بنابل)		36°12′01.99″N 36°33′41.31″E	Idlib	
Banqusa (Arabic: بانقوسا)		36°5′54″N 36°37′36″E	Idlib	
Baqirha (Arabic: باقرحا)		36°12′22.91″N 36°39′35.87″E	Idlib	
Barisha (Arabic: باريشا)		36°09′58″N 36°38′10″E	Idlib	
Barish al-Shamali (Arabic: باريش الشمالي)		36°11′00.37″N 36°34′50.53″E	Idlib	
Bashkuh (Arabic: باشكوح)		36°11′39.76″N 36°37′54.20″E	Idlib	
Bashmishli (Arabic: باشمشلي)		36°11′44″N 36°35′37″E	Idlib	
Bauda (Arabic: بعودا)		36°12′54.63″N 36°41′51.14″E	Idlib	Located just a few kilometers from the Turkish border on the far northeastern edge of Jebel Barisha.
Behyo (Arabic: بحيو)		36°09′09.10″N 36°34′45.24″E	Idlib	Village in northwestern Syria, built in the 5th and 6th centuries. Archaeological remains include two churches, olive presses, villas and other dwellings.
Beitar (Arabic: بيتر)		36°11′35.73″N 36°34′50.01″E	Idlib	
Beshandlaya (Arabic: بشندلايا)		36°08′37.80″N 36°33′24.21″E	Idlib	
Binsira (Arabic: بنصرة)		36°1′1″N 36°25′13″E	Idlib	
Burj Aizarara (Arabic: برج عيزارارا)		36°08′48.18″N 36°40′33.54″E	Idlib	
Dahis (Arabic: داحس)		36°10′49.06″N 36°37′48.84″E	Idlib	
Dana (Arabic: الدانا)		36°12′47″N 36°46′14″E	Idlib	Located north of Idlib, 38 kilometers west of Aleppo, and just east of the border with Turkey.
Deirouni (Arabic: ديروني)	Monastery, Deirouni (ديروني), Syria - West and south façades of chapel	36°12′40.19″N 36°39′36.82″E	Idlib	
Deir Qeita (Arabic: دير قيتا)		36°12′54.43″N 36°39′57.35″E	Idlib	
Deir Seita (Arabic: دير سيتا)		36°06′01.23″N 36°38′40.67″E	Idlib	
Fasuq (Arabic: الفاسوق)		36°1′6″N 36°27′5″E	Idlib	
Kafr Aqab (Arabic: كفر عقاب)		36°1′54″N 36°26′47″E	Idlib	
Kafr Aruq (Arabic: كفر عروق)		36°7′14″N 36°39′21″E	Idlib	
Kafr Dariyan (Arabic: كفر دريان)		36°10′18.00″N 36°40′11.00″E	Idlib	
Khirbet al-Khatib (Arabic: خربة الخطيب)		36°12′49″N 36°38′17″E	Idlib	
Kseibjeh (Arabic: كسيبجة)		36°12′30″N 36°42′20″E	Idlib	
Kukaniyeh (Arabic: كوكانية)		36°06′53.12″N 36°36′24.74″E	Idlib	
Ma'suratah (Arabic: معصراتة)		36°9′46″N 36°33′4″E	Idlib	
Maaz (Arabic: ماعز)		36°08′44.69″N 36°40′01.46″E	Idlib	
Qalb Loze (Arabic: قلب لوزة)		36°10′9″N 36°34′50″E	Idlib	
Qarqbizeh (Arabic: قرقبيزة)		36°10′30.29″N 36°35′07.93″E	Idlib	
Sarfud (Arabic: صرفود)		36°11′11.70″N 36°41′17.99″E	Idlib	
Sarmada (Arabic: سرمدا)		36°10′57.48″N 36°43′52.38″E	Idlib	

=== Mount Zāwiya ===
Name	Image	Coordinates	Governorate	Notes
al-Dana (Arabic: الدانا)		35°42′12.84″N 36°41′15.75″E	Idlib	A modern village on far eastern edge of Jebel al-Zawiyeh and Jebel Riha.
Babuline (Arabic: بابولين)		35°32′16″N 36°40′43″E	Idlib	
Bara (Arabic: بارة)		35°41′17.42″N 36°31′51.34″E	Idlib	
Bashila (Arabic: بشيلا)		35°39′19.68″N 36°31′34.92″E	Idlib	
Batrasa (Arabic: بترسا)		35°39′56.15″N 36°32′38.82″E	Idlib	
Bauda (Arabic: بعودا)		35°40′13.78″N 36°34′08.50″E	Idlib	Located on the side of the road between the two major sites of Bara and Serjilla.
Deir Sunbul (Arabic: دير سنبل)		35°41′52.21″N 36°36′14.35″E	Idlib	
Dellozeh (Arabic: دللوزة)		35°41′45.52″N 36°34′57.04″E	Idlib	
Ebla (Arabic: ابلا)		35°47′52.8″N 36°47′52.8″E	Idlib	One of the earliest kingdoms in Syria. Its remains constitute a tell located about 55 km (34 mi) southwest of Aleppo near the village of Mardikh.
Ein Laruz (Arabic: عين لاروز)		35°41′1″N 36°26′24″E	Idlib	
Farkya (Arabic: فركيا)		35°43′26.84″N 36°36′02.49″E	Idlib	
Hazarin (Arabic: حزارين)		35°35′56″N 36°31′39″E	Idlib	
Jarada (Arabic: جرادة)		35°43′26.43″N 36°42′56.05″E	Idlib	
Maghara (Arabic: مغارة)		35°44′03.43″N 36°35′12.27″E	Idlib	
Majliya (Arabic: مجليا)		35°40′17.26″N 36°32′28.87″E	Idlib	
Mozra (Arabic: الموزرة)		35°39′23″N 36°26′22″E	Idlib	
Qasr al-Banat (Arabic: قصر البنات)		35°42′33.97″N 36°41′06.35″E	Idlib	
Rabiaa (Arabic: ربيعة)		35°39′19.62″N 36°34′48.88″E	Idlib	
Ruweiha (Arabic: رويحة)		35°44′16.88″N 36°41′41.57″E	Idlib	
Serjilla (Arabic: سرجيلا)		35°40′17.55″N 36°35′05.51″E	Idlib	
Shinan (Arabic: شنان)		35°44′7″N 36°36′42″E	Idlib	
Shinshirah (Arabic: شنشراح)		35°38′24.88″N 36°34′08.41″E	Idlib	
Wadi Martahun (Arabic: وادي مرتحون)		35°40′30.13″N 36°30′55.15″E	Idlib	

== See also ==
- World Heritage Sites in Danger
