= Al-Dana =

Al-Dana may refer to:

- Al-Dana, Syria
- Al-Dana, Maarrat al-Nu'man
- Al-Dana (vessel)
- Al-Dana Island, UAE
