= Batuta, Syria =

Dead City in Syria

Coordinates: 36°18′21″N 36°53′14″E

Batuta (باطوطة), is a village in northwestern Syria, located in the Jebel Sem’an region of the Dead Cities. The village was founded in the 4th century CE. By the 6th century, it had two churches and more than twelve other stone buildings. Batuta’s hilltop location, surrounded by other villages on the valley and hillsides, enabled it to serve as a center of roads across the Jebel Sem’an for the oil trade. In 2011, the village was named a UNESCO World Heritage Site as part of the Dead Cities.

== Location ==
Batuta is located west of Fafertin (فافرتين) and Surqaniya (سرقانيا), two other villages in the Dead Cities. The ruins are spread out over a large area on high ground in the Jebel Sem’an region.

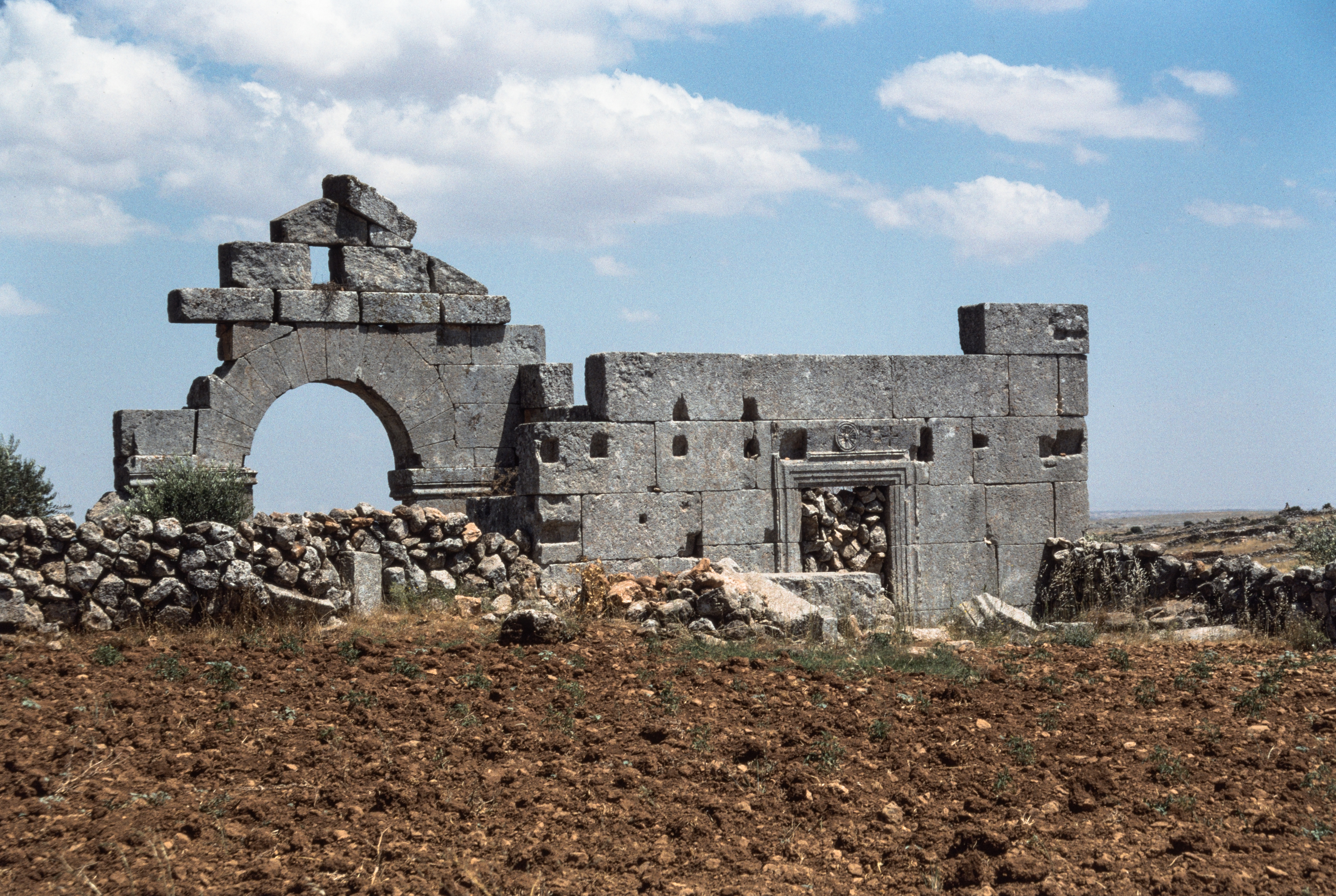
Church, Batuta - West facade and triumphal arch, from the northwest

== Archaeological Remains ==
Two churches and several other stone structures remain in Batuta, today. Some structures bear dated inscriptions.

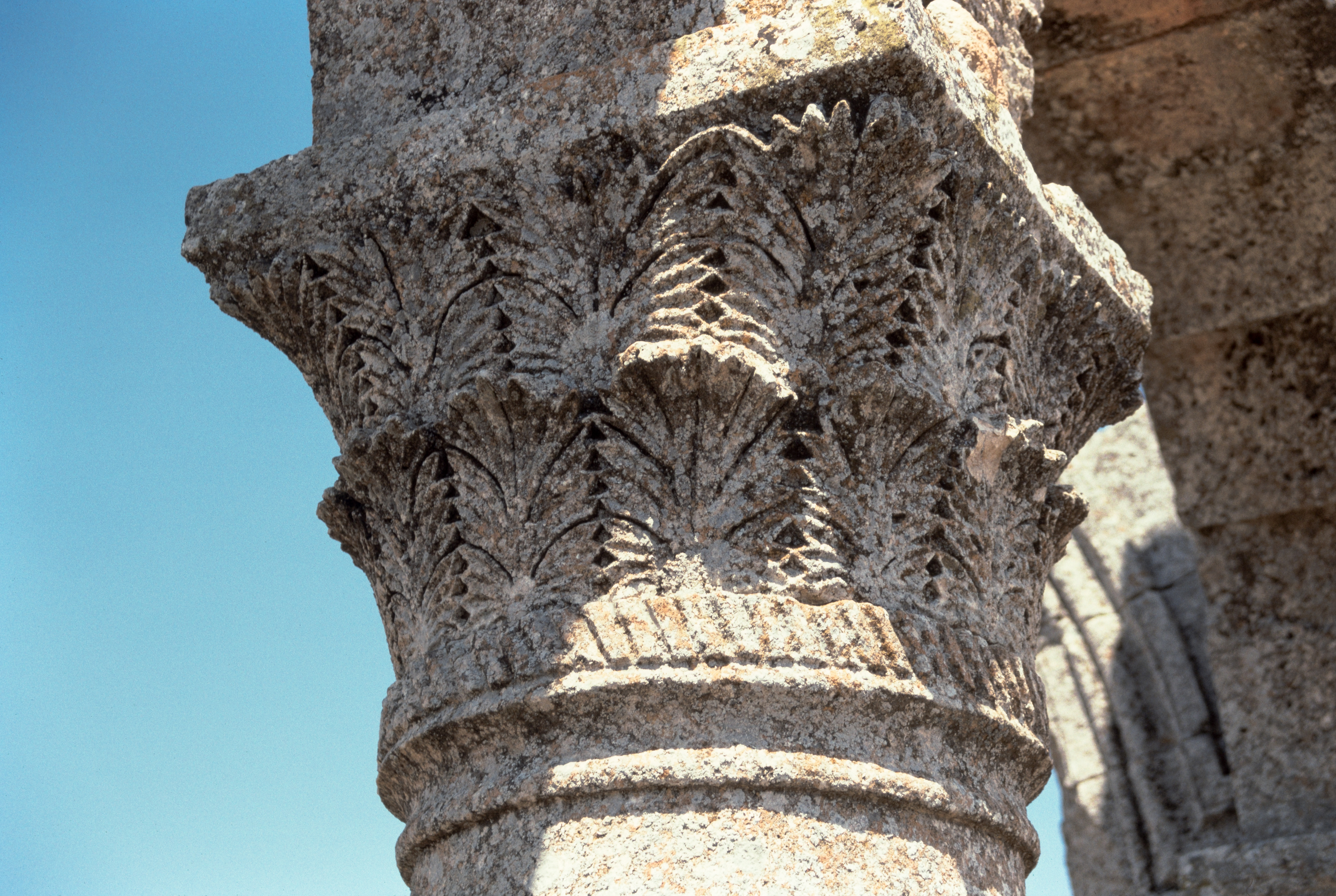
Church, Batuta - Detail of capital, south arcade, looking southeast towards triumphal arch

In the center of town is the main church, a colonnaded basilica with a semicircular apse built in the 4th century. There are two main entrances on the south side, rectangular windows and protruding stone blocks for building support, typical characteristics of 4th century Christian architecture. The nave has 5 bays and aisles on each side, with only the south arcade preserved. The column capitals along the nave each have distinct styles. These include: a Corinthian capital without volutes, a capital of the Syrian Ionic order, a Doric-Tuscan capital, and a four-faced Ionic capital. There is a portico of piers on the church’s west end, and the east wall has graffiti by passing pilgrims. The church was rebuilt in the 5th century with a bema, which now sits in the center of the nave.

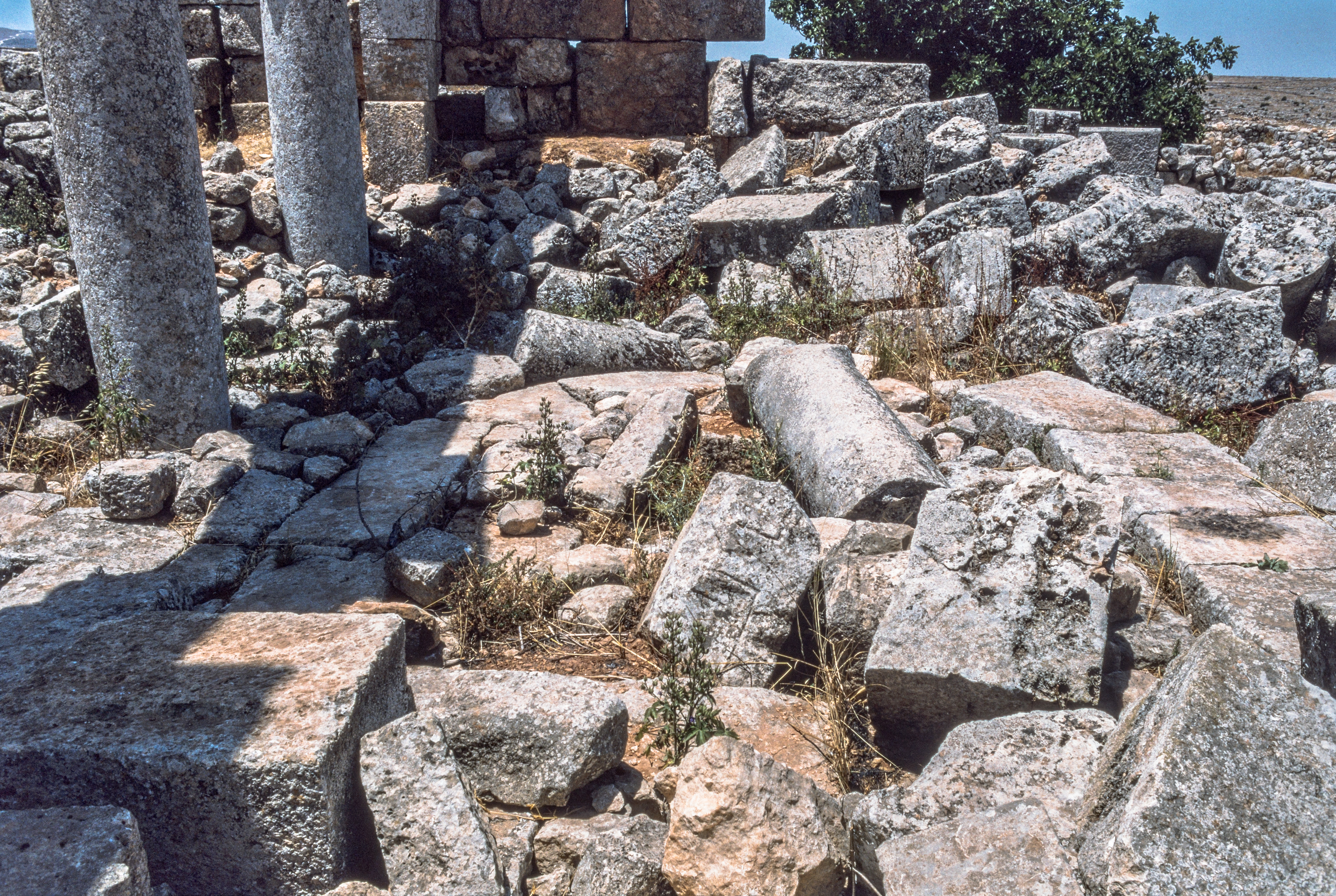
Church, Batuta (باطوطة), Syria - Bema, looking west

40m south of the central church is a two-story building that likely served as a dwelling. The ground floor retains a decorated votive baluster

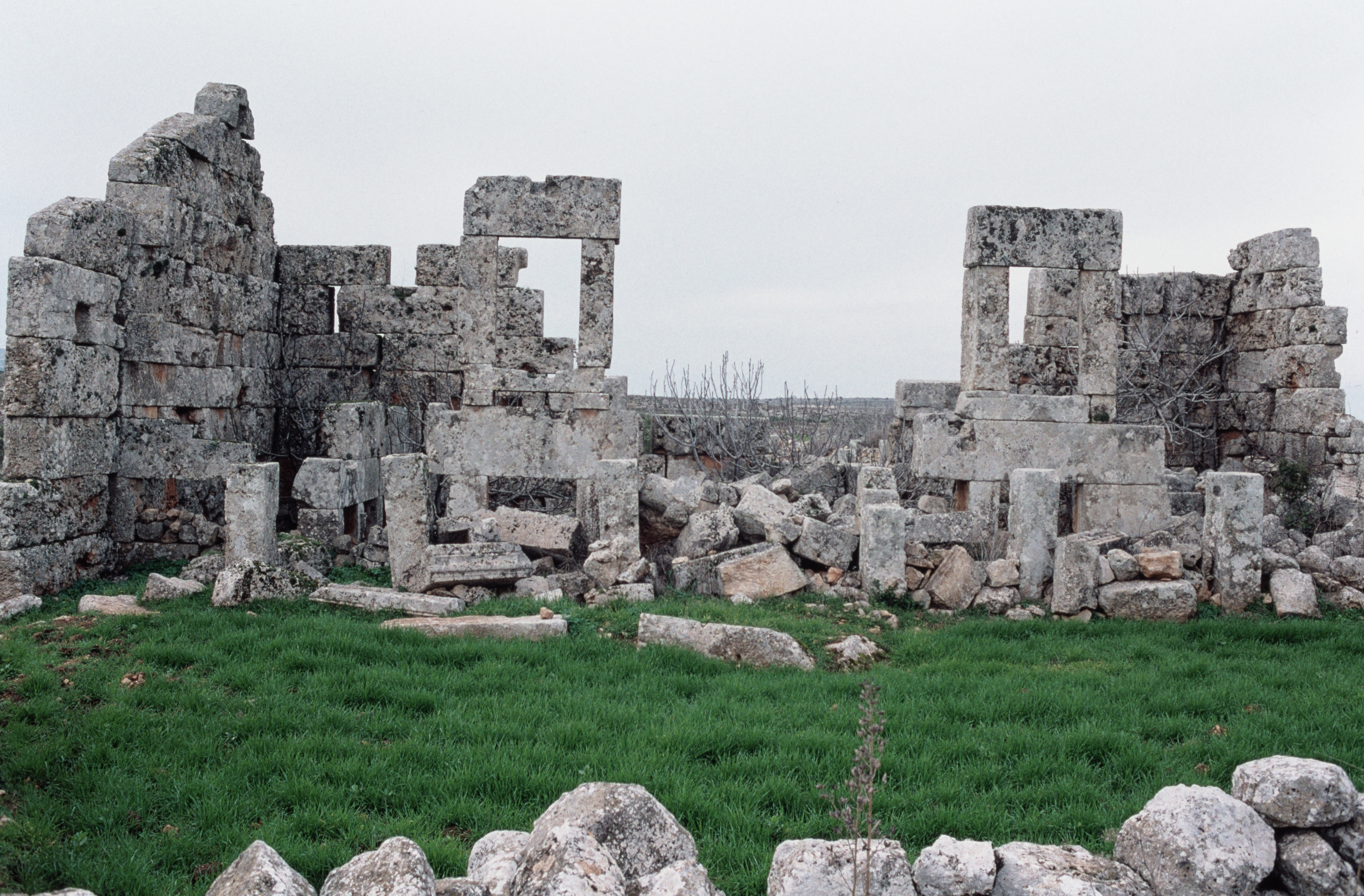
Batuta - Dwelling (?), View from the east

100m southeast from the central church is another, smaller church, closer to the edge of town. This structure consists of a nave and square apse. The south and west entrances were originally protected by columned porch, which have recently collapsed. Though fragments of the south porch entablature currently lie on the ground, a medallion and part of the foliage ornament are visible.

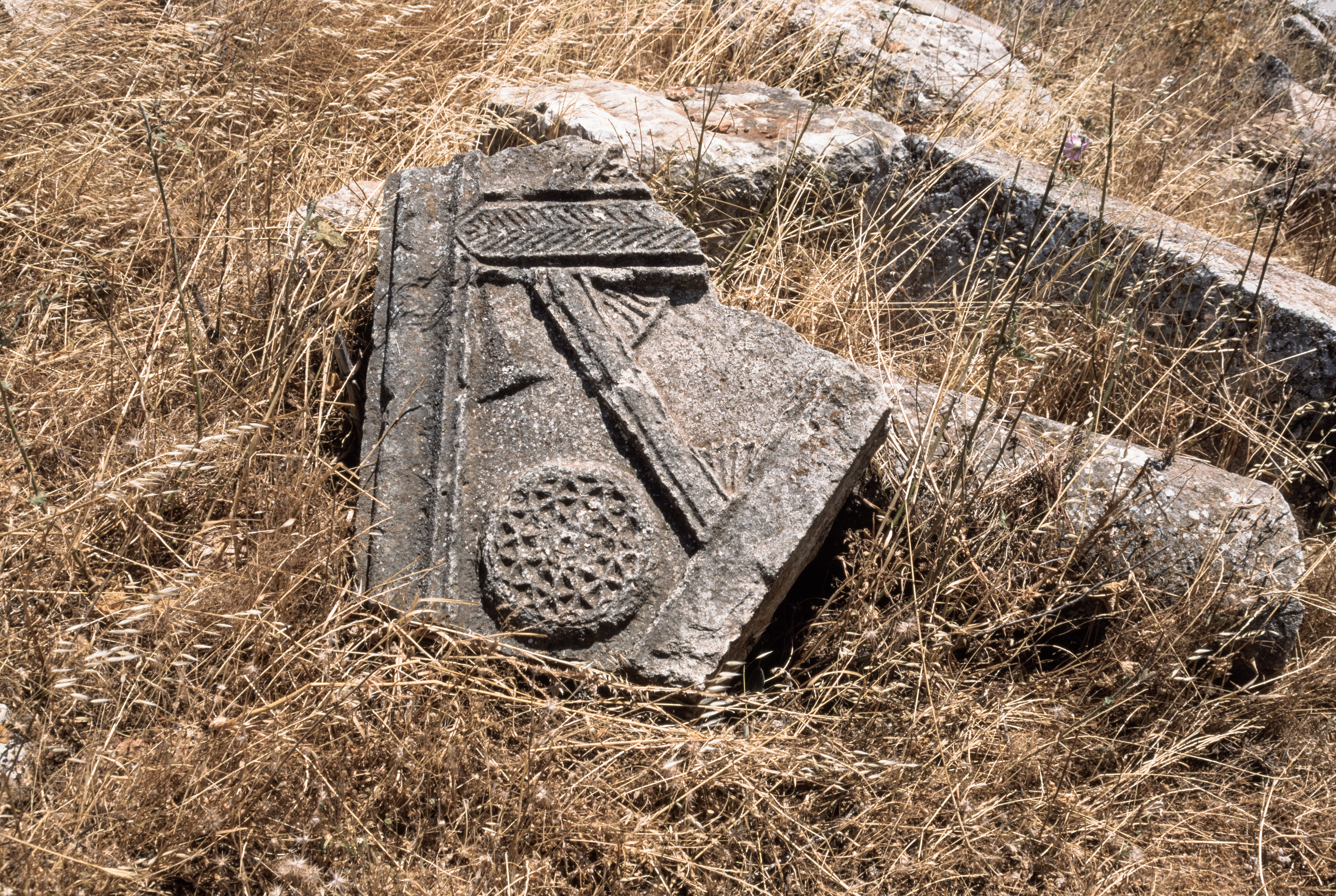
Church, Batuta - Fragment of entablature from south porch
