= Zarzita =

Village in Syria

Coordinates: 36°17′35″N 36°48′01″E

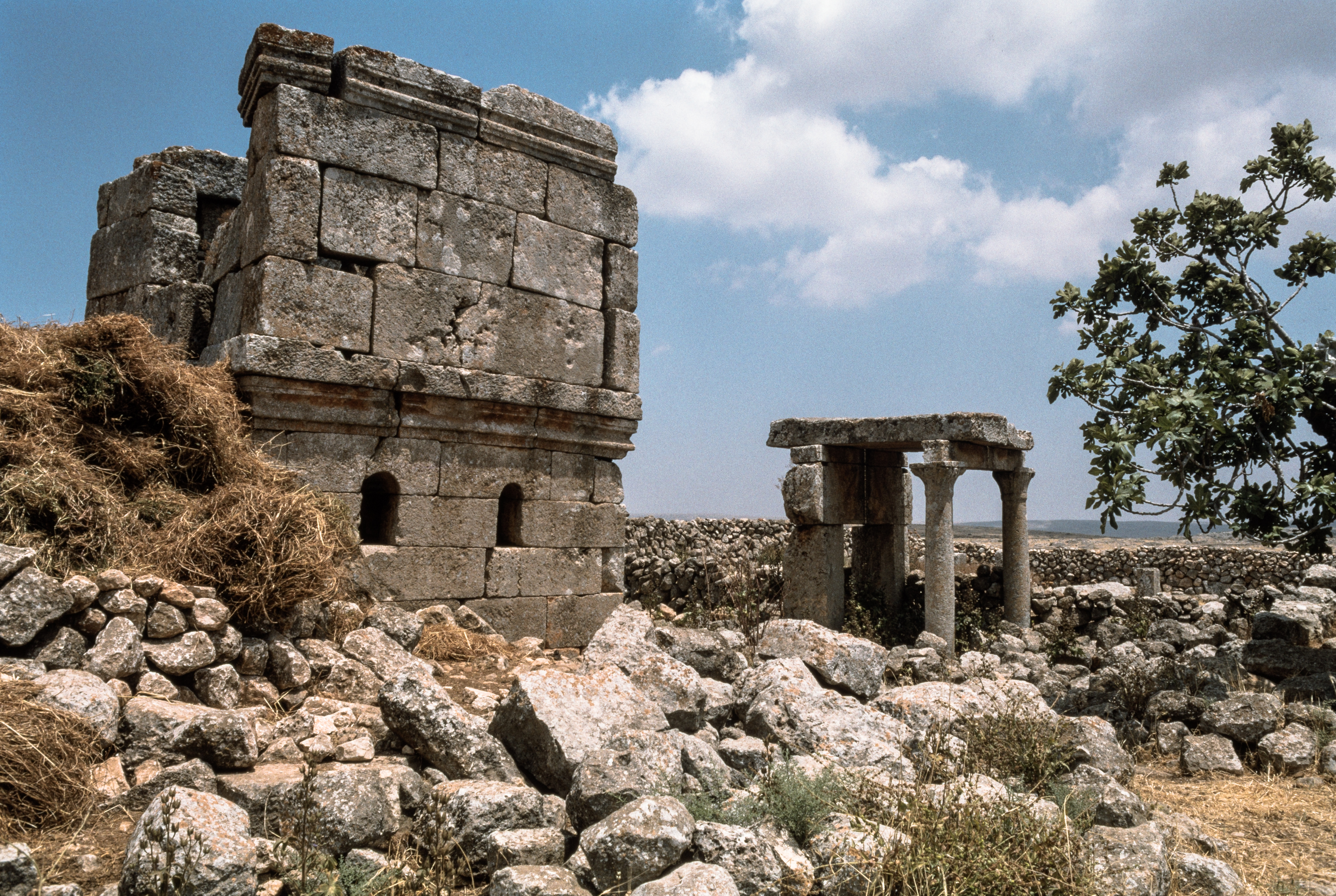
Tower and porch, view from southwest

Zarzita (زرزيتا) is a village in northwestern Syria, located in the Jebel Jalaqa region of the Dead Cities. It was constructed in the 5th-6th century CE, a time when local agricultural prosperity supported many surrounding monastic communities.

== Location ==
The ruins of Zarzita stand on the western slopes of Jebel Sheikh Barakat, with views of the plain of Amuq, east of Antioch. The village is located on an ancient muleteer road linking Aleppo to Antioch via Toqad and Tormanin. Saint Simeon the Grand likely passed through Zarzita when he was forced to abandon the Eusebonas monastery.

== Demographics ==
Although the inhabitants of Zarzita tend to be Turkish nomads, the village's original population numbered about 200 because of limited agricultural opportunities in the town itself.

== Archaeological remains ==
Seven inscriptions have been found in Zarzita, six of which note the structure's proprietor and the architect. Of the buildings that remain, archaeologists note a church, tower, and some houses. The single-nave church dates to the sixth century and has higher, narrower proportions compared to others in the region. The nave looks southwest and retains a rectangular sanctuary. There is one west entrance and two on either side wall (north and south). It has a square presbyterium and oblong side chambers. The columns and arches are lost.

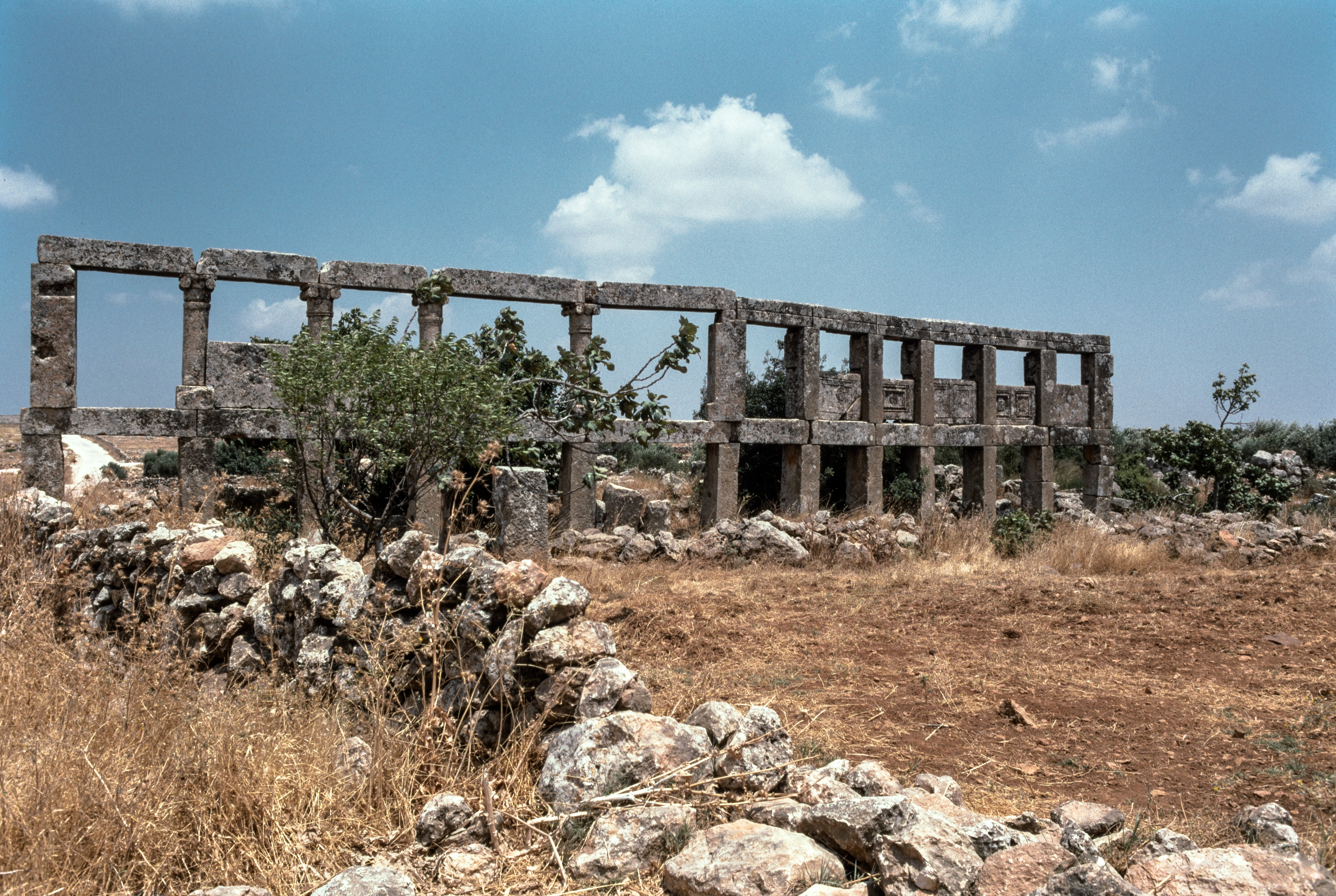
Portico, view from southwest

The tower stands 30 meters southeast of the church, at the end of a long stoa. The two-story military structure is 4m^{2}, and has a molded stringcourse with an inscribed date of 500 CE. This tower was likely commissioned by a priest Simeon, and built by the architects Eusebius and Jean. An ecclesiastical recluse may have lived in this tower, as the bottom floor could have functioned as a chapel, with the upper floor for living quarters. There are two doors and a small arched window. The north door has a deteriorated roundel carving with recluse symbolism.

Most dwelling ruins in Zarzita have a simple rectangular style without cornices or other moldings. One ruin remains in only a two-story portico, while others just have inscriptions. Two on the south side of town have inscriptions that read:

God In the year 587, the 7th of the month Gorpieos. (This upper) story was built by Iakobos Rochios and Thomas, through the efforts and kindness of Nonnos, deacon, and Philipos, and Abramios (his) son. (September 548, AD)”.

“O Christ help Ioannes son of Nonnos : he built (this) in the year 587, month Desios. (June, 539 AD)...or “O Christ help Ioannes son of Nonnos : (this is the house) of Ioannes son of Nonnos.”
