= Ksegbe =

Coordinates: 36°12′30″N 36°42′20″E

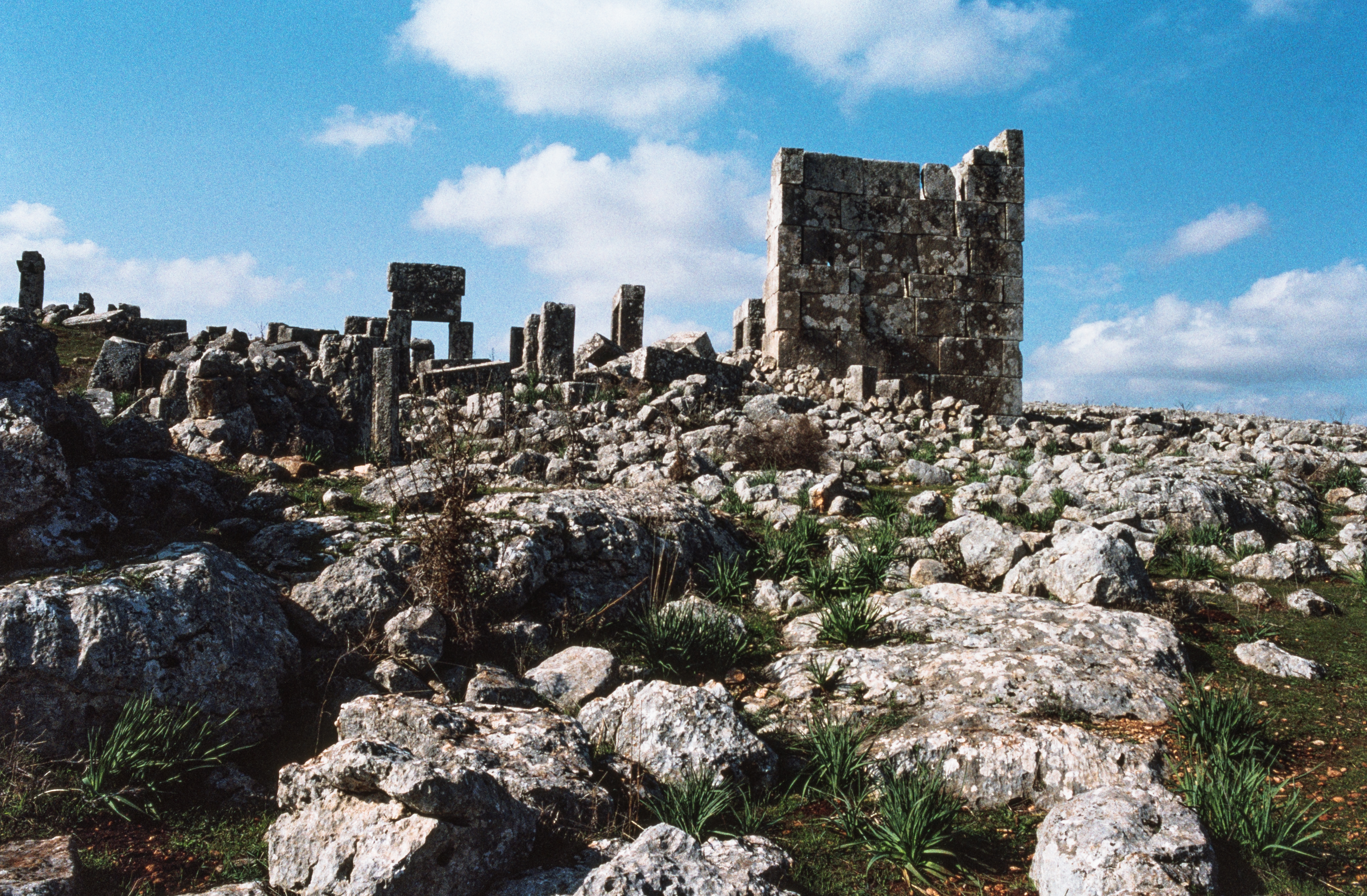
Ksegbe, - Unidentified structure

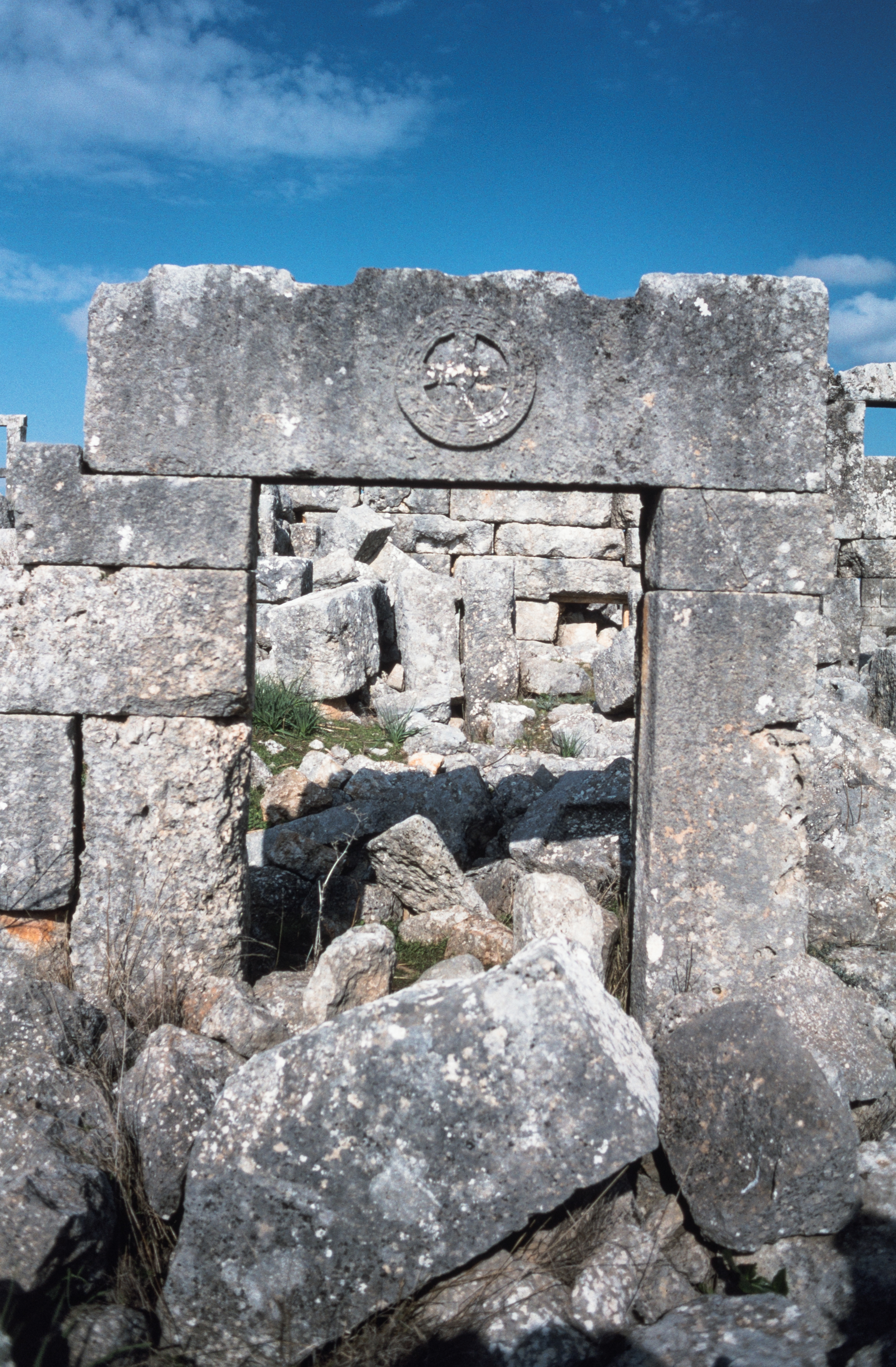
Ksegbe, - Unidentified structure

Ksejbe, also Kseibjeh, (Arabic: كسيبجة) is a village in northwestern Syria, located in the Jebel Barisha region of the Dead Cities. Surviving remains include two churches, olive presses, and likely dwellings, all probably constructed in the 5th and 6th centuries CE. In 2011, the village was named a UNESCO World Heritage Site as part of the Dead Cities.

== Location ==
Ksejbe sits on a hilltop at the northeastern edge of the Jebel Barisha. The hilltop used to be flat, but archeological ruin has left the ground uneven. Ksejbe is visible from the large Plain of Sermeda. To the north of Ksejbe lies the village of Sergible (سرجبلا), in Jebel Halaqa, and to the east stands the dome of Jebel Sheikh Berekat. Ksegbe lies near the large road between Antioch and Qinnasrin, near present-day Aleppo.

== Archaeological remains ==
What remains in Ksejbe include a large and small church, on the east and west edges of town, respectively, as well as olive presses and unidentified buildings.

The large church is located at the top of the village's eastern slope. The church's south façade still stands, including its two ornate entrances, but the north, east, and west ends have fallen. It was constructed in 414 CE, as inscribed on the lintel above the church's southeastern entrance. The inscription also includes the name of the architect, Markianos Kyrillas, and is surrounding by moldings designed with elaborate geometric and foliage motifs. The church has a standard basilica plan consisting of a nave with a five-column-long arcade on either side separating the two side aisles. The interior columns and arches have all fallen and now lie in the nave. Each capital of the arcade is unique and is paired with a matching capital across the nave in the other arcade. The capital designs vary from Corinthian to inverted fillets with discs, vertical grooves, or beaded basket-work. Between the southeastern column and its neighboring pillar are two reliquaries, one single and one double. On the eastern side of the south aisle, there is a baptistery, post-dating the church's original construction), and a funerary chamber containing a tomb.

An atrium frames the south side of the church. On the east side of the atrium is a two-story baptistery, and a small chamber with an entrance. The south side of the atrium has an open stoa of plain piers, which leads southward to a doorway. The west side of the atrium only has one entrance, whose doorway does not remain.

The small church lies atop the western slope, southwest of the main group of village buildings. It was constructed in the 6th century. The church is square in plan, with entrances on the south and west sides. Today, the south, west, and part of the eastern façade remain. The church's east end is rectangular and is flanked by square chambers. The nave has four narrow arches on each side, its columns topped with Corinthian capitals.
