= Babisqa =

Coordinates: 36°11′57″N 36°41′34″E

Babisqa (بابسقا) is a village in the Dead Cities of northwestern Syria. Its archaeological remains include two churches, large and small public baths, and a marketplace as well as unidentified buildings, which were constructed between the 4th and 7th centuries CE. In 2011, the village was named a UNESCO World Heritage Site as part of the Dead Cities.

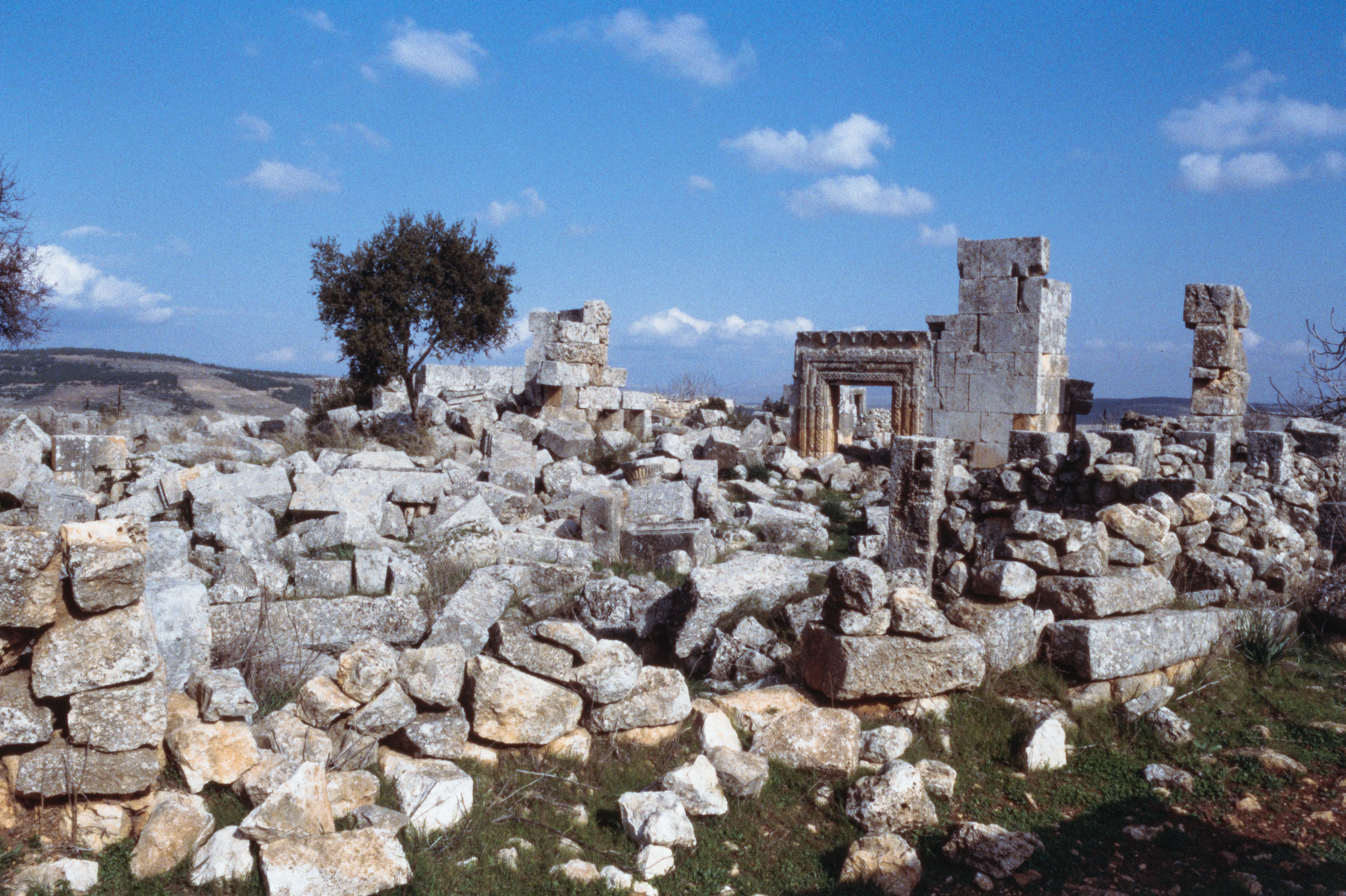
Markianos Church (East Church), Babisqa - General view, looking northeast

== Location ==
Babisqa is located in the Jebel Barisha region of the Dead Cities, within the Idlib Governorate.

== Archaeological remains ==
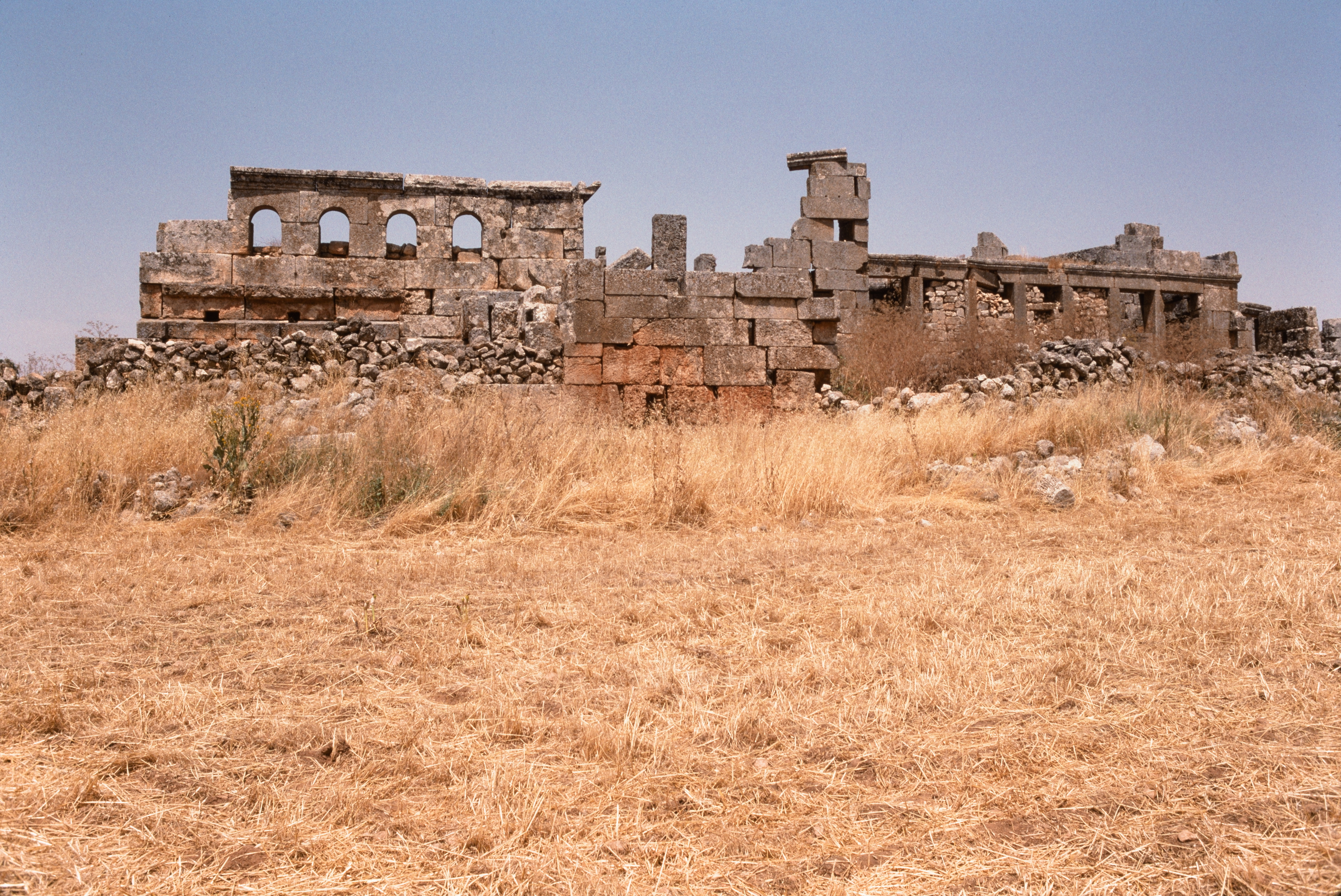
Baths, Babisqa - View from the south

There are two churches, public baths, and a marketplace that remain today in Babisqa.

The baths at Babisqa are the only certain baths found in the Jebel Barisha region. They survive in large and small sections. Piers and arcades indicate historical two- and three-story structures at this location. Additionally, there remain tunnel vaults, which are typically found only in baths and tombs in Northern Syria and therefore help identify this structure as a bath center.

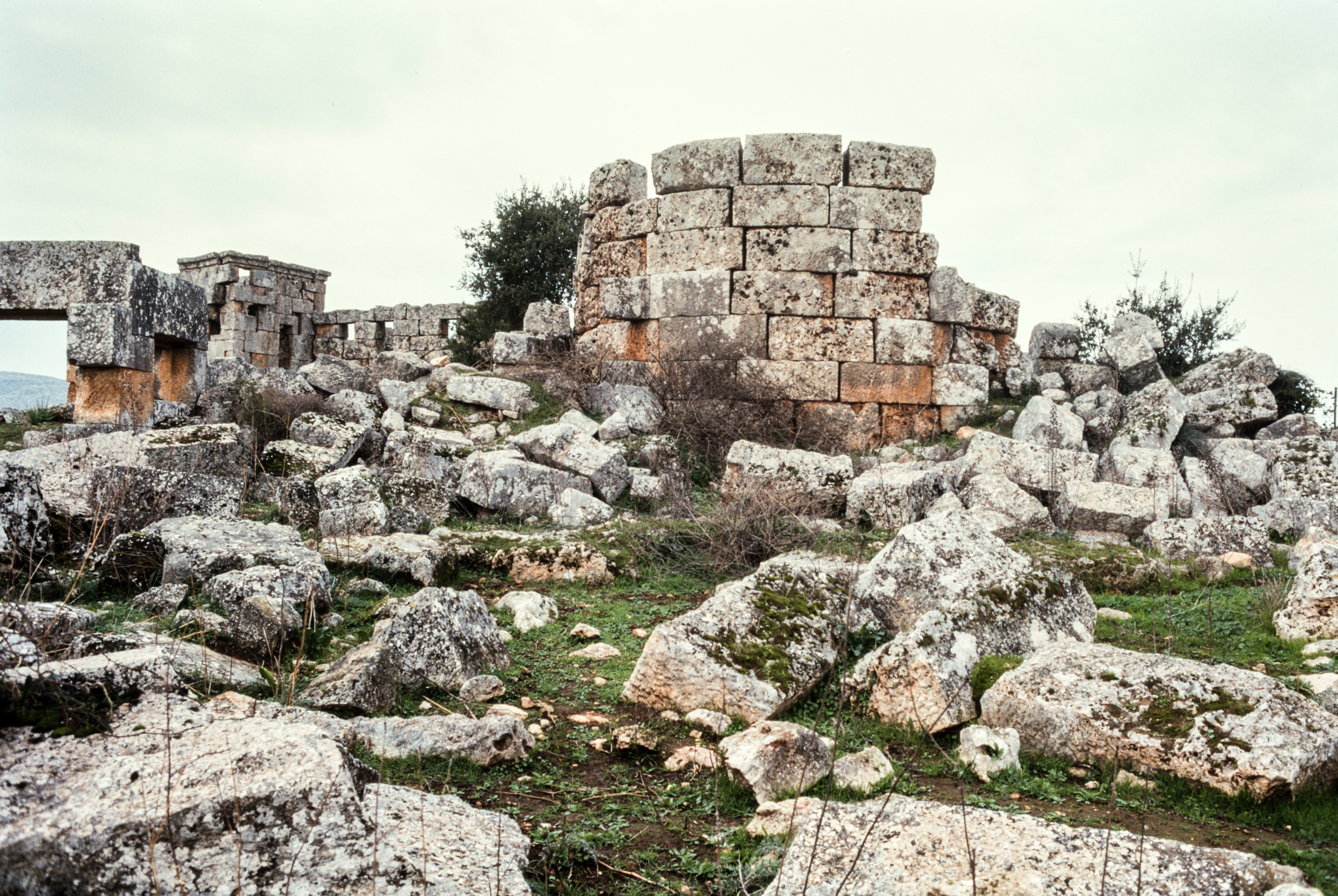
Markianos Church (East Church), Babisqa - General view, looking west

The marketplace dates to 547 CE, as noted in an inscription on a parapet panel standing between piers of the upper story of the main building. The main building is 33 meters long with 5 chambers and two-story portico with 14 piers.

There are two basilicas in Babisqa: one was constructed between 390 CE and 480 CE, and the other dates to 609-610 CE. The early church, often referred to as the “Markianos Church,” is larger and located on the east side of the village, opposite the smaller, west church, St. Sergius.

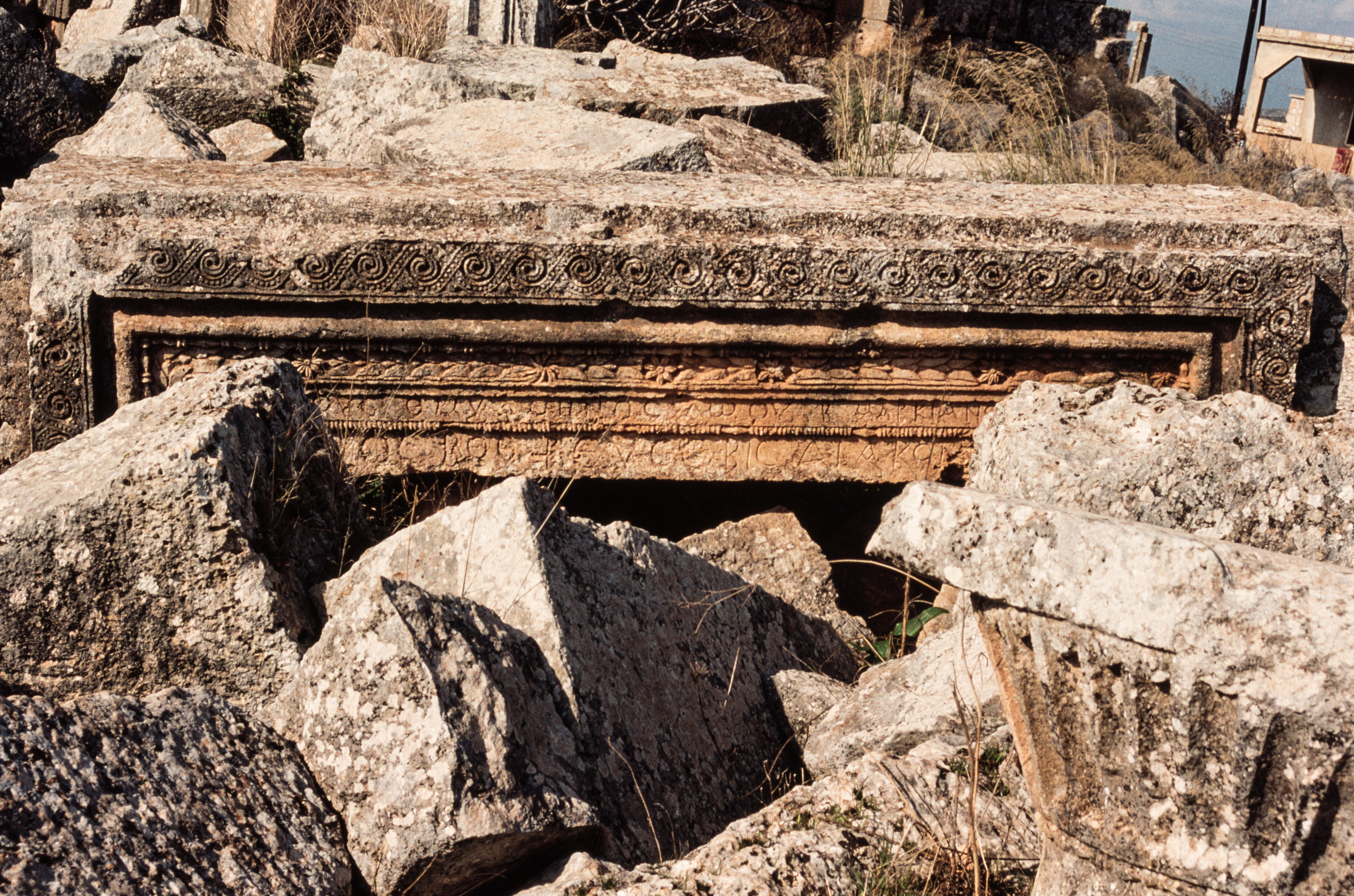
Markianos Church (East Church), Babisqa - Inscribed lintel in atrium, likely belonged to southeast entrance of church

Inscriptions indicate the construction timeline of the "Markianos Church.” A lintel that presumably belonged to the atrium's southeastern entrance per Butler's reconstruction bears the date 390 CE and refers to Markianios Kyris, presbyter. Another lintel inscription, presumably from the southern entrance to the church, bears the date 401 CE and mentions Markianos as the architect. An inscription on a doorway at the entrance to the atrium refers to Moses presbyter completing the façade in 480 CE.

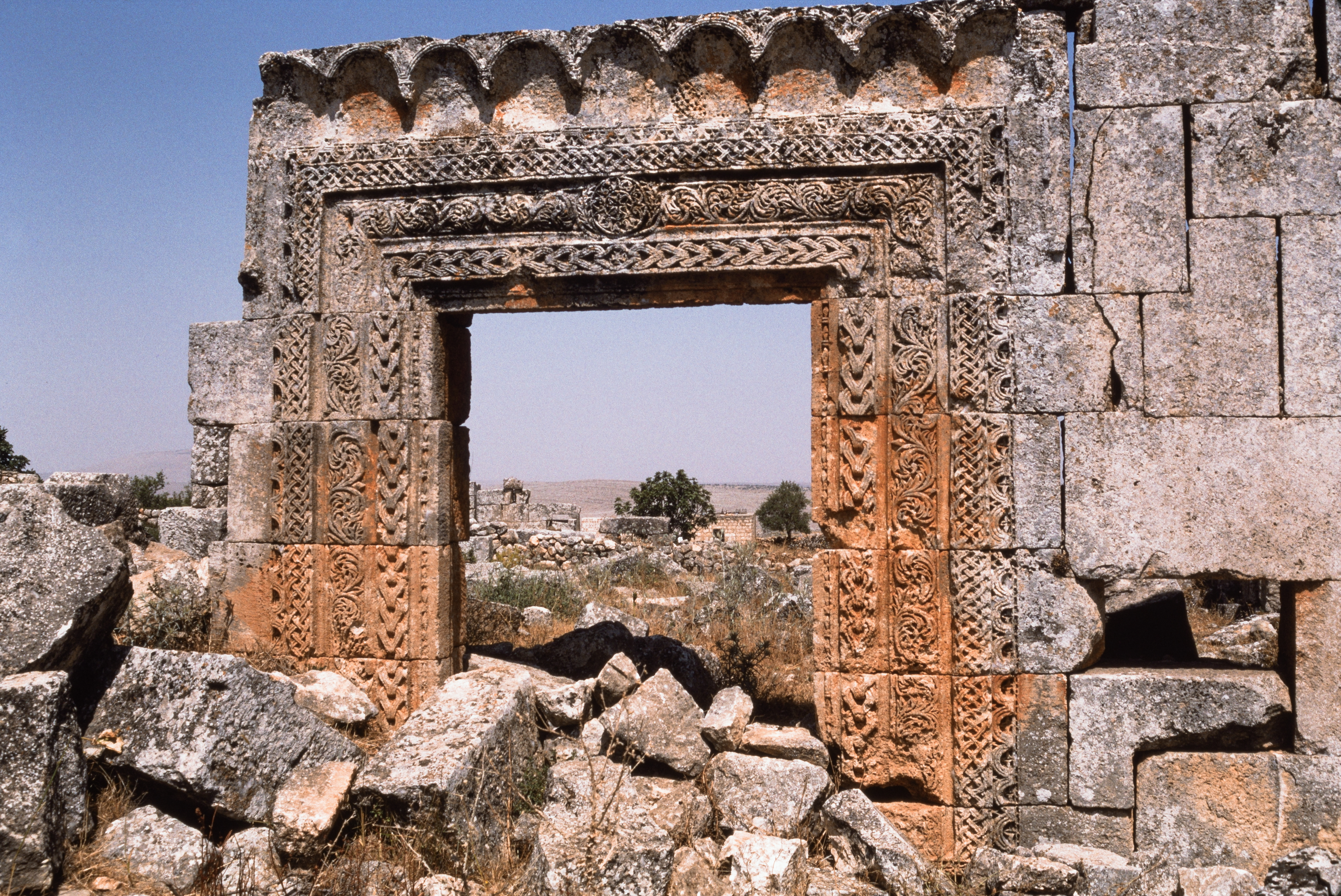
Markianos Church (East Church), Babisqa - East facade of room adjacent to basilica, view from atrium

The church has two entrances on the south wall that open upon an atrium. The central nave is broad and flanked by unequal aisles. The chancel arch is high and molded, with tall arcade columns.

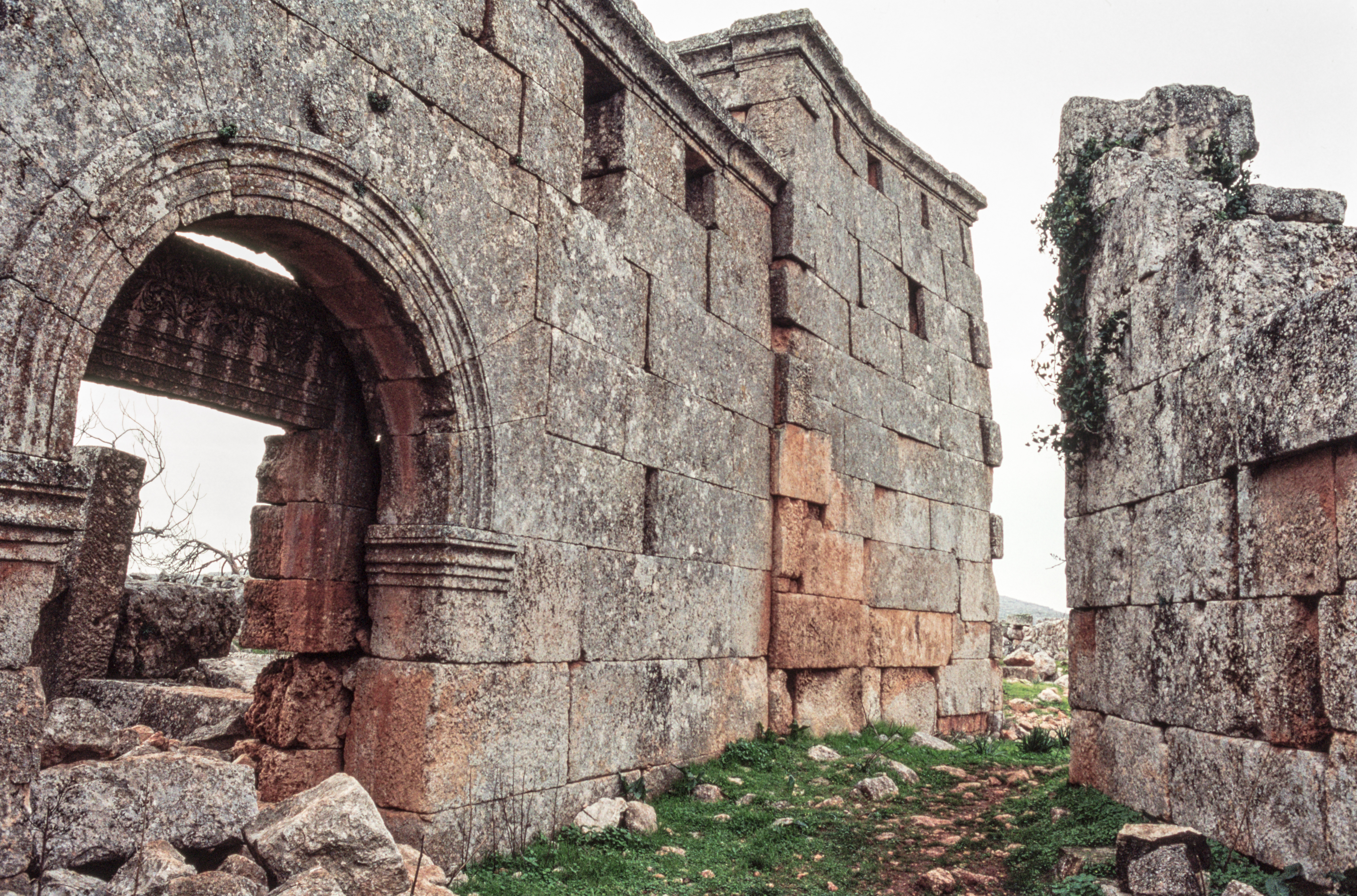
Markianos Church (East Church), Babisqa - West facade of atrium

The southeastern atrium entrance extends to a space that likely served as either a baptistery or martyrion. The ornament includes several layers of thick braided molding with a medallion in the center, as well as a scalloped cornice above, typical of 5th century Byzantine architectural design. The west wall was likely rebuilt in the late 5th century, as a doorway on the west side of the atrium stands unusually inside the arch, and has an inscription dating to October 480 CE.

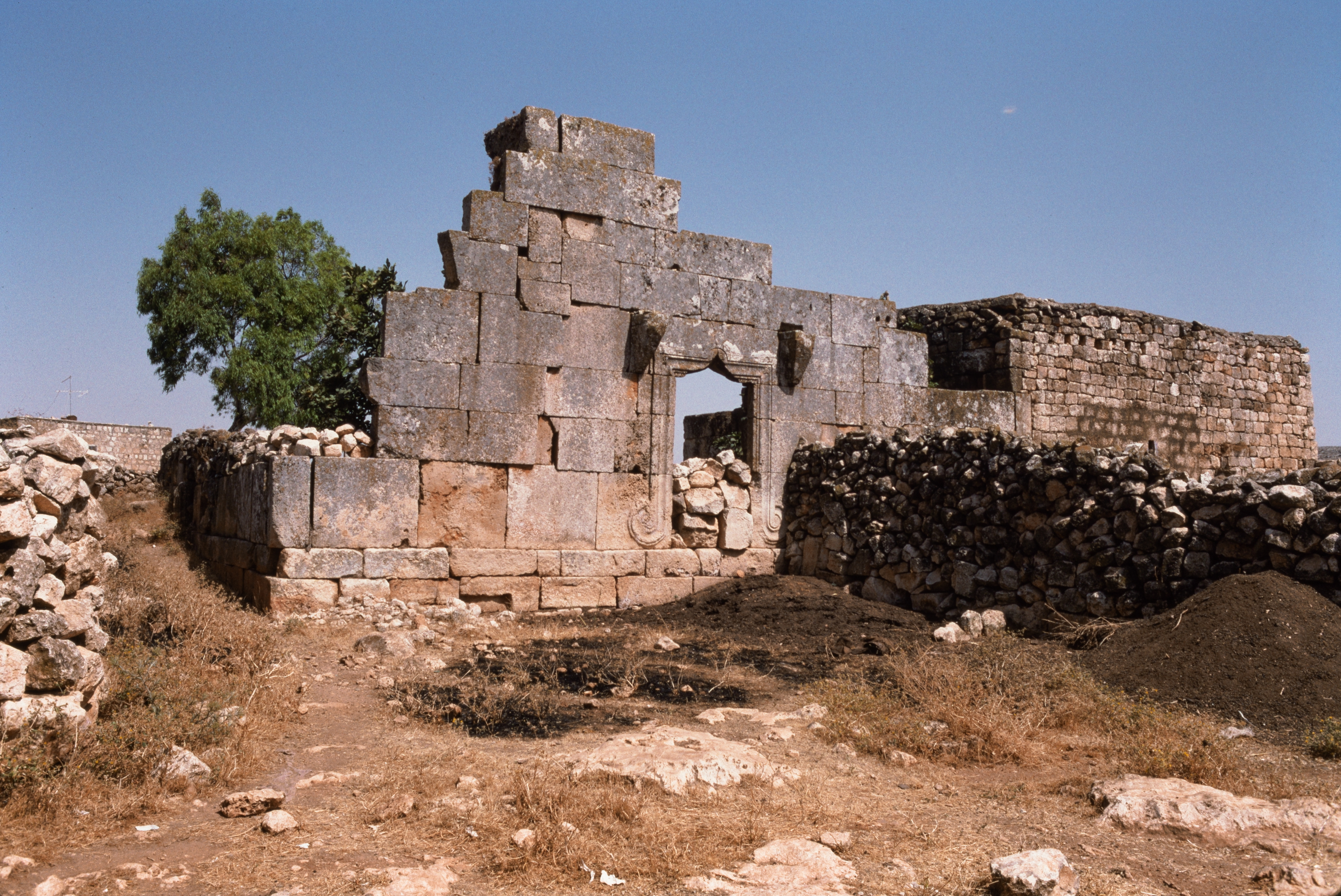
Church of St. Sergius (West Church), Babisqa - West facade

The west church is the latest dated Byzantine church in northern Syria and is dedicated to Saint Sergius. It has a 4-bay nave, and rectangular presbyterium with square side chambers. The preserved west wall bears an inscription in the doorway, indicating the church's 609-610 CE date. The east wall has a sanctuary window. A pier on the south side of the chancel arch still stands, while side walls, interior arches, and upper parts of the east end's side chambers have fallen. The west entrance features curvilinear moldings, a popular decorative type employed in the late 6th century.

== Syrian Civil War ==
Babisqa is located near Bab al-Hawa, a contested area along the Syrian-Turkish border crossing. Babisqa has thus become a military site throughout the Syrian Civil War, functioning as a storage depot for the supreme military council of the Free Syrian Army and acting as a battleground for military violence.
