= Jarada =

Jarada جرادة
- Village
- Location in Syria
- Coordinates: 35°43′24″N 36°42′49″E
- Country: Syria
- Governorate: Idlib
- District: Maarrat al-Nu'man District
- Subdistrict: Maarrat al-Nu'man Nahiyah

Population (2004)
  - Total: 837
- Time zone: UTC+2 (EET)
  - Summer (DST): UTC+3 (EEST)
- City Qrya Pcode: C3955

Jarada (Arabic: جرادة) is a village in Maarrat al-Nu'man Nahiyah in Maarrat al-Nu'man District, Idlib Governorate, Syria. Its population was 837 in the 2004 census. It is the location of one of the many Dead Cities in Syria.

== Archaeological Remains ==
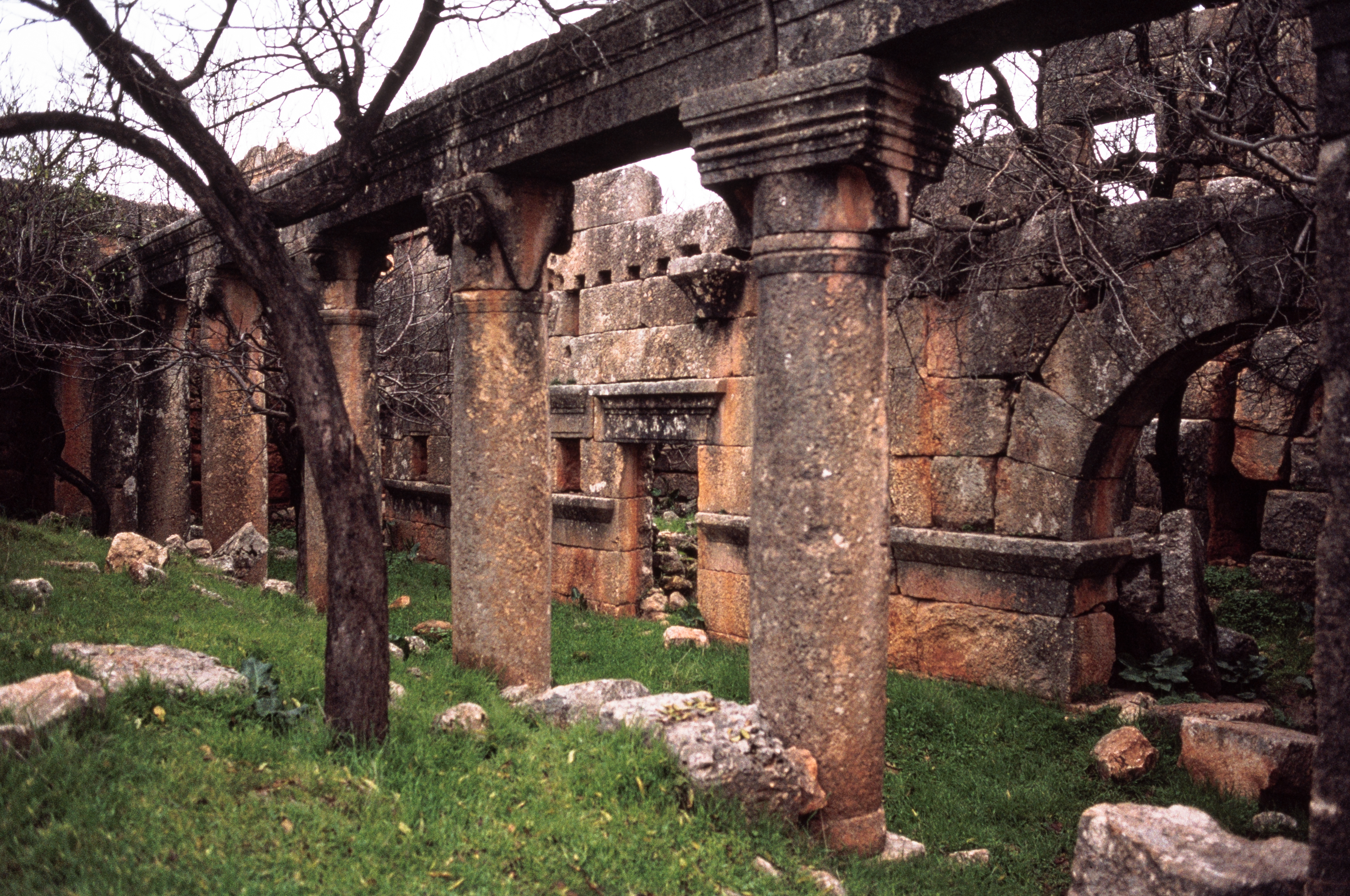
Portico of dwelling, Jarada. Photo by Frank Kidner, 1999.

Many of the buildings in Jarada are well-preserved. Archaeological remains include 96 houses with 291 rooms, two towers, and stables. There were two freestanding towers at Jarada, one with six stories and one with three. The six-story tower was used for surveillance and defense. However, the presence of latrine extensions also suggests that it could also have been used as a permanent habitat. The three-story tower at Jarada had a middle floor serving as a porter's lodge, and an open, loggia-style third story. The entrance to the tower opens into a courtyard. One house from the 6th century features a doorway that opens into the street. On the opposite side of the threshold is an irregularly shaped courtyard, with the family home to the left. Mangers on the ground floor of the home confirm that it was also used as a stable for animals, with the family living on the upper floor. The upper floor was accessed through an outdoor staircase, connecting the courtyard to the second story. Not much remains of the church at Jarada, located near the center of the town. The nave had six bays, there were no straight walls between the aisle chambers and the apse, and there was a two-story tower attached to the north end of the narthex. There were also clerical residences adjoining the church.
