= Behyo =

Village in northwestern Syria

Coordinates: 36°09′09″N 36°34′45″E

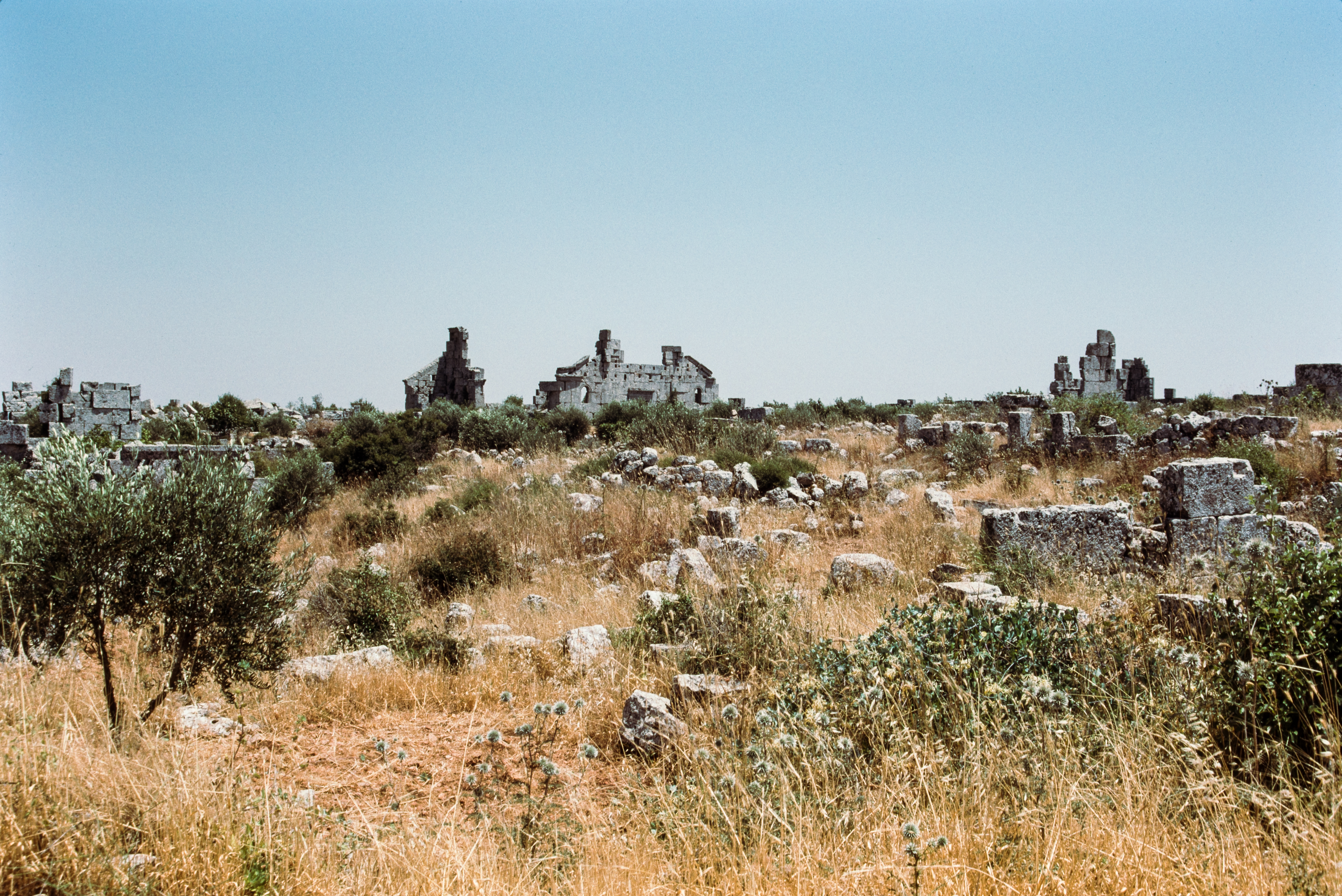
Behyo - General view of the 5th c. church and site from the northwest

Behyo (بحيو) is a village in northwestern Syria, located on the Jebel al’Ala region of the Dead Cities. The town was built in the 5th and 6th centuries, motivated by a prospering olive oil trade. Archaeological remains include two churches, olive presses, villas and other dwellings. In 2011, the village was named a UNESCO World Heritage Site as part of the Dead Cities.

== Location ==
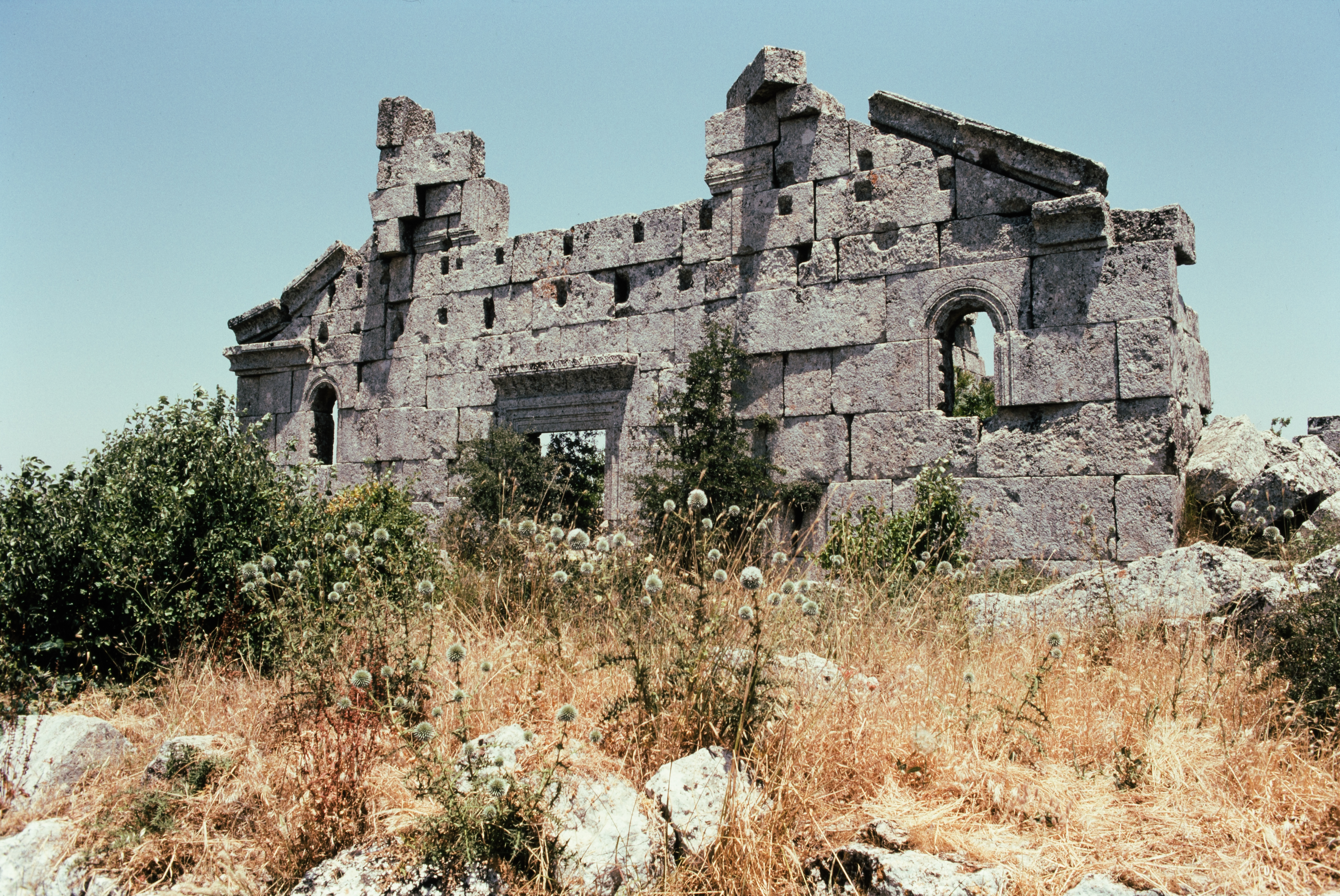
Church, Behyo - West facade

Behyo sits on the crest of Jebl al’Ala, the highest of the local mountain ranges and looks down over the Plain of Self. Due to the surrounding arid landscape, Behyo did not develop until later. The lack of arable land prevented settlement until the 5th century, when olive oil prices spiked and trade activities were controlled by individual merchants. Today, the village sits amidst a vast expanse of olive groves; olive presses that remain at the settlement are evidence of this historical agricultural community.

== Archaeological Remains ==
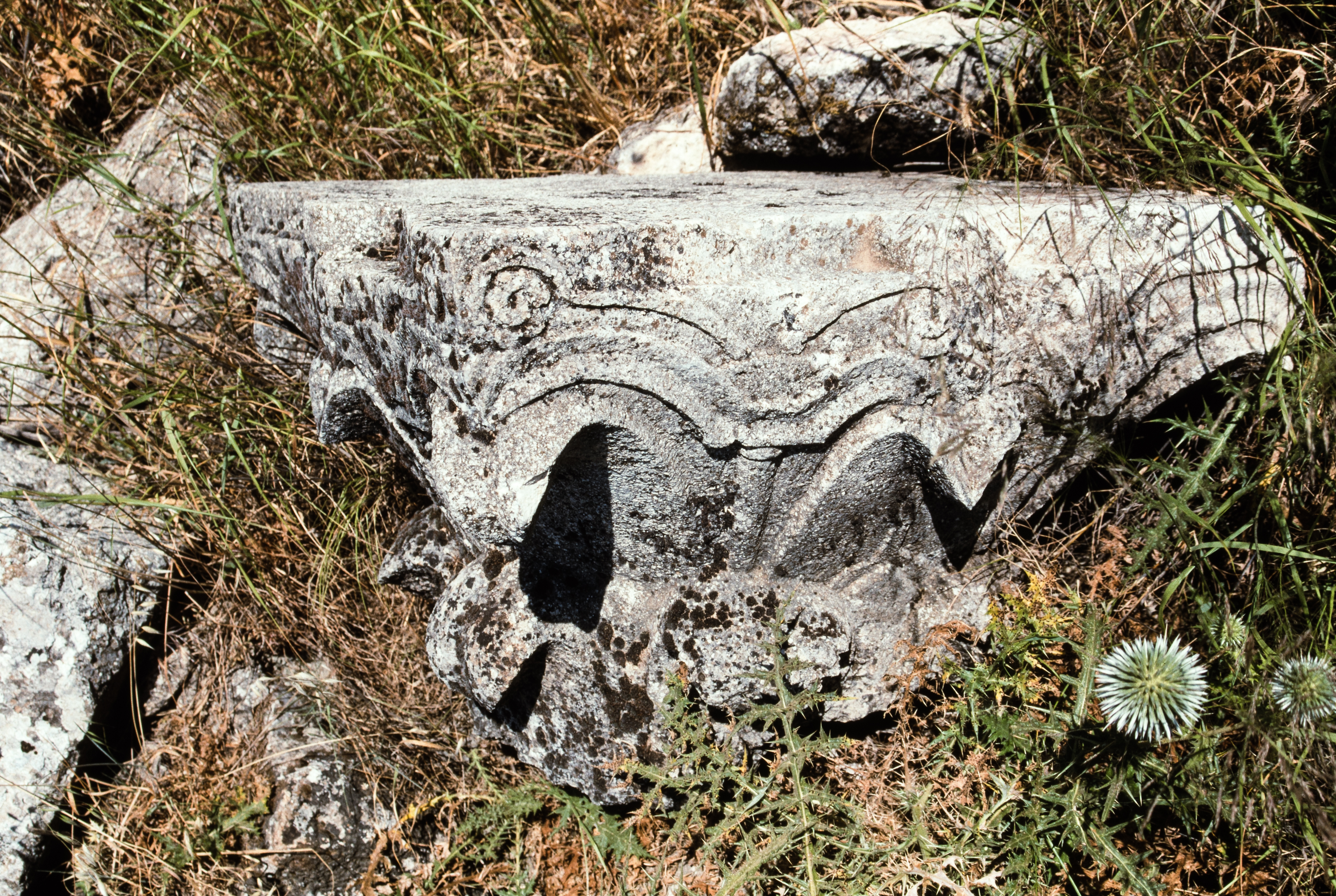
Behyo - Detail of capital

Archaeological remains include two churches that lie just east of the settlement, olive presses, and various dwellings.

Of the two eastern churches, the southwest basilica dates to the mid-5th century. Its west wall and north side of the apse are preserved. The west façade is relatively simple, with only arched windows, a gable roof, and a doorway lintel with a medallion (my observation from Kidner). The central nave has five columns on each side. There is also a visible bema that is horseshoe-shaped.

The church northeast of the 5th-century church dates to the early 6th century. Little survives from this church, but scholars have observed sweeping lateral arches. Other remains include olive presses, which survive at the edge of the village ruins. There are also some unidentified buildings, which have decorated lintels, as well as architectural fragments, such as capitals.

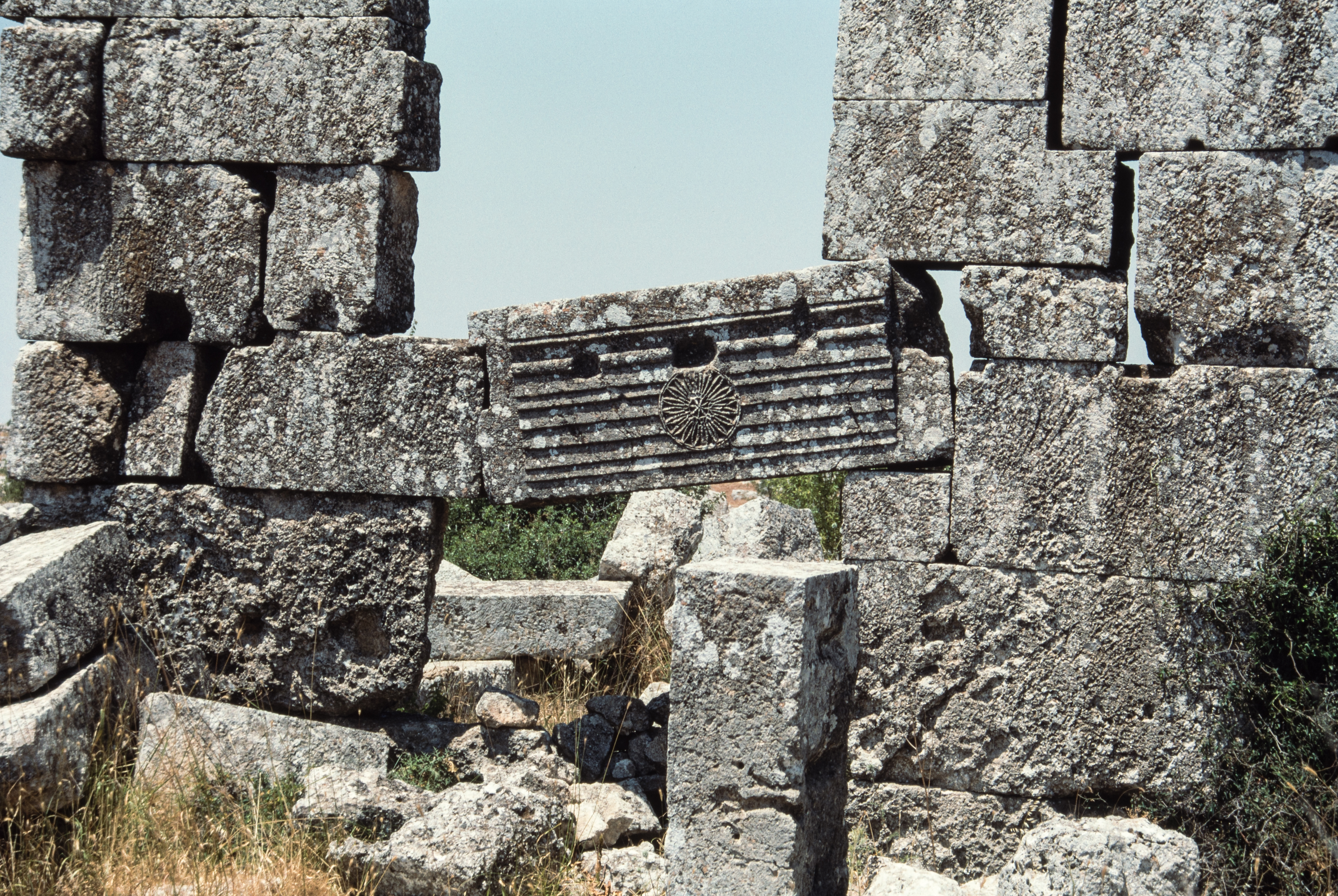
Behyo - Unidentified structure, detail of lintel
