= Banabil =

Banabil بنابل
- Village
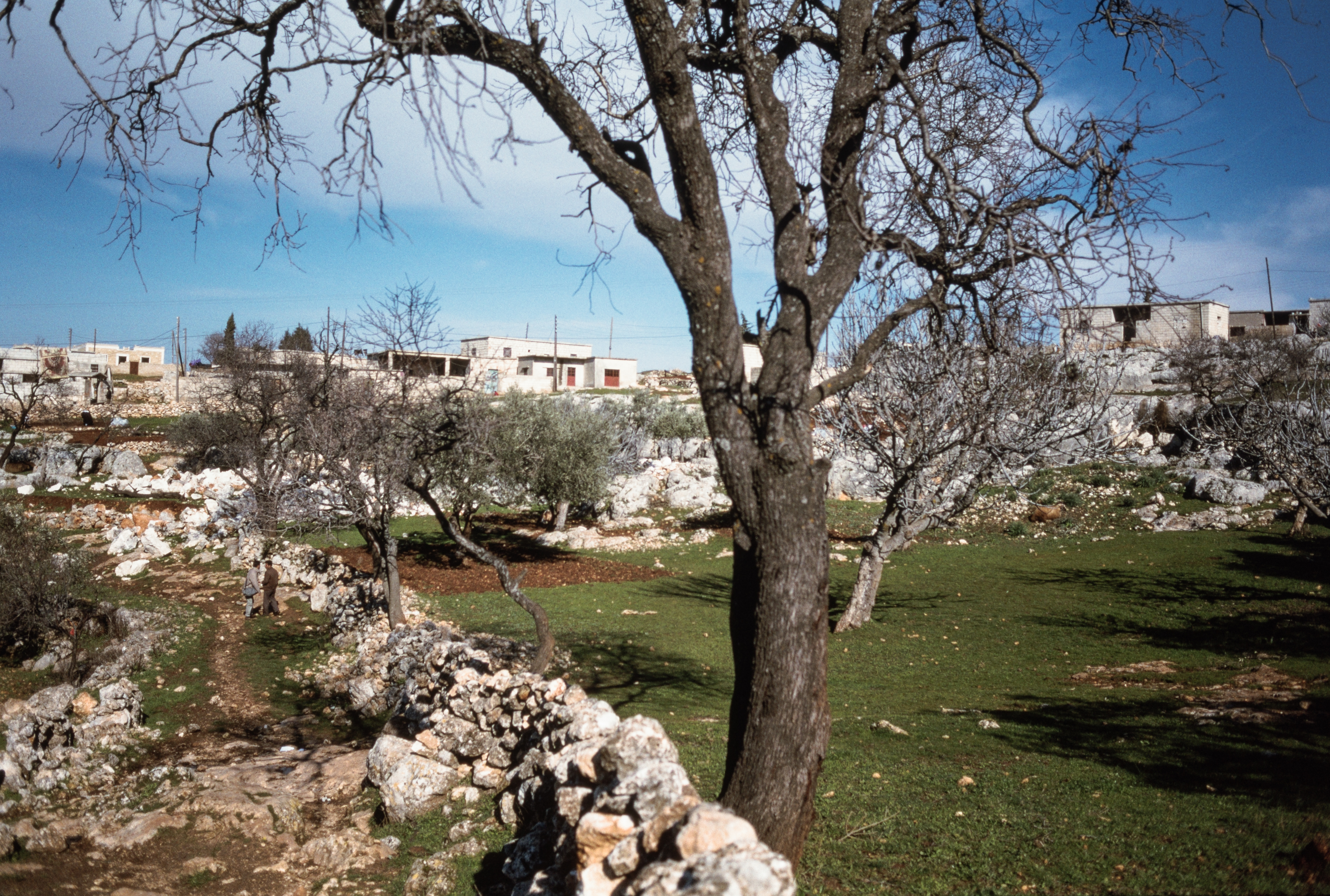
- Banabil in the 1990s

- Location within Syria
- Coordinates: 36°12′1″N 36°33′44″E
- Country: Syria
- Governorate: Idlib
- District: Harem
- Subdistrict: Qurqania Nahiyah

Population (2004)
  - Total: 542
- Time zone: UTC+2 (EET)
  - Summer (DST): UTC+3 (EEST)

Banabil (Arabic: بنابل, also spelled Benabel or Bnabel) is a village in northwestern Syria, administratively part of the Harem District of the Idlib Governorate. Nearby localities include Harem to the west, Qalb Loze to the south, and the Turkish city of Reyhanli to the north. According to the Syria Central Bureau of Statistics, Banabil had a population of 542 in the 2004 census. Its inhabitants are predominantly Druze.

== Bibliography ==
- Boulanger, Robert (1966). The Middle East, Lebanon, Syria, Jordan, Iraq, Iran. Hachette.
