= Kafr Aruq =

Kafr Aruq كفر عروق
- Village
- Location in Syria
- Coordinates: 36°7′14″N 36°39′21″E
- Country: Syria
- Governorate: Idlib
- District: Harem District
- Subdistrict: Qurqania Nahiyah

Population (2004)
  - Total: 1,739
- Time zone: UTC+2 (EET)
  - Summer (DST): UTC+3 (EEST)
- City Qrya Pcode: C4172

Kafr Aruq (Arabic: كفر عروق) is a Syrian village located in Qurqania Nahiyah in Harem District, Idlib. According to the Syria Central Bureau of Statistics (CBS), Kafr Aruq had a population of 1,739 in the 2004 census.
