= Rweideh, Idlib =

Rweideh, Idlib الرويضة
- Village
- Location in Syria
- Country: Syria
- Governorate: Idlib
- District: Maarrat al-Nu'man District
- Subdistrict: Al-Tamanah Nahiyah

Population (2004)
  - Total: 920
- Time zone: UTC+2 (EET)
  - Summer (DST): UTC+3 (EEST)
- City Qrya Pcode: C4092

Rweideh, Idlib (Arabic: الرويضة, also spelled Ruweiha, Al-Ruwaiha and Ar-Ruwayhah) is a Syrian village located in Al-Tamanah Nahiyah in Maarrat al-Nu'man District, Idlib. According to the Syria Central Bureau of Statistics (CBS), Rweideh, Idlib had a population of 920 in the 2004 census.

== History ==
The village of Rweideh was once the site of a substantial Roman and Byzantine era settlement. Ruins of numerous churches, tombs and houses dated from the 4th through 6th century AD remain visible in the area.

The village was captured by anti-government forces relatively early in the war, but the Syrian army retook most of it by March 2020. However, the settlement's outskirts are still controlled by the opposition and there have been numerous clashes in the vicinity in recent years.
