= Surqaniya =

Village in northwestern Syria

Coordinates: 36°18′59″N 36°54′02″E

Surqaniya (سرقانيا) is a village in northwestern Syria, in the Jebel Sem’an region of the Dead Cities. In 2011, the village was named a UNESCO World Heritage Site as part of the Dead Cities.

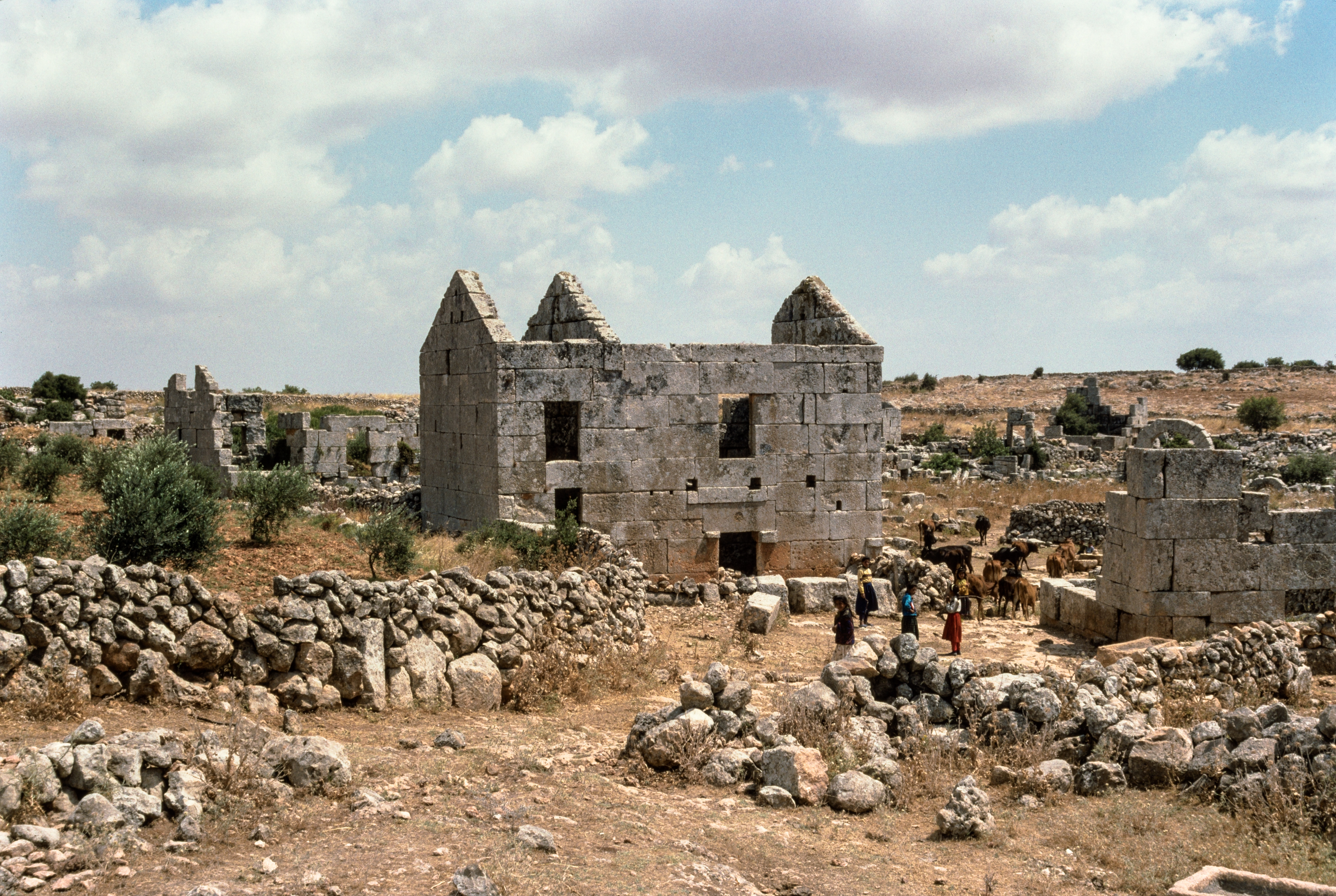
House, Surqaniya, - View from the southwest

== Location ==
Surqaniya is part of the Aleppo Governorate, west of the nation’s capital. It is located just south of an ancient road. Historically, there was a spring in the town, which fed a stream flowing south through the valley.

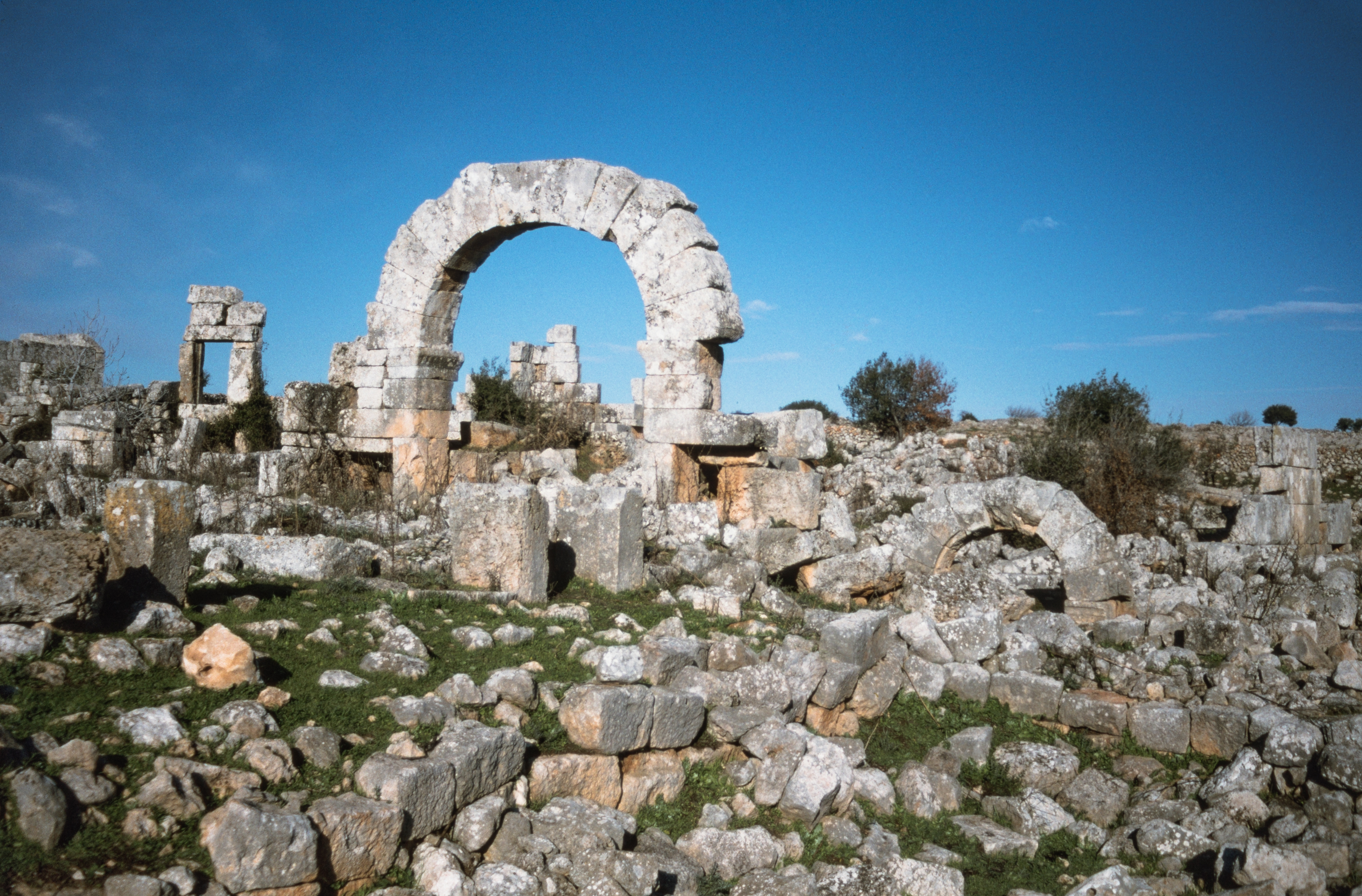
4th-5th c. CE Church, Surqaniya - East end

== Archaeological Remains ==
The structures that still stand in Surqaniya include a cluster of houses, a fourth-century church, and a small well-preserved sixth-century church at the southern outskirts of the village.

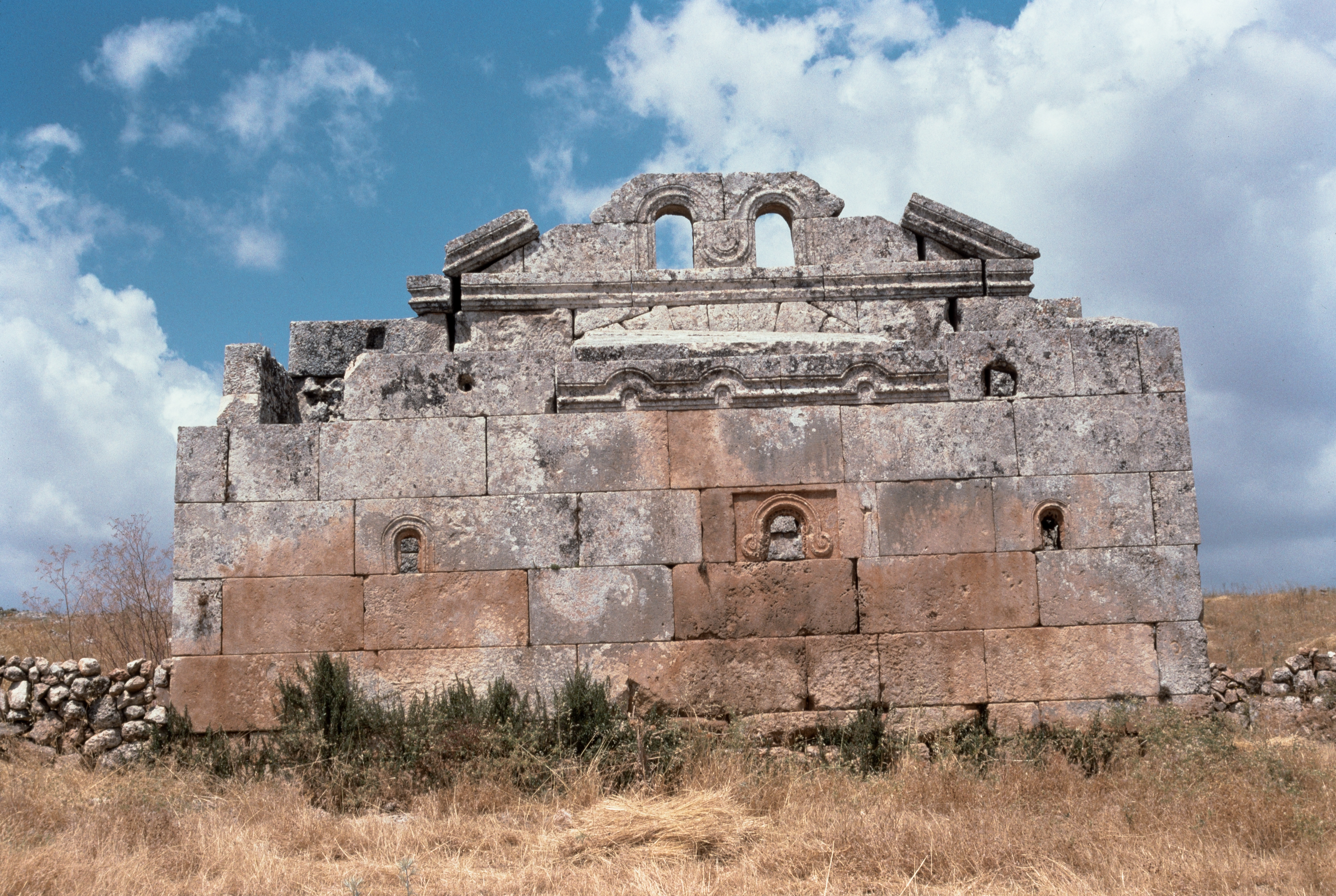
6th c. CE Church, Surqaniya, - East façade

There is a villa just west of the settlement, whose upper walls still stand. Christian symbols adorn entrances on the south façade, and the east side still holds a balcony floor. Measuring 12 x 7 meters, scholars identify this structure as an inn. The ground floor interior walls are adorned with votive columns and crosses, lit by five small windows. The room is split into equal parts.

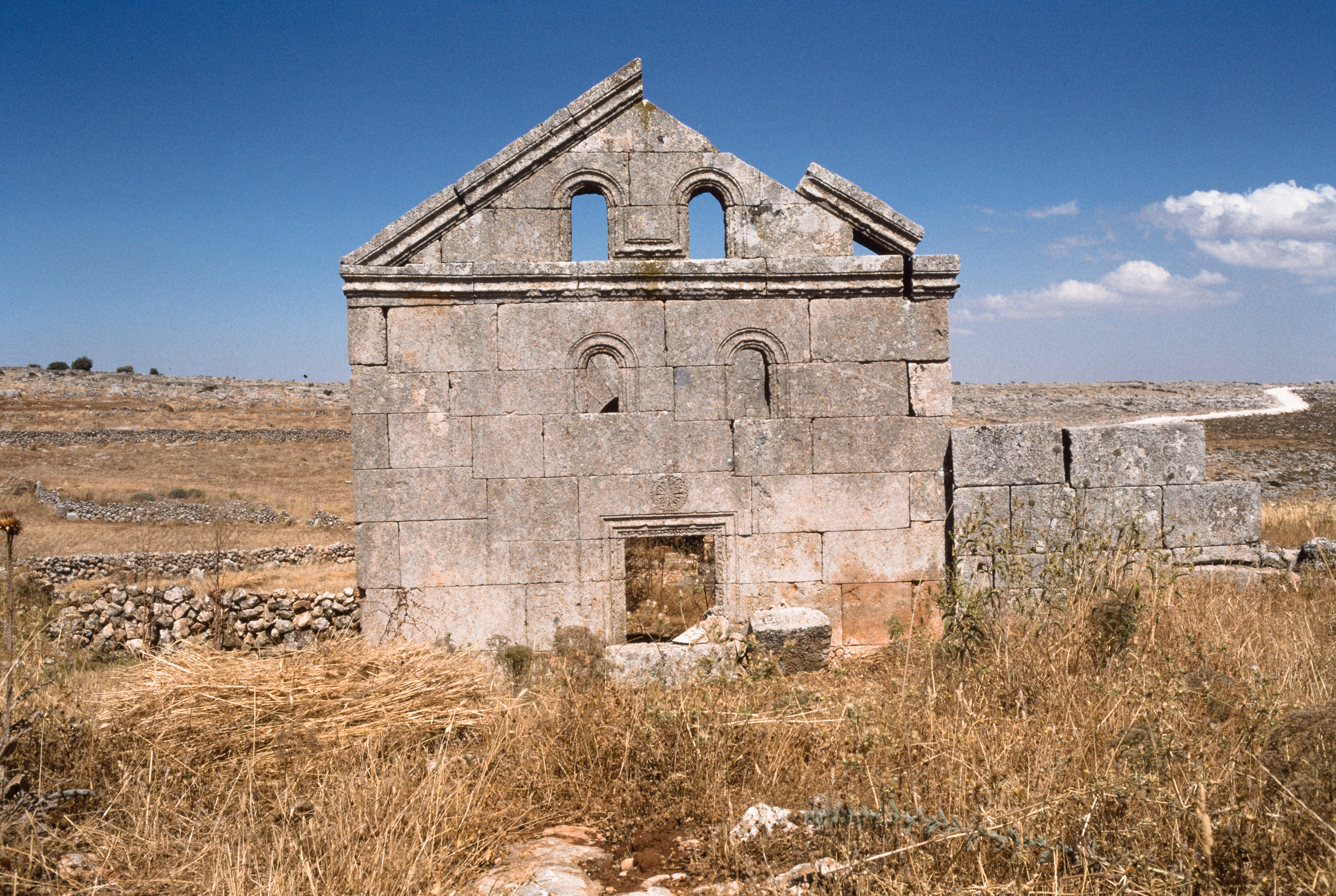
6th c. CE Church, Surqaniya- West façade

The fourth-century, single-nave church is located near the center of the cluster of houses. The church is poorly preserved, with only the triumphal arch doorway of the sanctuary and apse walls surviving. In the fifth century, the apse of the nave was flanked by a second apse, presumably used for baptismal purposes.

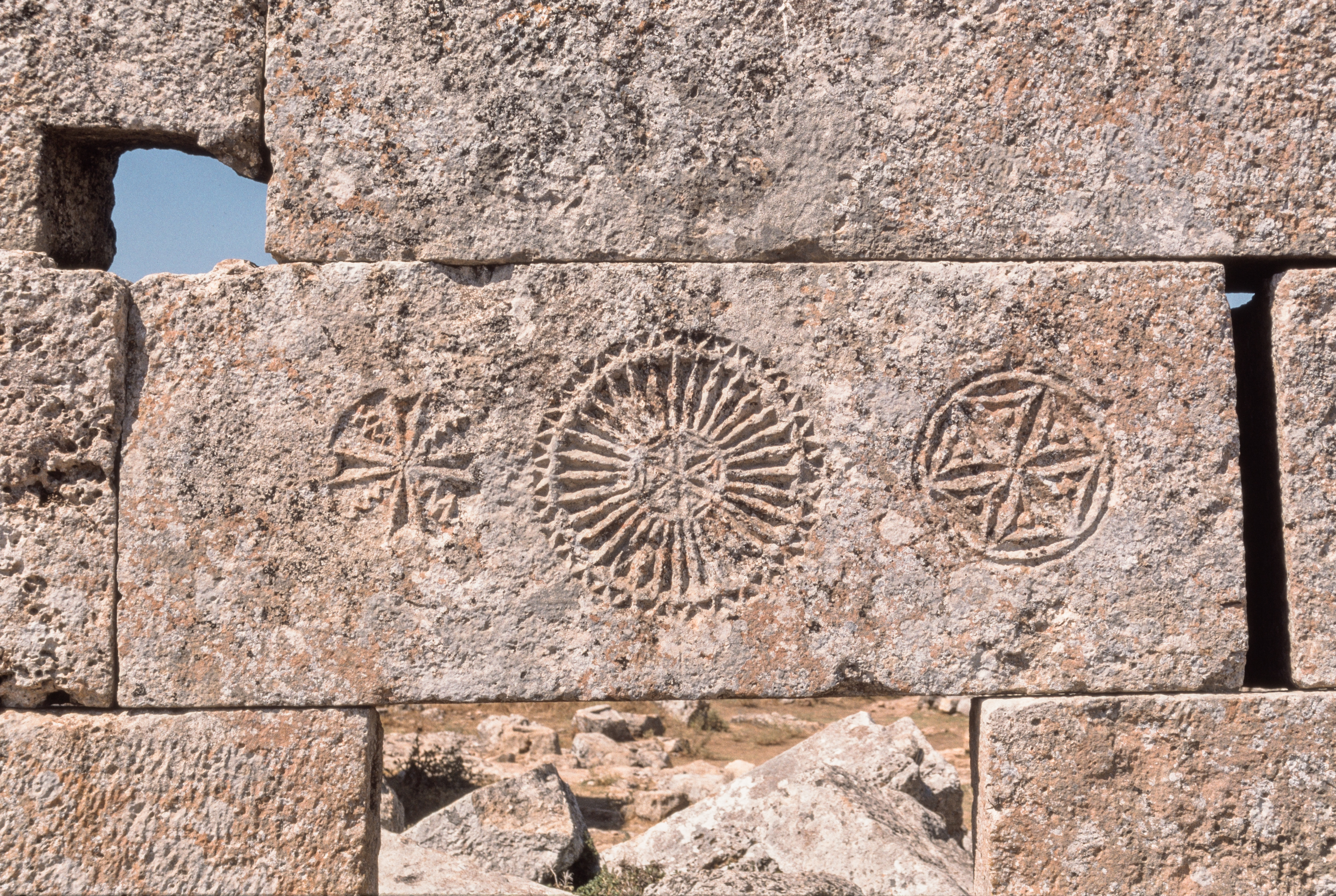
Unidentified Building, Surqaniya - Door detail, south façade

The larger, sixth-century chapel is situated about 100 meters south of the modern road. It has a single nave, with the sanctuary at the east end extending southward beyond the nave. The chapel’s condition is notably well-preserved, including the roof over the sanctuary. The building’s south chamber reaches higher than the surrounding buildings, and likely had a pyramidal wooden roof.

== See also ==
- Fafertin
