= Farkya =

Farkya فركيا
- Village
- Location in Syria
- Coordinates: 35°43′30″N 36°35′55″E
- Country: Syria
- Governorate: Idlib
- District: Ariha District
- Subdistrict: Ihsim Nahiyah

Population (2004)
  - Total: 1,264
- Time zone: UTC+2 (EET)
  - Summer (DST): UTC+3 (EEST)
- City Qrya Pcode: C4305

Farkya (Arabic: فركيا) is a Syrian village located in Ihsim Nahiyah in Ariha District, Idlib. According to the Syria Central Bureau of Statistics (CBS), Farkya had a population of 1264 in the 2004 census.
