= Maghara =

Maghara المغارة
- Village
- Location in Syria
- Coordinates: 35°44′03.43″N 36°35′12.27″E
- Country: Syria
- Governorate: Idlib
- District: Ariha District
- Subdistrict: Ihsim Nahiyah

Population (2004)
  - Total: 1,122
- Time zone: UTC+2 (EET)
  - Summer (DST): UTC+3 (EEST)
- City Qrya Pcode: C4300

Maghara (Arabic: المغارة) is a Syrian village located in Ihsim Nahiyah in Ariha District, Idlib. According to the Syria Central Bureau of Statistics (CBS), Maghara had a population of 1,122 in the 2004 census.
