= Babuline =

Babuline بابولين
- Village
- Location in Syria
- Coordinates: 35°32′16″N 36°40′43″E
- Country: Syria
- Governorate: Idlib
- District: Maarrat al-Nu'man District
- Subdistrict: Hish Nahiyah

Population (2004)
  - Total: 2,322
- Time zone: UTC+2 (EET)
  - Summer (DST): UTC+3 (EEST)
- City Qrya Pcode: C4100

Babuline (Arabic: بابولين) is a Syrian village located in Hish Nahiyah in Maarrat al-Nu'man District, Idlib. According to the Syria Central Bureau of Statistics (CBS), Babuline had a population of 2,322 in the 2004 census.

== Syrian Civil War ==
On 7 June 2019, several civilians were killed in an airstrike carried out by either Russia or the Syrian regime. In late December 2019, the town was retaken by the Syrian regime during the 2019–2020 northwestern Syria offensive.
