= Bshendlaya - Rashadiya =

Bshendlaya - Rashadiya بشندلايا رشادية
- Village
- Location in Syria
- Coordinates: 36°8′35″N 36°33′29″E
- Country: Syria
- Governorate: Idlib
- District: Harem District
- Subdistrict: Kafr Takharim Nahiyah

Population (2004)
  - Total: 95
- Time zone: UTC+2 (EET)
  - Summer (DST): UTC+3 (EEST)
- City Qrya Pcode: C4153

Bshendlaya - Rashadiya (Arabic: بشندلايا رشادية) is a Syrian village located in Kafr Takharim Nahiyah in Harem District, Idlib. According to the Syria Central Bureau of Statistics (CBS), Bshendlaya - Rashadiya had a population of 95 in the 2004 census. It is a Druze village of the Jabal al-Sumaq region.
