= Ein Laruz =

Ein Laruz عين لاروز
- Village
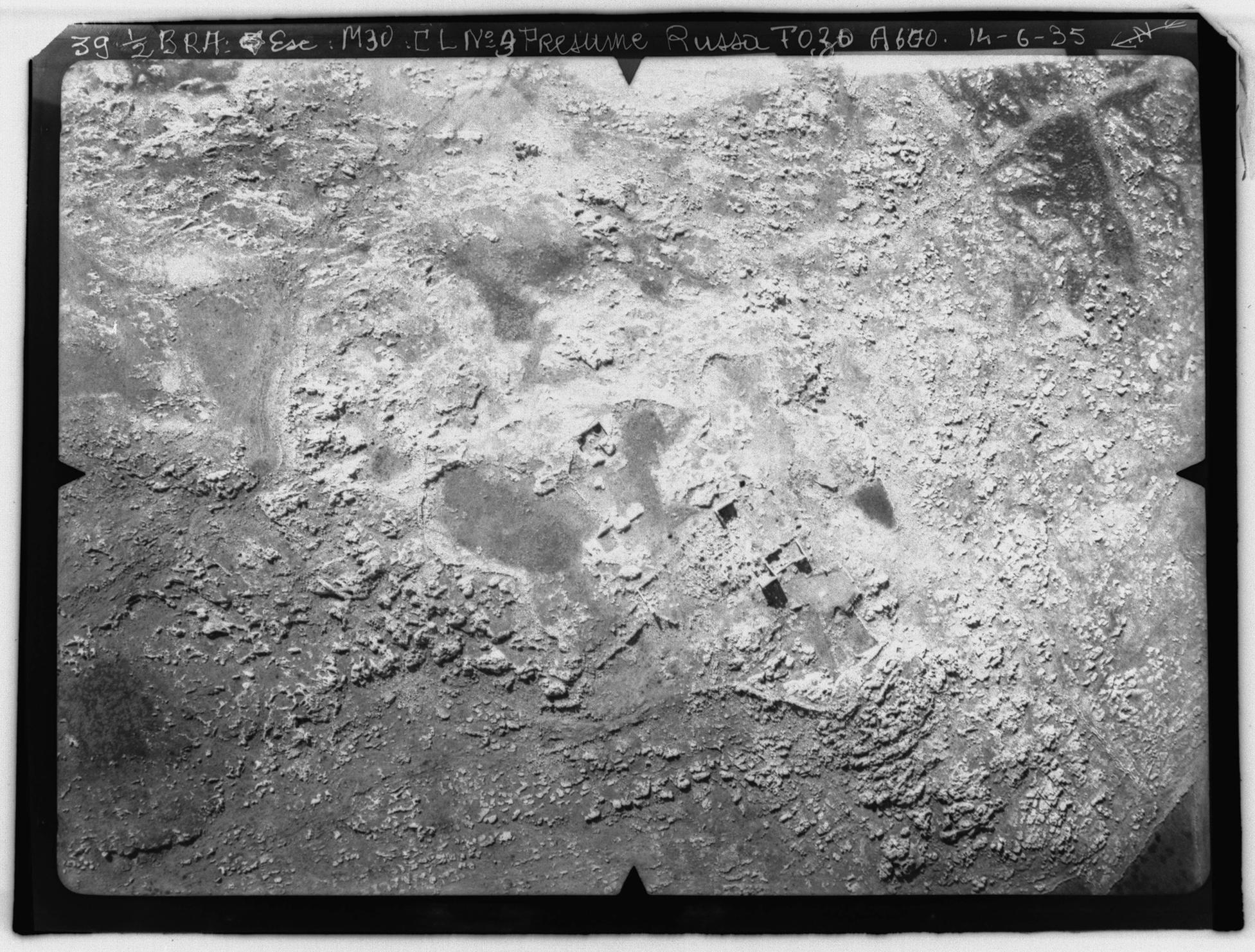
- 1935 aerial view of Ein Laruz

- Location in Syria
- Coordinates: 35°41′1″N 36°26′24″E
- Country: Syria
- Governorate: Idlib
- District: Ariha District
- Subdistrict: Ihsim Nahiyah

Population (2004)
  - Total: 2,687
- Time zone: UTC+2 (EET)
  - Summer (DST): UTC+3 (EEST)
- City Qrya Pcode: C4299

Ein Laruz (Arabic: عين لاروز) is a Syrian village located in Ihsim Nahiyah in Ariha District, Idlib. According to the Syria Central Bureau of Statistics (CBS), Ein Laruz had a population of 2687 in the 2004 census.
