= Al-Dana, Maarat al-Numan =

Al-Dana الدانا
- Village
- Location in Syria
- Coordinates: 35°41′57″N 36°41′21″E
- Country: Syria
- Governorate: Idlib
- District: Maarrat al-Nu'man District
- Subdistrict: Maarrat al-Nu'man Nahiyah

Population (2004)
  - Total: 2,607
- Time zone: UTC+2 (EET)
  - Summer (DST): UTC+3 (EEST)
- City Qrya Pcode: C3965

Al-Dana (Arabic: الدانا) is a Syrian village located in Maarat al-Numan Subdistrict in Maarat al-Numan District, Idlib. According to the Syria Central Bureau of Statistics (CBS), Al-Dana had a population of 2607 in the 2004 census.
