= Al-Nusra Front =

Salafi jihadist organization in the Syrian civil war (2012–2017)

- جبهة النصرة لأهل الشام
- Flag of Jabhat Al-Nusra (2012–2016) Flag of Jabhat Fatah Al-Sham (2016–2017)
- Leader: Abu Mohammad al-Julani Other leaders: Abu Abdullah al-Shami (senior member) Ahmad Salama Mabruk † (senior member) Abu Hajer al-Homsi † (top military commander) Abu Omar al-Turkistani † (top military commander)
- Dates active: 23 January 2012 – 28 January 2017
- Split from: Islamic State of Iraq (April 2013)
- Group: See al-Nusra member groups
- Active regions: Syria (mainly in northwestern Syria, around Idlib and Aleppo Governorates); Lebanon (2013–2017)
- Ideology: Sunni Islamism: Salafism; Islamic fundamentalism; Wahhabism; Salafi jihadism
- Size: 6,000–10,000 (2012); 7,000 (2013); 5,000–10,000 (2016)
- Part of: Al-Qaeda (2012–2016)
- Wars: Syrian Civil War: Battle of Aleppo (2012–16); Rojava–Islamist conflict; Siege of Nubl and Al-Zahraa; Quneitra Governorate clashes (2012–2014); Operation al-Shabah; 2013 Latakia offensive; Inter-rebel conflict during the Syrian Civil War; Al-Otaiba ambush; 2014 Idlib offensive; Battle of Dama; al-Nusra Front–Syria Revolutionaries Front conflict; 2015 Idlib offensive (Second Battle of Idlib); Siege of al-Fu'ah and Kafriya; Battle of Bosra (2015); 2015 Jisr al-Shughur offensive; Battle of Yarmouk Camp (2015); Qalamoun offensive (May 2015); Battle of Zabadani (2015); 2015 Hama Offensive; Northern Aleppo offensive (2016); Idlib Governorate clashes (2017); Syrian Civil War spillover in Lebanon; Battle of Arsal (2014); Qalamoun offensive (2014); Military intervention against ISIL; American-led intervention in Syria; Russian military intervention in Syria

Jabhat Al-Nusra, (Note: Arabic: جبهة النصرة لأهل الشام, romanized: Jabhat an-Nuṣrah li-Ahl ash-Shām, lit. 'Front of the Supporters of the People of the Levant') also referred to as Al-Nusra Front and later known as Jabhat Fatah Al-Sham (Note: Arabic: جبهة فتح الشام, romanized: Jabhat Fatḥ ash-Shām, lit. 'Front for the Conquest of the Levant'.) was a Sunni Islamist political organization and paramilitary group that fought against Ba'athist regime forces in the Syrian civil war. Its aim was to overthrow Syrian president Bashar al-Assad and establish an Islamic state ruled by Sharia in Syria.

Formed in 2012 by Ahmed al-Sharaa, The Washington Post described Al-Nusra Front in November of that year as "the most aggressive and successful" of the rebel forces. While secular and pro-democratic rebel groups of the Syrian revolution such as the Free Syrian Army were focused on ending the decades-long reign of the Assad family, Al-Nusra Front also sought the unification of Islamist forces in Syria, anticipating a new stage of the civil war. It denounced the international assistance in support of the Syrian opposition as "imperialism"; viewing it as a long-term threat to its Islamist goals in Syria.

In December 2012, the US Department of State designated it as a "foreign terrorist organization". In April 2013, Al-Nusra Front was publicly confirmed as the official Syrian affiliate of Al-Qaeda, after Al-Qaeda Emir Ayman Al-Zawahiri rejected the legitimacy of Abu Bakr Al-Baghdadi, leader of the newly-formed Islamic State. In March 2015, the militia joined other Syrian Islamist groups to form a joint command center called the Army of Conquest. In July 2016, Al-Nusra announced that it was breaking ties with Al-Qaeda and re-named itself to Jabhat Fatah Al-Sham ("Front for the Conquest of the Levant").

The announcement caused defections of senior Al-Nusra commanders and criticism from Al-Qaeda ranks: Al-Qaeda Emir Ayman Al-Zawahiri denounced the move as an "act of disobedience". On 28 January 2017, following violent clashes with Ahrar Al-Sham and other rebel groups, Jabhat Fatah Al-Sham (JFS) merged with four other groups to form Hay'at Tahrir Al-Sham (HTS), a new Sunni Islamist militant group. Hay'at Tahrir Al-Sham denies any links to the Al-Qaeda network and said in a statement that the group is "an independent entity and not an extension of previous organizations or factions". Mutual hostility progressively deteriorated into violent confrontations, with Al-Nusra commander Sami al-Oraydi accusing HTS of adopting nationalist doctrines. Sami Al-Oraydi, alongside other Al-Qaeda loyalists like Abu Humam Al-Shami, Abu Julaybib and others, mobilised Al-Qaeda personnel in northwestern Syria to establish an anti-HTS front in the region, eventually forming Hurras Al-Din on 27 February 2018.

== Name ==
From 2012 to 2013, Al-Nusra Front's full name was the "Support Front for the People of the Levant by the Mujahideen of the Levant on the Fields of Jihad" (Arabic: جبهة النصرة لأهل الشام من مجاهدين الشام في ساحات الجهاد, romanized: Jabhat an-Nuṣrāh li-ahli ash-Shām min Mujāhidīn ash-Shām fī Sahat al-Jihād).

== Ideology ==
Al-Nusra Front was estimated to be primarily made up of Syrian jihadists. Its goals were to overthrow Bashar al-Assad's government in Syria and to create an Islamic emirate ruled by Sharia, with an emphasis from an early stage on focusing on the "near enemy" of the Syrian regime rather than on global jihad. Syrian members of the group claimed that they are fighting only the Assad regime and would not attack Western states; while the official policy of the group was to regard the United States and Israel as enemies of Islam, and to warn against Western intervention in Syria, Al-Nusra Front leader Abu Mohammad al-Julani stated that "We are only here to accomplish one mission, to fight the regime and its agents on the ground, including Hezbollah and others". In early 2014, Sami al-Oraydi, a top sharia official in the group, acknowledged that it is influenced by the teachings of Al-Qaeda member Abu Musab al-Suri. The strategies derived from Abu Musab's guidelines included providing services to people, avoiding being seen as extremists, maintaining strong relationships with local communities and other fighting groups, and putting the focus on fighting the government.

The tactics of Al-Nusra Front differed markedly from those of its rival jihadist group ISIL; whereas ISIL has alienated local populations by demanding their allegiance and carrying out beheadings, Al-Nusra Front cooperated with other militant groups and declined to impose the sharia where there has been opposition. Analysts have noted this could have given the Al-Nusra Front a greater long-term advantage.

In early 2015, Al-Qaeda leader Ayman al-Zawahiri instructed Al-Nusra Front leader Al-Julani to pursue the following five goals:

1. Better integrate his movement within the Syrian revolution and its people
2. Coordinate more closely with all Islamic groups on the ground
3. Contribute towards the establishment of a Syria-wide Sharia judicial court system
4. Use strategic areas of the country to build a sustainable Al-Qaeda power base
5. Cease any activity linked to attacking the West

Both Al-Qaeda and Al-Nusra tried to take advantage of ISIL's rise by presenting themselves as "moderate" in comparison. While they had the same aim of establishing Sharia and an Islamic state, they intended to implement it in a more gradual manner. Al-Nusra criticized the way ISIL alienated people by precipitously instituting Sharia, preferring the more gradual approach favored by Al-Qaeda of preparing society through indoctrination and education before implementing the hudud (scripturally-mandated punishment) aspects of Sharia. They particularly criticised ISIL's enthusiasm for punishments such as amputation and stoning. However, Al-Qaeda agrees that hudud punishments should be implemented in the long term. The main criticism of defectors from ISIL is that the group is killing and fighting other Sunni Muslims, and that they are unhappy that other Sunnis like Jabhat Al-Nusra are being attacked by ISIL.

A video called The Heirs of Glory was issued by Al-Nusra in 2015, which included old audio by Osama bin Laden (such as his 1998 announcement that "So we seek to incite the Islamic Nation so it may rise to liberate its lands and perform Jihad in the path of Allah, and to establish the law of Allah, so the Word of Allah may be supreme"). The video glorified the 11 September attacks and the Islamists Sayyid Qutb and Abdullah Azzam. Its magazine, Al Risalah, was first issued in July 2015. In 2015 Al-Qaeda leader Al-Zawahiri urged ISIL fighters to unite with all other jihadists against their enemies and stop the infighting.

In an Amnesty International report in July 2016, the Al-Nusra Front was accused of torture, child abduction, and summary execution. In December 2014, Al-Nusra Front fighters executed a woman on accusations of adultery by shooting. They have also executed women accused of extramarital relations by stoning. Overall, they have "applied a strict interpretation of Shari'a and imposed punishments amounting to torture or other ill-treatment for perceived infractions."

=== Allegations of sectarianism ===
Members of the group were accused of attacking the religious beliefs of non-Sunnis in Syria, such as the Alawites. The New York Times journalist C. J. Chivers cites "some analysts and diplomats" as noting that Al-Nusra Front and the Islamic State "can appear less focused on toppling" the Assad government than on "establishing a zone of influence spanning Iraq's Anbar Province and the desert eastern areas of Syria and eventually establishing an Islamic territory under their administration".

On 10 June 2015, Al-Nusra fighters shot dead at least 20 Druze civilians in Qalb Loze after one of them, a supporter of the Assad regime, opposed the expropriation of his house by a Nusra commander. Al-Nusra's leadership issued an apology and claimed that the killings had been carried out against the group's guidelines. In an official statement issued a few days later, the organization expressed "deep regret" regarding the incident, acknowledging that the killings were carried out by certain members without orders from the leadership and in violation of the organization's policies. Al-Nusra Front also sent a delegation to the Druze community in the village and assured that the perpetrators of the massacre would be brought to trial in a Sharia court.

Analysts at the American magazine Foreign Affairs asserted that there was absolutely no reference to the Druze in Al-Nusra's "apology", claiming that Al-Nusra forced the Druze to renounce their religion, destroyed their shrines and now considers them Sunni. Emile Hokayem, senior fellow at the International Institute for Strategic Studies, asserted that the Al Jazeera news network was actively involved in the "mainstreaming" of the Al-Nusra Front in Syria.

== Flags ==
Flags of the al-Nusra Front
Variant flag of the al-Nusra Front, used 2012–2013

Flag of the al-Nusra Front, most commonly used until July 2016

Flag of Tanzim Qaidat al-Jihad fi Bilad al-Sham – Jabhat al-Nusra ("Organization of Jihad's Base in the Levant – Support Front") used from April 2013 to July 2016

Flag of Jabhat al-Nusra's branch in Lebanon used from 2013 to 2014

Variant flag of the al-Nusra Front, used 2012–16

Flag of Jabhat Fatah al-Sham, July 2016 – January 2017

Variant flag of Jabhat Fatah al-Sham, July 2016 – January 2017

== Structure ==
=== Leadership ===
The leader of Al-Nusra was Ahmed al-Sharaa. During his time as emir, he went by the name of Abu Mohammad Al-Julani, which implied that he is from the Golan Heights (al-Jawlan, in Arabic). Prior to the formation of Jabhat Al-Nusra, he was a senior member of Al-Qaeda in Iraq, heading operations in Nineveh Governorate. On 18 December 2013, he gave his first television interview, to Tayseer Allouni, a journalist originally from Syria, for Al Jazeera, and spoke classical Arabic with a Syrian accent.

Name	Position	Situation
Ahmed al-Sharaa	Emir	Founder and Emir of Al-Nusra Front
Sami al-Oraydi	Deputy Emir	Deputy leader and senior religious official in Al-Nusra Left the group after the formation of Tahrir Al-Sham.
Abu Maria Al-Qahtani	Emir of the Eastern area	Held the position of general religious authority and Emir of the Eastern area until 30 July 2014

=== Hierarchy ===
The structure of the group varied across Syria. In Damascus, the organisation operated in an underground clandestine cell system, while in Aleppo, the group was organised along semi-conventional military lines, with units divided into brigades, regiments, and platoons. All potential recruits were required to undertake a ten-day religious training course, followed by a 15–20-day military training program.

Al-Nusra contained a hierarchy of religious bodies, with a small Majlis-ash-Shura (Consultative Council) at the top, making national decisions on behalf of the group. Religious personnel also played an important role in the regional JN leadership, with each region having a commander and a sheikh. The sheikh supervised the commander from a religious perspective and is known as dabet Al-shar'i (religious commissioner).

=== Foreign fighters ===
A number of Americans have attempted to join the fighting in Syria, specifically with Al-Nusra. Sinh Vinh Ngo Nguyen, also known as Hasan Abu Omar Ghannoum, was arrested in California on 11 October 2013, on charges of attempting to travel to join Al-Qaeda, after reportedly having fought in Syria. As of November 2013, there had also been five additional publicly disclosed cases of Americans fighting in Syria, three of which were linked to Al-Nusra. In February 2015, charges of conspiracy to support terrorism were laid against six Bosnian-Americans who were alleged to have financially supported another Bosnian-American, the late Abdullah Ramo Pazara, who they alleged died fighting with Al-Nusra in 2014.

In September 2015 Nusra absorbed Imam Bukhari Jamaat, an Uzbek group which is a part of Al-Qaeda. Child soldiers were used by Katibat Imam Al-Bukhari. Al-Fu'ah and Kafriya were attacked by the group in September 2015. They also participated in the 2015 Jisr Al-Shughur offensive.

It was estimated that al-Nusra's fighting force was about 30% foreign fighters and 70% native Syrian fighters in July 2016.

=== Media ===
All statements and videos by Al-Nusra Front have been released by its media outlet, Al-Manarah Al-Bayda (Arabic: المنارة البيضاء) (The White Minaret), via the leading jihadist web-forum Shamoukh Al-Islam (Arabic: شموخ الإسلام).

== Relations with Al-Qaeda ==
In early 2015, there were reports that Qatar and other Gulf states were trying to get Al-Nusra to split away from Al-Qaeda, after which they would support Al-Nusra with money. Western observers and a Syrian observer considered such a split unlikely, and in March 2015, Al-Nusra's leadership denied a break-up or that talks with Qatar had occurred. Other Syrian observers considered such a split conceivable or imminent.

With members of Al-Qaeda still enmeshed throughout the group's leadership, it can be considered that Al-Qaeda was not "external" to the group. After the announcement, numerous senior Al-Qaeda members still within the group were targeted by the United States in airstrikes. The group's leader Ahmed al-Sharaa, in his first recorded video message, stated its new name would be Jabhat Fatah Al-Sham ("Front for the Conquest of the Levant"). During the renaming announcement in July 2016, Al-Julani thanked Al-Qaeda leaders Ayman Al-Zawahiri and Abu Khayr Al-Masri. Ahmad Salama Mabruk, an associate of Al-Zawahiri, sat alongside Al-Julani during the announcement.

Despite the group re-branding and announcing no external affiliations, the United States Central Command continued to consider it to be a branch of Al-Qaeda and "an organization to be concerned about". Al Jazeera journalist Sharif Nashashibi noted that immediately after the rebranding, both the US and Russia called it "cosmetic" and promised that air strikes would continue" against Al-Nusra. Journalist Robin Wright described the rebranding as a "jihadi shell game" and "expedient fiction"—a tactic known as "marbling" by jihadi groups—and that as of December 2016 Al-Qaeda had embedded "two dozen senior personnel" in the group.

Writing shortly after the rebranding, Nashashibi argued that it might help generate more "regional support", which the group needed in the face of Syrian government and Russian military success. Wright wrote that the move was effective with many conservative Sunnis in the region, and that hundreds of them joined its ranks since the rebranding, believing the group to be "less extreme" than the rival Islamic State.

=== Al-Qaeda and Khorasan group ===
Khorasan, also known as the Khorasan Group, is an alleged group of senior Al-Qaeda members who operate in Syria. The group has been reported to consist of a small number of fighters who are all on terrorist watchlists, and to co-ordinate with Al-Nusra Front. Al-Nusra Front leader Ahmed Al-Sharaa denied the existence of this alleged "Khorasan group" in an interview with Al Jazeera on 28 May 2015.

== History ==
=== Origin ===
In August 2011, upon the outbreak of the Syrian Civil War, the leader of Al-Qaeda in Iraq (also known as the Islamic State of Iraq), Abu Bakr Al-Baghdadi, and Al-Qaeda's central command authorized the Syrian Al-Qaeda member Ahmed al-Sharaa to set up an offshoot of al Qaeda in Syria, to bring down the Assad government and establish an Islamic state there. Al-Julani and six colleagues crossed the border from Iraq into Syria, and reached out to Islamists released from Syria's Sednaya military prison in May–June 2011 who were already active in fighting against Assad's security forces. The six men who founded Jabhat Al-Nusra alongside Al-Julani were Saleh Al-Hamawi (Syrian), Abu Maria Al-Qahtani (Iraqi), Mustafa Abd Al-Latif Al-Saleh (kunya: Abu Anas Al-Sahaba) (Jordanian/Palestinian), Iyad Tubasi (kunya: Abu Julaybib) (Jordanian/Palestinian), Abu Omar Al-Filistini (Palestinian) and Anas Khattab (Syrian).

A number of meetings were held between October 2011 and January 2012 in Rif Dimashq and Homs, where the objectives of the group were determined. Al-Julani's group formally announced itself under the name "Jabhat Al-Nusra l'Ahl as-Sham" (Support Front for the People of the Sham) on 23 January 2012.

Iraq's deputy interior minister said in early February 2012 that weapons and Islamist militants were entering Syria from Iraq. The Quilliam Foundation reported that many of Nusra's members were Syrians who were part of Abu Musab Al-Zarqawi's Islamist network fighting the 2003 American invasion in Iraq; Iraqi Foreign Minister Hoshyar Zebari agreed to that in 2012. The British The Daily Telegraph stated in December 2012 that many foreign Al-Nusra fighters were hardened veterans from conflicts in Iraq and Afghanistan.

=== Strength in 2012 ===
By the second half of 2012, Jabhat Al-Nusra stood out among the array of armed groups emerging in Syria as a disciplined and effective fighting force. Nusra in October 2012 refused a call for a four-day ceasefire in Syria during Eid Al-Adha feast.

In November 2012, they were considered by The Huffington Post to be the best-trained and most experienced fighters among the Syrian rebels. According to spokesmen of a moderate wing of the Free Syrian Army (FSA), Nusra had in November 2012 between 6,000 and 10,000 fighters, accounting for 7–9% of the FSA's total fighters. Commentator David Ignatius for The Washington Post described Nusra then as the most aggressive and successful arm of the FSA. The United States Department of State stated likewise: "From the reports we get from the doctors, most of the injured and dead FSA are Jabhat Al-Nusra, due to their courage and [the fact they are] always at the front line".

On 10 December 2012, the U.S. designated Nusra a foreign terrorist organization and an alias of Al-Qaeda in Iraq. That decision made it illegal for Americans to deal financially with Nusra. Days earlier, the American ambassador to Syria, R. Ford, had said: "Extremist groups like Jabhat Al-Nusra are a problem, an obstacle to finding the political solution that Syria's going to need".

=== Relations with other Syrian rebels in 2012 ===
Al-Nusra Front fighters during the Syrian Civil War.

In August 2012, there were signs of Nusra cooperating with other rebels. The group took part in military operations with the Free Syrian Army (FSA). Abu Haidar, a Syrian FSA coordinator in Aleppo's Saif Al-Dawla district said that Al-Nusra Front "have experienced fighters who are like the revolution's elite commando troops."

In October–December 2012 Nusra received words of praise and appreciation for their efforts in the "revolution" against Assad from non-specified 'rebels', an FSA spokesman in the Aleppo region, a group of 29 civilian and military groups, and the leader of the Syrian National Coalition. At the same time, two anonymous FSA leaders, and a secular rebel in north Syria, expressed disapproval of the Islamist 'religious prison' Nusra might be wanting to turn Syria into.

=== Attacks by al-Nusra (2012–2013) ===
The 6 January 2012 Al-Midan bombing was claimed by Al-Nusra, in a video seen by AFP on 29 February 2012. It was allegedly carried out by Abu Al-Baraa Al-Shami. Footage of the destruction caused by the blast was released on a jihadist forum. An Al-Nusra-affiliated group announced the formation of the "Free Ones of the Levant Battalions", in a YouTube video statement that was released on 23 January 2012. In the statement, the group claimed that it attacked the headquarters of security in Idlib province. "To all the free people of Syria, we announce the formation of the Free Ones of the Levant Battalions," the statement said, according to a translation obtained by The Long War Journal. "We promise Allah, and then we promise you, that we will be a firm shield and a striking hand to repel the attacks of this criminal Al Assad army with all the might we can muster. We promise to protect the lives of civilians and their possessions from the security and Shabiha militias. We are a people who will either gain victory or die."

The March 2012 Damascus bombings were claimed by Al-Nusra.

The 10 May 2012 Damascus bombings were allegedly claimed by Al-Nusra Front in an Internet video; however, on 15 May 2012, someone claiming to be a spokesman for the group denied that the organisation was responsible for the attack, saying that it would only release information through jihadist forums.

On 29 May 2012, a mass execution was discovered near the eastern city of Deir ez-Zor. The unidentified corpses of 13 men had been discovered shot to death execution-style. On 5 June 2012, Al-Nusra Front claimed responsibility for the killings, stating that they had captured and interrogated the soldiers in Deir ez-Zor and "justly" punished them with death, after they confessed to committing crimes.

On 17 June 2012, Walid Ahmad Al-Ayesh, described by Syrian authorities as the "right hand" of Al-Nusra Front, was killed when Syrian authorities discovered his hiding place. He was reportedly responsible for the making of car bombs that were used to attack Damascus in the previous months. The Syrian authorities reported the killing of another prominent member of the group, Wael Mohammad Al-Majdalawi, killed on 12 August 2012 in an operation conducted in Damascus.

On 27 June 2012, a group of Syrian rebels attacked a pro-government TV station in the town of Drousha, just south of the capital Damascus. The station's studios were destroyed with explosives. Seven people were killed in the attack on Al-Ikhbariya TV, including four guards and three journalists. Al-Nusra claimed responsibility for the attack and published photos of 11 station employees they kidnapped following the raid.

The murder in July 2012 of journalist Mohammed Al-Saeed, a well-known government TV news presenter, was claimed by Nusra in a video released on 3 or 4 August, according to Syrian Observatory for Human Rights.

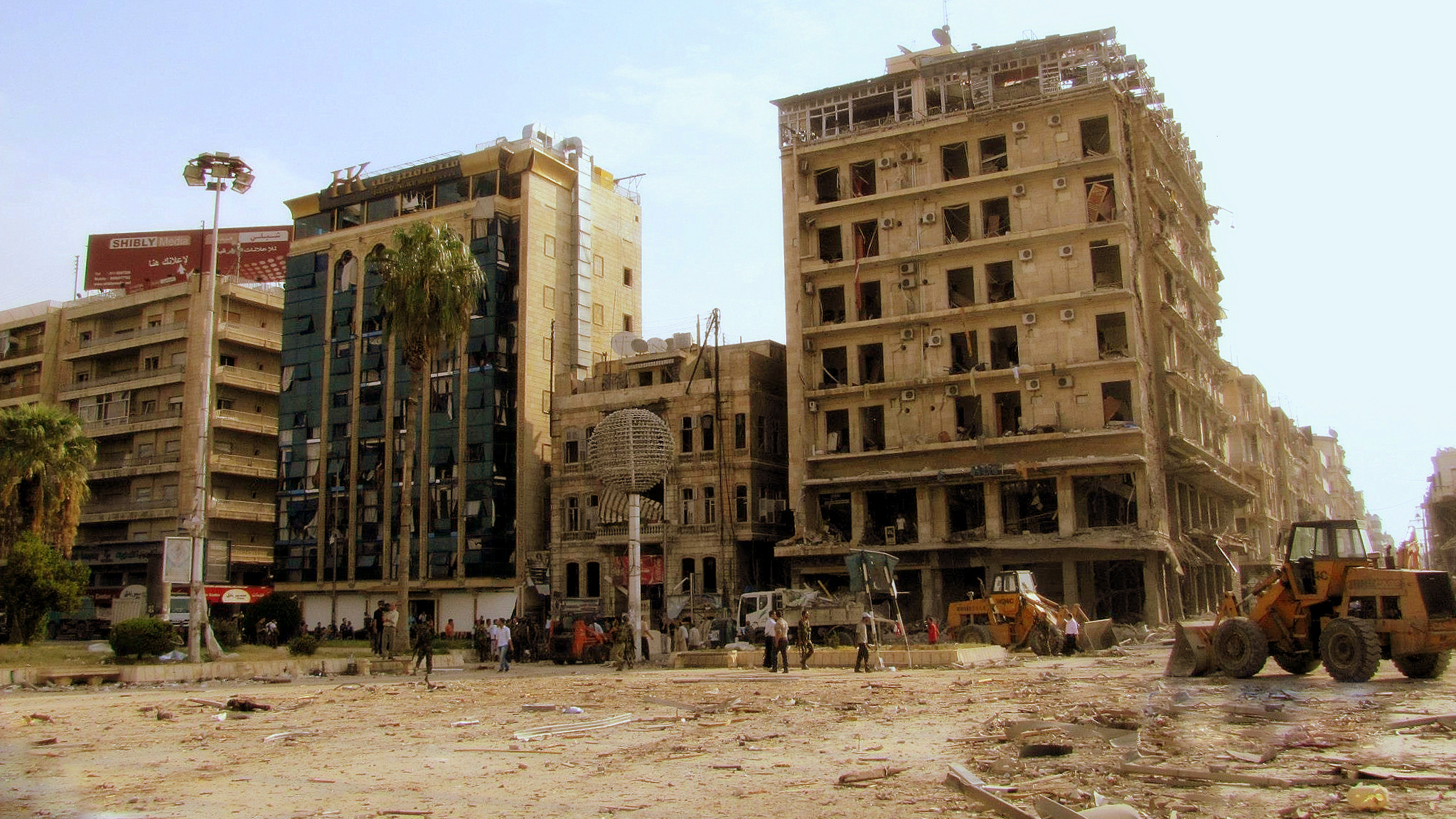
The scene at Saadallah Al-Jabiri Square after the attacks on 3 October 2012

The 3 October 2012 Aleppo bombings were claimed by Al-Nusra. Three suicide car bombs exploded at the eastern corner of the central Saadallah Al-Jabiri Square killing 48 people. More than 122 people were reported to be heavily injured. The bombs targeted the Officers' club and the nearby buildings of the Touristic Hotel and the historic "Jouha Café". The hotel received major damage while the café was entirely destroyed. A small building within the Officers' club was ruined as well.

Al-Nusra Front also claimed responsibility for attacking numerous Syrian military bases, including:

- Aleppo district: an air defence base, on: 12 October 2012
- Aleppo city: the Hanano barracks
- Raqqah: the Suluq barracks

In the air defence base assault they reportedly destroyed buildings and sabotaged radar and rockets after over-running the base in co-operation with Al-Fajr Islamic Movement and a group of Chechen fighters. During the storming of the Hanano barracks 11 soldiers were killed and they held the complex for six hours before retreating. They also claimed killing 32 soldiers during the raid on the Raqqah base.

In October 2012, they joined other rebels in an attack on the Wadi Deif base around Maraat al Numan, in a prolonged fighting that turned into a siege of the base. They also led an attack on the Taftanaz Air Base in November 2012, an important and strategic base for the Syrian army, containing up to 48 helicopters.

The group seized three army checkpoints around Saraqeb at the end of October 2012, forcing the Syrian Army to withdraw from the area the next day. In the battle, 28 Syrian soldiers were killed as well as five Nusra fighters. Some of the captured soldiers were summarily executed after being called "Assad dogs". The video of these executions was widely condemned, with the United Nations referring to them as probable war crimes.

Al-Nusra Front carried out two suicide attacks in early November 2012. One occurred in a rural development center in Sahl Al-Ghab in Hama province, where a car bomb killed two people; while the other occurred in the Mezzeh neighbourhood of Damascus, where a suicide bomber killed 11 people. The SOHR claimed a total of 50 soldiers were killed in the Sahl Al-Ghab attack.

Al Jazeera reported on 23 December 2012 that Al-Nusra Front had declared a "no-fly-zone" over Aleppo, using 23 mm and 57 mm anti-aircraft guns to down planes. This would include commercial flights which Al-Nusra believed transported military equipment and troops. In a video sent to Al Jazeera, they warned civilians against boarding commercial flights.

In February 2013, Al Nusra fighters were involved in fighting in Safira with government reinforcements, preventing these forces from reaching their destination of the city of Aleppo. A monitoring group claims this resulted in more than two hundred casualties over a period of two weeks.

Though it was initially reported that Syrian Catholic priest François Murad was beheaded by Nusra at a church in Gassanieh in June 2013, he was actually shot dead.

As of June 2013, Al-Nusra Front had claimed responsibility for 57 of the 70 suicide attacks in Syria during the conflict.

In December 2013, Al-Nusra abducted 13 nuns from a Christian monastery in Maaloula. They were held in the town of Yabroud until 9 March 2014, The nuns reported they had not been harassed and could keep religious symbols.

=== Dispute with ISIL (2013) ===
By January 2013, Nusra was a formidable force alleged to have strong popular support in Syria, and it continued to grow in strength during the following months. In January 2013, the Quilliam counter-extremism thinktank estimated its membership at 5,000 fighters with 2,000 trainees. In May 2013, analysts Ken Sofer and Juliana Shafroth estimated 6,000 foreign and domestic fighters. By July, The Economist estimated its strength at 7,000 fighters. Other size estimates, however, were more conservative; a report in the Turkish daily Hurriyet in March 2013 said that the group had increased its membership from around 300–400 jihadists to 1,000 as Syrian fighters in Iraq have returned to their country in the wake of the US designation of Al-Nusra as a terrorist organisation.

On 8 April 2013, the leader of the Islamic State of Iraq (ISI), Abu Bakr Al-Baghdadi, released a recorded audio message on the Internet, in which he announced that Jabhat Al-Nusra was part of his network, and that he was merging Jabhat Al-Nusra with ISI into one group, "Islamic State of Iraq and Al-Sham" (ISIL), under his command. Al-Baghdadi also claimed that Ahmed al-Sharaa had been dispatched by ISI to Syria to meet with pre-existing cells in the country and that ISI had provided Jabhat Al-Nusra with the plans and strategy needed for the Syrian Civil War, and had been funding their activities.

The next day Al-Julani rejected the proposed merger and affirmed the group's allegiance to Al-Qaeda and its leader, Ayman Al-Zawahiri. Al-Julani was quoted as saying, "We inform you that neither the Al-Nusra command nor its consultative council, nor its general manager were aware of this announcement. It reached them via the media and if the speech is authentic, we were not consulted." Nusra then split, with some members, particularly foreign fighters, following Baghdadi's edict and joining ISIL, while others stayed loyal to Al-Julani or left to join other Islamist brigades.

In May 2013, Reuters reported that Al-Baghdadi had travelled from Iraq to Syria's Aleppo Governorate province and begun recruiting members of Al-Nusra. In June 2013, Al Jazeera reported that it had obtained a letter written by Al-Qaeda leader Ayman Al-Zawahiri, addressed to both Abu Bakr Al-Baghdadi and Ahmed Al-Sharaa, in which he ruled against the merger of the two organisations and appointed an emissary to oversee relations between them and put an end to tensions. Later in the month, an audio message from Al-Baghdadi was released in which he rejected Al-Zawahiri's ruling and declared that the merger of the two organisations into the Islamic State was going ahead. This sequence of events caused much confusion and division amongst members of Al-Nusra.

In November 2013, Al-Zawahiri ordered the disbandment of ISIL and said Al-Nusra should be considered the (only) Al-Qaeda branch in Syria, and bestowed the title "Tanzim Qa'edat Al-Jihad fi Bilad Al-Sham" ("the Qae'dat Al-Jihad organization in the Levant") on them, officially integrating Nusra into Al-Qaeda's global network.

=== Open fighting between al-Nusra and ISIL (2013–2015) ===
Some units of Al-Nusra began taking part in clashes against the Islamic State in late 2013. In September of that year, as part of their takeover of the city of Raqqa from rival rebel groups, ISIL assassinated the Al-Nusra Front-appointed governor of Raqqa, Mohammed Saeed Al-Abdullah (also known as Abu Sa'ad Al-Hadrami), who had opposed the merger with ISIS and had stayed loyal to Abu Mohammad al-Julani.

In February 2014, after efforts to end the dispute between ISIL and Nusra had failed, Al-Qaeda formally dissociated itself from its onetime affiliate ISIL, leaving Jabhat Al-Nusra the sole representative of Al-Qaeda in Syria. In the same month, Al-Julani threatened to go to war with ISIL over their suspected role in the killing of senior Ahrar Al-Sham commander Abu Khaled Al-Souri. Al-Julani gave ISIL five days to submit evidence that they were innocent of the attack to three imprisoned Jihadist clerics, Abu Muhammad Al-Maqdisi, Abu Qatada Al-Falastini, and Suleiman Al-Alwan. On 16 April 2014, ISIL killed Al-Nusra's Idlib chief Abu Mohammad Al-Ansari together with his family, the Syrian Observatory for Human Rights reported. In May 2014, open fighting broke out between ISIL and Al-Nusra in Deir ez-Zor Governorate, leaving hundreds dead on both sides.

By July 2014, Al-Nusra had largely been expelled from Deir ez-Zor Governorate. Also in July, an audio recording attributed to Al-Julani appeared online, in which he said that Al-Nusra planned to establish an Islamic emirate in the areas of Syria where they had a presence. A statement issued on 12 July 2014 by Al-Nusra's media channel affirmed the authenticity of the recording, but stated that they had not yet declared the establishment of an emirate.

In June 2015, Al-Julani stated in regard to ISIL: "There is no solution between us and them in the meantime, or in the foreseeable future [...] We hope they repent to God and return to their senses ... if not, then there is nothing but fighting between us."

=== Attacks by al-Nusra (2014–2015) ===
On 28 August 2014, militants from the group kidnapped 45 UN peacekeepers from Fiji from Golan Heights in the United Nations Disengagement Observer Force Zone. The group demanded that it be removed from the UN's list of terrorist organisations in exchange for the lives of the peacekeepers. In addition to UN personnel, the group routinely captured UN vehicles to use as car bombs. At the same time, two groups of UN peacekeepers from Philippines were trapped under fire in nearby Rwihinah. On 31 August, one group of 32 Filipino soldiers was rescued and the other group of 40 soldiers escaped. The rescue operation was carried out by Irish peacekeepers. Colonel Ezra Enriquez of the Philippines, who oversaw the operations, resigned over disagreements with Indian Lieutenant General Iqbal Singh Singha. Singha had allegedly ordered the Filipinos peacekeepers to surrender arms to ensure the safe release of the Fijian soldiers. On 8 September, Rodrigo Duterte, the mayor of Davao City, called for Singha's death after he allegedly called the Filipino soldiers cowards. On 11 September, the kidnapped Fijian soldiers were released.

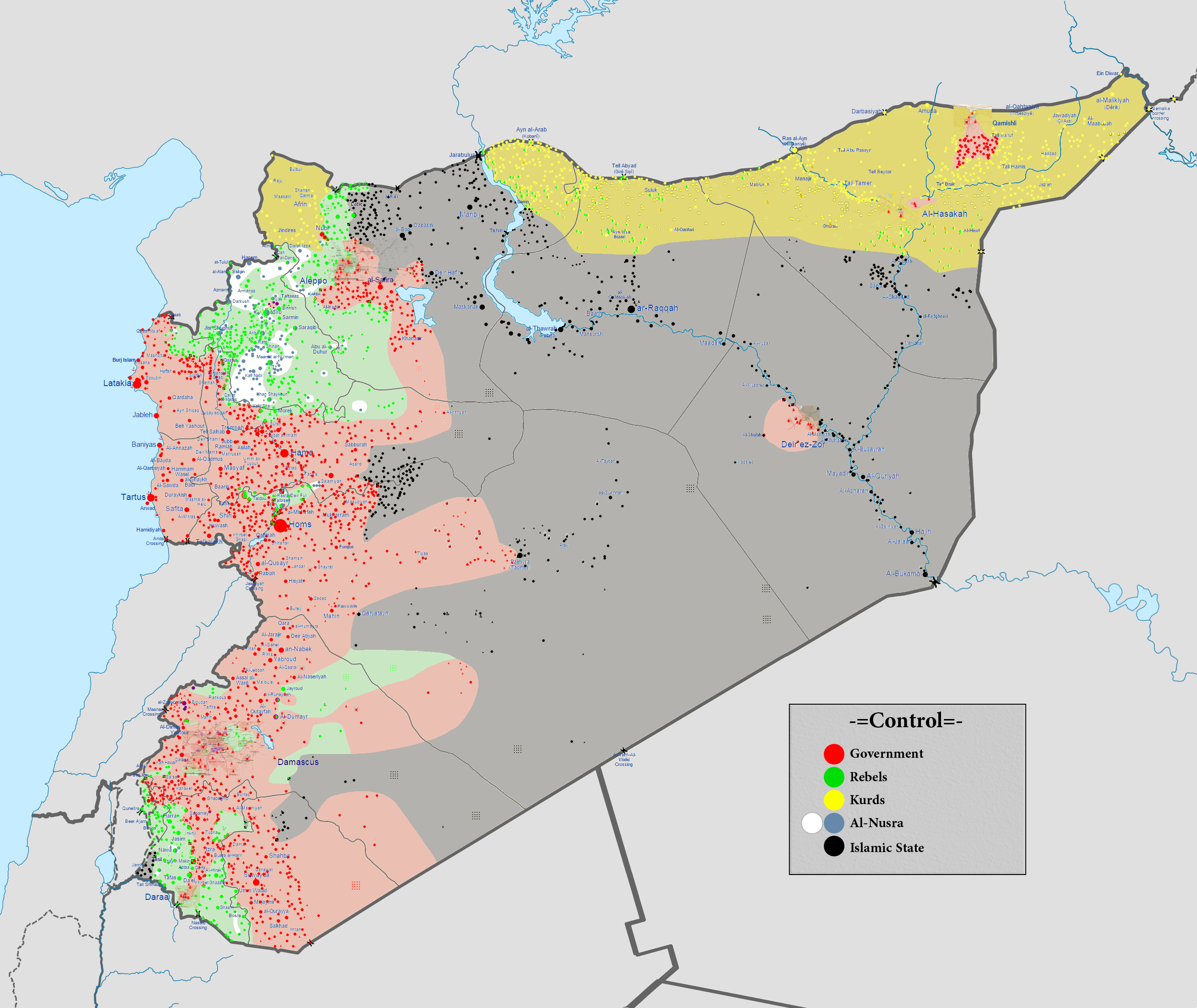
Military situation in December 2015

In late October 2014, Al-Nusra began attacking some FSA and moderate Islamist groups that it was formerly allied with, reportedly in a bid to eventually establish its own Islamic state in the cities it controlled in Idlib Governorate and other neighbouring Governorates.

In June 2015, fighters of Al-Nusra massacred 20 Druze villagers in Idlib province located in north-west Syria. Al Jazeera claimed that Al-Nusra's leadership apologized and blamed the incident on a few undisciplined fighters.

In October 2015, Al-Nusra offered bounties worth millions of dollars for the killing of Syrian President Bashar al-Assad and Hezbollah leader Hassan Nasrallah. Al-Julani said he would pay "three million euros ($3.4 million) for anyone who can kill Bashar Al-Assad and end his story".

In December 2015, two Army of Revolutionaries fighters were beheaded by al-Nusra, according to sources on social media. In December 2015, al-Nusra fighters celebrated the ransoming and exchange of Lebanese army prisoners in the town of Arsal in Lebanon, according to sources on social media.

=== Relations with other Syrian rebels in 2015–2016 ===
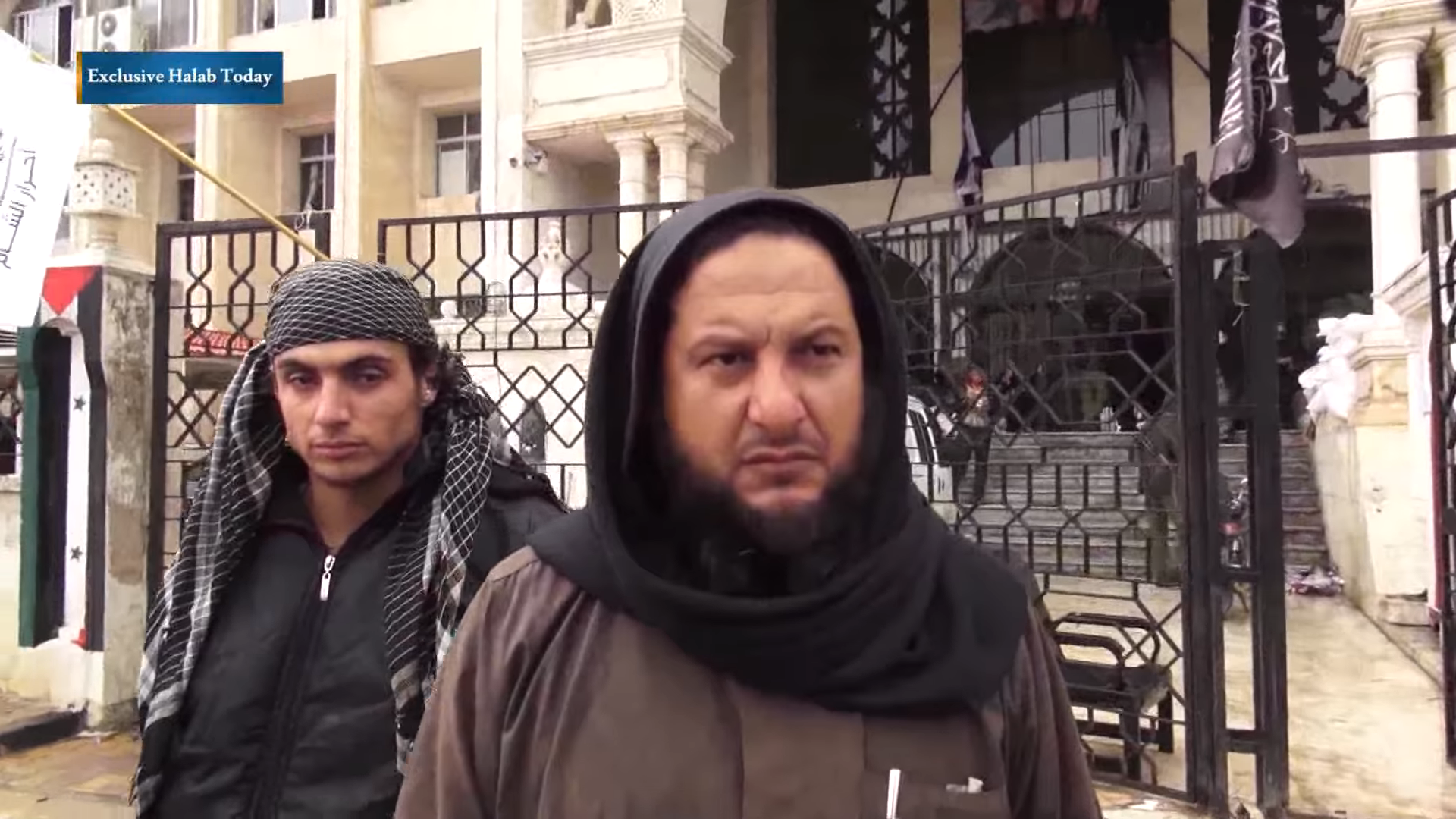
An Al-Nusra field commander outside a building jointly occupied by Al-Nusra and Ahrar Al-Sham in the city of Idlib, 30 March 2015

In 2015, rebel factions in southern Syria vowed to distance themselves from the 'extremists' of Al-Nusra in April 2015, but were seen cooperating with them in Daraa only days later. In May 2015, Al-Nusra was estimated to have 10,000 fighters in Southern Syria, far fewer than the Free Syrian Army, but with superior weaponry on which the FSA depended in joint operations against the government.

During successful Syrian opposition offensives in the northern Idlib Governorate from March until May 2015 (see also March–April offensive and April–June 2015 offensive), Al-Nusra effectively coordinated its operations with the FSA, moderate and conservative Syrian Islamists, and some independent jihadist factions.

On 17 February 2016, nearly half of Jund Al-Aqsa, numbering 400 fighters, joined Al-Nusra. Five days later, two Damascus-based jihadist groups swore allegiance to Al-Nusra. On 25 February, Al-Nusra Front withdrew from the town of Sarmada, near the Turkish border in the Idlib Province, in an attempt to prevent Russian warplanes from bombing the town after the implementation of the Syria ceasefire.

Jaysh Al-Islam leader Zahran Alloush addressed Jabhat Al-Nusra as "our brothers", saying that "The summary of this issue is that we in Jaish Al-Islam praise our brothers of the Nusra Front and we don't consider them Khawarij as is propagated against us, We fight alongside them and they fight alongside us".

According to the BBC in 2016, "Jabhat Fatah Al-Sham has a complex relationship with the more moderate Free Syrian Army (FSA), which is itself an alliance of allied groups, some of which were more willing to co-operate with Nusra than others."

=== Russian air raids (2015–2016) ===
Russia sees Al-Nusra as a terrorist organization. Russian air strikes reportedly targeted positions held by Al-Nusra from September 2015 and Al-Nusra set a reward for the seizure of Russian soldiers.

In October 2015 Al-Nusra militant Abu Ubaid Al-Madani, who speaks Russian, released a video addressed to the Russians warning that they would massacre Russian soldiers. Ahmed al-Sharaa called for Russian civilians to be attacked by former Soviet Muslims and called for attacks on Alawite villages in Syria. In November 2015, Al-Nusra fighters and Turkish-supported Syrian Turkmen Brigades were engaged in heavy fighting in Syria's northwestern Latakia Governorate against the Syrian government forces supported by the Shiite militias and the Russian air force.

=== Speculations on a split with Al-Qaeda (2015–2016) ===
On 29 July 2016 Al-Nusra leader Abu Mohammad al-Julani announced the group changed its name to Jabhat Fatah al-Sham and had "no affiliation to any external entity". While some analysts have interpreted this to mean breaking away from Al-Qaeda, the group and association with it were not specifically mentioned in the announcement, nor has it been said that Al-Nusra's oath of allegiance to Ayman Al-Zawahiri have been renounced. According to Sharif Nashashibi of Al Jazeera, Al-Qaeda had "given the split its blessing", and the separation "meant no change in the group's ideology". With numerous senior members of Al-Qaeda enmeshed within Al-Nusra, it can be considered that Al-Qaeda are not "external" to the group. To this extent, other analysts say that the announcement was cosmetic, a ruse to obfuscate their continued association and membership within Al-Qaeda. In the time after the announcement, a number of senior Al-Qaeda members were killed by US air strikes, while operating within Al-Nusra.

For over a year prior to this there had been speculation that the group would separate from Al-Qaeda and about what it would mean.

On 12 February 2015, SITE Intelligence Group cited rumours that al-Nusra leader Al-Julani had plans to disassociate from Al-Qaeda. On 4 March 2015, Reuters reported that "sources within and close to Al-Nusra" said that in the past months Qatar and other Gulf states had encouraged al-Nusra leader Ahmed Al-Sharaa to abandon Al-Qaeda, promising funding to al-Nusra once that break-up was carried out. An official close to the Qatari government had confirmed to Reuters that Qatar wanted al-Nusra to become purely Syrian and disconnect from Al-Qaeda, after which Qatar would start to support al-Nusra with money and supplies. Muzamjer Al-Sham, reportedly a 'prominent jihadi close to al-Nusra had said that al-Nusra would soon merge with Jaish Al-Muhajireen wal-Ansar and other small jihadi brigades and disengage from Al-Qaeda, but that not all al-Nusra emirs had yet agreed to that. On 9 March 2015, in a statement issued on Twitter, Al-Nusra denied "completely all reports of a meeting with Qatar" and reports of a break-up with Al-Qaeda. Expert Thomas Pierret at the University of Edinburgh assumed that Qatar was trying to force the hand of Al-Nusra with this "leak" about a split and said a break with Al-Qaeda was very unlikely. French expert on jihadism Romain Caillet agreed: "The overwhelming majority of Al-Nusra members want to stay in Al-Qaeda, particularly foreign fighters who represent at least one-third of the organisation".

But in May 2015 Abu Maria Al-Qahtani, the commander of Al-Nusra in Deir ez-Zor province, still strongly advocated a split with Al-Qaeda. Muhamed Nabih Osman, leading a charitable organisation for former Assad prisoners, said to website The Daily Beast on 4 May 2015: "I think it will happen soon. You have to understand that Al-Nusra consists of two very different parts and that one part, mostly local fighters, are not interested in global jihad".

On 7 May 2015, a Turkish official said that Turkey and Saudi Arabia were bolstering Ahrar Al-Sham at al-Nusra's expense, hoping that Al-Sham's rise puts pressure on al-Nusra to renounce its ties to Al-Qaeda and open itself to outside help.

A "well-connected Syrian Islamist" cited in May 2015 by Charles Lister in The Huffington Post said: "There are now two main currents...the conservatives are keen on keeping ties to Al-Qaeda and the others are more inclined towards the new Syria-focused approach". Another "Islamist official from Damascus" is cited: "al-Nusra's disengagement from al Qaeda would be good for the revolution, but Jabhat Al-Nusra will always be in dire need of al Qaeda's name to keep its foreign fighters away from IS. Most Jabhat foreign fighters will never accept to fight and die for what looks like an Islamic national project."

In late July 2016, through various sources, the Middle East Eye claimed that an organizational split from Al-Qaeda is "imminent", with the proposal reportedly been approved by AQ leaders and proposed a new name called "Jabhat Fatah Al-Sham", or the "Conquest of the Levant Front". However, the sources claimed that the move would not affect Al-Nusra's Al-Qaeda ideology and its plan to commit attacks on the West.

The organisation grew in early 2016. Charles Lister reported that "According to three Islamist sources based in the area, Jabhat Al-Nusra successfully recruited at least 3,000 Syrians into its ranks between February and June 2016." In mid-2016, reports suggested it was composed of around 5,000 to 10,000 fighters, with the Russian ministry of defence estimating 7,000 fighters in Idlib province.

=== As Jabhat Fatah Al-Sham (July 2016 – January 2017) ===
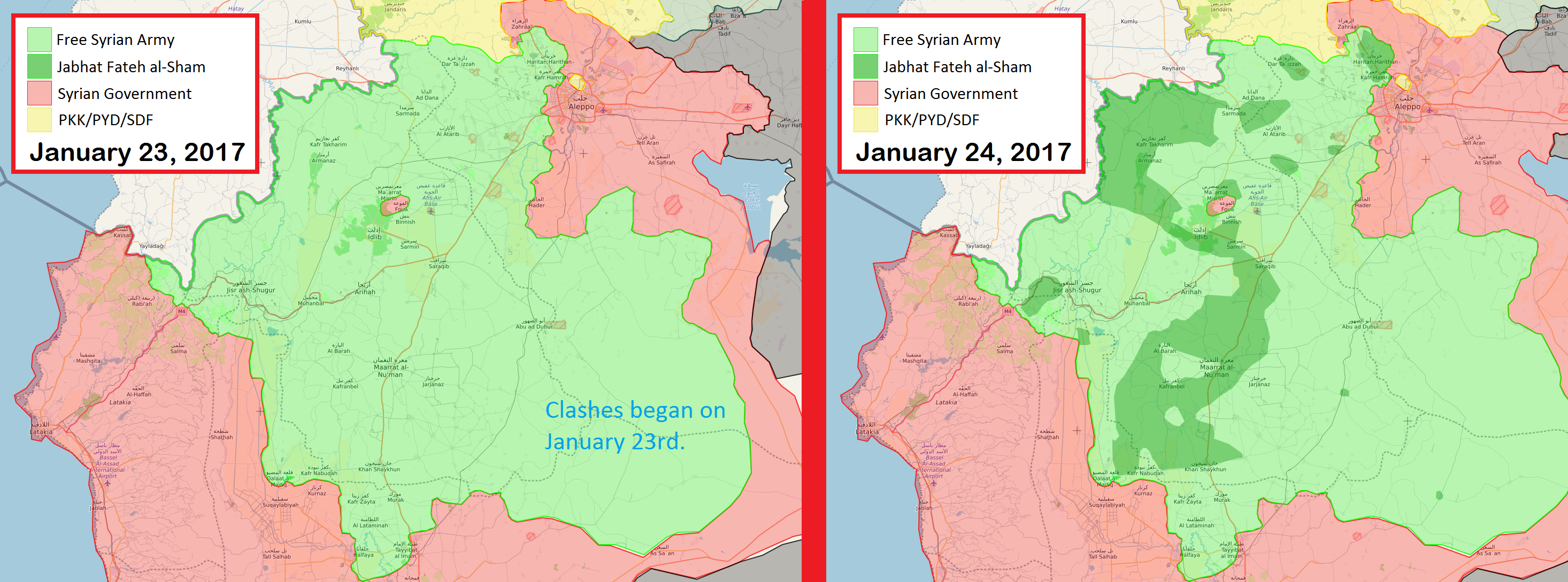
Idlib Governorate clashes in January–March 2017

In August 2016, the BBC estimated Jabhat Fatah Al-Sham as having 5,000–10,000 fighters, all Syrian. Lister gave a figure of 10,000. In a public statement issued by its spokesperson, JFS announced that it was officially splitting from Al-Qaeda:

[Before this change, Jabhat Al-Nusra] was an official branch of Al-Qaeda. We reported to their central command, and we worked within their framework; we adhered to their policies. With the formation of JFS, we are completely independent. That means we don't report to anyone, we don't receive directives from any external entity. If dissolving external organizational affiliations or ties will remove the obstacles in the way of unity, then this must be done. When we were part of Al-Qaeda ... our core policy was to focus all of our efforts on the Syrian issue. That was our policy before and it will be our policy today and tomorrow.

In July Jabhat Fatah Al-Sham kidnapped the American journalist Lindsey Snell in northern Syria. She escaped to Turkey's Hatay Province in August and was subsequently arrested by Turkish authorities for being in a military exclusion zone and imprisoned. The mid-2016 rebel offensive in Aleppo was carried out by Jabhat Fatah Al-Sham alongside the Turkistan Islamic Party and Ahrar Al-Sham. On 31 August, Hezbollah attacked a JFS outpost in the Qalamoun Mountains near the city of Arsal, Lebanon, on the Lebanon–Syria border, killing a number of their fighters.

On 8 September an airstrike of unknown origin killed the top JFS military commander, Abu Hajer Al-Homsi (nom de guerre Abu Omar Saraqeb), among several other Army of Conquest commanders in the countryside of the Aleppo Governorate, the rebels accused the United States of conducting the strike, but this was denied by the Pentagon and subsequently Russia took responsibility. On 3 October, Ahmad Salama Mabruk, an Egyptian JFS and Al-Qaeda commander, was killed by a US airstrike against his vehicle in Jisr Al-Shughur.

On 9 October, Jund Al-Aqsa, after infighting between them and numerous rebel groups including Ahrar Al-Sham, merged with JFS. In early October, according to pro-government Al-Masdar News, a number of Mountain Hawks Brigade fighters defected to join Jabhat Fatah Al-Sham due to several disagreements, mainly due to the established of the Free Idlib Army. On 25 January 2017, according to rebel social media, they returned, along with their leader Lt. Col. Nasha'at Haj Ahmad to the Mountain Hawks Brigade.

Military situation in Syria as of February 2026: Controlled by Syrian transitional government (includes TAF) Controlled by Kurdish groups (SDF) Controlled by local Druze factions Controlled by Israeli Defense Forces Controlled by Assadist insurgents Controlled by the Islamic State (IS); (For a more detailed, interactive map, see Template:Syrian Civil War detailed map.)

As of late 2016, Al-Nusra mainly controlled territory throughout Idlib Governorate, alongside other factions in the Army of Conquest. It also held some areas in the Quneitra Governorate.

On 1 January 2017, a US drone strike killed Abu Omar Al-Turkistani, a senior Al-Qaeda member and Jabhat Fatah Al-Sham military commander, along with three other JFS members near the town of Sarmada in the northern Idlib Governorate. The next day, more than 25 JFS members were killed in an air raid by suspected US planes. The Tora Bora battle saw Turkistani's participation. The Islamic Jihad Union enlisted Turkistani as a member. Jabhat Fath al Sham included Turkistani. SOHR identified Al-Turkestani from among the dead. Before dying in Syria, Al-Turkistani was in the Afghanistan war. He was also the emir for the Al-Qaeda-affiliated Ansar Jihad in Central Asia. Europeans make up an amount while Central Asians make up the majority of foreigners in the Afghanistan-based Islamic Jihad Union which is allied to Al-Qaeda.

On 19 January 2017, US airstrikes by Boeing B-52 Stratofortress strategic bombers struck the former Syrian Army Sheikh Suleiman military base in western Aleppo, which was used by Jabhat Fatah Al-Sham and the Nour Al-Din Al-Zenki Movement, killing at least 110 Al-Qaeda fighters, including Abu Hasan Al-Taftanaz, an Al-Qaeda senior leader, along with some Al-Zenki fighters. Since 1 January 2017, more than 150 AQ members were killed by US airstrikes in 2017. Condolences were issued to Jabhat Fatah Al-Sham over the killings, by the Uyghur jihadist Turkistan Islamic Party. The training camp had been operated by Al-Nusra Front and Al-Zenki since 2013. Outrage over the lack of condolences from other factions over an American bombing and killing of 100+ JFS members was voiced by Muhaysini.

On 21 January 2017, five factions from Ahrar Al-Sham left to join the Al-Nusra Front;- Jaish Al-Ahrar, Al-Bara, Dhu Nurayn, Al-Sawa'iq and Usud Al-Har Battalion, according to social media sources. On the same day, 2 Al-Nusra Shura Council members based in Aleppo announced that they left the group. Ahrar Al-Sham, the Suqour Al-Sham Brigade, Jabhat Ahl Al-Sham, Jaysh Al-Islam and Fastaqim Union then established a joint operations room to combat Al-Nusra and its subfaction Jund Al-Aqsa.

Abu Umar Saraqib and Abu Faraj's deaths received condolences from the Turkistan Islamic Party.

=== Formation of Tahrir Al-Sham (January 2017) ===
On 28 January 2017, several Salafi jihadist groups, including Jabhat Fatah Al-Sham, agreed upon a merger agreement, resulting in the formation of a new group called Hay'at Tahrir Al-Sham ("Organization for the Liberation of the Levant"). With Jabhat Fatah Al-Sham being one of the most powerful/influential groups in the new formation, its leader Ahmed al-Sharaa was appointed the high-level position of overall military commander of the new group. The only other position of equal or greater authority in the new group is the Emir, to which role was appointed Abu Jaber Sheikh, who defected from Ahrar Al-Sham to join this new group.

== External support ==
At least one Arab government accused Qatar of helping Al-Nusra. In October 2014, U.S. Vice President Joe Biden said that Turkey, Saudi Arabia, and the United Arab Emirates had "poured hundreds of millions of dollars and tens of thousands of tons of weapons into anyone who would fight against Al-Assad, except that the people who were being supplied were Al-Nusra, and al Qaeda, and the extremist elements of jihadis coming from other parts of the world." In 2015, The Independent reported that Saudi Arabia and Turkey were "focusing their backing for the Syrian rebels on the combined Jaish Al-Fatah, or the Army of Conquest, a command structure for jihadist groups in Syria that [included] Jabhat Al-Nusra."

Al-Nusra was also materially supported by multiple foreign fighters. Most of these fighters were from Europe and the Middle East, as pipelines to Syria from those locations are better established and navigable. However, as of November 2013, there were also 6 publicly disclosed cases of American citizens and permanent residents who joined or attempted to join Al-Nusra in 2013 alone.

The US government sent weapons to rebels in Syria from at least late 2013, and perhaps as early as 2012, during the beginning phases of the conflict (CIA's covert program Timber Sycamore). Some of these weapons reportedly fell into the hands of Al-Nusra. Weapons have been passed on to Nusra by Ahrar ash-Sham according to a Nusra member and rebels. The Pentagon confirmed in September 2015 that a small group of US-trained New Syrian Forces rebels gave six pickup trucks and a portion of their ammunition to Al-Nusra Front in exchange for safe passage.

There were cases of Al-Nusra combatants receiving medical aid in Israel and returning to fight. Former head of Mossad, Efraim Halevy, in an interview for Al Jazeera implicitly confirmed that such practices had taken place, as part of a general Israeli policy of treating wounded rebel fighters on the border. Israel, however, denies formal ties of any sort between itself and Al-Nusra. Russian-Israeli journalist Elizabeth Tsurkov said that Nusra refused to cooperate with Israel, claiming that they kidnapped and assasinated suspected collaborators.

=== Qatari involvement ===
The Emir of Qatar publicly admitted, in an interview with Christiane Amanpour, that he doesn't always see eye to eye with American terrorist designations: "I know that in America and some countries they look at some movements as terrorist movements. ... But there are differences. There are differences that some countries and some people that any group which comes from Islamic background are terrorists. And we don't accept that. It would be a 'big mistake', to consider every Islamic movement to be 'extremists'." It has been suggested that one of the designated groups that the Emir spoke of in this interview at CNN was Al-Nusra Front.

Al Nusra has kidnapped a diverse group of people from nationalities that span the globe, including Turkey, Fiji, Lebanon, Syria and Italy. On each occasion, Qatar engaged in a substantial financial agreement with Al Nusra in exchange for hostages. According to the one analyst, the reason why Al Nusra was the only plausible threat was because of Saudi and Qatari funding: "Jabhat Al-Nusra has become the best-armed force among the opposition groups. It has been at the tip of the spear in operations in Eastern Syria, Aleppo, and Damascus. Its combat proficiency and relatively greater access to material and funding have led other opposition groups to tolerate its participation in military operations across the country."

Qatar managed the negotiations with Al-Nusra Front that ultimately led to American writer Peter Theo Curtis's release. Qatari Intelligence Chief Ghanim Khalifa Al-Kubaisi sent a contact a text with the words "Done"—and a thumbs-up emoticon—after Curtis's release was completed.

According to The Fiscal Times, Qatar had great influence over the group that goes beyond ransom payments. In many cases, Qatar acted as a political mediator between Al Nusra and other countries such as Lebanon: "A prisoner swap between the Lebanese government and Al-Qaeda's branch in Syria, Al-Nusra Front in early December showed how powerful the group has become on the ground. The deal released 16 Lebanese soldiers and police officers who were captured during a joint ISIS–al-Nusra operation along with 29 civilians, some of whom are known terrorists." Indeed, Qatar's mediation between Al Nusra and Lebanon ultimately guaranteed Al-Nusra freedom of movement inside what was once a safe haven in Lebanon's Hamid valley, bordering Syria, giving Al Nusra access to the Lebanese town of Arsal.

But one diplomat went so far as to suggest that, beyond the scope of mediation and paying ransom, "They [Qatar] are partly responsible for Jabhat Al-Nusra having money and weapons and everything they need." The diplomat went on to say that while Qatar hasn't directly funded ISIS, it is responsible for the fact that ISIS gained Al Nusra weapons as members of Al Nusra are known to defect to ISIS.

Qatar's alleged support of Al Nusra was highly criticized in both U.S. and U.K media.

According to 2021 articles by The Times, Qatar has allegedly played a central role in a secret money laundering operation to send hundreds of millions of dollars to Al-Nusra Front terrorists in Syria.

== Weaponry and tactics ==
An Al-Nusra Front battalion training during the Syrian Civil War.

The organisation is believed to have used, at various times and in various places, the following tactics: suicide and car-bombs, chemical weapons, suicide-attacks, siege warfare, rocket and artillery shelling, targeting of checkpoints, conventional assault of military bases, assassination of political and military figures and members of the Shabiha, targeting (destruction/killing) of pro-government media stations and personnel.

By June 2013, there had been 70 suicide-attacks in Syria. Of these, the group denied responsibility for 13 but claimed responsibility for the other 57. In June 2012, the group attacked a pro-government TV station at Drousha, near Damascus. The following month TV presenter Mohammed Al-Saeed disappeared; the group later declared him dead.

In June 2014, Human Rights Watch reported that several rebel groups, including Al-Nusra, had enlisted child soldiers into their ranks. In November 2014, Al-Nusra claimed to have captured U.S.-made TOW anti-tank missiles supplied by the United States to moderate anti-Assad rebels. The group allegedly captured tanks, machine guns, ammunition, vehicles and American anti-tank missiles from the U.S.-backed Syrian Rebel Front.

Al-Nusra Front allegedly have an elite sniper unit known as the "Wolf Group". Training is conducted in Aleppo by veteran jihadists who belong to the Khorasan Group, a collection of veteran Al-Qaeda operatives sent from Al-Qaeda strongholds along the Afghan-Pakistan border.

In October 2015, Al-Julani called for indiscriminate attacks on Alawite villages in Syria. He said "There is no choice but to escalate the battle and to target Alawite towns and villages in Latakia".

=== Turkish arrests for alleged chemical weapon purchase ===
On 30 May 2013, Turkish newspapers reported that Turkish security forces had arrested Al-Nusra fighters in the southern provinces of Mersin and Adana near the Syrian border and confiscated 2 kg of sarin gas. The governor of Adana claimed that the security forces had not found sarin gas but unknown chemicals. The Turkish Ambassador to Moscow later said that tests showed the chemical seized was anti-freeze, not sarin. In September, six of those arrested in May (one Syrian, Heysem Topalca, and five Turks, alleged to be members of Al-Nusra and Ahrar Al-Sham) were charged with attempting to acquire chemicals which could be used to produce sarin; the indictment said that it was "possible to produce sarin gas by combining the materials in proper conditions." The indictment said that "The suspects have pleaded not guilty saying that they had not been aware the materials they had tried to obtain could have been used to make sarin gas. Suspects have been consistently providing conflicting and incoherent facts on this matter." The indictment said the suspects working for Al-Nusra and to Ahrar Al-Sham. The prosecutors were dismissed and the men were freed in October 2013. A new arrest warrant was later issued, but the perpetrators were never tried. Topalca was tried and convicted in absentia for other terrorism crimes, but not apprehended; he died in 2021.

== War crimes ==
On 29 May 2012, a mass execution was discovered near the eastern city of Deir ez-Zor. On 5 June 2012, Al-Nusra Front claimed responsibility for the 13 killings.

During the 2013 Latakia offensive by rebel Islamist groups in August 2013, Salafi rebel forces led by Al-Nusra Front systematically killed at least 190 civilians, and kidnapped hundreds more, according to Human Rights Watch (HRW). The inhabitants of over a dozen Alawite villages were forcibly displaced. HRW condemned the killings, and noted that they could rise to the level of "crimes against humanity".

On 10 September 2013, Al-Nusra fighters attacked the Alawite village of Maksar Al-Hesan, in Homs province. Al-Nusra later admitted to the killing of 30 civilians overall in three Alawite villages, including Maksar Al-Hesan.

On 11 December 2013, the rebel Islamic Front and Al-Nusra Front groups infiltrated the industrial area of the town of Adra, northeast of Damascus, attacking buildings housing workers and their families. The rebels targeted Alawites, Druze, Christians and Shiites, killing them on a sectarian basis. Some people were shot while others were beheaded.

On 10 June 2015, the Al-Nusra killed at least 20 Druze villagers in Qalb Lawzeh in Idlib province.

On 12 May 2016, according to pro-government media, rebels led by Al-Nusra Front and Ahrar Al-Sham massacred 42 civilians and seven NDF militiamen while kidnapping up to 70 people after taking control of the Alawite village of Zara'a in Southern Hama.

During the last days of the 17th Aleppo offensive in mid-December 2016, Al-Nusra Front arrested a media activist at a field hospital while he filmed the hospital operations. He was interrogated at Al-Nusra's headquarters before the evacuation. During the evacuation of rebels from Aleppo, Al-Nusra were the first to leave, along with prisoners whom they kidnapped.

== Designation as a terrorist organisation ==
Countries and organisations below have listed Al-Nusra Front as a terrorist organisation:

Country	Date	References
Iran	3 January 2012	
United States	10 December 2012	
United Nations Security Council	May 2013	
France	30 May 2013	
Australia	28 June 2013	
United Kingdom	19 July 2013	
Canada	7 November 2013	
Malaysia	2013	
Saudi Arabia	7 March 2014	
New Zealand	14 May 2014	
United Arab Emirates	19 May 2014	
Turkey	2 June 2014	
Russia	29 December 2014	
Japan		
Bahrain		
Kyrgyzstan		
Kazakhstan		
Tajikistan		
Ba'athist Syria		
Kuwait		
Lebanon		
Iraq		

== Relations with Israel ==
Circa 2014, Israel received information about an infiltration attack that Al-Nusra Front militants were planning from the Syrian side of the Golan Heights against an Israeli kibbutzim inside the (Israeli-occupied) Golan Heights. The information made it possible to thwart the attack, which was supposed to kill Israelis. Reportedly, Ahmed al-Sharaa himself approved of the attack.

In January 2015, A Syrian activist quoted Al-Monitor claimed that "the battle to capture Quneitra on Sept. 27 was preceded by coordination and communications between Abu Dardaa, a leader of Jabhat Al-Nusra, and the Israeli army to pave the way for the attack. And according to an FSA commander who partly participated in this battle, the Israeli army provided Abu Dardaa with maps of the border area and the Syrian army’s strategic posts in the southern area". He added that the rebels’ battle, led by Jabhat Al-Nusra, to control the Quneitra crossing took place in coordination with the Israeli army through Abu Dardaa and that during the clashes, the Israelis heavily bombarded many of the regime’s posts, shot down a warplane that was trying to impede the progress of the fighters and targeted other aircraft. Another Syrian opposition activist told Al-Monitor that the Israeli support in the battle of Tal Al-Hara was at a high level, and the Israeli army was the mastermind of this battle in terms of plans, tactics and follow-up. The communication devices released precise instructions in Arabic about what should be done by the fighters, moment by moment. An SAA general told Al-Monitor that Israel is not only supporting the rebels militarily and logistically and treating their wounds, but is also training them in the Israeli-controlled Golan Heights, and that they have filed a complaint about this training camp to the head of UNDOF and threatened to target it, yet the observers have no responded and the camp is still there.

In July 2015, Israel claimed that following a policy change regarding members of Al-Nusra Front that came about six weeks ago, it ceased treating wounded fighters of Al-Nusra Front in Israeli hospitals. An unnamed Israeli officer told Haaretz the injured Al-Nusra militants "infiltrated" into Israel to receive the medical care and that the Israeli army's background checks had not been comprehensive enough to properly check their identity. The IDF's decision to no longer treat these Al-Nusra fighters came a month after a Druze mob attacked an ambulance transporting wounded Syrian rebels, killing one of the injured in the process. Five members of the Druze community were later arrested for the lynching. However, on an interview which was conducted on 19 June 2017, Fursan Al-Joulan leader, Abu Muhammad, claimed that Hay'at Tahrir Al-Sham wounded militants were receiving treatment in Israel. This however does not prove that it is a matter of Israeli policy to provide treatment for Hay'at Tahrir Al-Sham members.

It is believed that on 4 August 2018, the Israeli Mossad assassinated the Syrian scientist, Aziz Azbar, with the assistance of Abu Amara Brigades, which is a faction within Hay'at Tahrir Al-Sham.

== See also ==
- List of armed groups in the Syrian Civil War
- List of terrorist incidents in Syria
- List of terrorist attacks in Damascus
