= Hurras al-Din =

Syrian Salafi jihadist militant group

- Arabic: تنظيم حراس الدين; Tanẓīm Ḥurrās al-Dīn
- Flag of the group Logo of the group
- Leaders: Khalid al-Aruri †; Sami al-Oraydi † (allegedly died); Abu Humam al-Shami (formerly)
- Founded: 27 February 2018
- Dates active: 27 February 2018 – 28 January 2025
- Groups: Jaysh al-Sahel; Saraya al-Sahel; Saraya al-Kabul; Jund al-Sharia; Jama'at Ansar al-Haq (former); Jaysh al-Malahim (former); Jaysh al-Badia (former)
- Active regions: Syria: Hama Governorate; Daraa Governorate; Idlib Governorate; Latakia Governorate
- Ideology: Salafi Jihadism: Islamic fundamentalism; Qutbism; Anti-Zionism
- Status: Disbanded
- Size: 1,000–2,000+ (2019); 3,500-5,000 (2020)
- Part of: al-Qaeda; Alliance to Support Islam (2018 – 2020); Rouse the Believers Operations Room (2018 – 2020); So Be Steadfast Operations Room (2020 – 2025)
- Wars: Syrian civil war: Eastern Syria insurgency; Idlib demilitarization (2018–2019); Northwestern Syria offensive (April–August 2019); American-led intervention; Northwestern Syria offensive (December 2019–March 2020); Idlib Governorate clashes (June 2020); Northwestern Syria clashes (December 2022–November 2024)

Tanzim Hurras al-Din (Arabic: تنظيم حراس الدين, romanized: Tanẓīm Ḥurrās ad-Dīn, lit. 'Guardians of the Religion Organization'), sometimes referred to as Al-Qaeda in Syria, was a Salafi Jihadist organization that fought in the Syrian civil war. (Note: Hurras al-Din has also been referred to by the name Sham al-Ribat (Arabic: شام الرباط) on sanctioning lists, this however was the name of its former media outlet.) The group's former head, Abu Humam al-Shami, was the general military commander of the defunct Al-Nusra Front, and had fought for Al-Qaeda during the Third Afghan Civil War and the Iraqi insurgency. Hurras al-Din was established by the leaders of the AQ-affiliated Khorasan group and Al-Qaeda loyalists of Al-Nusra Front who opposed Al-Nusra's dissolution and merger with other Islamic groups to form Tahrir al-Sham. Al-Shami announced the formation of Hurras al-Din on 27 February 2018. It was the last Al-Qaeda affiliate in Syria.

Abu Jilibib Tubasi and Abu Khadija al-Urduni, members of Hurras al-Din's shura council, left Jabhat Fateh al-Sham (JFS) in 2016 due to its disassociation from Al-Qaeda and emphasis on local Syrian politics. In 2017, JFS officially disbanded and merged with Noor al-Deen al-Zenki, Liwa al-Haqq, Ansar al-Din Front, Jaysh al-Sunna and elements of Ahrar al-Sham to form Hay'at Tahrir al-Sham (HTS). Following a series of assassinations of HTS leaders in 2017; AQ leaders Abu Mussab al-Libi, Abu Julaybib al-Ordoni, and Sami al-Oraydi were arrested by HTS in November 2017, in an attempt to stave off the formation of another Al-Qaeda affiliated group in Syria.

In November 2017, Jaysh al-Badia and Jaysh al-Malahim defected from HTS, pledging allegiance to Al-Qaeda and launched military operations to expand its influence in Idlib. This brought them into conflict with HTS, which was making efforts to unite Idlib under a civilian administration. HTS accused Al-Qaeda and IS of undermining the Syrian revolution and responded by initiating an anti-AQ crackdown, arresting several leaders of Al-Qaeda Central. On 27 February 2018, Jaysh al-Badia, Jaysh al-Malahim and Jaysh al-Sahel united under the leadership of Abu Humam al-Shami to form Hurras al-Din; announcing its allegiance to Al-Qaeda. In a statement, Hurras al-Din called upon all Islamist factions to set aside differences and launch a coordinated military response in the wake of various atrocities committed by the Assad regime during its Siege of Eastern Ghouta.

While the organization officially rejects infighting between other rebel groups, it has been entangled in armed conflict with Hayat Tahrir al-Sham since 2020. In 2019, Hurras al-Din was reported to be at its height of power, with around 2,500 armed fighters under its command. After its full-frontal conflict with HTS since late 2020, it has suffered countless losses and has been subsequently expelled from Idlib. Since 2020, the group mostly operated clandestinely in various parts of Syria; calling for operations against forces of the Ba'athist regime, Russia as well as against the United States and its allies. It has also urged Palestinian Islamist groups to step up its insurgency against Israel to "liberate Al-Aqsa Mosque".

Hurras al-Din was officially registered by the United States as a Specially Designated Global Terrorist entity on 10 September 2019 and by Australia as a terrorist organization on 9 April 2022.

On 28 January 2025, approximately two months after the fall of the Assad regime, the group declared its dissolution.

== History ==
In February 2018, the group stated that it is opposed to the fighting between the Syrian Liberation Front and Tahrir al-Sham. However, Jaysh al-Sahel, which is part of Hurras al-Din said that it would fight the SLF if the towns of Muhambal, Bisanqul, and Kafr Shalaya are attacked.

On 26 April 2018, Hurras al-Din, along with Ansar al-Tawhid, and Jaysh al-Izza, launched a joint attack against Syrian Government forces in the northern countryside of the Hama Governorate.

On 12 October 2018, the Russian government's reconciliation center in Syria accused the group of hoarding materials needed to develop chemical weapons for a false flag attack as well as being an ISIL affiliate. Along with Russian officials accusing the group of being an ISIL affiliate Iraqi media has claimed the group is also an ISIL affiliate operating along the Syrian-Iraqi border, however the group's base of operations is in the Idlib governorate of Syria, the group has not claimed any attacks outside the region nor have any other reports of activity outside of Syria been reported.

On 15 October 2018, the group published a video filmed in Saraqib which showed the group's religious police, the hisbah, driving around the city with loudspeakers calling on people to adhere to sharia.

On 29 December 2018, one of the group's founders, named Abu Julaybib, was killed by government forces in the Daraa Governorate while preparing to establish an insurgent cell linked to the group in southern Syria.

On 30 June 2019, in a rare operation against non-ISIL elements, the U.S. carried out a strike against a Hurras al-Din leadership meeting at a training facility west of Aleppo which killed eight jihadists, including six commanders: two Tunisians, two Algerians, an Egyptian and a Syrian. It was the first known U.S. strike in western Syria since February 2017 due to the U.S. and Russia arranging an unofficial deconfliction boundary that largely bars any substantial U.S. forces from venturing into the region. The U.S. did not specify what assets were used in the strike.

On 31 August 2019, the U.S. carried out a series of airstrikes on a Rouse the Believers Operations Room meeting between Kafriya and Maarrat Misrin, killing over 40 Hurras al-Din militants, including several leaders.

On 27 October 2019, members of the group were killed during a US raid targeting ISIL's leader Abu Bakr al-Baghdadi in Barisha. A commander of the group named Abu Muhammad al-Halabi, the owner of the house Baghdadi was staying at, was killed during the raid. An Iraqi intelligence official and Hisham al-Hashimi have stated to The Independent that Halabi was also a smuggler, which is why the ISIL head and his family utilized his services. According to Der Spiegel, his host was a known IS sympathizer named Salam Haj Deen.

On 10 March 2020, Hurras al-Din raided the town of Tanjarah, which was under control of the Syrian Army, and captured the town. Heavy fighting took place following a counterattack by the Syrian army to retake the town. 35 soldiers of the Syrian Army and 13 HaD fighters were killed in the fighting.

After a fallout within the Rouse the Believers Operation Room, the group joined four other jihadist groups on 12 June 2020 to form the So Be Steadfast Operations Room.

On 23 June, after putting up checkpoints around Idlib and refusing to take them down at Hayat Tahrir al-Sham requests an open conflict began between the two groups. The conflict killed 18 member of Hurras al-Din, 11 members of Hayat Tahrir al-Sham, and one civilian.

On 1 January 2021, the group attacked a Russian military base in the northern part of the Raqqa Governorate, in an area held by the Syrian Democratic Forces. The attack was notable for being carried outside of the group's main areas of operation in the Idlib Governorate. During the attack, five members of the group were killed carrying out suicide bombings and injuring between two and three Russian soldiers at the base.

On 4 August 2021, a bus carrying members of the Syrian Republican Guard exploded in Damascus. Syrian state-media claimed that the explosion was due to a short circuit in the bus that caused the fuel tank to blow up, and that 1 person was killed along with 3 others injured. Hurras al-Din however claimed responsibility for the incident, stating that they had bombed the bus as revenge for the fighting in Daraa, and that the casualties of the attack was upwards of 19.

Frequent targeting of Hurras al-Din's senior leadership by the United States has crippled the group's operational capacity. The group has not claimed an attack since 2021, though it still publishes media releases.

On 28 January 2025, in a written statement, the group congratulated the Syrian people on their victory over the Assad regime and announced its dissolution, but it urged Syrians to remain vigilant, refrain from laying down their arms, and prepare for the "coming stages of great battles against tyrants and colonizers."

During Operation Hawkeye Strike, CENTCOM conducted a drone strike that killed former al-Qaeda aligned Hurras al-Din leader Bilal Hasan al Jasim in Aleppo Governorate on 17 January 2026.

On 26 October 2026, a drone strike near Al-Qastal resulted in the death of a senior Hurras al-Din field commander and former General Security Services member named Abu Abdulrahman al-Libi, as well as two deaths and one wounded. Local reports state the strike was conducted by the United States due to labeled Hellfire missile debris being found at the site, however no claims of responsibility for the strike have been made.

== Relations with other groups ==
Hurras al-Din was a part of the So Be Steadfast Operations Room, which is a reformation of the Rouse the Believers Operations Room (also known as the Incite the Believers Operations Room), following Ansar al Tawhid's defection from the Rouse the Believers Operations Room on 3 May 2020. The Rouse the Believers Operations Room was led by Hurras al-Din alongside three other jihadist factions based in northwestern Syria, and alongside Ansar al-Tawhid, established the Alliance to Support Islam in early 2018.

Flag of Al-Nusra Front, Al-Qaeda's original official branch in Syria until separating in 2016 and dissolving itself to form Hayat Tahrir al-Sham in 2017.

=== Al-Qaeda ===
The group is sometimes disputedly considered Al-Qaeda's branch in Syria. The group broke away from Hayat Tahrir al-Sham in 2018 a year after the formation of Hayat Tahrir al-Sham due to internal tensions in the organization over issues including its allegiance to Al-Qaeda and its leaders, furthermore the Khorasan Group that was believed by several intelligence agencies and analysts to be part of al-Nusra, which later became HTS, is thought to have evolved into becoming part of Hurras al-Din. Al-Qaeda also reportedly sent senior cadres from its central command nodes in Afghanistan, Pakistan, and Iran to support the foundation of Hurras al-Din.

=== ISIL ===
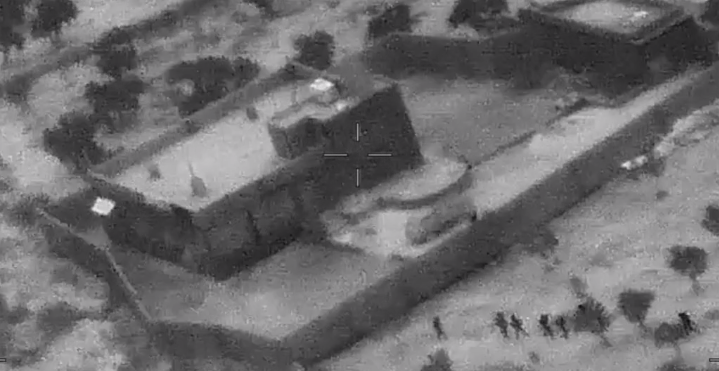
US Special forces raiding the compound of Abu Bakr al-Baghdadi in northern Idlib where Hurras al-Din members were also present.

The group has instructed its members not to associate with ISIL with threat of expulsion from the group and prosecution, while ISIL declared the group to be heretical in its weekly newspaper al-Naba.

However, there are believed to be ISIL-sympathizers in Hurras al-Din, and prior to the group's foundation as it began as a sub faction of Hayat Tahrir al-Sham in 2017 the year of Hayat Tahrir al-Sham's inception, ISIL reportedly began building ties with these elements prior to the group's formal foundation.

ISIL also began building a contingency plan upon their decline that involved regrouping in opposition held parts of Idlib, including asking the Syrian Democratic Forces during the Battle of Baghuz Fawqani for passage out of the area to Idlib with assistance from Hurras al-Din, and the group playing a role in the process, with ISIL infiltrating it, by recruiting members of the group sympathetic to ISIL to act as agents including senior leadership, as well as facilitating a flow of displaced fighters from former ISIL-held territories and strongholds to Idlib to join Hurras al-Din. From there, they planned on carrying out assassinations and sabotage campaigns against individuals in the group and other groups and individuals opposed to ISIL, then formally declaring allegiance to ISIL, when ISIL saw the time as right.

In 2018, Iraqi media and security officials claimed to have captured members of Hurras al-Din embedded with ISIL fighters from the Syrian border town of Abu Kamal on the Iraqi border heading towards Iraq's Anbar Governorate, and that the group was seeking to expand its presence to northern and central Iraq, and that it was also working with the Army of the Men of the Naqshbandi Order, which is led by former Saddam Hussein-era Baathist officers, including Izzat Ibrahim al-Douri, the Iraqi government also claimed local political parties were financing the group to help it expand into former ISIL-held territories, however the validity of the reports has been questioned.

Prior the foundation of Hurras al-Din, al-Oraydi, who holds an influential position in the group, criticized ISIL and claimed they were Kharijites, and called them "Muslim Killers"; he also said that Abu Muhammad al-Adnani, ISIL's official spokesman at the time, was ignorant and didn't understand the things he said, as well as several posts on Twitter critical of ISIL, during his tenure as al-Nusra's top Sharia official.

In 2016, Saif al-Adel, an Egyptian Al-Qaeda member who later became part of Hurras al-Din's leadership, also criticized ISIL saying they were twisted and had perverted thoughts.

In January 2019, as part of a campaign a formation called "Free the female prisoners" was established, with the stated goals of freeing female ISIL prisoners held in Syrian Democratic Forces-run internment camps such as the Al-Hawl refugee camp. The formation is believed to be associated with Hurras al-Din. However, a separate campaign with the same goal launched by ISIL itself called "Kafel" has denounced the Free the Female Prisoners campaign as apostates. Free the Female Prisoners has denied being linked to either ISIL or Hurras al-Din and claims to be an independent organization willing to work with any faction to achieve their goal of freeing female ISIL prisoners.

In August 2019, an unofficial ISIL media outlet called the Muhajireen Foundation, which provides reports and updates on events that may affect ISIL foreign fighters displaced in Syria, released an infographic showing three separate anti-ISIL operations by HTS in Idlib. One of the raids carried out by HTS targeted members of Hurras al-Din and Ansar al-Tawhid who had ties to ISIL. Two of the arrested individuals were Egyptians. However previously in January 2019, the same foundation cautioned ISIL members displaced in Idlib to avoid large gatherings and avoid Hayat Tahrir al-Sham and Hurras al-Din, because HTS and Hurras al-Din had arrested several ISIL members, the warning also called both HTS and Hurras al-Din apostates.

In October 2019, based on a receipt book of ISIL reportedly found by associates of former American intelligence official Asaad Almohammad, analysts have stated that Baghdadi was paying the members of the group in exchange for hiding him. According to the receipts, ISIL paid at least $67,000 to them from early 2017 to mid-2018, including $7,000 in summer 2018 to prepare bases for ISIL fighters from "al-Khair province", hinting that they helped in smuggling ISIL members. Aymenn Jawad Al-Tamimi pointed to the fact that two groups opposition towards each other. However, Tamimi also speculated that some of the receipts obtained were fabrications, except the ones from March to July 2018 that he was shown.

It is also believed that some members might also be part of a pro-ISIL faction despite the group's official stance regarding ISIL which is critical and generally opposed to it, including reportedly instructing its members not to associate with ISIL members, and ISIL viewing the group as heretical due to their support of the Taliban and al-Qaeda, as well as the group's hesitance to confront Hayat Tahrir al-Sham, despite tensions between the two.

=== Hayat Tahrir al-Sham ===
The group has held tensions with Hayat Tahrir al-Sham on numerous occasions but has largely avoided armed confrontation with HTS, with most of the tensions being confined to media campaigns against each other. In January 2019, Hurras al-Din accused HTS of being involved in a secret plan to establish a military council under the control of the mainstream Syrian opposition including ex-government defectors, that would be supervised by Turkey, Hurras al-Din also claimed that HTS was willing to open the M5 highway to traffic from government-held areas.

Though holding tensions with HTS, the leadership of Hurras al-Din is respected among HTS members, reportedly causing hesitance for the two to openly fight each other, and HTS adopting a policy of containing the group rather than confronting it in open conflict.

On 7 February 2019, members of Hurras al-Din shot at a car with HTS members inside following tensions in January. Hurras al-Din later signed an agreement following the incident, and Hurras al-Din apologized for killing an HTS member killed by the gunfire. Over the following days afterwards several agreements were made between HTS and Hurras al-Din to de-escalate tensions between the two.

In late October 2019, a faction of Hurras al-Din led by a cleric named Abu al-Yaman al-Wazzani separated from the group, and formed a new group called Ansar al-Haq. Wazzani and his supporters claimed that Hurras al-Din had not held up obligations that they believe the group had promised to uphold, and believed Hurras al-Din was lacking in the enforcement of Sharia law. Followers of Wazzani were mostly reported to be former Jund al-Aqsa and Faylaq al-Sham fighters. Ansar al-Haq was also critical of HTS and its relaxed policy regarding Sharia, believing that HTS allowed immorality and did not implement justice, and also viewed HTS as an oppressive body. After the formation of Ansar al-Haq, HTS arrested Wazzani and his followers. HTS also holds tensions with Jaysh Khorasan, a group close to Hurras al-Din.

== Analysis ==
It was thought by the Israeli Intelligence and Terrorism Information Center that the formation of the group would weaken HTS. Alexander Sehmer of the Jamestown Foundation has stated that Guardians of the Religion Organization gave Al Qaeda the best opportunity to improve its fortunes in Syria.

== Organization ==
=== Leadership ===
- Abu Jilibib Tubasi, killed in December 2018
- Bilal Khuraisat, also known as Abu Khadija al-Urduni, killed in December 2019
- Sami al-Oraydi
- Khalid al-Aruri, also known as Abu al-Qasem al-Urduni, killed in June 2020
- Saif al-Adel
- Abu 'Abd al-Karim al-Masri, Shura council member and external mediator
- Abu Humam al-Shami
- Sari Shihab, also known as Abu Khallad al-Muhandis, killed in August 2019
- Abu Adnan al-Homsi, logistics and equipment commander, killed in June 2020
- Abu Dhar al-Masri, killed on 15 October 2020
- Abu Yusuf al-Maghribi, killed on 15 October 2020
- Abu Hamzah al Yemeni, killed by drone strike in June 2022
- Abu Ubaidah al-Iraqi, killed by drone strike in February 2023
- Abu Abdul Rahman al-Makki, senior leader, killed during a drone strike in Idlib in August 2024.
- Marwan Bassam 'Abd-al-Ra'uf, a senior leader who oversaw the group's military operation in Syria, killed in a U.S. airstrike in September 2024.
- Muhammad Salah al-Zubair, killed in a U.S. airstrike in January 2025.
- Wasim Tahsin Bayraqdar, killed in a U.S. airstrike on 21 February 2025.
- Muhammed Yusuf Ziya Talay, killed in a U.S. airstrike on 23 February 2025.
