= Muhydin Lazikani =

Syrian writer

Muhydin Lazikani is a Syrian writer, poet and thinker. He is the editor-in-chief of Al-Hod Hod, an internet journal in five languages: Arabic, English, French, Spanish and Persian. He has a doctorate in Arabic Literature, and has published several books and collections of poetry.

== Biography ==
Dr. Muhydin Lazikani is a poet, thinker and critic. He was born in Sarmada, Syria in 1951. He obtained an MA and PhD in Arabic literature from the University of Aleppo and the University of Alexandria. He has worked as a journalist and columnist for several daily newspapers and magazines, and as a presenter on several satellite TV channels. His column "Tawaheen Al-Kalam" won the Best Arabic Column Award in 1995. He has hosted two political and intellectual talk shows on Arabic media: Lanterns in the Dark and A Date with the Future.

In addition to his career in the media, Lazikani has worked as a visiting lecturer at several universities, and has published many poetry collections, plays and volumes of literary criticism. His book The Fathers of Arabic Modernism assessed Arabic modernism. He is also known for his controversial studies in the literature of the secret movements of Islam—especially that of the Karmati Movement. His interest in reviving Arabic heritage, led him to establish the International Centre for Arabic Manuscripts (ICAM) in London, England; its purpose is to save Arabic manuscripts before they are destroyed.

He has participated in numerous media- and culture-based conferences, and his work has been translated into several languages. He has lived in exile in many countries since 1976, and settled in London in 1979.

== Education ==
Lazikani has a BA with distinction in Arabic Literature from Aleppo University, Syria (1974); an MA with honours in Literature of the Karmuti movement from Alexandria University, Egypt. (1984); and a PhD with honours in images and imagery in modern Arabic poetry. from Alexandria University, Egypt (1989).

== Career ==
=== Newspaper and magazines ===
In the 1970s Lazikana was a feature editor at Al-Asboo’ al-Arabi (Arabian Weekly). Beirut, Lebanon; a political editor at Al-Wahda (Unity) newspaper, and the managing editor of Azaffra Weekly magazine, and Al-Azmina al-Arabiya, all in Abu-Dhabi, UAE.

Lazikana was managing editor of the Arabian Times magazine and Awraak cultural magazine, both in London, UK. He was a foreign correspondent based in London for Annashra weekly magazine, published in Athens, Greece, and a columnist for al-Arab daily newspaper in London in the 1980s.

In the 1990s, he was head of the cultural department of Sowt al-Kuwait daily newspaper, and a columnist, head of cultural section and art editor of Al-Sharq al-Awsat daily newspaper—both in London.

In 2007 he established, and has since contributed to, Al-HodHod journal in London, an online newspaper in five languages (Arabic, English, French, Spanish and Persian).

=== Broadcasting career ===
Between 1977 and 1979 Lazikani wrote several scenarios for Abu-Dhabi TV, UAE. Between 1999 and 2003, he was the producer and presenter of Qanadeel fil Zalaam (Lanterns in the Dark), a weekly (and subsequently twice weekly) live TV programme concerned with political and social events in the Arab world for the ANN satellite channel. In 2005-2006 he was the producer and presenter of Mow’ad Ma’ al-Mostakbal (Date with the Future), a live weekly political programme for Democracy and Mostakilla satellite channel.

=== Major conferences and lectures ===
Participated and lectured in numerous media and cultural conferences, including: book fairs in Frankfurt, Cairo, Casablanca, Sharjah (UAE), Kuwait, and Brazil. He has appeared at the Asseela Festival in Morocco, the Cannes Festival in France, the Kartaaj Festival in Tunisia and the Oqaaz Festival in Amaan, Jordan. He has also appeared at the Montadda Al-Eeslah al-Arabi (Forum of Arabic Reforms) in Alexandria, Egypt, and the European-Arab Dialogue in Barcelona, Spain, and Dubai, UAE.

== Publications ==
=== Poetry and plays ===
His poetic works include The Suicide of Job (Intihar Ayoob), A Song Outside the Flock (Oghnia Kharij al Sirb), and Whoever is Sad, Follow Me (Man Kana Hazinan Fal Yatba’ni).

He has also written a play, Pigeons do not like Vodka (Al-hamam la yohiboo al-vodka), a black comedy set in a prison. This play, published in the early 1970s, predicted the era of forging democracy in the Arab world.

=== Critical works ===
Lazikani's critical works include Trilogy of Karmuti Dreams (Tholasiat al-holom al-karmuti): A study about the most dangerous secret movement in Islam in the 3rd century of Hijrah. This movement established small emirates in different regions of the Islamic world, destabilised the Abassi Khalifahs; Against the Current (Aks al- Tayar): Essays in Arabic literary criticism, re-evaluating the progress of Arabic poetry and novels in modern times; and The Fathers of Arabic Modernism (Abba’ al Hadatha al-Arabia): A study that returns Arabic modernism to its roots, establishing that the real ‘fathers’ of Arabic modernism are writers from the 2nd, 3rd and 4th centuries of Hijrah: al-Jahiz, al-Halaaj and al-Towhidi.

=== Social and cultural studies ===
His works in this area include The Wordmill (Tawaheen Al-Kalam): Short essays and articles dealing with different cultural, social and political aspects of modern Arab life; and The Woman, the Universal Lamp (Al-ontha Misbah al-kowm - Odisaa anisa’ bayna alhoriya wal haramlik): A panoramic view of women in history and in the modern world, concentrating on women’s positive achievements in art, media, education and other aspects of life.

=== Travel writing ===
In a A Seagull Without a Compass: Visits to Places of Love and Mythology (Nowras bila Bosela: Rahlaat ila Moodon Al-Ishk wal Astoora), the writer visits many special places with historical and mythological heritage, including Rhodes, Istanbul, Havana, Mexico, Vienna, Fes, and Kayrawan.
