= Sami al-Oraydi =

Jordanian Islamic militant (1973–2026)

- سامي العريدي
- Born: 1973; Amman, Jordan
- Military career
- Allegiance: Al-Qaeda
- Branch: Al-Nusra Front (2012–17); Hurras al-Din (2018–25)
- Service years: 2012–Present
- Rank: Former Deputy leader of the al-Nusra Front
- Conflicts: Syria: Syrian Civil War; Lebanon: Syrian Civil War spillover in Lebanon; Military intervention against ISIL: American-led intervention in Syria

Sami Mahmud Mohammed al-Oraydi or Abu Mahmoud al-Shami (also: al-Uraydi; Arabic: سامي محمود محمد العُرَيدي, romanized: Sāmī Maḩmūd Muḥammad al-ʿUraydī; 1973) is a Jordanian militant who served as a senior official for the al-Qaeda-affiliated Hurras al-Din. He was previously the chief religious authority for al-Nusra Front and the group's former second-in-command.

== Background ==
Sami al-Oraydi was born in Amman, Jordan, in 1973, and received his bachelor's degree in religious studies from the University of Jordan. In 1997 he received a master's degree from the same university in Hadith studies and, in 2001, completed his PhD in the same subject. He wrote a number of books about the 14th century scholar Ibn Taymiyyah.

Al-Oraydi was influenced by the teachings of Syrian jihadist Abu Musab al-Suri, who fought against the Syrian government in the 1970s and '80s.

== Syrian Civil War ==
Al-Oraydi was a member of the al-Nusra Front. He acted as the group's chief sharia authority and reportedly served as the group's second-in-command. He was previously al-Nusra's second highest sharia authority under former religious leader and military commander Abu Maria Al-Qahtani. Al-Oraydi was promoted over al-Qahtani after the Islamic State of Iraq and the Levant (ISIL) overran Nusra Front positions in eastern Syria in 2014.

He used social media to release sermons and declarations on behalf of the Al-Nusra Front. He maintained a Twitter account under the handle @sami_oride and reportedly tweeted that the "ideal" jihadist is a moral individual watched by God and the public. Al-Oraidi also used social media to attack ISIL, particularly after the group declared its caliphate in June 2014. Al-Oraydi said ISIL spokesman Abu Mohammad al-Adnani "does not know what comes out of his head." He also referred to ISIL's leaders as "Muslim killers." He declared war on ISIL in a December 2014 sermon.

Al-Oraydi accused ISIL of being Kharijites and denounced the group for being too extreme, saying in an audio released in 2014 that "Jihad has taught me that leniency in dealing with extremists and Kharijites is disregard for the blood of the Sunnis and the Mujaheddin. Every Jihad arena they enter, they shed the blood of the mujahideen."

After the formation of Hay'at Tahrir al-Sham, al-Oraydi left the group, along with another senior al-Nusra leader, and was later arrested by HTS with several other pro-al-Qaeda elements from the group, including Abu Humam al-Shami, Abu al-Qassem al-Urduni and Abu Julaybib al-Urduni; the arrests were condemned by ISIL. His resignation was confirmed by Abu Muhammad al-Maqdisi. Al-Oraydi joined the shura council of Hurras al-Din in February 2018.

== Reported death ==
Al-Oraydi reportedly died in a U.S.-led coalition airstrike in northern Syria on 20 June 2026, although the specific strike in Northwest Syria killed a senior ISIS leader named Ali Husayn al-'Ulaywi, claimed by United States Central Command, with no mention of al-Oraydi. In August 2026, an article penned by him was released by a pro-al-Qaeda media group. The U.S. Department of State's Rewards for Justice Program continues to offer up to $5 million reward for information on his whereabouts.
