= Jasminka Ramic =

- Born: 1973 (age 52–53); Bosnia
- Occupation: convicted of supporting terrorism
- Children: 2

Jasminka Ramic (born 1973) is a joint citizen of Bosnia and the United States who pled guilty to supporting terrorism in an American court, in 2015. Ramic and five other Bosnian-Americans were charged in February 2015. American intelligence officials described Ramic and Ramiz Zijad Hodzic, Sedina Unkic Hodzic, Medy Salkicevic, Armin Harcevic, and Nihad Rosic as being followers of Abdullah Ramo Pazara, another Bosnian-American, who travelled to Syria and volunteered to fight on behalf of ISIS.

Ramic moved to the US in 2000, became an American citizen in 2006, but moved to Germany, in 2014, to live with relatives who had settled there, after filing bankruptcy in the USA.

In 2012-2013 Ramic worked as a nutrition consultant in Rockford Illinois, for her local schoolboard.

The other five individuals were all arrested by American law enforcement officials, when charges were laid. Ramic was arrested by German officials, and chose to waive her right to contest her extradition. Unlike the other five Ramic chose to plead guilty, on September 28, 2015. She was sentenced, on January 5, 2016, to three years imprisonment, to be followed by three years of supervised release.

During her sentencing the court was informed Ramic first sent funds to Pazara based on claims on his facebook page that he was helping orphans. The court was informed that Ramic had a long history of supporting humanitarian causes. The prosecution argued that she sent funds to help support Pazara's activities on three occasions, in 2013, for a total of US$700, even after she learned he was fighting for the al Nusra Front.

According to press reports Ramic sent that $700 to Pazara even though the mortgage on her home was in default.

Even though Ramic pled guilty in 2016, in 2017 she joined with her alleged co-conspirators in a motion to get their charges dropped. They argued that Pazara should be considered a lawful combatant, claiming he fought with militia's that operated with the support of the US government.

Ramic was married, and bore two children.
