= Baqirha =

Ancient settlement in northwestern Syria

Temple of Zeus Bomos at Baqirha
- Location within Syria
- 36°12′23″N 36°39′34″E
- Type: Archaeological site / Roman temple
- Periods: Antiquity, Late antiquity
- Cultures: Roman, Byzantine
- Satellite of: Roman Empire
- Associated with: Romans, early Christians, Syrian civilians (modern temporary shelter)
- Location: Baqirha, Jebel Barisha
- Region: Idlib Governorate
- Part of: Dead Cities (Ancient Villages of Northern Syria)

History
- Built: 161 A.D.
- Abandoned: c. 6th–7th century A.D.

Site notes
- Material: Limestone
- Excavation dates: Documented by the American Archaeological Expedition to Syria (1899–1900)
- Archaeologists: Howard Crosby Butler
- Condition: Ruined (partially standing cella walls and a portico column)
- Owner: State property
- Management: Directorate-General of Antiquities and Museums (DGAM)
- Public access: Yes

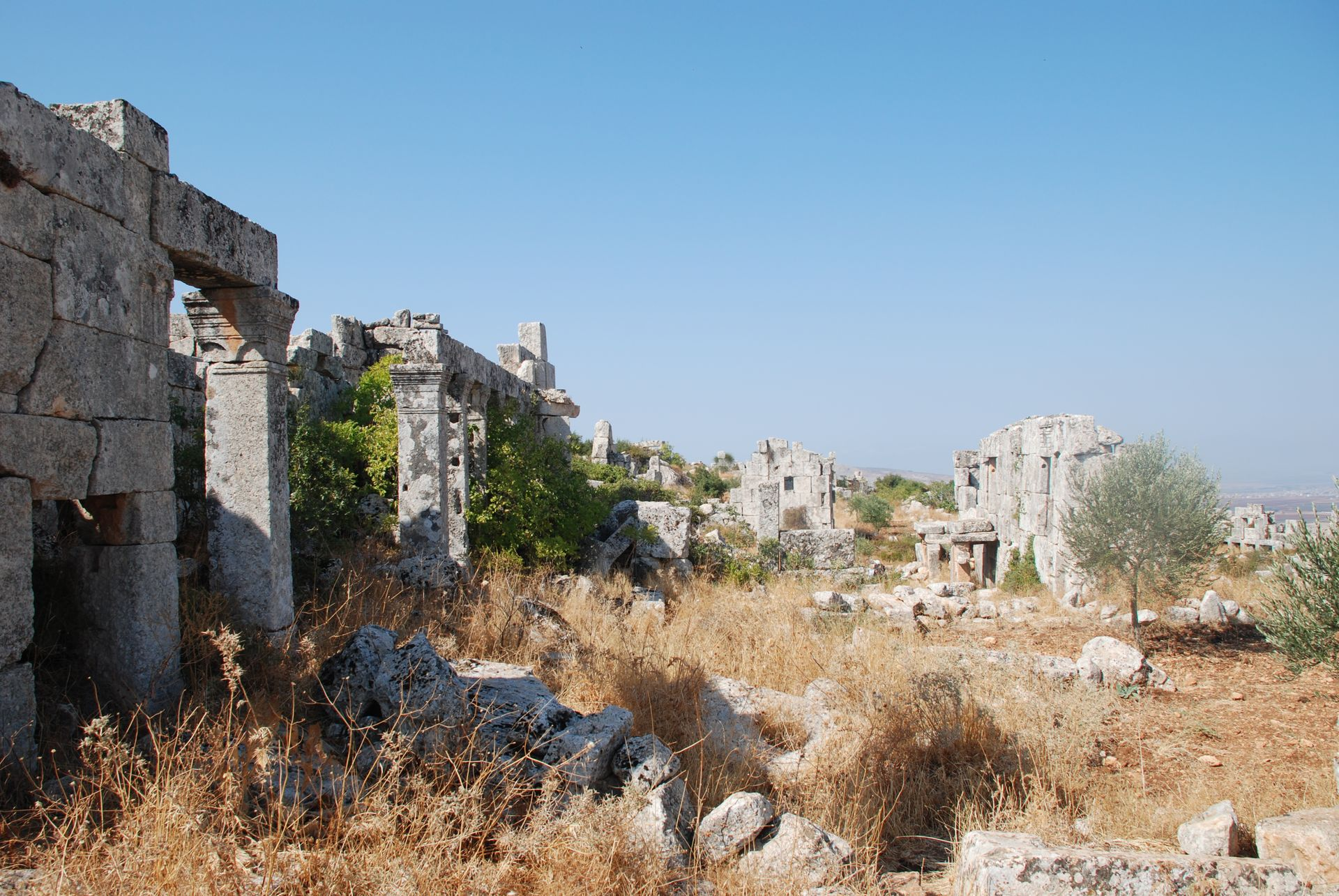
Baqirha today

Baqirha (also spelled Bāķirḥā) was an ancient settlement in the Dead Cities area in northwestern Syria. The ruins of a temple from the Roman period and the remains of two churches and some residences from the early Byzantine period have been preserved. Baqirha was inscribed as a UNESCO World Heritage Site in 2011 as part of the “Ancient Villages of Northern Syria” site.

== Location ==
Baqirha lies on a hill called Burj Baqirha (Burj: Arabic: برج, lit. 'Tower') in Idlib Governorate on the northern slope of the Harim Mountains in the central area of the northern Syrian limestone massif. Six kilometres to the north-east lies the ancient settlement of Ba'uda on the same karst and treeless rock hill, from which the Bab al-Hawa border crossing on the main road from Aleppo to Antakya in Turkey can be seen just under two kilometres away. A few hundred meters north below Baqirha, the road leads to the poorly preserved neighbouring village of Dar Qitapast. In a southerly direction it is two kilometres to a crossroads in the tiny village of Ras ibn Hosn and another four kilometres to the south to the extensive early Byzantine settlement of Barisha, whose ruined houses are hidden between trees and bushes, unlike Baqirha, which can be seen from afar. The large settlement of Dehes is just as far south-west of Baqirha.

Above Baqirha only a few small olive trees thrive, otherwise grassland littered with boulders is predominant, which is used as pasture for sheep and horses. The ruins are uninhabited and there are several small villages in the vicinity.

== History ==
=== Temple ===
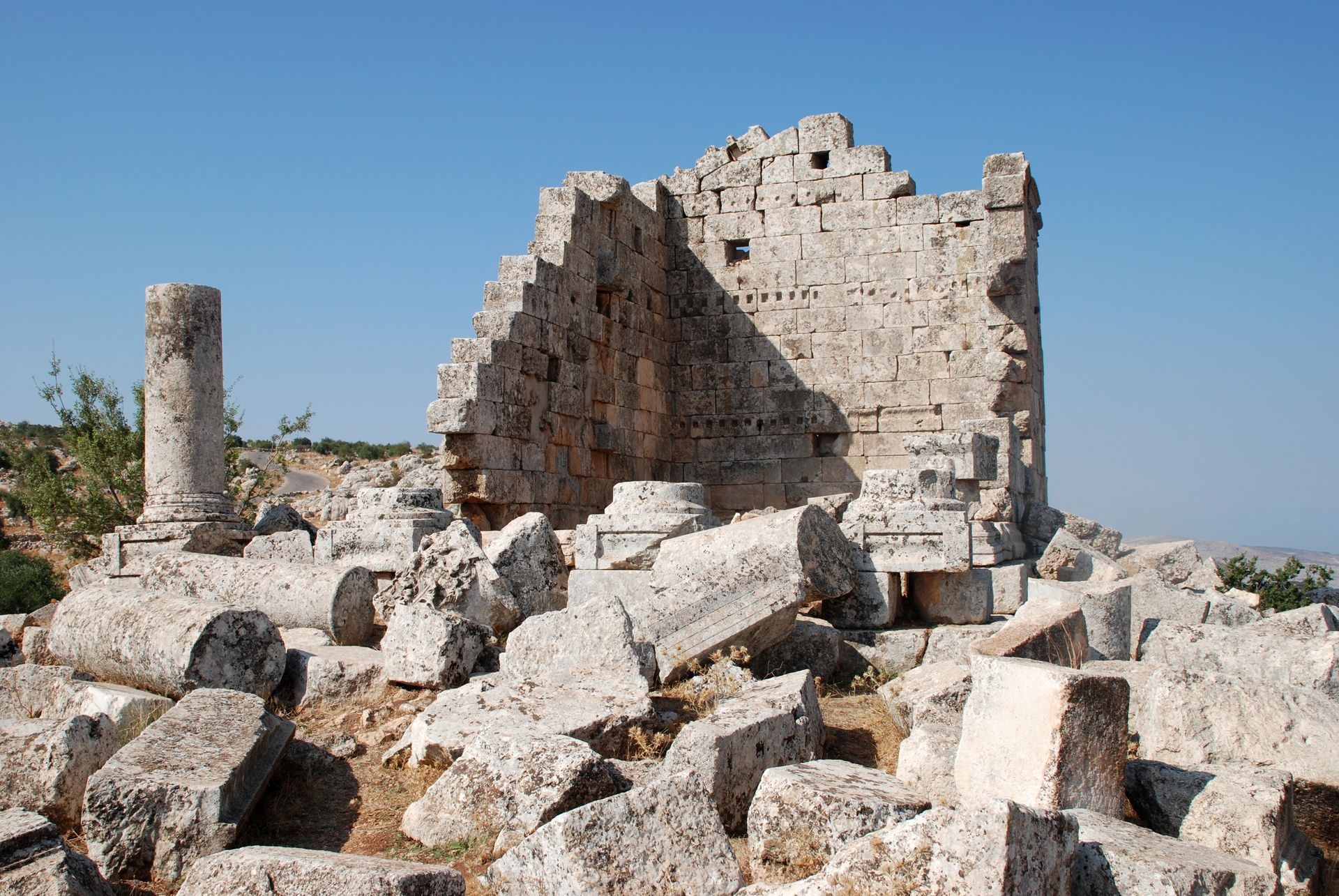
Temple of Zeus Bomos

The oldest building is a Roman prostyle temple, which stands at the upper, southern end away from the settlement near the street. It may have been built on the site of a much older sanctuary. The temple from the year 161 AD was dedicated to Zeus Bomos (" Zeus, the altar"), a local name for the main Syrian god Baal. Zeus' temples were often built on mountains; another was in close proximity on the summit of Jebel Sheikh Baraqat (south of Refade), and several around the summit of Hermon. It is not known which deity was worshipped in the temple of Babisqa, two kilometres to the east.

Above the base of the temple, which is comparable to the Baal Shamin temple in Palmyra, a rectangular building made of mighty limestone blocks rose, to which an entrance hall with four pillars was presented on the west side. The eastern rear wall up to the gable and part of the north wall were preserved. In front of the temple are the sections of the collapsed columns and Corinthian capitals.

Two houses from the 3rd century are preserved in ruins, the remaining ruins date from the 4th to 7th centuries. The religious dispute in the 4th century seems to have only gradually been decided in Baqirha in favour of Christianity. Soon after the reign of the Roman emperor Julian (360–363), the first Christians are documented in writing. From 384 a deacon named Mikalos owned his own house. At the same time, Zeus was worshipped here and in Dar Qita until the end of the 5th century.

=== Western church ===
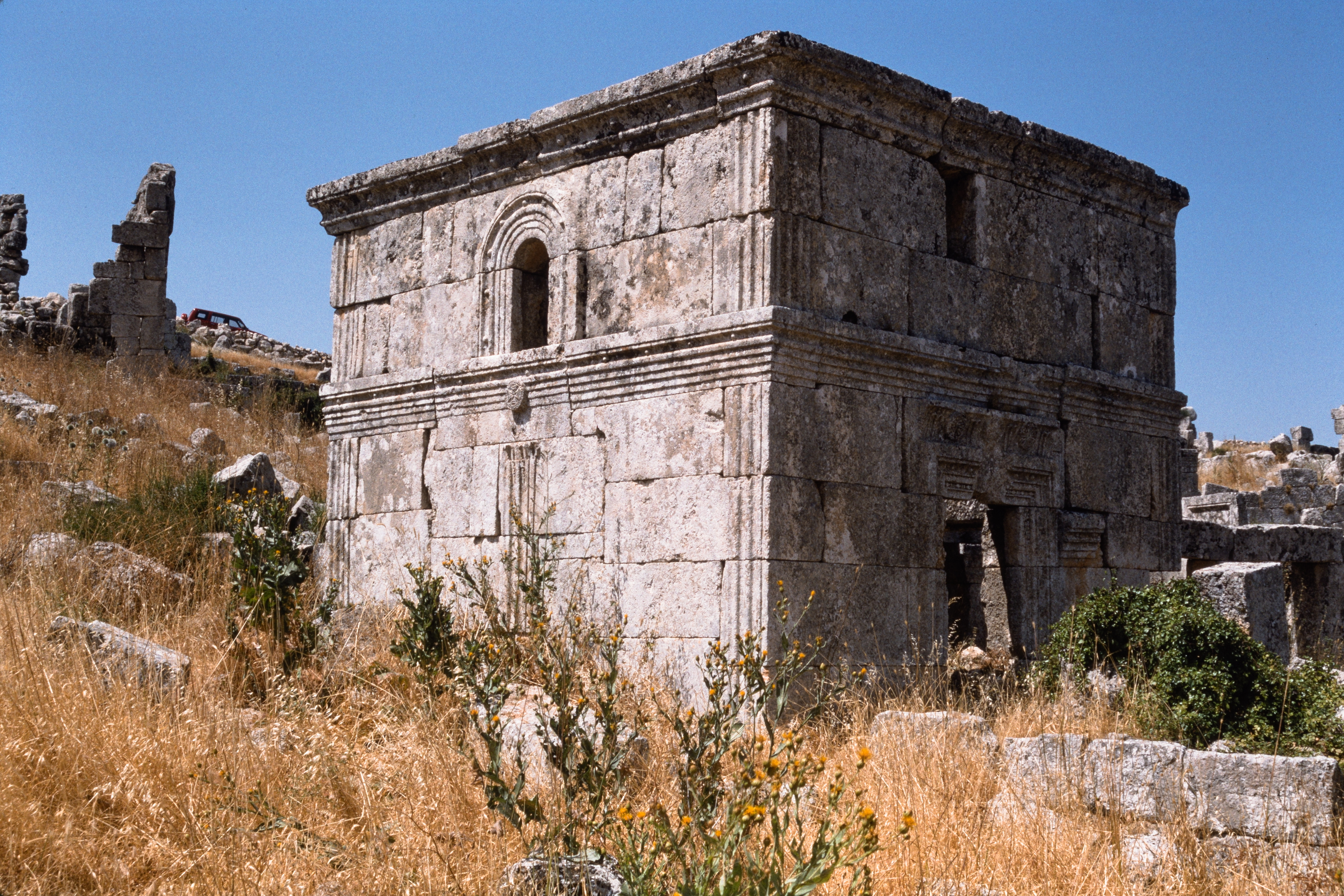
Western Church, Baqirha

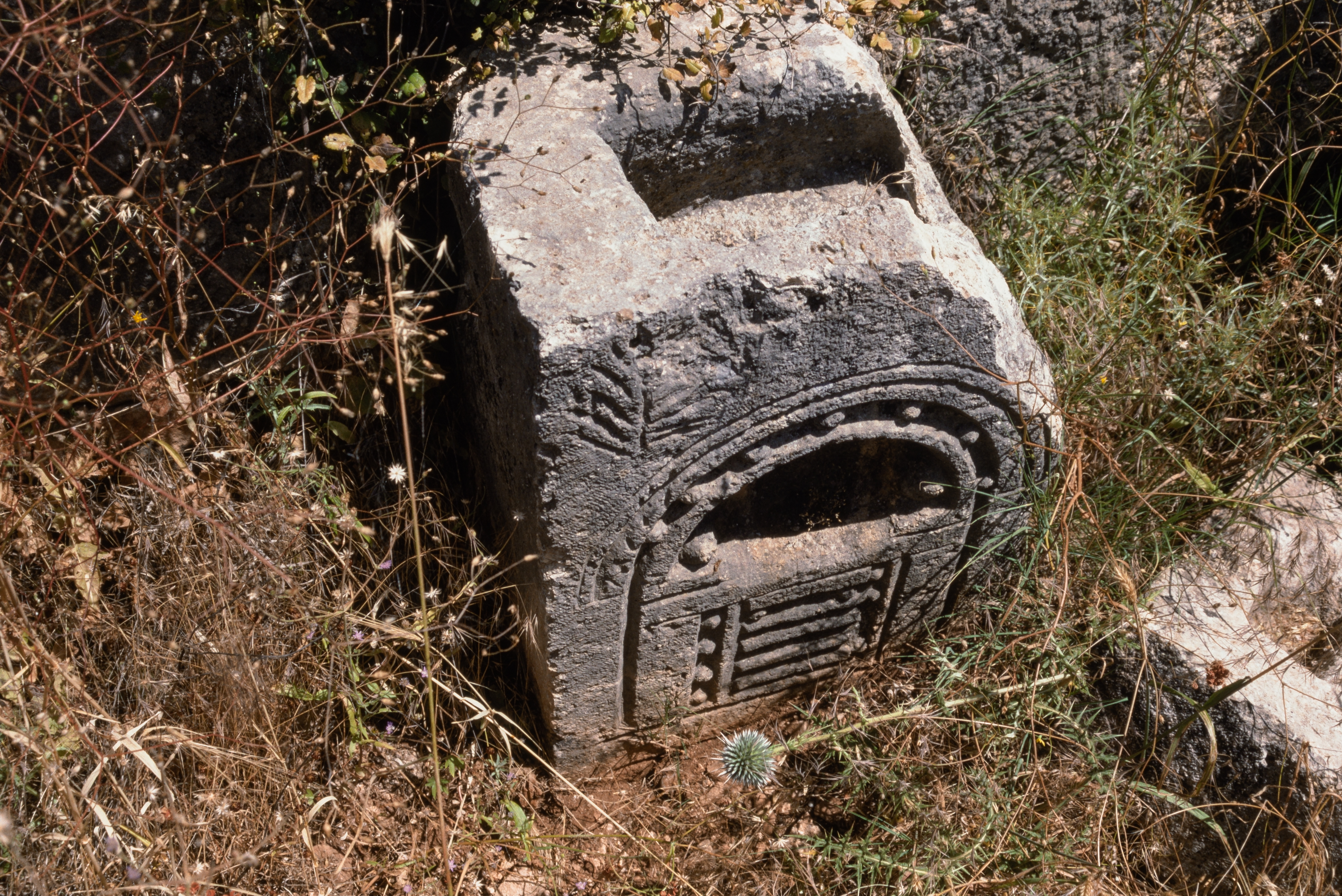
Western Church

The earlier and poorly preserved of the two churches is the West Church, which Butler said was built in 501. When dating, he relies on an inscription that was not on the church building, but above the northern entrance of the enclosure wall of the Temenos. There was probably a previous building which, according to Butler, dates from the 4th century. Strube dates this first building to 416. The date can be read on the dedication above the east of the two doors on the south side, i.e. the entrance for the male parishioners. There three names are mentioned: "Kyriakos Presbyteros", who was also an architect, "Mikalos Diakonos" and a "Krisianos". Above the western door that led to the rear women's area read: “There is one God and his Christ and the Holy Spirit. May he help those who fear him."

Only the foundations of the semicircular apse have been preserved from the older building. During the renovation, the apse on the east wall was converted into a rectangular extension, which corresponded to the local building tradition. This three-aisled building with a straight east wall and closed west wall resembled smaller village churches such as the unadorned monastery church of Sitt er-Rum. Blocks of the masonry are scattered around, the north and west walls are partially preserved, of the south wall only the lower layer has been preserved. The older columns in the nave had Ionic capitals, while the Corinthian and Tuscan capitals were probably from the second construction phase. The nave was supported by four columns per row. In accordance with the urban building tradition, bead-shaped relief bands ran over the arched windows on the outer walls, which rolled into volutes at the ends. For the first time in Christian architecture in Syria - should the construction time be around 500 - the outer walls were structured in the middle and at the corners by pilasters. The formation of the door reveal at the southern main entrance with a heavy bulge profile, braided band and leaf fans is in the tradition of the entrance door of the Basilica of Qalb Loze.

The inscribed date on the profiled portal of the surrounding wall, which is just as richly decorated with leaf motifs, can also be read as 491. The portal does not necessarily have to be built at the same time as the church was rebuilt, so the new church could have been built around 490 or later. Strube takes the date 501 for the renovation, when the entire east side was renewed.

The square baptistery a little away from the south-east corner of the church is much better preserved. It was integrated into a courtyard in front of the south side of the church, which was closed off from the outside by a wall. A pillar-supported colonnade ran inside on two sides of this wall.

=== Eastern Church ===
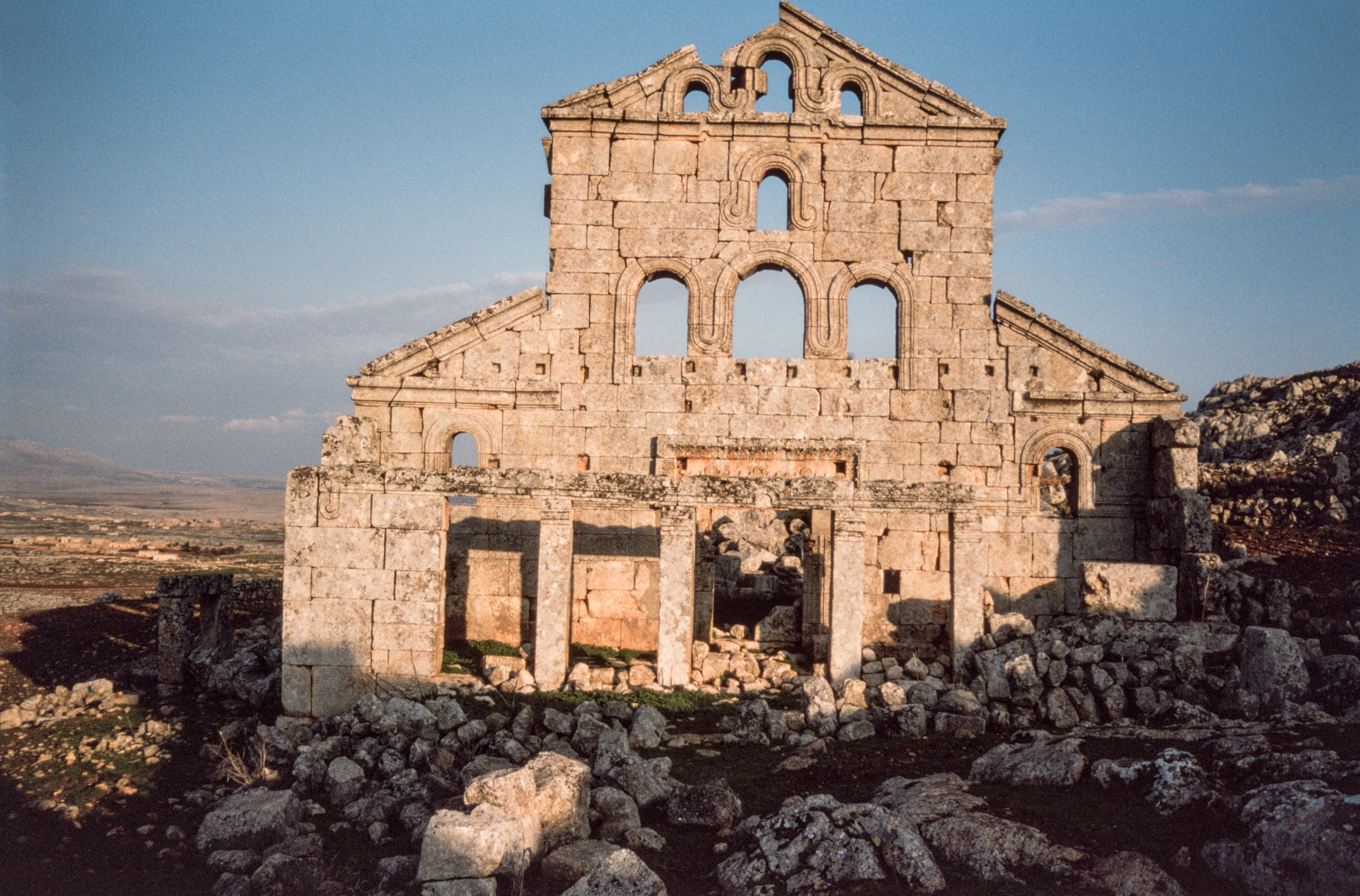
Eastern Church, Baqirha

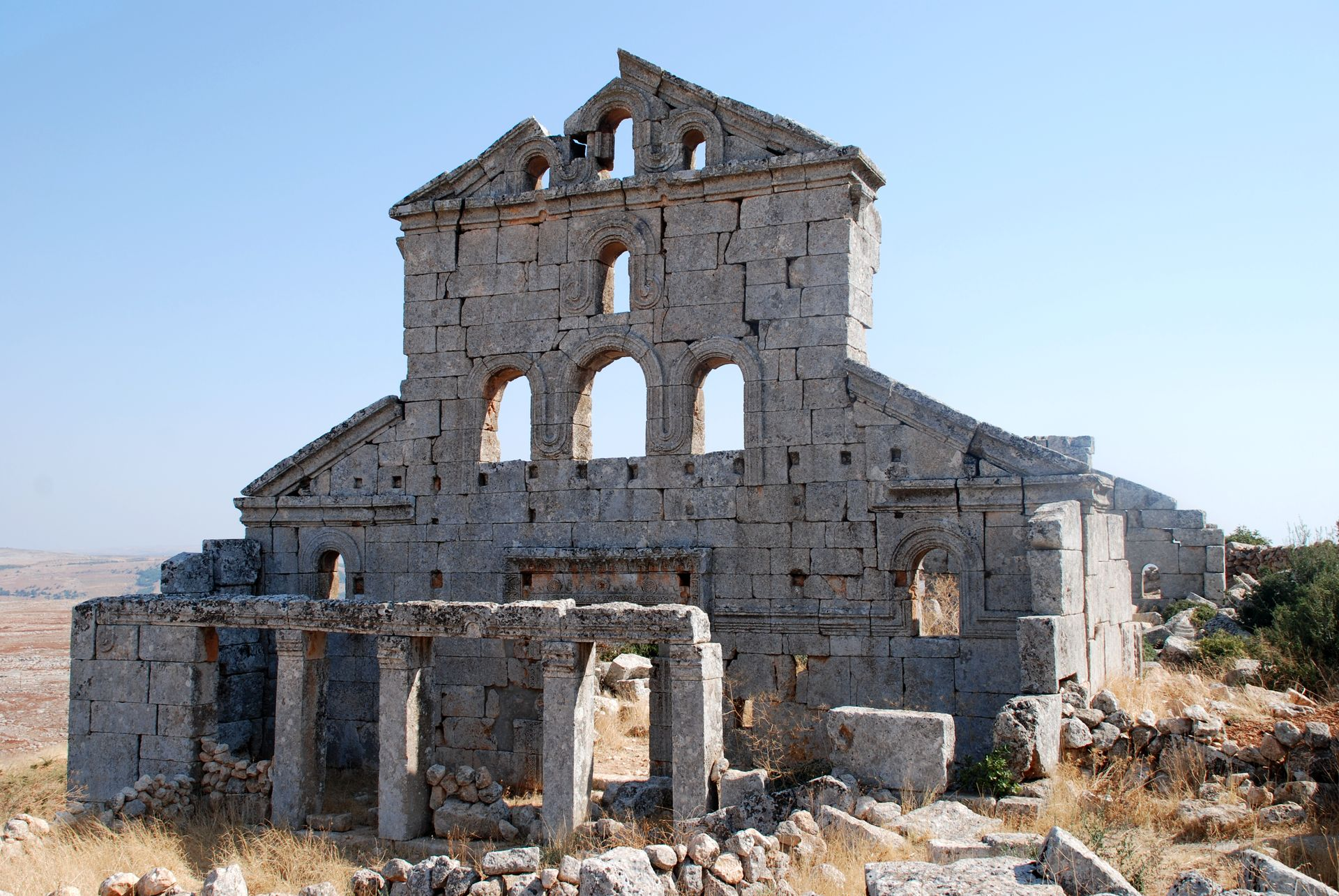
Eastern Church

The Eastern Church can be recognised from afar by its completely preserved west gable, which looks towards the street. It is about 100 meters below the temple. The dating of the last construction phase is discussed as well as the time when the first church was built at this location. An inscription on the lintel of the west portal refers to the year 546 AD, which corresponded to the year 595 of the era of Antioch, the capital of the then administrative district Antiochene. In this church, too, the question of the extent to which components from older churches were reused or whether a stylistic recourse to the construction forms of the famous architect Markianos Kyris (around 400) is difficult.

The east wall of the three-aisled pillar basilica has been preserved up to the cornice on the upper floor. Butler describes that the six columns per central nave wall fell on the floor as they did centuries ago. He visited the ruins briefly in 1900 and 1905, and in April 1909 he made a map of Dar Qita and Baqirha. In the grass-overgrown nave there are only remains of ashlar from the outer walls. The apse in the east was rectangular, and a vestibule with four pillars, closed side walls and a pent roof was attached to the west facade. Like the Sergius Church of Dar Qita, which was built at the same time, the west portal is based on the older style of Master Kyris. Beyer recognizes a reused older lintel to which an additional cornice was added during a renovation. Consequently, the entire church must have been rebuilt. This is also indicated by the small dimensions, which were particularly common in churches in the first half of the 5th century.

The narthex with a pent roof built on the southern long side had four pillars, while the otherwise similar extension of the Sergius Church was supported by four columns. It was definitely added later, perhaps around 600.

Like almost all places in the limestone massif, Baqirha achieved its prosperity mainly through the export of olive oil. The still upright pillar porticoes of some stately residences or trading houses bear witness to the urban character of the place.

=== Today ===
Since the beginning of the Syrian Civil War, the ruins of Baqirha have started to be used by displaced refugees from the conflict. The temples, churches and buildings of Baqirha are used by civilians seeking shelter within Idlib province.

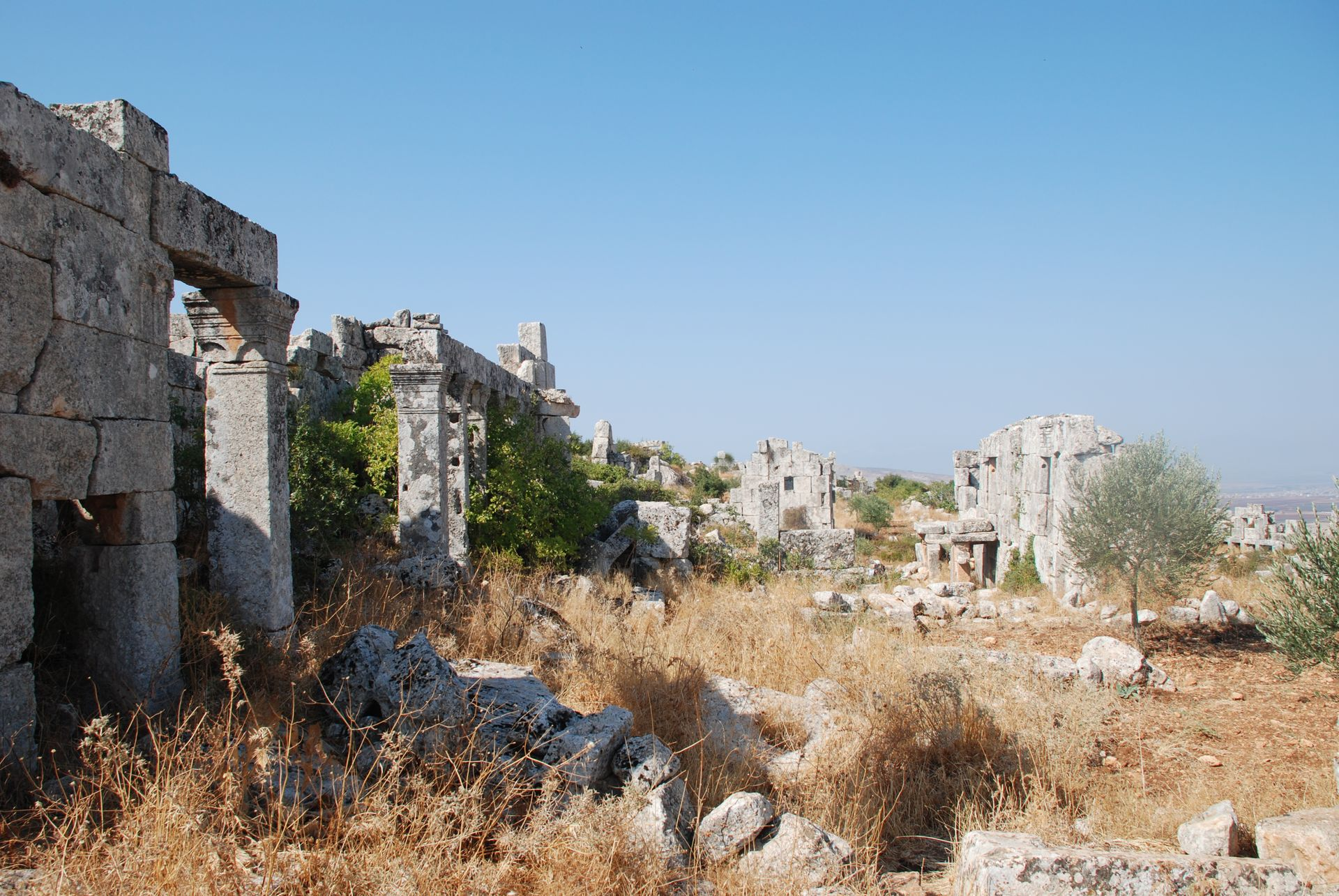

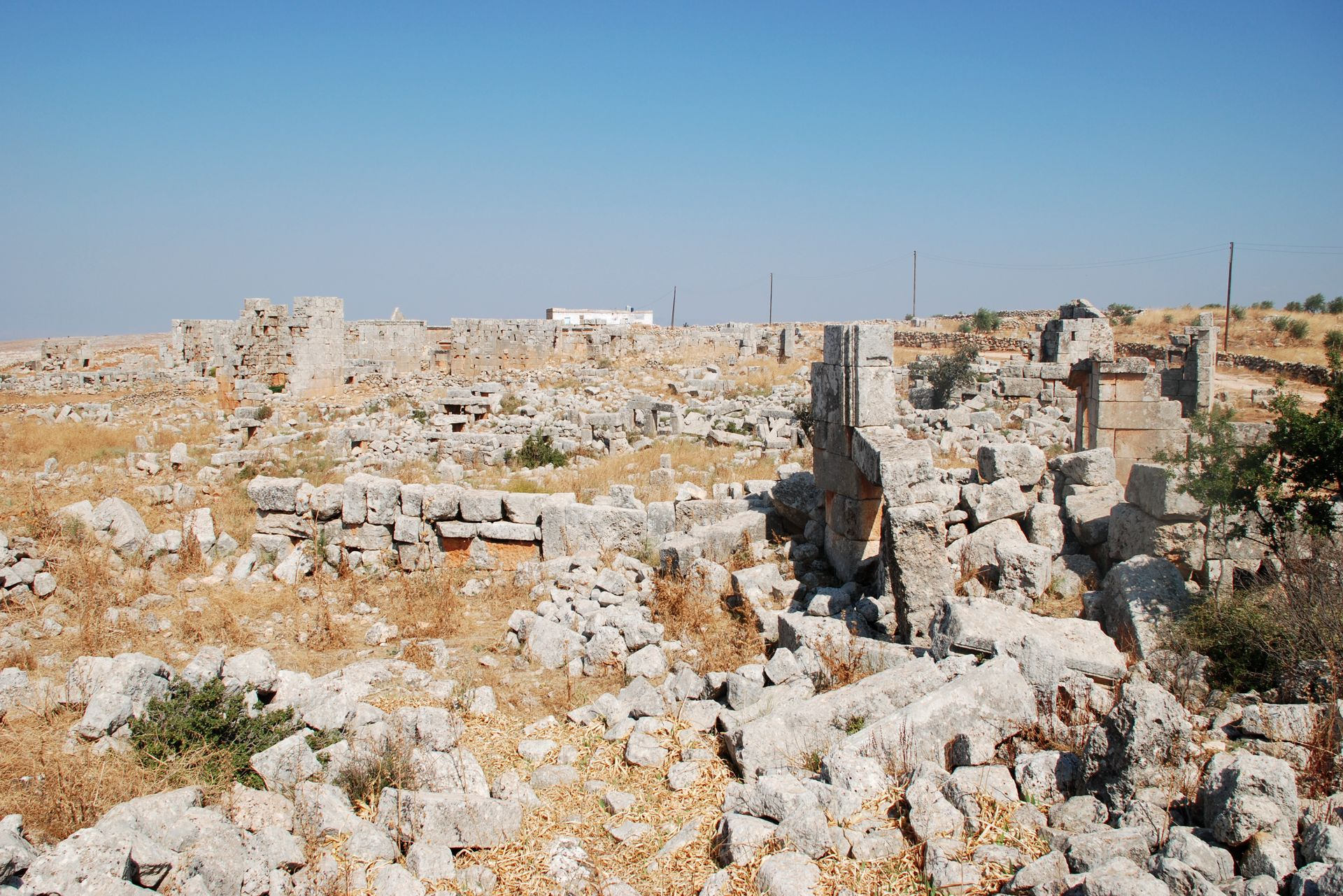

== Literature ==
- Christine Strube : The "Dead Cities". Town and country in northern Syria during late antiquity. Zabern's illustrated books on archeology. Verlag Philipp von Zabern, Mainz 1996, ISBN 3-8053-1840-5
- Christine Strube: Building decoration in the northern Syrian limestone massif. Vol. I. Forms of capitals, doors and cornices in the churches of the 4th and 5th centuries AD. Damascene research 5. Philipp von Zabern, Mainz 1993, pp. 77–79. ISBN 3-8053-1407-8
- Howard Crosby Butler: Early Churches in Syria. Fourth to Seventh Centuries. Princeton monographs in art and archeology. Princeton University Press, Princeton 1929; Reprint: Hakkert, Amsterdam 1969
- Hermann Wolfgang Beyer : The Syrian church building. Studies of late antique art history . Walter de Gruyter, Berlin 1925; Reprint: de Gruyter, Berlin 1978, ISBN 3-11-005705-0
