= Abu Humam al-Shami =

Syrian militant and military chief of al-Qaeda's Syrian affiliate al-Nusra Front

- Born: 1977 (age 48–49); Damascus, Syria
- Military career
- Allegiance: al-Qaeda
- Branch: al-Nusra Front (2012–2016); Hurras al-Din (2018–2025)
- Service years: 1998–present
- Rank: Military chief of al-Nusra Front; Leader of the Guardians of Religion Organization
- Conflicts: Syria: Syrian Civil War; Lebanon: Syrian Civil War spillover in Lebanon; Military intervention against ISIL: American-led intervention in Syria

Samir Abdel Latif Hijazi (Arabic: سمير عبد اللطيف حجازي), known as Abu Humam al-Shami (Arabic: أبو همام الشامي) or Faruq al-Suri (Arabic: فاروق السوري) (born 1977), is a Syrian militant and soldier who was the military chief of al-Qaeda's Syrian affiliate al-Nusra Front. He became the head of Hurras al-Din in February 2018, though he was replaced by Khalid al-Aruri.

== Early life ==
Abu Humam al-Shami (Arabic: أبو همام الشامي) is of Syrian origin. He traveled to Afghanistan between 1998 and 1999 and is believed to have spent a year at Al Ghuraba training camp, run by Abu Musab al-Suri. He attended al-Qaeda's Al Farouq training camp, where he finished second in his class. He was later made a trainer at Al Farouq training camp and afterwards he was appointed the emir over the region of the Kandahar Airport training camp by Saif al-Adel.

He pledged allegiance to Osama bin Laden, personally shaking his hand, and was placed in charge of Syrian jihadists in Afghanistan. He took part in al-Qaeda's battles at the time. He was appointed by Saeed al-Masri to work in Iraq prior to the fall of Baghdad in 2003. He stayed in Iraq "as an official representative of" al-Qaeda for four months prior to the Iraq War. During that time, he met with both Abu Musab al-Zarqawi and Abu Hamza al-Muhajir.

He was arrested by Iraqi intelligence and transferred to Syrian custody but he was quickly freed by the Syrians and resumed his work in Iraq. At the beginning of the Iraq War in 2003, he was appointed as the military head "of the mujahideen services office that was working in the benefit of the jihad in Iraq." Zarqawi “would send him men and he would train them militarily and [then] return them to” Iraq.

In 2005, he was subject to a series of arrests by the Syrian intelligence that forced him to flee to Lebanon. He then returned to Afghanistan. At some point he returned to the Levant under the orders of Atiyah Abd al-Rahman and in 2007 was arrested and imprisoned in Lebanon for five years. During this time he was held in the infamous Roumieh Prison.

== Syrian Civil War ==
He was released from prison in Lebanon in 2012 and immediately traveled to Syria to participate in the Syrian Civil War. He joined al-Nusra Front and became the group's overall military chief. In August 2016, it was reported on social media that al-Shami informed Nusra in letter he wouldn't join Jabhat Fateh al Sham.

=== Relations with ISIL ===
In 2014, al-Nusra was engaged in hostilities with rival jihadist faction, ISIL. Al-Shami was said to have spearheaded efforts in order to negotiate a ceasefire. He met with one of ISIL leader Abu Bakr al Baghdadi's chief deputies. Baghdadi's deputy supposedly told al-Shami that either ISIL will annihilate everyone else, or ISIL itself will be annihilated. When al-Shami suggested that their differences could be settled in a common sharia court, Baghdadi's deputy replied that they will bring their disagreements to a sharia court when the fight to the death is over.

The al-Nusra Front finally brokered a ceasefire with ISIL, when al-Shami met with Abu Omar al-Shishani, the Chechen ISIL commander. Before the deal could be ratified however, ISIL detonated a car bomb killing several top al-Nusra leaders. The bombing presumably brought the peace process to a halt.

== Reports of death ==
On 5 March 2015, Syrian state media claimed that al-Shami had been killed in a Syrian Army operation in the Idlib Province. However, other sources, including the SOHR, reported that al-Shami had been killed by a US-led Coalition airstrike. His death was never officially confirmed by the Pentagon or al-Nusra Front. Reports of al-Shami's death were undermined when he was added to the U.S. State Department's Rewards for Justice wanted list on 12 September 2019.

== See also ==
- List of fugitives from justice who disappeared
