= Sarmada =

Town in Idlib, Syria

Sarmada سرمدا
- Location in Syria
- Coordinates: 36°11′N 36°43′E
- Country: (Syrian opposition) Syria
- Governorate: Idlib
- District: Harem
- Subdistrict: al-Dana

Population (2007 est.)
  - Total: 15,000
- Time zone: UTC+2 (EET)
  - Summer (DST): UTC+3 (EEST)

Sarmada (Arabic: سرمدا) is a town in the Harem District, Idlib Governorate of Syria. It is in the extreme northwest of Syria near the border with Turkey.

A church was consecrated in Sarmada by Patriarch Elias of Antioch in 722 CE. It is also the place in which the Battle of Sarmada took place between the Principality of Antioch and the Artukids on June 28, 1119.

== Monuments ==
=== Column of Sarmada ===
The town is distinguished by the Roman tomb of Alexandras, dated to the second century CE. The tomb is rectangular and supports two columns, composed of thirteen cylicrical stones, joined together at the tenth cylinder by a horizontal piece with a further capital on top.

=== Monastery of Saint Daniel and Hisn ad-Dair ===
The Monastery of Saint Daniel (also known as Breij or Braij or al-Breij) is located 2 km west of the town, perched in a hillside location about 400 metres from the road. The monastery is dated to the 6th century CE during the later monastic phase of the Dead Cities.

A monastery called Hisn ad-Dair near Sarmada was given to Alan of Gael by Baldwin II of Jerusalem in 1121 AD, when it was described as a fortified monastery. There is also mention of a castle with three watchtowers in the area.

=== Roman temple ===
A further 4 km along the road towards Baqirha is a Roman temple dedicated to Zeus. Epigraphic evidence was found dating the structure to c. 169 CE. The temple features a massive gateway and cella along with one surviving column of what once was a four-columned portico.

== See also ==
- List of castles in Syria
