= Maksar al-Hisan =

Maksar al-Hisan مكسر الحصان
- Village
- Location in Syria
- Coordinates: 34°48′41″N 37°18′22″E
- Country: Syria
- Governorate: Homs
- District: Mukharram
- Subdistrict: Jubb al-Jarrah

Population (2004)
  - Total: 811
- Time zone: UTC+2 (EET)
  - Summer (DST): +3

Maksar al-Hisan (Arabic: مكسر الحصان) is a village in northern Syria located east of Homs in the Homs Governorate. According to the Syria Central Bureau of Statistics, Maksar al-Hisan had a population of 811 in the 2004 census. Its inhabitants are predominantly Alawites.
