= Kafr Shalaya =

Kafr Shalaya كفر شلايا
- Village
- Location in Syria
- Coordinates: 35°46′N 36°32′E
- Country: Syria
- Governorate: Idlib
- District: Ariha District
- Subdistrict: Ariha Nahiyah

Population (2004)
  - Total: 1,459
- Time zone: UTC+2 (EET)
  - Summer (DST): UTC+3 (EEST)
- City Qrya Pcode: C4289

Kafr Shalaya (Arabic: كفر شلايا) is a Syrian village located in Ariha Nahiyah in Ariha District, Idlib. According to the Syria Central Bureau of Statistics (CBS), Kafr Shalaya had a population of 1,459 in the 2004 census.
