= Bsanqul =

Bsanqul بسنقول
- Village
- Location in Syria
- Coordinates: 35°48′21″N 36°29′50″E
- Country: Syria
- Governorate: Idlib
- District: Ariha District
- Subdistrict: Muhambal Nahiyah

Population (2004)
  - Total: 2,883
- Time zone: UTC+2 (EET)
  - Summer (DST): UTC+3 (EEST)
- City Qrya Pcode: C4322

Bsanqul (Arabic: بسنقول) is a Syrian village located in Muhambal Nahiyah in Ariha District, Idlib. According to the Syria Central Bureau of Statistics (CBS), Bsanqul had a population of 2,883 in the 2004 census.
