= Abdullah Ramo Pazara =

- Born: Bosnia
- Died: 2014 (aged 37–38); Syria
- Occupation: truck driver
- Known for: alleged to have led jihadists in ISIL

Abdullah Ramo Pazara (died 2014) was a Bosnian-American who was suspected of an association with the Islamic State of Iraq and the Levant (ISIL).

Ramo Pazara (he added the forename "Abdullah" at some time shortly before his naturalization as a United States citizen in 2013) was born in a Bosnian Muslim family near Teslić, an area of Bosnia largely populated by Bosnian Serbs. He was a youth during the brutal Bosnian War which led to Bosnia's independence from Yugoslavia. Atlantic magazine described how the Vojska Republike Srpske, a Serbian militia, called upon non-Serbs to swear a loyalty oath to it. They reported some Bosnian sources claimed Pazara was enlisted, as a child soldier, and fought with the Serbian VRS, against his own people. They described his early life as "shattering", and that he seemed to have failed to adapt to peacetime civilian life.

Pazara was born in Bosnia, and became an American citizen. United States intelligence officials describe him becoming radicalized, after he became an American citizen, and then traveled to Syria in July 2013, and volunteered to fight for ISIS. The St Louis Post-Dispatch incorrectly reported that Pazara was not naturalized until 2014. He was, in fact, naturalized as a United States citizen on May 17, 2013, eleven days after swearing an oath of allegiance. They described how he may have died there, but not before rising to a command position, and leading six other American ISIS followers to transfer funds to ISIS. Ramiz Zijad Hodzic, Sedina Unkic Hodzic, Mediha Medy Salkicevic, Jasminka Ramic, Armin Harcevic, and Nihad Rosic, the six individuals described as his conspirators, all faced terrorism charges on February 7, 2015. All were all immigrants from Bosnia. In 2017, the six alleged co-conspirators who faced charges for helping to fund Pazara's activities in Syria filed a motion have their charges dropped, arguing he was a lawful combatant, fighting against Syria's Bashar al-Assad government, while enlisted with militia groups that operated with the support of the US.
