= Howard Crosby Butler =

American archaeologist (1872–1922)

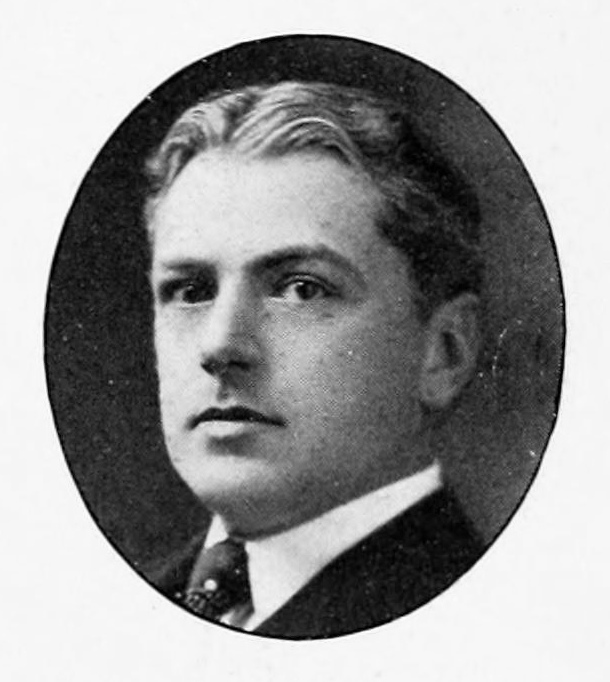
Howard Crosby Butler

Howard Crosby Butler (March 7, 1872 Croton Falls, New York – August 13, 1922 Neuilly) was an American archaeologist. Butler graduated from Princeton University, and later pursued special studies at the Columbia School of Architecture and at the American School of Classical Studies in Rome and in Athens. In 1899, 1904, and 1909, he was at the head of archaeological expeditions in Syria. He became professor of the history of architecture at Princeton in 1905. Turkey's unsolicited request that he oversee the excavation of Sardis represented a rare distinction for an American and a Christian. He directed five seasons of archaeological work at Sardis from 1910 to 1914, interrupted by the World War I. Most of the resulting finds kept in the excavation house perished in the Greco-Turkish War of 1919–22, thwarting the publication of projected volumes on pottery, lamps, bronze and stone objects, ivories, bones and glass. Butler became unwell on August 11, 1922, after returning from Sardis, via Naples. He was admitted to the American Hospital of Paris in Neuilly on August 13 and died that night.

== Works ==
He wrote many articles for archaeological journals and notable books on Scotland's Ruined Abbeys (1900) and The Story of Athens (1902). Expedition documents include “Architecture,” Part II of Publications of American Expedition to Syria (1903) and “Ancient Architecture in Syria,” in Division II of Publications of Princeton Expedition to Syria.

- Butler, H.C. (1904). Architecture and Other Arts. New York, London: The Century company, William Heinemann.
- Butler, H.C. (1907). Ancient Architecture in Syria: Sec. A, Southern Syria. Vol. 1. Leyden: Brill.
- Butler, H.C. (1907). Ancient Architecture in Syria: Sec. B, Northern Syria (Ala and Kasr ibn Wardan). Vol. 1 (Seeia). Leyden: Brill.
- Butler, H.C. (1916). Ancient Architecture in Syria: Sec. A, Southern Syria. Vol. 6 (Seeia). Leyden: Brill.
- Butler, H.C. (1922). Sardis: The Excavations, 1910–1914. Publications of the American Society for the Excavation of Sardis. Vol. I.1. Leyden: Brill.
- Butler, H.C. (1925). Sardis: Architecture: The Temple of Artemis. Publications of the American Society for the Excavation of Sardis. Vol. II.1. Leyden: Brill.
- Butler, H.C.; Littmann, E.; Prentice, William Kelly; Stoever, Edward Royal (1930). Syria, Publications: Divisions I-IV, by Princeton University Archaeological Expeditions to Syria, 1904-5 and 1909. Vol. 6 (Seeia). Leyden: Brill.
