= List of Syrian civil war barrel bomb attacks =

A barrel bomb is a type of improvised explosive device used extensively by the Syrian Air Force during the Syrian civil war. They are usually made from a barrel that has been filled with high explosives, along with shrapnel and/or oil. In Syria, they are typically dropped from a helicopter. Due to the large amount of explosives that can be packed into a barrel the resulting detonation can be devastating. The Syrian military often dropped these bombs in civilian areas leading to multiple civilian deaths. The BBC reported that between January 2014 and May 2015, only 1% of those killed by barrel bombs were rebel fighters. By the end of 2017, over 97% of barrel bomb deaths were civilians, and more than 25% were children. According to the UK-based Syrian Network for Human Rights, since the start of the war through to December 2017, at least 68,334 barrel bombs have been used.

Key:

- = chemical attack involved

== 2012 ==
- In August 2012, report of a barrel bomb being dropped on the Hamidiya neighborhood of Homs.
- In August 2012, report of barrel bombs being dropped on Al-Qusayr.
- In September 2012, a large number of people were killed and wounded when a barrel bomb was dropped on a residential district in Aleppo.

== 2013 ==
- In late August 2013, barrel bombs were dropped on at least two areas of Aleppo, including over a public park in Bab al-Nairab.
- On 8 October 2013, a barrel bomb was dropped on the village of Bizabur, Idlib, just south of Ariha.
- On 30 November 2013, a barrel bomb killed at least 26 people in al-Bab, Aleppo.
- On 1 December 2013, a barrel bomb killed at least 20 people in al-Bab, Aleppo.
- From 15–24 December 2013, barrel bombs killed more than 300 people (and as many as more than 650 according to the Syrian National Council) in several districts of Aleppo.
- On 26 December 2013, a barrel bomb killed at least 15 people in Azaz.
- On 29 December 2013, a barrel bomb killed at least 25 people in Aleppo.

== 2014 ==
=== January ===
- On 7 January 2014, barrel bombs killed an unspecified number of civilians in the Damascus suburb of Douma.
- On 12 January 2014, barrel bombs killed at least 15 people in Al-Bab, Aleppo.
- On 14 January 2014, barrel bombs killed an unspecified number of people in Darayya, Arbin and Zabadani.
- On 14 January 2014, a barrel bomb was dropped on the village of Inkhil in Deraa province.
- On 18 January 2014, barrel bombs killed at least 60 people in Aleppo.
- On 22 January 2014, barrel bombs were dropped in the central Hama province.
- On 24 January 2014, barrel bombs were dropped on Darayya.
- On 25 January 2014, barrel bombs killed 10 people when dropped on Aleppo's outlying industrial city and the Sheikh Najjar districts.
- On 28 January 2014, a barrel bomb killed 22 people in Aleppo.
- On 29 January 2014, barrel bombs killed at least 62 people in the Maadi and Salhin districts of south Aleppo.
- On 30 January 2014, barrel bombs killed at least 11 people in Darayya.

=== February ===
- From 1–5 February 2014, barrel bombs killed at least 246 people in Aleppo.
- On 8 February 2014, barrel bombs killed at least 20 people in Aleppo, and an unspecified number of people in Darayya.
- On 9 February 2014, barrel bombs killed at least 11 people in Aleppo.
- On 11 February 2014, barrel bombs killed at least 10 people in Aleppo.
- On 12 February 2014, barrel bombs killed at least 38 people in Aleppo, while 31 people were killed in Daraa - mostly by barrel bombs.
- On 16 February 2014, barrel bombs were dropped on Aleppo, Darayya, Khan al-Shih and several locations in rural Idlib.
- On 17 February 2014, a barrel bomb was dropped on Masaken Hanano, Aleppo.
- On 18 February 2014, barrel bombs were dropped in several parts of Syria, while a barrel bomb killed at least 18 people when dropped on the Palestinian refugee camp in Deraa.
- On 23 February 2014, barrel bombs killed at least 12 people in Aleppo.

=== March ===
- On 4 March 2014, barrel bombs were dropped on Yabroud.
- On 5 March 2014, barrel bombs killed a number of people in Aleppo, Yabroud and Daraya.
- On 6 March 2014, barrel bombs killed at least 13 people after being dropped on Aleppo and Yabroud.
- On 7 March 2014, barrel bombs killed a number of people in Yabroud.
- On 8 March 2014, barrel bombs destroyed many buildings including a mosque in Aleppo.
- On 9 March 2014, barrel bombs killed at least 8 people, including a Canadian freelance photographer, after being dropped on Aleppo.
- On 15 March 2014, barrel bombs killed at least 6 people after being dropped on Ras al-Maara and Yabroud.
- On 22 March 2014, barrel bombs were dropped on Naima, Daraa Governorate.
- On 24 March 2014, barrel bombs were dropped on Kesab and the Jebel Turkman.
- On 26 March 2014, barrel bombs killed 20 people and wounded 40 others in the Anadan region of Aleppo.
- On 27 March 2014, barrel bombs were dropped on Observatory 45, as well as Flitah, near the Lebanon border, where it killed 8 rebels.
- On 31 March 2014, barrel bombs killed at least 31 people after being dropped on the Aleppo town of Maaret al-Artiq.

=== April ===
- On 2 April 2014, barrel bombs killed at least 15 people after being dropped across the province of Aleppo and Deraa.
- On 4 April 2014, barrel bombs killed about 50 people after being dropped on the Dalati Mosque and Dar al-Shifa Hospital of the Shaar neighborhood of Aleppo during peak times.
- On 6 April 2014, barrel bombs caused much destruction in the Andana district of Aleppo.
- On 10 April 2014, barrel bombs killed at least 88 people in the northern neighborhood of Aleppo.
- On 11 April 2014, a barrel bomb, allegedly containing chemicals, was dropped on Kafr Zita: see 2014 Kafr Zita chemical attack.
- On 12 April 2014, barrel bombs killed at least 11 people in the Anadan and Hrytan region of Aleppo.
- On 20 April 2014, barrel bombs killed 59 people in Aleppo Province.
- On 22 April 2014, 38 barrel bombs were dropped on rebel-controlled east Aleppo neighborhoods.
- On 24 April 2014, barrel bombs killed at least 24 people when dropped on a vegetable market in Atareb, Aleppo.
- On 26 April 2014, a barrel bomb killed at least 6 people in the town of Sarmeen, Idlib, and at least 10 people in Lataminah, Hama.
- On 30 April 2014, barrel bombs killed at least 25 children, after being dropped on an elementary school in Aleppo.

=== May ===
- On 1 May 2014, barrel bombs killed at least 40 people in a busy market in Aleppo and a barrel bomb killed 1 Syrian refugee and wounded four others in the remote border village of Tfail in east Lebanon.
- On 10 May 2014, barrel bombs killed at least 46 people in eastern areas of Aleppo city.
- On 11 May 2014, opposition forces accused the government of contaminating a water supply in Aleppo after a barrel bomb struck a pumping station, one of two in the city.
- On 21 May, barrel bombs destroyed many houses and claimed many lives in the town of Maaret al-Artik, Aleppo.
- On 22 May, the Army had finally broken the siege of Aleppo prison after more than 100 barrel bombs were dropped during the final push to reach the prison.
- On 27 May 2014, barrel bombs killed at least 43 people in Aleppo.
- On 29 May 2014, barrel bombs claimed many lives in Darat Izza, Aleppo province.
- On 30 May 2014, barrel bombs killed at least 20 people in Aleppo's Bustan al-Qasr neighborhood.

=== June ===
- On 2 June 2014, barrel bombs killed at least 22 people in Aleppo.
- On 3 June 2014, barrel bombs injured people and damaged the Mosque of the Blacksmiths in Aleppo.
- On 4 June 2014, barrel bombs targeted Aleppo, the town of Khan al-Shih, south of Damascus, several areas of Idlib province, and Morek, in Hama province.
- On 5 June 2014, a mosque was hit by a barrel bomb at Qadi Askar district in Aleppo.
- On 8 June 2014, a barrel bomb killed at least 7 people in the neighborhood of Tariq al-Bab, Aleppo.
- On 14 June 2014, barrel bombs killed at least 8 people in Mayadin, Aleppo, 13 people in Anadan, Aleppo province, and destroyed a mosque in Aleppo.
- On 16 June 2014, barrel bombs killed at least 37 and up to 68 people in the Sukkari and Ashrafieh neighborhoods of Aleppo, and at least 3 people in a number of rural areas of Deraa province.
- On 18 June 2014, barrel bombs killed at least 20 and injured at least 80 people, many seriously, in the refugee camp in the village of Shajra, 2 km (1 mile) from the Jordanian border.
- On 21 June 2014, barrel bombs killed at least 11 people near the Ghouta district of Damascus.
- On 22 June 2014, barrel bombs killed at least 9 people in the neighborhoods of Halak and Bab al-Nasr in Aleppo.
- On 26 June 2014, barrel bombs killed as many as 49 people in areas in Aleppo and Hama province.

=== July ===
- On 6 July 2014, barrel bombs killed 8 members of a single family in Da'el, Deraa province.
- On 6 July 2014, barrel bombs on the al-Shaar neighborhood on July 9 killed approximately 20 civilians.
- On 11 July 2014, barrel bombs killed at least 20 people in Aleppo.
- On 16 and 17 July 2014, barrel bombs were dropped on the central town of Morek.
- On 21 July 2014, barrel bombs killed at least 10 people in Al-Ansari neighborhood of Aleppo.
- On 28 July 2014, barrel bombs killed at least 9 people in the Shaar district of Aleppo.

=== August ===
- On 3 August 2014, barrel bombs killed at least 23 people in the Jabal al Akrad, Jisr al-Shughur and Najia districts of Idlib.
- On 9 August 2014, barrel bombs killed at least 30 people and destroyed a mosque in the Maadi neighborhood of Aleppo.
- On 10 August 2014, barrel bombs killed at least 24 people in Hama and Raqqa.
- On 11 August 2014, barrel bombs killed at least 25 people in several districts of Aleppo and cut off water and electricity supplies.
- On 13 August 2014, barrel bombs killed at least 17 people in the Bab al-Nairab district and al-Shaar area of Aleppo.
- On 14 August 2014, barrel bombs killed at least 6 people in the Maadi neighborhood of Aleppo.
- On 15 August 2014, barrel bombs killed at least 10 people in Aleppo and 14 people in Rastan.
- On 22 August 2014, barrel bombs killed at least 20 people in Aleppo.
- On 24 August 2014, barrel bombs killed at least 5 children in three villages in Daraa province.
- On 30 August 2014, barrel bombs killed at least 5 people from the same family in the Hamra district of Aleppo.
- On 31 August 2014, barrel bombs killed at least 42 children across Syria.

=== September ===
- On 5 September 2014, barrel bombs killed at least 15 people in the Haidariyeh district of Aleppo.
- On 8 September 2014, barrel bombs killed at least 7 people in the town of Tebet al-Imam near Hama.
- On 15 September 2014, barrel bombs killed at least 15 people in Talbiseh.
- On 18 September 2014, barrel bombs killed at least 15 people in Al-Bab.
- On 20 September 2014, barrel bombs killed at least 8 people in the Arad Hamra, Al Haidarieh and Masakn Hanano districts of Aleppo.
- On 26 September 2014, barrel bombs killed at least 5 people in al-Rastan and 9 people east of Aleppo.

=== October ===
- On 1 October 2014, barrel bombs killed at least 23 people in Aleppo.
- On 10 October 2014, barrel bombs killed at least 19 people in Daraa.
- On 12 October 2014, barrel bombs killed at least 12 people in Binnish.
- On 19 October 2014, barrel bombs killed at least 7 members of one family in the village of Sousan in northern Aleppo.
- On 23 October 2014, barrel bombs killed at least 10 people in Daraa, and 15 people in the village of Tal Qarrah in the north of Aleppo.
- On 26 October 2014, barrel bombs killed at least 12 civilians from the same family in the town of Busra al-Sham in Daraa province.
- On 29 October 2014, barrel bombs killed as many as 75 civilians when dropped on the Abedin displaced persons camp in Idlib.
- On 31 October 2014, barrel bombs killed at least 4 people in Rastan district in Homs.

=== November ===
- On 6 November 2014, barrel bombs killed at least 12 people in the Shaar neighbourhood of Aleppo.
- On 9 November 2014, barrel bombs killed at least 21 people in Al-Bab.
- On 13 November 2014, barrel bombs killed at least 20 people in a primary school in Ras al-Ayn, al-Hasakah Governorate.
- On 17 November 2014, barrel bombs killed at least 14 people near a bakery and a restaurant in Al-Bab.
- On 18 November 2014, barrel bombs killed at least 14 people in Qabr al-Inglizi, near the villages of Huraytan and Kafr Hamrah.
- On 28 November 2014, barrel bombs killed at least 20 people in Daraa Governorate.
- On 30 November 2014, barrel bombs killed at least 12 people in Jasim, Daraa Governorate.

=== December ===
Notably, on 28 November 2014, a huge explosion occurred at the Syrian military airbase outside Hama. This was attributed to the complete destruction of the entire barrel-bomb making building on the airfield.

- On 23 December 2014, barrel bombs killed at least 7 people in Safuhin, Maarrat al-Nu'man District, Idlib Governorate.
- From 21–26 December 2014, according to the Syrian Observatory for Human Rights, the Syrian government dropped 193 barrel bombs across Syria.
- On 25 December 2014, barrel bombs killed about 40 people in al-Bab and Qabaseen, near Aleppo.

== 2015 ==
=== January ===
In late January, the Syrian air force stepped up its daily airstrikes, including hundreds of barrel bombs, after poor weather conditions earlier in the month restricted its movements.

- On 14 January 2015, barrel bombs killed 2 people and wounded 10 others in Kafr Zita.
- On 20 January 2015, barrel bombs killed at least 65 people and wounded 150 others in a market in Al-Hasakah.
- On 21 January 2015, barrel bombs killed at least 13 people in Houla.
- On 22 January 2015, a barrel bomb killed 2 girls in the village of Haziran, Idlib Governorate.
- On 23 January 2015, barrel bombs killed at least 42 people in the village of Hamoriyah, eastern Ghouta, and at least 4 people in Houla, when residents started to leave the mosques after Friday prayers.
- On 28 January 2015, barrel bombs killed at least 8 people and wounded tens of others in Kansafra and al-Bara villages in the Zawiya Mountain area of Idlib Governorate.
- On 29 January 2015, barrel bombs killed at least 6 children and wounded 15 others, along with killing more than 100 animals, when dropped on the tents of Bedouins in Hama.

=== February ===
- On 1 February 2015, barrel bombs killed at least 1 person in Kafr Naha town, Aleppo Governorate, while 30 barrel bombs were dropped on Al-Zabadani, the Khan Al-Sheikh Palestinian refugee camp and Assal al-Ward.
- On 2 February 2015, barrel bombs killed at least 7 people in Aleppo and 17 people in Khan Shaykhun.
- On 5 February 2015, barrel bombs killed at least 47 people in a crowded square in the Baidin neighborhood of Aleppo.
- From 9–10 February 2015, barrel bombs killed at least 18 people in Douma, Syria.
- On 21 February 2015, barrel bombs killed at least 8 people in Aleppo, while it was reported that a barrel bomb containing a noxious gas had been dropped on Hayan, northwest of Aleppo, severely injuring 3 people who inhaled the gas.

=== March ===
- On 5 March 2015, a barrel bomb killed at least 22 people in a public square in the Qadi Askar neighborhood of Aleppo.
- On 9 March 2015, barrel bombs, including ones alleged to contain chlorine gas, killed at least 7 people in the village of Mzeireb, Daraa Governorate.
- On 10 March 2015, barrel bombs killed at least 8 people near Homs.
- On 12 March 2015, barrel bombs killed at least 6 people in the village of Alma, Daraa Governorate.
- On 16 March 2015, chlorine-filled barrel bombs killed at least 6 people and hospitalised about 70 more in the town of Sarmin.
- On 23 March 2015, a barrel bomb killed at least killed 5 children from the same family in Tafas.
- On 24 March 2015, chlorine-filled barrel bombs wounded about 30 people in the village of Binnish.
- On 26 March 2015, barrel bombs killed at least 22 people, with many of the wounded in critical condition, in Deraa al-Balad, in the city of Daraa.

=== April ===
- On 1 April 2015, barrel bombs killed at least 7 people in Da'el, 5 people in the village of Ghanto, Homs Governorate, and 4 people in the Firdous neighborhood of Aleppo.
- On 3 April 2015, a barrel bomb killed at least 10 people in the Firdous neighborhood of Aleppo.
- From 4–8 April 2015, more than 30 barrel bombs have been dropped on the Palestinian refugee Yarmouk Camp, including on the only functioning hospital inside Yarmouk.
- On 6 April 2015, a barrel bomb killed at least 7 people in Bosra.
- On 12 April 2015, a barrel bomb killed at least 9 people in Aleppo.
- On 14 April 2015, barrel bombs killed at least 12 people at a shelter in Saraqeb and 10 people in Daraa Governorate.
- On 16 April 2015, 4 chemical barrel bombs were dropped near Sarmin and Korin villages, Idlib Governorate, suffocating 20 people, who were then taken to field hospitals for treatment.
- On 19 April 2015, a barrel bomb killed at least 6 people in Al-Karak al-Sharqi, Daraa Governorate.
- On 29 April 2015, a barrel bomb killed at least 5 people in the al-Fardous neighbourhood of Aleppo.

=== May ===
- On 1 May 2015, barrel bombs filled with chlorine-gas killed 1 child and injured about 40 people in Saraqib.
- On 3 May 2015, a barrel bomb killed at least 10 people near a school in the Seif al-Dawla neighborhood of Aleppo.
- On 5 May 2015, a barrel bomb killed at least 9 people in the village of Shawka in eastern Hama Governorate.
- On 12 May 2015, barrel bombs killed at least 47 people at a minibus stop in the Jisr al-Haj area of Aleppo.
- On 15 May 2015, a barrel bomb filled with chlorine-gas left 19 people experiencing respiratory problems in Mishmishan village, Idlib Governorate.
- On 15 May 2015, a barrel bomb killed at least 40 people (with estimates as high as 100) at a bakery in Manbij.
- On 20 May 2015, a barrel bomb killed at least 7 people in the Qadi Askar district of Aleppo.
- On 22 May 2015, barrel bombs killed at least 11 women and girls in Aleppo Province.
- On 23 May 2015, a barrel bomb killed at least 14 people, mostly children, and injured dozens in the al-Hamidia neighborhood of Deir ez-Zor.
- On 30 May 2015, barrel bombs killed at least 84 people in Al-Bab and the Shaar neighbourhood of Aleppo.
- On 31 May 2015, barrel bombs killed at least 3 people in Al-Bab.

=== June ===
- On 2 June 2015, barrel bombs killed at least 18 people in Tell Rifaat, 11 people in Jubb al-Qubbeh in east Aleppo, and 8 members of one family in Kafr Sijna in Idlib Governorate.
- On 4 June 2015, barrel bombs killed at least 20 people in Aleppo Governorate.
- On 6 June 2015, barrel bombs killed at least 10 people in Tell Rifaat.
- On 7 June 2015, barrel bombs killed at least 17 people in the town of Al-Zaafarana, Homs Governorate.
- On 8 June 2015, a barrel bomb killed at least 4 people in Tell Rifaat.
- On 9 June 2015, barrel bombs killed at least 20 people and injured around 40 more in Aleppo.
- On 17 June 2015, barrel bombs killed at least 36 people in Douma.
- On 19 June 2015, a barrel bomb killed at least 5 people and injured 15 others in the Maadi neighbourhood of Aleppo.
- On 21 June 2015, barrel bombs killed at least 14 people and injured 20 others in two neighborhoods of Aleppo, in an increase in such attacks since the beginning of Ramadan.
- On 22 June 2015, a barrel bomb killed at least 10 people in a mosque during evening prayers in the district of Ansari, Aleppo.
- On 24 June 2015, barrel bombs killed at least 7 people in the town of Jarjanaz, Idlib Governorate.
- On 27 June 2015, a barrel bomb killed at least 13 people, including a family of nine, and injured dozens in Daraa.
- On 28 June 2015, barrel bombs killed at least 7 people in Aleppo.
- On 30 June 2015, barrel bombs killed at least 15 people in the neighborhood of Salihin, Aleppo, at least 10 people in the Jabal al-Zawiya area, and at least 10 people in Douma. Overall, at least 80 people were injured.

=== July ===
- On 1 July 2015, barrel bombs killed at least 15 people and injured at least 25 in al-Salihiya district of Aleppo, and killed 5 people in Tafas.
- On 8 July 2015, a barrel bomb killed at least 15 people, during iftar, in the neighbourhood of Karam al-Beik, Aleppo.
- On 11 July 2015, barrel bombs killed at least 28 people in Aleppo and 7 people from one family, during iftar, in Al-Harra.
- On 13 July 2015, barrel bombs killed at least 35 people and injured at least 50 in Al-Bab.
- On 15 July 2015, barrel bombs killed at least 5 people in the village of Taduf, northeast Aleppo Governorate.
- On 16 July 2015, barrel bombs killed at least 11 people in Al-Bab.
- On 17 July 2015, barrel bombs killed at least 11 people and injured 20 others in Urum al-Jawz.
- On 18 July 2015, barrel bombs killed at least 5 people in Aysheh village, near Al-Bab, and 28 barrel bombs were dropped in the Zabadani area.
- On 20 July 2015, barrel bombs killed at least 3 people and injured 35 in the Arbil district of Damascus.
- On 22 July 2015, barrel bombs killed at least 18 people in Al-Bureij, near Al-Bab.
- On 23 July 2015, a barrel bomb killed at least 13 people in the West Ghariya area of Daraa Governorate.

=== August ===
- On 8 August 2015, a barrel bomb killed at least 5 people in the Eriah district of Idlib.
- On 9 August 2015, barrel bombs killed at least 10 people in Al-Qaryatayn.
- On 11 August 2015, barrel bombs containing napalm were dropped on Darayya.
- On 13 August 2015, barrel bombs killed at least 13 people in Kafar Awwayed in the Idlib countryside.
- On 16 August 2015, barrel bombs were used in the deadly Douma market air strikes.
- On 22 August 2015, barrel bombs killed at least 50 people and injured at least 100 in Douma.
- On 24 August 2015, barrel bombs killed at least 9 people in Douma and 14 in al-Bara, with dozens more injured.

=== September ===
- On 6 September 2015, a barrel bomb killed at least 3 people and injured dozens in Ariha.
- On 16 September 2015, barrel bombs killed at least 45 people in the al-Mashhad neighborhood of Aleppo.
- On 17 September 2015, barrel bombs killed at least 21 people in Bosra.
- On 26 September 2015, barrel bombs killed at least 5 people in Taftanaz.

=== October ===
- On 2 October 2015, barrel bombs killed at least 100 people in Aleppo.
- On 4 and 6 October 2015, barrel bombs were dropped on a school run by the UNRWA for Palestinian refugees, as well as other areas, in Yarmouk Camp.
- On 19 October 2015, barrel bombs injured at least 5 people in Moadamiyeh, near Damascus.
- On 27 October 2015, barrel bombs killed at least 1 woman in Darayya.

=== November ===
- On 9 November 2015, barrel bombs killed at least 1 person in Darayya.
- On 19 November 2015, barrel bombs killed at least 25 farmers in Al-Shaykh Maskin.
- On 28 November 2015, barrel bombs killed at least 7 people and injured 47 in a hospital in Zafarana, a town in northern Homs.
- On 29 November 2015, 50 barrel bombs were dropped on Darayya alone.

=== December ===
- On 23 December 2015, more than 40 barrel bombs were dropped on the town of Muadamiyat al-Sham and its surrounding areas, including ones containing an unidentified toxic gas, killing at least 5 people.
- On 29 December 2015, a barrel bomb killed at least 20 people in Al-Ghantu.

== 2016 ==
=== January ===
- On 12 January 2016, 26 barrel bombs were dropped on Darayya.
- During January, 1,428 barrel bombs were dropped—1,123 of them were dropped in rural areas of Damascus.

=== February ===
- On 4 February 2016, barrel bombs were dropped on a hospital in Al-Ghariya al-Gharbiya, a town ten kilometers northeast of Daraa.
- On 18 February 2016, a barrel bomb struck a hospital, supported by Doctors Without Borders, in East Ghouta.
- From 24–25 February 2016, over a 24-hour period, at least 50 barrel bombs were dropped on Darayya; on 26 February 2016, dozens more barrel bombs were dropped on Darayya.
- On 28 February 2016, 5 barrel bombs were dropped on the village of Najiya and an unspecified number dropped on the nearby village of Kinda, Idlib province.

=== April ===
- On 10 April 2016, a barrel bomb injured a family of 7 people in the Haidariyeh district of Aleppo.
- On 24 April 2016, a barrel bomb killed at least 7 people in a market in the Al-Sakhour district of Aleppo.
- On 27 April 2016, barrel bombs killed at least 50 people in and around a hospital in Aleppo.

=== May ===
- On 2 May 2016, barrel bombs killed at least 3 people in Kafr Hamrah.
- On 5 May 2016, a barrel bomb killed scores of people in al-Khalidiya, near Khan Tuman.
- On 19 May 2016, barrel bombs killed at least 11 people in Houla.
- On 20 May 2016, barrel bombs killed at least 7 people and injured 32 in Khan al-Asal and Anadan.
- On 27 May 2016, barrel bombs killed at least 4 people in an eastern district of Aleppo.

=== June ===
- On 5 June 2016, a barrel bomb killed at least 9 people in the Qaterji neighbourhood of Aleppo.
- On 8 June 2016, barrel bombs killed at least 15 people and injured 20 when dropped on an area containing a hospital and marketplace in the Shaar neighbourhood of Aleppo.
- On 17 June 2016, barrel bombs killed at least 15 people and injured dozens when dropped on the Katirci and Tarik el-Bab neighbourhoods of Aleppo.
- On 19 June 2016, barrel bombs killed at least 10 people and injured 35 when dropped on Raqqa.

=== July ===
- On 11 July 2016, a barrel bomb killed 1 person in Al-Jalloum neighbourhood of Aleppo.
- On 23 July 2016, barrel bombs killed 2 people in northern Aleppo city.
- On 25 July 2016, barrel bombs killed at least 24 people in Al-Mashhad neighbourhood of Aleppo, and dozens were dropped on Douma.
- On 26 July 2016, barrel bombs killed at least 6 people in Aleppo.

=== August ===
- On 1 August 2016, barrel bombs containing chlorine gas asphyxiated at least 33 people in Saraqib.
- On 10 August 2016, barrel bombs containing a gas, likely chlorine, killed at least 4 people and injured 55 in the Seif al Dawla and Zubdiya neighbourhoods of Aleppo.
- On 19 August 2016, barrel bombs destroyed the only hospital in Darayya.
- On 20 August 2016, a barrel bomb killed a mother and her 6 children in al-Jaloum district of Aleppo.
- On 25 August 2016, a barrel bomb killed at least 15 people from the same family and injured 18 in Bab al-Nairab, Aleppo.
- On 27 August 2016, barrel bombs killed at least 25 people when hitting a funeral procession (for victims of the 25 August barrel bomb attacks) and the rescue workers that followed in Bab al-Nairab.

=== September ===
- On 4 September 2016, barrel bombs killed at least 3 people and injured 20 in Aleppo.
- On 6 September 2016, a barrel bomb containing chlorine gas killed at least 2 people and injured at least 120 in the al-Sukkari district of Aleppo.
- On 7 September 2016, barrel bombs killed at least 20 people in the al-Sukkari district of Aleppo.
- On 10 September 2016, barrel bombs killed at least 10 people in Aleppo.
- On 18 September 2016, barrel bombs killed at least 10 people and injured many in Da'el.
- On 21 September 2016, barrel bombs killed at least 4 people and injured 11 in the Al-Sukkari neighborhood Aleppo.
- On 25 September 2016, barrel bombs killed at least 6 children in Aleppo.

=== October ===
- On 1 October 2016, barrel bombs struck the largest hospital in rebel-held Aleppo.
- Between 4–9 October 2016, more than 50 barrel bombs struck in and around the outskirts of the Palestinian refugee camp Khan al-Shih.
- On 5 October 2016, a barrel bomb destroyed a Syrian Civil Defense center in Damascus, with some volunteers injured.
- On 25 October 2016, barrel bombs killed at least 2 and wounded 5 opposition fighters in a village near Akhtarin.

=== November ===
- On 14 November 2016, over 15 barrel bombs containing chlorine gas targeted Khan al-Shih refugee camp.
- On 15 November 2016, barrel bombs killed at least 1 person and wounded 5 in Aleppo.
- On 16 November 2016, barrel bombs damaged the children's hospital and the only blood bank in besieged eastern Aleppo.
- On 17 November 2016, a barrel bomb damaged the Bab al-Nairab water plant.
- On 20 November 2016, a barrel bomb laced with chlorine gas suffocated to death a family of 4 children and their parents in the Sakhour district of Aleppo.
- On 24 November 2016, a barrel bomb killed at least 1 person in Bab al-Nairab.
- On 29 November 2016, a barrel bomb killed at least 25 people in Aleppo.

=== December ===
- On 4 December 2016, a barrel bomb killed at least 6 members of the same family, including 4 children, in Al-Tamanah.
- On 5 December 2016, a barrel bomb killed at least 4 people in Zabadiyeh district, Aleppo.
- On 9 December 2016, a barrel bomb killed at least 4 members of one family in Aleppo.
- On 26 December 2016, barrel bombs killed at least 14 people and injured dozens in Wadi Barada, a town northwest of Damascus.

== 2017 ==
=== January ===
- On 5 January 2017, a barrel bomb suffocated some civilians in Wadi Barada, northwest of Damascus.

=== February ===
- On 16 February 2017, barrel bombs killed a woman and three of her children and severely wounded 7 others in Hbit.

=== March ===
- On 25 March 2017, barrel bombs containing a chemical agent dropped on a surgical hospital killed one of the hospital's doctors and another person in Al-Lataminah.

=== April ===
- Between 7–11 April 2017, 125 barrel bombs were dropped in Daraa, 23 in Hama, four in Idlib and five apiece in Aleppo and Homs.
- On 30 April 2017, barrel bombs killed at least 11 people in Daraa.

=== May ===
- On 6 May 2017, at least 10 barrel bombs were dropped on Al-Lataminah and its surroundings.
- On 24 May 2017, at least 9 barrel bombs were dropped on Daraa.

=== June ===
- On 4 June 2017, at least 37 barrel bombs were dropped on Daraa.
- On 15 June 2017, a barrel bomb killed at least 1 person and injured 11 in Daraa.
- On 20 June 2017, at least 38 barrel bombs were dropped on Daraa.

=== July ===
In July 2017, at least 244 barrel bombs were dropped in Syria, mostly in Daraa Governorate and other de-escalation zones.

=== August ===
In August 2017, at least 92 barrel bombs were dropped in Syria, mostly in Hama Governorate, followed by Damascus and then Homs Governorate.

=== September ===
- From 19–27 September 2017, at least 13 barrel bombs were dropped on Idlib Governorate.
- In September 2017, at least 216 barrel bombs were dropped in Syria, mostly in Damascus, followed by Hama Governorate, and then Deir ez-Zor Governorate.

=== October ===
- In October 2017, at least 534 barrel bombs were dropped in Syria, 20% of them in Deir ez-Zor Governorate.

=== November ===
- On 16 November 2017, barrel bombs containing a chemical agent injured at least 3 people near Mazraat Beit Jinn.
- In November 2017, at least 613 barrel bombs were dropped in Syria, almost 86% of them in Damascus, followed by Deir ez-Zor Governorate and then Hama Governorate.

=== December ===
- On 28 December 2017, a barrel bomb killed 1 woman and injured 3 children at a primary health care centre in Maarrat al-Numan.
- In December 2017, at least 312 barrel bombs were dropped in Syria, mostly in Idlib Governorate and then Hama Governorate.

== 2018 ==
=== January ===
- In January 2018, at least 427 barrel bombs were dropped in Syria.

=== February ===
- On 3 February 2018, a barrel bomb killed at least 9 people in Khan al-Sabil.
- On 4 February 2018, barrel bombs containing chlorine injured at least 11 people in Idlib.
- From 20–21 February 2018, 8 barrel bombs were dropped on Arbin.
- In February 2018, at least 407 barrel bombs were dropped in Syria, including 297 in Eastern Ghouta and 72 in Idlib Governorate.

=== March ===
- On 5 March 2018, a barrel bomb killed at least 19 people in the town of Hammuriye in Eastern Ghouta.
- On 5 March 2018, a barrel bomb containing a poisonous gas injured at least 25 people in Hammuriye, Eastern Ghouta.
- In March 2018, at least 793 barrel bombs were dropped in Syria, including 712 in Eastern Ghouta.

=== April ===
- On 7 April 2018, barrel bombs containing poisonous gas killed at least 70 people and injured 500 in the 2018 Douma chemical attack.
- In April 2018, at least 761 barrel bombs were dropped in Syria.

=== May ===
- In May 2018, at least 93 barrel bombs were dropped in Syria, mostly in south Damascus.

=== June ===
- In June 2018, at least 427 barrel bombs were dropped in Syria, mostly in Daraa Governorate.

=== July ===
- On 17 July 2018, a barrel bomb killed at least 10 people in the village of Ain al-Tineh, southwestern Syria.
- In July 2018, at least 528 barrel bombs were dropped in Syria, mostly in Daraa Governorate.

=== August ===
- In August 2018, at least 67 barrel bombs were dropped in Syria.

=== September ===
- In September 2018, at least 98 barrel bombs were dropped in Syria.

== See also ==
- List of massacres during the Syrian Civil War
- Use of chemical weapons in the Syrian civil war
