= Kafr Latah =

Kafr Latah كفرلاته
- Town
- Location in Syria
- Coordinates: 35°47′41″N 36°37′39″E
- Country: Syria
- Governorate: Idlib
- District: Ariha
- Subdistrict: Ariha

Population (2004)
  - Total: 4,231
- Time zone: UTC+2 (EET)
  - Summer (DST): +3

Kafr Latah (Arabic: كفرلاته, also spelled Kafar Latha or Kfarlatha) is a village in northern Syria, administratively part of the Idlib Governorate, located south of Idlib. It is situated on the southern edge of a narrow valley. Nearby localities include Ariha immediately to the northwest, Maarbalit to the northeast, Sarja and Shinan to the south, al-Rami to the southwest and Urum al-Jawz to the west. According to the Syria Central Bureau of Statistics, Kafr Latah had a population of 4,231 in the 2004 census. The residents mostly work in agriculture built their houses in the village out of concrete. Prior to the ongoing Syrian Civil War, Kafr Latah was experiencing a measure of prosperity.

== History ==
In 1110, the Crusader prince Tancred of Galilee conquered Kafr Latah from the Assassins (also known as Ismailis.) In the 1220s, during Ayyubid rule, Syrian geographer Yaqut al-Hamawi described Kafr Latah as "a town with a Friday mosque on the slopes of Jabal Amilah, in the Halab [Aleppo] District and a day's distance from this last city. It has gardens and running water." He also noted that its inhabitants were Ismailis.

In the early 19th century, Kafr Latah was visited by Swiss traveler Johann Ludwig Burckhardt. He noted that the village consisted of 40-50 well-built houses of square-shaped rocks that had been collected from older ruins located on the site. The village belonged to the prominent Aleppo-based family of Ibn Ziaf. The rocky area immediately around Kafr Latah contained remains that "deserved notice, on account of the vast quantity of stone coffins and sepulchers." The remaining cultivable land was used by residents to plant barley, corn and fruit trees.

In the early 20th century, Kafr Latah was noted for being surrounded by numerous burial grounds to the east and west of the village and other archaeological features. Among these sites was a domed monument supported by four columns located in a valley just north of the village. The monument was built over a spring.

=== Syrian Civil War ===
On 15 May 2013, the Syrian Army shelled Kafr Latah with artillery. According to the Associated Press, as of October 2013 Kafr Latah was being continuously shelled by Syrian Army mortars, as it was a frontline town used by rebel fighters as a base from which they travelled to the nearby frontline to shoot at government soldiers with AK-47 rifles along a vital highway. With the exception of a handful of opposition rebels and their families, the town was largely deserted. Around two weeks prior to the AP's visit to the town, an estimated 10,000 people were living Kafr Latah, but virtually all had fled the town and are currently refugees.

On 1 June 2015, the Syrian Air Force targeted rebel forces in the town with airstrikes. On 16 June 2016, airstrikes damaged residential housing in the town. On 1 April 2018, a Syrian Air Force plane fired a missile damaging a building in the town.

== Bibliography ==
- Burckhardt, J.L. (1822). Travels in Syria and the Holy Land. J. Murray. "Burckhardt syria."
- Hodgson, M.G.S. (2005). The Secret Order of Assassins: The Struggle of the Early Nizârî Ismâʻîlîs Against the Islamic World. University of Pennsylvania Press. ISBN 9780812219166.
- Socin, A. (1906). Palestine and Syria with the chief routes through Mesopotamia and Babylonia: Handbook for Travellers. Karl Baedeker. "Birin Hama."
- Le Strange, G. (1890). Palestine Under the Moslems: A Description of Syria and the Holy Land from A.D. 650 to 1500. Committee of the Palestine Exploration Fund.
