= Kurin, Syria =

Kurin كورين
- Town
- Location within Syria
- Coordinates: 35°51′51″N 36°34′6″E
- Country: Syria
- Governorate: Idlib
- District: Ariha
- Subdistrict: Ariha

Population (2004)
  - Total: 5,488
- Time zone: UTC+2 (EET)
  - Summer (DST): UTC+3 (EEST)

Kurin (Arabic: كورين, also spelled Korin) is a village in northern Syria, administratively part of the Idlib Governorate, located southwest of Idlib. Nearby localities include the district center Ariha and Nahlaya to the southeast, Maataram and Urum al-Jawz to the south, Basanqul to the southwest, Ayn Shib to the northwest and Faylun to the northeast. According to the Syria Central Bureau of Statistics, Kurin had a population of 5,488 in the 2004 census.

== Syrian Civil War ==
During the Syrian civil war, the village came under control of the jihadist group Tahrir al-Sham (HTS), operating under the Syrian Salvation Government.

In the early hours of 21 August 2023, at least 13 HTS fighters were killed in Russian airstrikes on a militant-held house in the village.
