= Idlib Governorate clashes (June 2012 – April 2013) =

Part of the Syrian civil war

June 2012–April 2013 Idlib Governorate clashes
- Part of the 2012–13 escalation of the Syrian Civil War
- Approximate situation in Idlib Governorate, mid-August 2012 Syrian Army control Syrian Opposition control PYD control
Date	3 June 2012 – 18 April 2013 (10 months, 2 weeks and 1 day)
Location	Idlib Governorate, Syria
Result	Partial rebel victory; Stalemate: FSA takes control of Salqin, Armanaz, Harem, Sarmin, Darkush, Kafr Nabl, Ma'arat al-Numan and Taftanaz; Government forces maintain control over Jisr ash-Shugur, Fu'ah, Idlib city, Abu al-Duhur airbase and Khan Shaykhun and recapture Ariha; Siege of Wadi Deif military base from October 2012 through April 2013 broken

Belligerents
Syrian Opposition; Free Syrian Army; Kata’ib Ahrar Al-Sham; Islamic Vanguard; Al-Nusra Front	(Syria) Syrian Government

Commanders and leaders
Mohammad Issa (Idlib Martyrs' Brigade) Basil Eissa † (Idlib Martyrs' Brigade) Jamal Maarouf (Syrian Martyrs' Brigades); Abdel-Rahman Ayachi; Abdul-Rahman al-Souri (Kata’ib Ahrar Al-Sham)	Maj. Gen. Fo'ad Hamoudeh; Maj. Gen. Ramadan Mahmoud Ramadan; Brig. Gen. Ghassan Afif

Units involved
Free Syrian Army; Idlib Military Council; Syrian Martyrs' Brigades; Idlib Martyrs' Brigade; Suqour al-Sham Brigades; Liwa Dawud; Ahfad al-Rasul Brigades; Farouq Brigades; Knights of Justice Brigade; Khan Sheikhoun Brigade; Maarrat al-Nu'man Martyrs Brigade	Syrian Armed Forces; Syrian Army; 1st Armored Division; 76th Armoured Brigade; 5th Mechanized Division; 12th Armoured Brigade; 17th Mechanized Division (Reserve); 9th Armored Division; 34th Armoured Brigade; 15th Division; 35th SF Regiment; 41st independent SF regiments; 45th independent SF regiments; Syrian Air Force; Shabiha

Strength
25,000 fighters: 2,500 - 3,000 al-Nusra fighters; 2,000-3,000 fighters (Jabal al-Zawiya area); 1,000 fighters (Idlib city)	10,500+ soldiers 250 tanks

Casualties and losses
1,876+ fighters killed	1,893+ soldiers killed
- 9,000 overall killed

The June 2012 – April 2013 Idlib Governorate clashes was a series of clashes within the scope of the Syrian civil war, that took place in Syria's Idlib Governorate. The events followed the April 2012 Idlib Governorate Operation by the Syrian government and consequent cease-fire attempt, which had lasted from 14 April to 2 June 2012.

== Timeline ==
=== June 2012 ===
In early June, the area known as the al-Ghab plain, was reportedly under rebel control. One of the main rebel headquarters was in the town of Qalaat al-Madiq. The Syrian Government army still had a base near Qalaat al-Mudiq, in the old citadel, but was respecting a truce with the rebels. FSA forces had captured territory from the mountains around Jisr al-Shughour in the north of Idlib province to the town of Tell Salhab in the south, and east to the highway that links the cities of Hama and Idlib. The outskirts of Jisr al-Shughour were also reportedly under opposition control as well as the edges of Idlib city and the surrounding areas. However, Idlib proper was still being held by government forces. Rebels were administering justice and providing local services, including the distribution of cooking gas and food in these areas. The U.N. cease-fire that was supposed to begin in April had never really taken effect.

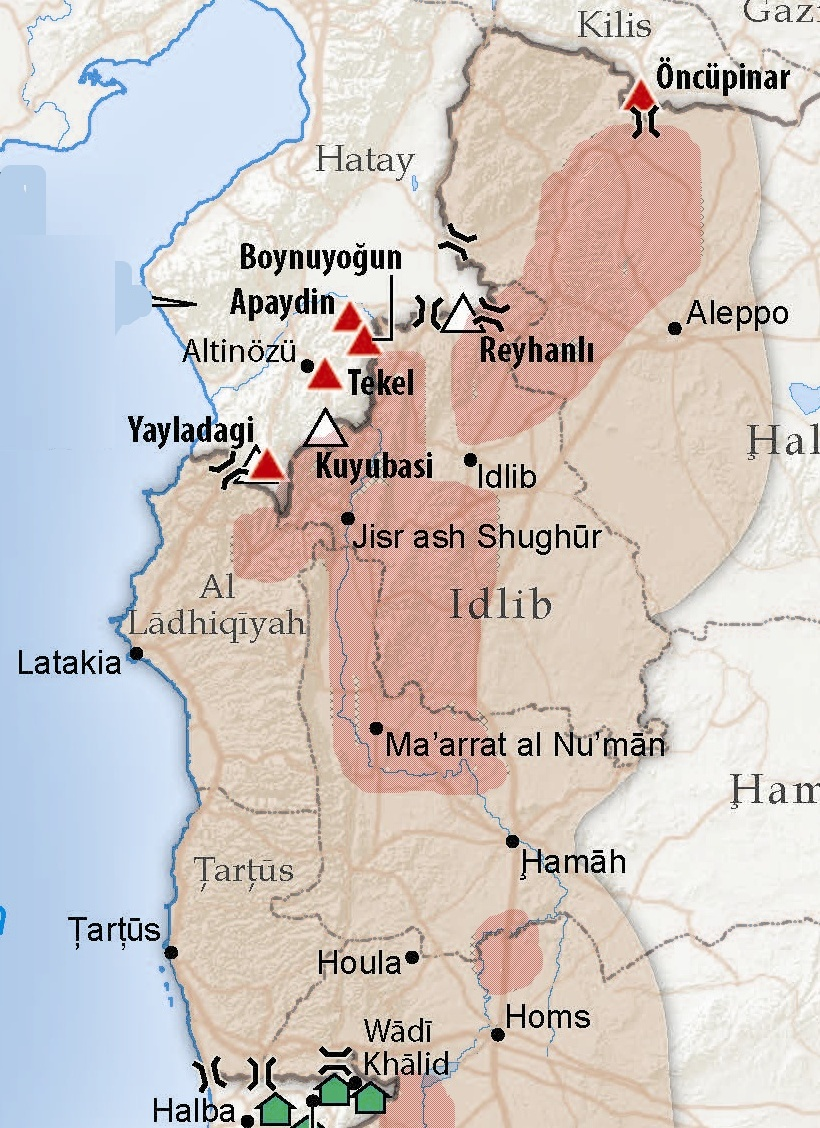
Areas of conflict and displacement (light purple), refugee camps (red triangles), displaced in host homes (green houses), FSA held territory (red), June 2012.

A journalist spent time in a village controlled by the Sham Falcons forces of the FSA and witnessed an ambush on approaching government soldiers, in which three soldiers were claimed killed. The majority of the men fighting for the rebels were reportedly locals who were living close by. The journalist also witnessed a government helicopter attack on a village where rebels were holding a meeting, during which an eight-year-old boy and his father were killed, the article reported that attacks like these turned some civilians into rebels. Sham Falcons were operating in Jabal al-Zawiya region of Idlib Governorate. Eight out of the 35 villages of the Jabal al-Zawiya region of Idlib province, around 25 percent, were reportedly under opposition control.

Three soldiers were killed on 6 June by an explosion targeting their vehicle. Five days later, a bomb exploded in Idlib city killing seven soldiers and one civilian, and two weeks later, five soldiers were killed when a car bomb exploded at their checkpoint in Idlib city. On 21 June 2 soldiers were reported killed.

A group called the Damascus Falcons, which has 1,000 members, destroyed a military camp near to its headquarters in a village in Idlib province. They emerged victorious, captured one tank from the base and photographed 35 dead soldiers in that attack. 5 soldiers were later captured, then they were executed by the Falcons who had put them on trial and found them guilty of killing civilians.

Two months after the military operation in the town of Taftnaz, two-thirds of the population had left. The town had been a centre for opposition protests until the army had raided it with tanks on 3 April. Witnesses in the town said that tanks shelled the town from four sides before armored cars brought in dozens of soldiers who dragged civilians from their homes and gunned them down in the streets, and they also claimed that the soldiers also looted, destroyed and torched hundreds of homes, bringing some down on their owners' heads. Videos showed this, and 62 people were killed during the attack, despite the town only having a small rebel prescience. 9 government tanks were destroyed by homemade bombs as they left though.

The government reported on 21 June that two soldiers and a number of rebels were killed in the armed clashes. Two days later, the army killed four rebels in Jabal al-Zawiya, according to state media. Three days later, state media claimed that nine rebels and two policemen were killed in Idlib Governorate.

It was reported on 26 June that around 280 soldiers defected from the army on the main highway running from Idlib to Aleppo and clashed with government troops. During the fighting, the army defectors brought down one helicopter and destroyed three tanks near Saraqib. This was one of the largest defections up until that time in Idlib, in an area that since March was considered under government control, after the army had cracked down on Idlib and Saraqib. One day later, armed clashed in Idlib resulted in the death of six civilians, three rebels and five soldiers, including a colonel from the elite Republican Guard. Around the same time it was reported that Saraqib was under opposition control. SANA reported four rebels were killed in the fighting in the governorate.

In late June, a BBC reporter sneaked into Syria and confirmed that the Syrian rebels were growing in numbers, were better armed and that they controlled large swathes of land in the north of Idlib governorate.

=== July 2012 ===
The Turkish government reported on 3 July that 85 soldiers, including a general and a number of other high-ranking officers, had defected from the Syrian army and crossed into Turkey. Three days later, five soldiers were killed near Maarrat al-Nu'man by an explosion. The Syrian army responded by bombarding the town and killing two rebels. On the same day, the army advanced on Khan Shaykhun and entered the city and inflicted heavy losses on the rebels. During the fighting, the government suffered a number of heavy losses as well. The government later took control of the town and forced the opposition to retreat. On 8 July, two more rebels were killed in Khan Shaykhun, opposition sources reported.

On 10 July, three soldiers, including an officer, were killed when their car was attacked.

On 11 July 7 soldiers were killed in Idlib province.

On 13 July, the opposition activist group Syrian Observatory reported that 18 rebels had been killed in attack in the Idlib Governorate by the army. On 14 July, the same group reported that another 10 rebels were killed while 15 other were wounded near the Turkish border.

On 16 July 12 soldiers were killed when their military truck was attacked.

On 18 July, following bombing in Damascus which claimed lives of several most prominent government officials, troops reportedly withdrew from Maarrat al-Nu'man area. Local FSA commander in one of the rebel controlled towns also said to TIME journalist that about 1,500 fighters from Idlib were sent to Damascus to reinforce the ongoing rebel offensive. Also, it was reported that some 60 soldiers defected in Bab al-Hawa in Idlib to join the Free Syrian Army. Some of the defected soldiers came with seven tanks.

The rebels tried to take over a border crossing with Turkey but were repelled by the Syrian Army. However, the rebels later seized control of the Bab al-Hawa crossing on the border with Turkey according to S.O.H.R. They reportedly controlled the gate and customs and immigration buildings after 10 days of trying to overrun it. It was also reported that Bab al-Salam crossing with Turkey was also taken by the FSA. A third crossing with Turkey at the town of Jarabulus also fell into rebel hands after Assad's forces abandoned the town.

The following day, the Syrian Army retook control of the Bab al-Hawa crossing according to Turkish journalists. However, on 21 June Andrew Thomas, working for Al-Jazeera, traveled to the Bab al-Hawa crossing and saw that the Syrian side was under firm control of the Free Syrian Army, with a checkpoint set up near the Turkish border. The army held a base some kilometers down the road into Syria, but no shooting was going on as of the moment.

Rebels were reported to be looting, burning and racketing Turkish trucks drivers. On 22 July, the Free Syrian Army controlled three crossings into Turkey, two of them in the Idlib governorate. Also, rebel fighters had taken the town of Armanaz north of Idlib. Twelve rebels were killed and 40 wounded in the attack on the Bab al-Salam crossing, which they later took control of. On 23 July state media reported that at least 5 rebels were killed in Sahel al Rouj, Idlib governorate.

On 25 July, the regular army pulled units back from Idlib to Aleppo. Rebels attacked the Syrian Army armoured column near Urum al-Jawz, al-Rami and al-Bara.

On 27 July, Syrian rebels captured 50 troops, including 14 officers, in the town of Maarrat al-Nu'man, the Syrian Observatory for Human Rights said. "After clashes that lasted 12 hours, rebels destroyed a military security post and captured 50 regime troops, including 14 officers." Four rebels were killed.

On 30 July, one soldier was killed in Idlib.

In late July, a journalist met with a rebel brigade with Libyan volunteers, commanded by leader of the Tripoli Brigade during the Libyan Civil War, Mahdi al-Harati. 90% of the brigades 6,000 fighters were Syrian. Harati was training the fighters, and the brigade were involved in a battle that killed 63 soldiers and 3 rebels in Idlib province. On 4 August a lot of rebels were killed, including 4 who were named and 4 others who were arrested. At least two rebels were killed and five others arrested on 12 August, the Syrian media reported.

=== August 2012 ===
Late on 11 August, government forces recaptured the town of Ariha after troops backed by tanks entered it. Rebels had captured the town months before. On 13 August, Al Jazeera reported that the rebels had returned to Ariha and had managed to block a key route in the town that led to Aleppo.

On 29 August, the Free Syrian Army opened an offensive near Taftanaz. The goal was to capture or destroy the main military base there, from where most helicopters in Idlib operated. The rebels for the first time used technicals and heavy weapons in their assault on the army base. Fighting was ongoing for hours. Rebels reported they had suffered some casualties, but that they had also damaged a number of helicopters in Taftanaz. The army shelled the area. The military claimed to have repelled the attack and 14 soldiers and two rebels were killed. By 31 August, rebels claimed to have taken the airbase and destroyed 10 helicopter gunships that were stationed there.

On 30 August, a MiG fighter plane was shot down in the area, with rebel videos showing the pilot parachuting to safety but in a latter video he is found dead.

During August, rebel forces had also seized the town of Kafr Nabl, capturing 112 soldiers in the process.

=== September 2012 ===
On 22 September, rebels claimed to have carried out a coordinated attack involving 3 rebel battalions on an army base, and then preventing Syrian Army reinforcements from reaching the base. They also claimed to have shot down a fighter jet during the attack, though this was not independently confirmed.

By September 2012, the Syrian Air Force base at Abu al-Thuhur in eastern Idlib Governorate was partially besieged by rebel fighters. The rebels, led by prominent commander Jamal Maarouf, established positions on the base's western edge, from where they were able to fire on the base's runways. The base was reported to have been rendered effectively unusable as a result, with planes no longer able to fly to or from it.

=== October 2012 ===
In early October, rebels took control of the town of Khirbet al-Joz near the border with Turkey. The fighting lasted 12 hours and resulted in at least 40 dead among the Syrian army forces, including five officers, and nine rebel fighters.

On 8 October, the rebels launched an offensive to capture the town of Maarrat al-Nu'man, which holds a strategic position through which all government reinforcements from Damascus heading toward Aleppo would need to come through. The city had already been captured once before by the rebels, on 10 June, but was recaptured by the military in August. During the evening, the Air Force started conducting air-strikes against the town in an attempt to stop the rebel attack. By the next day, rebels seized all of the government checkpoints around Maarrat al-Nu'man, except one at the entrance to the town. During the takeover, rebels captured a government detention facility at the Arabic Cultural Center. There, they reportedly found the corpses of 21 detainees, including 2 defecting soldiers. Overall, not counting fatalities among government forces, more than 60 people were killed in the fighting for the town. At least 40 of the dead were civilians, while the rest were rebels. 19 soldiers were killed in attacks on military checkpoints and centers and IED explosions elsewhere in the province. with 31 more being killed in the next two days.

On 10 October, rebels were in control of the western entrance to the city, while the military was in control of the eastern entrance, where government troops were reportedly massing for a counter-offensive. Tanks from Mastumah, south of Idlib city, were being sent to Maarrat al-Nu'man. Army forces were deployed along the highway to secure a corridor for the tanks. Rebels were making attempts to stop their advance and reportedly damaging three tanks. Rebel fighters also intercepted troops on the outskirts of Khan Shaykhun, south of Maarrat al-Nu'man. Later that day, the military conducted a counter-attack in an attempt to recapture the town. The rebels managed to repel the attack, but suffered heavy casualties, with one report stating 30 opposition fighters were killed. With that, the number of rebels and civilians killed in the city reached 100. An opposition activist also said 50 defectors were executed by the military. During the battle, it was said that 46 rebels and defectors and 196 soldiers were killed.

On 11 October, SOHR claimed that 39 soldiers were killed in the region and 8 pro-government Shabiha militia were killed on an attack on a checkpoint in Saraqib. with 16 soldiers being killed the next day.

On 14 October, rebels captured the town of Azmarin, near the Turkish border.

On 28 October, the Free Syrian Army claimed it had taken control of Salqin, the last government controlled suburb of Idlib city. During the clashes, some 50 Syrian Army soldiers were killed or captured. The taking of Salqin means that Syrian Army now only control Jisr ash-Shughur, Idlib city and Khan Shaykun in the Idlib province. Government forces shelled the Al-Dira area of Idlib, causing civilian casualties and damage.

On 30 October 2012, FSA announced it had taken control of Al-Tlul and Al-Alani near the Turkish border and many of Assad's soldiers were taken prisoners.

=== November 2012 ===
On 1 November 28 soldiers and 5 rebels were killed. Three checkpoints on the road from Damascus to Aleppo were attacked by the rebels near the rebel-controlled town of Saraqib, the Al Jazeera said.

On 3 November the FSA had attacked the Taftanaz military airport in the northern province of Idlib in the early hours using rocket launchers and at least three tanks. SANA also said that the rebels used mortars as well and that the Army had killed a large number of them. The rebels claimed to have destroyed some helicopters on the base. Video posted online showed heavy fighting, with the FSA using tanks and rocket launchers against government forces.

On 5 November a Syrian Air Force attack killed at least 20 FSA members in the town of Harem, including the rebel brigade commander, Basil Eissa.

On 13 November the Syrian Army announced that Sararif town of Jisr al-Shughur was as a secure area.

=== December 2012 ===
On 25 December, rebel forces announced that they had fully taken control of the town of Harem near the Turkish border after weeks of heavy fighting with the Syrian Army.

On 26 December, violent clashes are still ongoing, between regular forces from one side and Jihadists from the al-Nusra front as well as other rebel battalions on the other, in the perimeter of the Wadi al-Deif encampment, al-Hamdiya, A'in Qrei' and al-Za'lana military checkpoints. Activists from the SOHR reported that rebel fighters planted tons of explosives in a bulldozer and drove it inside the encampment, an intense explosion was heard afterwards in the perimeter of the area. SOHR activists described clashes as the "most violent for months". Clashes led to the death of 5 rebel fighters, including a defected officer. Initial reports indicate that several regular forces were killed and injured and 6 heavy machineries were destroyed. The perimeter of the Wadi al-Deif encampment was subject to aerial bombardment a while earlier.

On 29 December rebels shot down a helicopter that was flying over Saraqib and its surrounding area, It crashed and burned by the Taftanaz military airport. The towns of Deir Sharqi and Maar Shurin, which are by the Wadi al-Dayf military base, are being bombarded by the air force. The town of Maar Shurin was bombarded by the air force, who targeted a rebel base in the town, there are reports of both civilian and rebel losses as a result. The village of al-Junoudia was bombarded.

=== January 2013 ===
On 2 January, the strategic Taftanaz military airbase (which rebels have repeatedly tried to capture but failed) was attacked by rebels launching what they called "the battle to liberate Taftanaz Military airport" involving three rebel brigades. Casualties have been reported on both sides in the fighting, but precise numbers were not available.

On 3 January, violent clashes are taking place between regular forces and fighters from al-Nusra front, Ahrar ash-Sham, Dawood and al-Tali'a al-Islamiya battalions in the perimeter of the Taftanaz military airport and some areas inside the airport, along with aerial bombardment on some of the rebel areas inside and outside the airport. 5 civilians were killed, several others injured, as a result of bombardment on the town of Qmeinas by a government checkpoint. There are reports that 2 women were also killed as a result.

On 5 January, rebel leader Capt. Islam Aloush claimed rebels had made progress in the fight to take control of Taftanaz Heliport. He stated that 70% of the base was now in rebel control and that rebels had killed the head of the base in the clashes. However he noted that the Syrian Army still had "a few dozen" soldiers defending the base, as well as 30 snipers. This was, however, in stark contrast to statements made by the director of the opposition activist group SOHR. He stated that the rebel attack on Taftanaz had in fact failed, with the base being still in government hands, and that there had been no fighting in the area for the previous two days.

On 9 January, Al-Jazeera reported that units of the Free Syrian Army, supported by the Al-Nusra Front, had taken control of a large part of the Taftanaz military base. Rebel commanders state that the rebels were able to destroy several helicopters inside the base. Government forces used airpower to try to push the rebels back.

Rebel's claimed to have overrun the Taftanaz air base on 11 January, capturing large amounts of weaponry. Rebel fighters and militants from various Islamic groups, including the jihadist Ahrar ash-Sham and al Qaeda linked al-Nusra Front, took part in the offensive, an opposition spokesman said Friday. They say they've seized control of buildings, ammunition and military equipment at the base in Idlib province, signaling a major blow to President Bashar al-Assad's force. The strategic base is used by government forces to send explosives to areas in the north, according to the opposition Syrian Observatory for Human Rights. In addition to housing about government 400 soldiers, the group said, warplanes that attack the region take off from there. The Syrian military struck back hours after rebels captured the base, launching air strikes on the area, According to the SOHR.

An opposition activist claimed 100 soldiers and 20 rebels were killed during the battle for the air base. An online video showed about half a dozen soldiers, reportedly pilots, in a shallow hole who were shot en masse, execution style, by al-Nusra militants for their refusal to defect to the rebels.

On 12 January 2013, it was reported that FSA took over the town of Al-Rami earlier in the week.

On 13 January, Fighter airplanes carried out several air raids on the Taftanaz military airport, which led to the destruction of several buildings and helicopters of the airport.

On 26 January, rebels from the Free Syrian Army attacked the Idlib prison and freed some 300 prisoners. More than 10 fighters and 19 soldiers were killed in heavy fighting inside the complex, which is the last major Assad stronghold west of Idlib city. At nightfall, some parts of the complex were still in loyalist hands.

On 20 January a coordinated attack on Idlib city was begun by the FSA. They overran several checkpoints on the Western edges of Idlib, one attack at Rodoko checkpoint led to the killing of 15 Syrian Army soldiers (the rest fled on foot) and allowed rebels to capture 3 tanks and the checkpoints weapons cache. Furthermore, rebels could start to siege the central prison of Idlib, which holds more than 600 inmates.

=== February 2013 ===
Situation in Idlib, mid-March 2013. Syrian Army control Syrian Opposition control

Approximate situation in Idlib governorate, mid-June 2013. Syrian Army control Syrian Opposition control PYD control

On 7 February 2013, Time Magazine reported that the task of cutting off the crucial M5 highway that ferries military supplies from Hama and Damascus north to Idlib and Aleppo has largely fallen to the rebels of Hish, a town about 17 km from the important Wadi Daif military base. The rebels blew up an overpass on the stretch of asphalt that passes below them, using an improvised explosive device planted under cover of darkness. The destroyed overpass cut off part of the highway. Now they were hoping to destroy the rest of it. Four snipers hid behind a makeshift wall of white stones piled atop one another, a little over waist-high, their scopes trained on the road below. Several other men, rifles at the ready, stood behind a thin cinderblock wall, a structure unlikely to offer any protection should the tanks stationed several hundred meters away near a loyalist outpost on a hill overlooking the highway turn their turrets in the rebels' direction. At the other end of Hish, several groups were digging a trench leading to their end of the highway

=== April 2013 ===
During April 2013 Syrian government forces broke a rebel blockade on the Idlib highway. Later fighters began attacking Abu Duhur airbase. The government was still in control of the base, but rebels had been besieging the base for months. The Syrian Army used helicopters and fighter jets to shell rebel positions. Rebels were shelling the airport.
