= Faylun =

Faylun فيلون
- Village
- Location within Syria
- Coordinates: 35°52′50″N 36°36′44″E
- Country: Syria
- Governorate: Idlib
- District: Idlib
- Subdistrict: Idlib

Population (2004)
  - Total: 3,136
- Time zone: UTC+2 (EET)
  - Summer (DST): UTC+3 (EEST)
- Climate: Csa

Faylun (Arabic: فيلون) is a village in northern Syria, administratively part of Idlib Governorate, located south of Idlib. Nearby localities include al-Mastumah to the east, Idlib to the north, Ayn Shib to the northwest, Kurin to the west, Nahlaya to the south and Ariha to the south. According to the Syria Central Bureau of Statistics, Faylun had a population of 3,136 in the 2004 census.
