= Matleh, Ariha =

Matleh المطلة
- Village
- Country: Syria
- Governorate: Idlib
- District: Ariha District
- Subdistrict: Muhambal Nahiyah

Population (2004)
  - Total: 478
- Time zone: UTC+2 (EET)
  - Summer (DST): UTC+3 (EEST)
- City Qrya Pcode: C4317

Matleh (Arabic: المطلة) is a Syrian village located in Muhambal Nahiyah in Ariha District, Idlib. According to the Syria Central Bureau of Statistics (CBS), Matleh had a population of 478 in the 2004 census.
