= Nahlaya =

Nahlaya نحليا
- Town
- Location within Syria
- Coordinates: 35°50′47″N 36°36′1″E
- Country: Syria
- Governorate: Idlib
- District: Ariha
- Subdistrict: Ariha

Population (2004)
  - Total: 3,105
- Time zone: UTC+2 (EET)
  - Summer (DST): UTC+3 (EEST)

Nahlaya (Arabic: نحليا, also spelled Nahlia) is a village in northern Syria, administratively part of the Idlib Governorate, located south of Idlib. Nearby localities include district center Ariha to the south, Kurin to the northwest and Faylun and al-Mastumah to the north. According to the Syria Central Bureau of Statistics, Nahlaya had a population of 3,105 in the 2004 census.
