= Maarzaf, Idlib =

Maarzaf, Idlib معرزاف
- Village
- Location in Syria
- Coordinates: 35°47′20″N 36°39′08″E
- Country: Syria
- Governorate: Idlib
- District: Ariha District
- Subdistrict: Ariha Nahiyah

Population (2004)
  - Total: 1,048
- Time zone: UTC+2 (EET)
  - Summer (DST): UTC+3 (EEST)
- City Qrya Pcode: C4279

Maarzaf, Idlib (Arabic: معرزاف) is a Syrian village located in Ariha Nahiyah in Ariha District, Idlib. According to the Syria Central Bureau of Statistics (CBS), Maarzaf, Idlib had a population of 1048 in the 2004 census.
