= Nahleh =

Coordinates: 35.7814°N 36.5906°E

Nahleh نحلة
- Village
- Location in Syria
- Country: Syria
- Governorate: Idlib
- District: Ariha District
- Subdistrict: Ariha Nahiyah

Population (2004)
  - Total: 1,189
- Time zone: UTC+2 (EET)
  - Summer (DST): UTC+3 (EEST)
- City Qrya Pcode: C4284

Nahleh (Arabic: نحلة) is a Syrian village located in Ariha Nahiyah in Ariha District, Idlib. According to the Syria Central Bureau of Statistics (CBS), Nahleh had a population of 1189 in the 2004 census.
