= Mseibin =

Mseibin مصيبين
- Town
- Location in Syria
- Country: Syria
- Governorate: Idlib
- District: Ariha District
- Subdistrict: Ariha Nahiyah

Population (2004)
  - Total: 2,021
- Time zone: UTC+2 (EET)
  - Summer (DST): UTC+3 (EEST)
- City Qrya Pcode: C4281

Mseibin (Arabic: مصيبين) is a Syrian village located in Ariha Nahiyah in Ariha District, Idlib. According to the Syria Central Bureau of Statistics (CBS), Mseibin had a population of 2,021 in the 2004 census. The village has been shelled numerous times during the Syrian Civil War.
