= Marata, Idlib =

Marata, Idlib معراتة
- Town
- Location in Syria
- Coordinates: 35°42′30″N 36°28′40″E
- Country: Syria
- Governorate: Idlib
- District: Ariha District
- Subdistrict: Ihsim Nahiyah

Population (2004)
  - Total: 2,263
- Time zone: UTC+2 (EET)
  - Summer (DST): UTC+3 (EEST)
- City Qrya Pcode: C4307

Marata, Idlib (Arabic: معراتة) is a Syrian village located in Ihsim Nahiyah in Ariha District, Idlib. According to the Syria Central Bureau of Statistics (CBS), Marata, Idlib had a population of 2263 in the 2004 census.
