= Hmeimat =

Hmeimat حميمات
- Village
- Location in Syria
- Coordinates: 35°39′51″N 36°24′32″E
- Country: Syria
- Governorate: Idlib
- District: Ariha District
- Subdistrict: Muhambal Nahiyah

Population (2004)
  - Total: 583
- Time zone: UTC+2 (EET)
  - Summer (DST): UTC+3 (EEST)
- City Qrya Pcode: C4319

Hmeimat (Arabic: حميمات) is a Syrian village located in Muhambal Nahiyah in Ariha District, Idlib. According to the Syria Central Bureau of Statistics (CBS), Hmeimat had a population of 583 in the 2004 census.
