= Kafrmid =

Kafrmid كفرميد
- Village
- Location in Syria
- Coordinates: 35.805278°N 36.440833°E
- Country: Syria
- Governorate: Idlib
- District: Ariha District
- Subdistrict: Muhambal Nahiyah

Population (2004)
  - Total: 593
- Time zone: UTC+2 (EET)
  - Summer (DST): UTC+3 (EEST)
- City Qrya Pcode: C4329

Kafrmid (Arabic: كفرميد) is a Syrian village located in Muhambal Nahiyah in Ariha District, Idlib. According to the Syria Central Bureau of Statistics (CBS), Kafrmid had a population of 593 in the 2004 census.
