= Ariha, Idlib =

Ariha أَرِيحَا
- Town
- Location in Syria
- Coordinates: 35°49′N 36°36′E
- Country: Syria
- Governorate: Idlib Governorate
- District: Ariha District
- Subdistrict: Ariha Nahiyah
- Elevation: 680 m (2,230 ft)

Population (2004)
  - Total: 39,501
- Demonym(s): Arabic: ريحاوي, romanized: Rīḥāwi
- Time zone: UTC+2 (EET)
  - Summer (DST): +3

Ariha (Arabic: أَرِيحَا, romanized: ʾArīḥā), also called Riha (رِيحَا, Rīḥā), is a town in northwest Syria, administratively part of the Idlib Governorate, located south of Idlib. Nearby localities include Urum al-Jawz to the southwest, Sarjah to the south, Kafr Latah to the southeast, Maar Bilit to the east, al-Nayrab to the northeast, Nahlaya and al-Mastumah to the north, Kurin to the northwest and Maataram to the west. According to the Syria Central Bureau of Statistics, Ariha had a population of 39,501 in the 2004 census. The town is also the administrative centre of the Ariha District and the Ariha nahiyah (subdistrict), which consists of 24 localities, with a combined population of 83,487 in 2004.

== History ==
During the era of the Roman Empire and Eastern Roman Empire, Ariha was administratively dependent on Antioch. It reached its peak between 240 and 350 AD, as it became an important center of Christianity. The city was captured by the Rashidun army led by Amr ibn al-As in 636, and it became part of Jund Qinnasrin. During the Ayyubid era, it was under the administration of Aleppo and again then of Qinnasrin.

The Syrian geographer Yaqut al-Hamawi wrote in 1226 that Ariha was a small town in the district of Aleppo and "one of the pleasantest and best of the places on God's earth." He remarked that it was abundant in orchards, gardens and rivers.

Ariha was badly damaged in an earthquake in 1822.

In the mid-19th century, Orientalist Albert Socin passed by Ariha, noting that it had an estimated 3,000 inhabitants and was "beautifully situated" among olive orchards at the northern base of Jabal Zawiya.

=== Syrian revolution ===
During the Syrian revolution, Ariha was the scene of fighting between government and rebel forces. The Free Syrian Army repelled a series of government assaults between March and June 2012, despite the government's ability to execute combined arms operations involving armored vehicles, artillery, and helicopter gunships. The city was retaken by the government on 11 August 2012.

By late July 2013, rebels controlled parts of Ariha, while government forces occupied three checkpoints inside the town.

On 25 May 2014, the al-Nusra Front and the Suqour al-Sham Brigade launched a two-pronged assault on the southern Ariha hills with the objective of seizing two military outposts; the Fanar Restaurant Checkpoint and the Shami Military Installation sit atop two peaks in the area south of the town and control access to the southern neighborhoods of Ariha via two access roads. At 6 in the morning, the al-Nusra Front with support from Suqour al-Sham detonated four SVBIEDs against government infrastructure targets. All four SVBIEDs exploded in the Jabal al-Arbaeen area on the southern outskirts of Ariha. The first SVBIED, driven by Moner Mohammad Abu Salha, a 22-year-old American man from Florida, approached the Fanar Restaurant Checkpoint from the southwest along a dirt road. The 16-ton armored truck completely destroyed the checkpoint and caused it to crumble in on itself, leaving only few survivors to defend it. Over the course of the battle, two more SVBIEDs exploded to the west of Fanar, targeting the Shami Military Complex. The first two SVBIEDs targeted the Commander'’s building and Shami Checkpoint. One final VBIED targeted the Aram building, however the driver of the VBIED was able to park his vehicle and escape uninjured. The four explosions were followed by a barrage of artillery and gunfire. By the end of the day Jabhat al-Nusra and Suquor al-Sham had seized both the Fanar and Shami Checkpoints in one of the largest coordinated SVBIED attacks since the beginning of 2014. However, on 13 October 2014, it was reported that rebels destroyed a government APC at al-Fanar Checkpoint.

On 24 August 2014, rebels captured Ariha. The M4 passes through Ariha before connecting with the M5 in Saraqib. Controlling the section of the M4 in Ariha allowed opposition forces to cut off the government's supply line from Latakia to Idlib and Aleppo cities. Two days later, on 26 August, rebels attacked the government-controlled Qiyasat checkpoint next to Ariha, destroying a government tank in their attempt to disrupt the government's supply line from Idlib to Latakia. "The rebels are trying to capture Ariha so they can move closer to [Idlib]," Ines Qadur, an independent journalist in the south of Idlib, told Syria Direct, "where they will be able to make Idlib city the next battle front.". However, after 10 days of bombardment, government forces recaptured the town on September 3.

On 25 May 2015, the Army of Conquest led by the al-Qaeda-linked al-Nusra Front captured Ariha from government forces.

On 12 January 2017, Russian warplanes raided around Ariha, killing an Uyghur Turkistan Islamic Party leader Abu Rida al-Turkistani and his family. Doğu Türkistan Bülteni Haber Ajansı said that Russian planes bombed the families of militant jihadist Uyghur fighters in Idlib and the TIP retaliated by firing rockets against Iranian militias in the region.

On 21 February 2018, the Syrian Liberation Front captured Ariha from Tahrir al-Sham. In January 2019, Tahrir al-Sham recaptured Ariha.

== Climate ==
Ariha has a hot-summer Mediterranean climate (Köppen climate classification: Csa).

Climate data for Ariha
| Month | Jan | Feb | Mar | Apr | May | Jun | Jul | Aug | Sep | Oct | Nov | Dec | Year |
|---|---|---|---|---|---|---|---|---|---|---|---|---|---|
| Mean daily maximum °C (°F) | 8.8 (47.8) | 11.0 (51.8) | 15.6 (60.1) | 21.1 (70.0) | 27.1 (80.8) | 31.2 (88.2) | 33.0 (91.4) | 33.7 (92.7) | 30.8 (87.4) | 25.5 (77.9) | 17.9 (64.2) | 11.3 (52.3) | 22.3 (72.1) |
| Daily mean °C (°F) | 5.2 (41.4) | 6.6 (43.9) | 10.3 (50.5) | 14.8 (58.6) | 20.0 (68.0) | 24.4 (75.9) | 26.7 (80.1) | 27.1 (80.8) | 23.9 (75.0) | 18.9 (66.0) | 12.3 (54.1) | 7.3 (45.1) | 16.5 (61.6) |
| Mean daily minimum °C (°F) | 1.6 (34.9) | 2.3 (36.1) | 5.1 (41.2) | 8.5 (47.3) | 13.0 (55.4) | 17.6 (63.7) | 20.5 (68.9) | 20.6 (69.1) | 17.0 (62.6) | 12.3 (54.1) | 6.7 (44.1) | 3.3 (37.9) | 10.7 (51.3) |
| Average precipitation mm (inches) | 104 (4.1) | 96 (3.8) | 67 (2.6) | 42 (1.7) | 21 (0.8) | 7 (0.3) | 0 (0) | 0 (0) | 8 (0.3) | 26 (1.0) | 43 (1.7) | 107 (4.2) | 521 (20.5) |
| Average snowy days | 3 | 1 | 0 | 0 | 0 | 0 | 0 | 0 | 0 | 0 | 0 | 1 | 5 |
Source: Climate-Data.org

== Bibliography ==
- le Strange, Guy (1890). Palestine Under the Moslems: A Description of Syria and the Holy Land from A.D. 650 to 1500. Committee of the Palestine Exploration Fund.
- Socin, Albert (1906). Palestine and Syria with the chief routes through Mesopotamia and Babylonia: Handbook for Travellers. Karl Baedeker. "Birin Hama."
