= Shagurit =

Shagurit شاغوريت
- Village
- Location in Syria
- Country: Syria
- Governorate: Idlib
- District: Ariha District
- Subdistrict: Muhambal Nahiyah

Population (2004)
  - Total: 684
- Time zone: UTC+2 (EET)
  - Summer (DST): UTC+3 (EEST)
- City Qrya Pcode: C4311

Shagurit (Arabic: شاغوريت) is a Syrian village located in Muhambal Nahiyah in Ariha District, Idlib. According to the Syria Central Bureau of Statistics (CBS), Shagurit had a population of 684 in the 2004 census.

== Syrian Civil War ==
On 11 June 2012, a clash occurred between the Free Syrian Army and the Syrian Arab Army, after the latter tried to retake to settlement. The attack was repelled.
