= Ora Qabli - Edwan =

Ora Qabli - Edwan عرى القبلي عدوان
- Village
- Location in Syria
- Country: Syria
- Governorate: Idlib
- District: Ariha District
- Subdistrict: Muhambal Nahiyah

Population (2004)
  - Total: 1,976
- Time zone: UTC+2 (EET)
  - Summer (DST): UTC+3 (EEST)
- City Qrya Pcode: C4312

Ora Qabli - Edwan (Arabic: عرى القبلي عدوان) is a Syrian village located in Muhambal Nahiyah in Ariha District, Idlib. According to the Syria Central Bureau of Statistics (CBS), Ora Qabli - Edwan had a population of 1,976 in the 2004 census.
