= Moataf =

Moataf منطف
- Village
- Location in Syria
- Coordinates: 35°46′42″N 36°39′07″E
- Country: Syria
- Governorate: Idlib
- District: Ariha District
- Subdistrict: Ariha Nahiyah

Population (2004)
  - Total: 1,992
- Time zone: UTC+2 (EET)
  - Summer (DST): UTC+3 (EEST)
- City Qrya Pcode: C4287

Moataf (Arabic: منطف, also spelled Mantaf) is a Syrian village located in Ariha Nahiyah in Ariha District, Idlib. According to the Syria Central Bureau of Statistics (CBS), Moataf had a population of 1,992 in the 2004 census.

== Syrian Civil War ==
During the a Syrian Government offensive in February 2016, 175 people from Southern Aleppo arrived in the village. Due to a lack of available housing, they were forced to sleep in subdivided chicken coops.
