= Thaheriya =

Thaheriya الظاهرية
- Village
- Country: Syria
- Governorate: Idlib
- District: Ariha District
- Subdistrict: Ariha Nahiyah

Population (2004)
  - Total: 296
- Time zone: UTC+2 (EET)
  - Summer (DST): UTC+3 (EEST)
- City Qrya Pcode: C4272

Thaheriya (Arabic: الظاهرية) is a village in Ariha Nahiyah in Ariha District, Idlib Governorate, in Syria. According to the Syria Central Bureau of Statistics, Thaheriya had a population of 296 in the 2004 census.
