= Bales, Idlib =

Bales, Idlib بالس
- Village
- Location in Syria
- Coordinates: 35°47′24″N 36°25′4″E
- Country: Syria
- Governorate: Idlib
- District: Ariha District
- Subdistrict: Muhambal Nahiyah

Population (2004)
  - Total: 270
- Time zone: UTC+2 (EET)
  - Summer (DST): UTC+3 (EEST)
- City Qrya Pcode: C4314

Bales, Idlib (Arabic: بالس) is a Syrian village located in Muhambal Nahiyah in Ariha District, Idlib. According to the Syria Central Bureau of Statistics (CBS), Bales, Idlib had a population of 270 in the 2004 census.
