= Ebneh =

Ebneh ابنه
- Village
- Country: Syria
- Governorate: Idlib
- District: Ariha District
- Subdistrict: Ariha Nahiyah

Population (2004)
  - Total: 1,097
- Time zone: UTC+2 (EET)
  - Summer (DST): UTC+3 (EEST)
- City Qrya Pcode: C4277

Ebneh (Arabic: ابنه) is a Syrian village located in Ariha Nahiyah in Ariha District, Idlib. According to the Syria Central Bureau of Statistics (CBS), Ebneh had a population of 1097 as of the 2004 census.
