= Al-Badria =

Coordinates: 35.844444°N 36.577778°E

Al-Badria البدرية
- Village
- Location in Syria
- Country: Syria
- Governorate: Idlib
- District: Ariha District
- Subdistrict: Ariha Nahiyah

Population (2004)
  - Total: 84
- Time zone: UTC+2 (EET)
  - Summer (DST): UTC+3 (EEST)
- City Qrya Pcode: N/A

Al-Badria (Arabic: البدرية) is a Syrian village located in Ariha Nahiyah in Ariha District, Idlib. According to the Syria Central Bureau of Statistics (CBS), Al-Badria had a population of 84 in the 2004 census.
