= Majdaliya =

Majdaliya مجدليا
- Village
- Location in Syria
- Coordinates: 35°50′4″N 36°40′38″E
- Country: Syria
- Governorate: Idlib
- District: Ariha District
- Subdistrict: Ariha Nahiyah

Population (2004)
  - Total: 1,429
- Time zone: UTC+2 (EET)
  - Summer (DST): UTC+3 (EEST)
- City Qrya Pcode: C4280

Majdaliya (Arabic: مجدليا) is a Syrian village located in Ariha Nahiyah in Idlib Governorate's Ariha District. According to the Syria Central Bureau of Statistics (CBS), Majdaliya had a population of 1,429 in the 2004 census.
