= Abdita =

Coordinates: 35°43′N 36°32′E

Abdita ابديتا
- Village
- Location in Syria
- Country: Syria
- Governorate: Idlib
- District: Ariha District
- Subdistrict: Ihsim Nahiyah

Population (2004)
  - Total: 1,440
- Time zone: UTC+2 (EET)
  - Summer (DST): UTC+3 (EEST)
- City Qrya Pcode: C4291

Abdita (Arabic: ابديتا) is a Syrian village located in Ihsim Nahiyah in Ariha District, Idlib. According to the Syria Central Bureau of Statistics (CBS), Abdita had a population of 1440 in the 2004 census.
