= Al-Marj, Idlib =

Coordinates: 36°22′N 37°16′E

Al-Marj, Idlib المرج
- Village
- Location in Syria
- Country: Syria
- Governorate: Idlib
- District: Ariha District
- Subdistrict: Muhambal

Population (2004)
  - Total: 547
- Time zone: UTC+2 (EET)
  - Summer (DST): UTC+3 (EEST)
- City Qrya Pcode: N/A

Al-Marj (Arabic: المرج) is a Syrian village located in Muhambal Nahiyah in Ariha District, Idlib. According to the Syria Central Bureau of Statistics (CBS), Al-Marj had a population of 547 in the 2004 census.
