= Kafr Haya =

Coordinates: 35.7564°N 36.5836°E

Kafr Haya كفر حايا
- Village
- Location in Syria
- Country: Syria
- Governorate: Idlib
- District: Ariha District
- Subdistrict: Ihsim Nahiyah

Population (2004)
  - Total: 916
- Time zone: UTC+2 (EET)
  - Summer (DST): UTC+3 (EEST)
- City Qrya Pcode: C4306

Kafr Haya (Arabic: كفر حايا, romanized: Kafr Ḥāyā) is a Syrian village located in Ihsim Nahiyah in Ariha District, Idlib. According to the Syria Central Bureau of Statistics (CBS), Kafr Haya had a population of 916 in the 2004 census.

== Syrian Civil War ==
The residents of Kafr Haya largely supported the Syrian Revolution and several people were killed in June 2011 when troops opened fire on an anti-government protest. The Harmoush Battalion of the Free Officers Movement launched several attacks on a military checkpoint in the village throughout January 2012. On 1 April 2012, the village was bombed by the Syrian regime.
