= Bsames =

Bsames بسامس
- Town
- Location in Syria
- Coordinates: 35°44′14″N 36°30′0″E
- Country: Syria
- Governorate: Idlib
- District: Ariha District
- Subdistrict: Ihsim Nahiyah

Population (2004)
  - Total: 3,638
- Time zone: UTC+2 (EET)
  - Summer (DST): UTC+3 (EEST)
- City Qrya Pcode: C4297

Bsames (Arabic: بسامس) is a Syrian village located in Ihsim Nahiyah in Ariha District, Idlib. According to the Syria Central Bureau of Statistics (CBS), Bsames had a population of 3,638 in the 2004 census.
