= Hila, Idlib =

Coordinates: 35°51′N 36°30′E

Hila, Idlib حيلا
- Village
- Location in Syria
- Country: Syria
- Governorate: Idlib
- District: Ariha District
- Subdistrict: Muhambal Nahiyah

Population (2004)
  - Total: 860
- Time zone: UTC+2 (EET)
  - Summer (DST): UTC+3 (EEST)
- City Qrya Pcode: C4328

Hila, Idlib (Arabic: حيلا) is a Syrian village located in Muhambal Nahiyah in Ariha District, Idlib. According to the Syria Central Bureau of Statistics (CBS), Hila, Idlib had a population of 860 in the 2004 census.
