= Abkally =

Abkally ابقللي
- Village
- Location in Syria
- Coordinates: 35°46′06″N 36°37′54″E
- Country: Syria
- Governorate: Idlib
- District: Ariha District
- Subdistrict: Ariha Nahiyah

Population (2004)
  - Total: 242
- Time zone: UTC+2 (EET)
  - Summer (DST): UTC+3 (EEST)
- City Qrya Pcode: C4270

Abkally (Arabic: ابقللي) is a Syrian village located in Ariha Nahiyah in Ariha District, Idlib. According to the Syria Central Bureau of Statistics (CBS), Abkally had a population of 242 in the 2004 census.
