= Kurin (disambiguation) =

Kurin (Ukrainian: ку́рінь) is a term for various Ukrainian cossacks military units.

Kurin may also refer to:

- Kurin, Syria, a village in Syria
- Kurin District, a district in Iran

As a surname

- Richard Kurin, an American cultural anthropologist
