= Urum al-Jawz =

Urum al-Jawz أورم الجوز
- Town
- Location in Syria
- Coordinates: 35°47′29″N 36°34′2″E
- Country: Syria
- Governorate: Idlib
- District: Ariha
- Subdistrict: Ariha

Population (2004)
  - Total: 4,683
- Time zone: UTC+2 (EET)
  - Summer (DST): +3

Urum al-Jawz (Arabic: أورم الجوز, also called Ouram al-Jawz) is a village in northern Syria, administratively part of the Idlib Governorate, located south of Idlib. Nearby localities include Maataram to the north, Ariha to the northeast, Kafr Latah to the east, Sarja to the southeast, al-Rami to the south and Muhambal to the west. According to the Syria Central Bureau of Statistics, Urum al-Jawz had a population of 4,683 in the 2004 census.
