= Douma chemical attack =

Military operations of the Syrian Civil War involving chemical weapons

- Part of the Rif Dimashq offensive (February–April 2018), Siege of Eastern Ghouta, Syrian civil war
- Type: Chemical warfare, airstrike
- Location: Douma, Rif Dimashq Governorate, Syria; 33°34′16″N 36°24′17″E
- Date: 7 April 2018; 8 years ago 19:30 (UTC+03:00)
- Executed by: Ba'athist Syria; Syrian Air Force (Note: Sources: "OPCW Releases Third Report by Investigation and Identification Team". 27 January 2023. Archived from the original on 27 January 2023.; Third Report by the OPCW Investigation and Identification Team (PDF) (Report). 27 January 2023. pp. 2–139. Archived from the original (PDF) on 27 January 2023 – via OPCW.; "OPCW blames Syria gov't for 2018 chlorine gas attack in Douma". Al Jazeera. 27 January 2023.; "Watchdog blames Syria for 2018 Douma chemical attack". BBC News. 27 January 2023. Archived from the original on 28 January 2023.; Chulov, Martin (27 January 2023). "Syrian regime found responsible for Douma chemical attack". The Guardian. Archived from the original on 27 January 2023.; Loveluck, Louisa (27 January 2023). "Syrian army responsible for Douma chemical weapons attack, watchdog confirms". Washington Post.; Malsin, Jared (27 January 2023). "Assad Regime Carried Out 2018 Chlorine Attack in Syria, Investigators Say". Wall Street Journal.)
- Outcome: US, UK, France launch retaliatory missile strikes
- Casualties: 41–49 reported killed 100–650 injured
- Location of Douma within Syria

On 7 April 2018, a chemical warfare attack was launched in the city of Douma, Syria by the military of the Ba'athist regime led by Bashar al-Assad. Medics and witnesses reported that it caused the deaths of between 40 and 50 people and injuries to possibly well over 100. The attack was attributed to the Syrian Army by rebel forces in Douma, and by the United States, British, and French governments. A two-year long investigation by the Organisation for the Prohibition of Chemical Weapons (OPCW) Investigation and Identification Team (IIT) concluded in January 2023 that the Syrian Air Force perpetrated the attack, dropping two cylinders, one of which hit the rooftop floor of a three-story residential building and released chlorine gas. On 14 April 2018, the United States, France and the United Kingdom carried out a series of military strikes against two alleged chemical weapons facilities of the Syrian government.

== Background ==
According to Organisation for the Prohibition of Chemical Weapons (OPCW) and United Nations investigations, both the Syrian Arab Republic's forces and Islamic State militants have used chemical weapons during the conflict. Human Rights Watch has documented 85 chemical weapons attacks in Syria since 2013, and its sources indicate the Syrian government is responsible for the majority. People reported incidents of chemical weapons use specifically in Douma in January 2018; Russia vetoed a potential United Nations mission to investigate. The Arms Control Association reported two smaller chlorine gas attacks in Douma on 7 March and 11 March.

Douma had been under rebel control since 18 October 2012, and, with the rest of the Eastern Ghouta region, under siege since April 2013. The Rif Dimashq offensive (February–April 2018), code-named Operation Damascus Steel, a military offensive launched by the Syrian Arab Army (SAA) and its allies on 18 February 2018 to capture the rebel-held territory. The Jaysh al-Islam rebel coalition controlled Douma. By mid-March, rebel territory in Eastern Ghouta had reduced to three pockets, one in the south around Hamouria held by Faylaq al-Rahman; a second in the west around Harasta held by Ahrar al-Sham; as well as Douma in the north held by Jaysh al-Islam. In the second half of March, the other two pockets were secured via evacuation deals between the rebels, Syria, and Russia. On 31 March, the last of the evacuations was conducted and the Syrian army declared victory in Eastern Ghouta, while the rebels that were still holding out in Douma were given an ultimatum to surrender by the end of the day.

== Reports ==
A chemical attack in Douma occurred on 7 April 2018. The Union of Medical Care and Relief Organizations, a humanitarian organization that supervises medical services in the region, attributed seventy deaths to the attack. On-site medics reported smelling a chlorine-like odour, but that symptoms and death toll pointed to something more noxious such as sarin nerve agent caused the deaths. A video from the scene showed dead men, women, and children with foam at their mouths. The Syrian American Medical Society (SAMS) reported over 500 injured people at Douma "were brought to local medical centers with symptoms indicative of exposure to a chemical agent." SAMS also said a chlorine bomb struck a Douma hospital, killing six people, and that another attack with "mixed agents" affected a building nearby. According to the Syrian opposition groups, witnesses also reported a strong smell of chlorine and said effects appeared stronger than in previous similar attacks. Syrian opposition activists also posted videos of yellow compressed gas cylinders that they said were used during the attack. Based on the symptoms and the speed with which the victims were affected, medical workers and experts suggested either a combination of chlorine with another gas or a nerve agent was used. Several medical, monitoring, and activist groups—including the White Helmets—reported that two Syrian Air Force Mi-8 helicopters dropped barrel bombs on the city of Douma. The bombs caused severe convulsions in some residents and suffocated others.

On 6 July 2018, an interim report was issued by the OPCW. Various chlorinated organic chemicals (dichloroacetic acid, trichloroacetic acid, chlorophenol, dichlorophenol, bornyl chloride, chloral hydrate etc.) were found in samples, along with residues of explosive, but the designated laboratory 03 stated that no CWC-scheduled chemicals or nerve agent-related chemicals were detected. In September 2018 the United Nations Commission of Enquiry on Syria reported: "Throughout 7 April, numerous aerial attacks were carried out in Douma, striking various residential areas. A vast body of evidence collected by the Commission suggests that, at approximately 7.30 p.m., a gas cylinder containing a chlorine payload delivered by helicopter struck a multi-storey residential apartment building located approximately 100 metres south-west of Shohada square. The Commission received information on the death of at least 49 individuals, and the wounding of up to 650 others."

While it was initially unclear which chemicals had been used, in 2019 the OPCW FFM (Fact-Finding Mission) report concluded: "Regarding the alleged use of toxic chemicals as a weapon on 7 April 2018 in Douma, the Syrian Arab Republic, the evaluation and analysis of all the information gathered by the FFM—witnesses' testimonies, environmental and biomedical samples analysis results, toxicological and ballistic analyses from experts, additional digital information from witnesses—provide reasonable grounds that the use of a toxic chemical as a weapon took place. This toxic chemical contained reactive chlorine. The toxic chemical was likely molecular chlorine." The OPCW said it found no evidence to support the Assad government's claim that a local facility was being used by rebel fighters to produce chemical weapons.

== Aftermath ==
The day after the chemical attack, all rebels controlling Douma agreed to a deal with the government to surrender the area.

In the early hours of 9 April 2018, an air strike was conducted against Tiyas Military Airbase. Two Israeli F-15I jets reportedly attacked the airfield from Lebanese airspace, firing eight missiles, of which five were intercepted, according to claims by Russia. According to the Syrian Observatory for Human Rights monitor, at least 14 people were killed and more were wounded.

On 10 April, member states proposed competing UN Security Council resolutions to handle the response to the chemical attack. The U.S., France, and UK vetoed a Russian-proposed UN resolution. Russia had also vetoed the U.S.'s proposed resolution to create "a new investigative mechanism to look into chemical weapons attacks in Syria and determine who is responsible."

On 14 April, France, the United Kingdom and the United States launched missiles against four Syrian government targets in response to the attack. The strikes were claimed to successfully destroy the chemical weapons capabilities of Syria. Nevertheless, according to Pentagon, the Syrian Arab Republic still retains the ability to launch chemical weapons attacks.

== Investigations and reports ==
=== Media commentary and investigations ===
CBS journalist Seth Doane also traveled to Douma on 16 April, finding the site of the alleged attack where a neighbor reported a choking gas that smelled like chlorine. He took Doane to site of the impact and showed where the remains of a missile rested. Eliot Higgins, a citizen journalist, founder of Bellingcat, and blogger investigating the Syrian civil war, concluded based on geographical, video, and open source evidence that the chlorine gas was dropped by one of two Mi-8 helicopters taking off from Dumayr Airbase 30 minutes earlier. Military officials in the US, UK, and France all insisted the bomb had been dropped from one of two Syrian government helicopters flying from the airbase at Dumayr.

The Guardian reported testimony from witnesses that medical personnel in Douma faced "extreme intimidation" from Syrian officials for them to remain silent about their patients' treatment. They and their families were allegedly threatened by the Syrian government. Medics who tried to leave the area were said to have been heavily searched in case they were transporting samples. The Guardian described Russian state media as "pushing" two lines; that they have spoken to witnesses denying the occurrence of any attacks, and that they have found chlorine-filled canisters in Douma "used for rebel attacks later blamed on the regime."

In June 2018, a New York Times investigation found that Syrian military helicopters dropped a chlorine bomb on the rooftop balcony of an apartment building in Douma. At least 34 victims were counted and their bodies "showed horrific signs of chemical exposure." Dozens of videos and photos were examined with academics, scientists and chemical weapons experts. The New York Times was unable to visit Douma, but forensically analysed the visual evidence from Syrian activists and Russian reports. They collaborated with Forensic Architecture to reconstruct a three-dimensional model of the building, balcony and bomb, and analysed how damage to the bomb's casing related to the debris. According to their findings, key pieces of evidence indicated the bomb was not planted, but dropped from the air by a Syrian military helicopter, and the evidence supported the involvement of chlorine. The dent on the front of the bomb indicated it crashed nose down into the floor of the balcony and pierced the ceiling. The front of the casing showed corrosion similar to that which is caused when metal is exposed to chlorine and water. The grid pattern imprinted on the underside of the bomb matched the metal lattice in the rubble that was over the balcony. Twisted metal found in the rubble corresponded to rigging seen attached to similar weapons. Apparent frost covering the underside of the casing indicated the canister of chlorine was emptied quickly. According to The New York Times, since the Syrian military controlled the airspace over Douma, it would be "almost impossible" for the attack to have been staged by opposition fighters who do not have aircraft. The New York Times noted that remote access "cannot tell us everything", and environmental and tissue samples were also needed in chemical weapons investigations.

The investigations published soon after the fact by Bellingcat, the New York Times, and Forensic Architecture were later confirmed by an in-depth report by James Harkin and Lauren Feeney in The Intercept. After six months of examining the evidence, interviewing witnesses, and consulting with experts such as Higgins and Theodore Postol of the Massachusetts Institute of Technology, Harkin and Feeney concluded that Syrian Air Force helicopters dropped two chlorine canister bombs on Douma on 7 April 2018. Harkin noted that many chlorine attacks launched by Syrian forces in the past had resulted in no casualties, hypothesizing that—in contrast to the much more lethal sarin gas—Syrian forces likely employed chlorine at Douma to induce panic among the population rather than to kill many people. One of the canisters never released its payload and caused no deaths, but the other canister struck the weak roof of an apartment complex at an unexpected angle, releasing a very high concentration of chlorine that killed the people beneath it in a matter of minutes. According to Harkin, the frightened residents seen flocking to a nearby hospital and being doused with water in viral footage were not survivors of the chemical attack, but victims of conventional weapons and smoke inhalation.

A report released by the Global Public Policy Institute (GPPi), a Berlin-based think tank, determined that chlorine attacks accounted for 91.5% of all confirmed chemical weapons attacks attributable to the Syrian government throughout the war, including the 7 April 2018 attack on Douma. The report held the Syrian government responsible for 98% of all recorded chemical weapons attacks over the course of the Syrian civil war and believes its use of chemical weapons "is best understood as part of its overall war strategy of collective punishment of populations in opposition-held areas".

Commenting on the OPCW FFM report of 2019, Bellingcat remarked that the detail provided, 'continues to make it clear that the Douma attack was yet another chlorine attack delivered by helicopter, using the same type of modified gas cylinders as seen in previous chlorine attacks.' On 23 January 2020, Bellingcat published a report in which it argued that it is effectively impossible for the Douma attack to have been a false flag incident.

In December 2024, as the Assad government fell, journalists from the BBC and The Guardian were able to interview witnesses and survivors in Douma, who described how they'd been prevented from speaking in the years since the incident.

=== OPCW investigation ===
On 10 April, the Syrian and Russian governments invited the Organisation for the Prohibition of Chemical Weapons to send a team to investigate the attacks. When the investigators arrived in Damascus on 14 April, their access to the site was blocked by Russia and Syria who cited security concerns.

On 17 April, the OPCW was promised access to the site, but had not entered Douma and was unable to carry out the inspection because a large crowd gathered at one site, while their reconnaissance teams came under fire at the other site. According to the OPCW director, "On arrival at site one, a large crowd gathered and the advice provided by the UNDSS was that the reconnaissance team should withdraw," and "at site two, the team came under small arms fire and an explosive was detonated. The reconnaissance team returned to Damascus." The OPCW statement did not lay blame on any party for the incident. The United States believed the Syrian government was stalling the OPCW to give itself time to remove evidence.

On 19 April, the OPCW still was unable to access the sites. According to a US State Department spokeswoman, there was "credible information" that "Russian officials are working with the Syrian regime to deny and to delay these inspectors from gaining access to Douma," and "to sanitize the locations of the suspected attacks and remove incriminating evidence of chemical weapons use."

OPCW inspectors visited the site and collected samples on 21 April and 25 April 2018. The organization said that it would submit to its member states a report "based on analysis of the sample results, as well other information and materials collected by the team."

At the warehouse and the facility suspected by the authorities of the Syrian Arab Republic of producing chemical weapons in Douma, information was gathered to assess whether these facilities were associated with the production of chemical weapons or toxic chemicals that could be used as weapons. From the information gathered during the two on-site visits to these locations, there was no indication of either facility being involved in the production of chemical warfare agents or toxic chemicals for use as weapons. During the visit to Location 2 (cylinder on the roof), Syrian Arab Republic representatives did not provide the access requested by the OPCW Fact-Finding Mission (FFM) team to some apartments within the building, which were closed at the time. The Syrian Arab Republic representatives stated that they did not have the authority to force entry into the locked apartments.

On 6 July 2018, the FFM published its interim report. The report stated that:

The results show that no organophosphorous nerve agents or their degradation products were detected in the environmental samples or in the plasma samples taken from alleged casualties. Along with explosive residues, various chlorinated organic chemicals were found in samples from two sites, for which there is full chain of custody.

In March 2019, the OPCW FFM final report concluded:

Regarding the alleged use of toxic chemicals as a weapon on 7 April 2018 in Douma, the Syrian Arab Republic, the evaluation and analysis of all the information gathered by the FFM—witnesses' testimonies, environmental and biomedical samples analysis results, toxicological and ballistic analyses from experts, additional digital information from witnesses—provide reasonable grounds that the use of a toxic chemical as a weapon took place. This toxic chemical contained reactive chlorine. The toxic chemical was likely molecular chlorine.

The OPCW said it found no evidence to support the government's claim that a local facility was being used by rebel fighters to produce chemical weapons. It was not the mandate of the fact-finding team to assign blame for the attack.

An engineering report written by Ian Henderson, a liaison officer at the OPCW Command Post Office in Damascus, was leaked in 2019. According to his report, there was a "higher probability that both cylinders were manually placed at those two locations rather than being delivered from aircraft".

In November 2019, Fernando Arias reaffirmed his defense of the FFM report, saying of differing views: "While some of these diverse views continue to circulate in some public discussion forums, I would like to reiterate that I stand by the independent, professional conclusion [of the investigation]."

Russia threatened to block the budget for the OPCW at the annual meeting in The Hague in 2019 if it included funding for a new team which would give the organisation powers to pin blame on culprits for the use of toxic arms. Previously the watchdog only had a mandate to say whether or not an attack had occurred. Russia, Iran and China led efforts to block the budget in 2018 but it passed by a majority of 99–27. "Moscow has consistently raised doubts over chemical attacks in Syria or insisted they were staged, and has recently highlighted a leaked report raising questions about a deadly chlorine attack in the Syrian town of Douma in April 2018. Tensions have also been high since four Russian spies were expelled from the Netherlands in 2018 for allegedly trying to hack into the OPCW's computers." On 28 November 2019 the bid by Russia to block funding for a new team that will identify culprits behind toxic attacks in Syria failed with member states at the global chemical watchdog overwhelmingly approving a new budget.

On 17 January 2020, Bellingcat published a report in which it said it had found problems with Henderson's engineering assessment.

In February 2020, Fernando Arias, the Director-General of the OPCW, shared the findings of an independent investigation into possible breaches of confidentiality which was initiated after the leak. The investigation took place between July 2019 and February 2020. The investigators determined that two former OPCW officials, referred to as Inspector A and Inspector B, violated their obligations concerning the protection of confidential information related to the Douma investigation. According to the investigators, Inspector A was not a member of the FFM, played a minor supporting role in the Douma investigation, and did not have access to all information gathered by the FFM team – including witness interviews, laboratory results, and analyses by independent experts. After the July 2018 interim report, it had taken a further seven months for the FFM to further investigate the incident and conduct the bulk of its work, and Inspector A no longer had any supporting role regarding the FFM during this period. According to the investigators, the assessment of Inspector A was an unofficial personal document created with incomplete information and without authorisation. Inspector B was a member of the FFM for the first time and travelled to Syria in April 2018. He never left the command post in Damascus because he had not completed the training necessary to deploy on-site. The majority of the FFM's work occurred after Inspector B separated with the OPCW at the end of August 2018. During a briefing in February 2020 to State Parties to the Chemical Weapons Convention, Fernando Arias said:

Inspectors A and B are not whistle-blowers. They are individuals who could not accept that their views were not backed by evidence. When their views could not gain traction, they took matters into their own hands and breached their obligations to the Organisation. Their behaviour is even more egregious as they had manifestly incomplete information about the Douma investigation. Therefore, as could be expected, their conclusions are erroneous, uninformed, and wrong.

=== OPCW-IIT Findings ===
The third report published on 27 January 2023 by the OPCW Investigation and Identification Team (IIT) concluded that the Syrian Armed Forces were responsible for the chemical attack. (Note: Sources: "OPCW Releases Third Report by Investigation and Identification Team". 27 January 2023. Archived from the original on 27 January 2023.; Third Report by the OPCW Investiogation and Identification Team (PDF) (Report). 27 January 2023. pp. 2–139. Archived from the original (PDF) on 27 January 2023 – via OPCW.; "Joint Statement on OPCW Report Finding Syrian Regime Responsible for Chemical Weapons Attack in Douma, Syria on April 7, 2018". U.S. Department of State. 27 January 2023. Archived from the original on 28 January 2023.; "OPCW blames Syria gov't for 2018 chlorine gas attack in Douma". Al Jazeera. 27 January 2023.; "Watchdog blames Syria for 2018 Douma chemical attack". BBC News. 27 January 2023. Archived from the original on 28 January 2023.; Chulov, Martin (27 January 2023). "Syrian regime found responsible for Douma chemical attack". The Guardian. Archived from the original on 27 January 2023.; Loveluck, Louisa (27 January 2023). "Syrian army responsible for Douma chemical weapons attack, watchdog confirms". Washington Post.) The OPCW-IIT findings concluded:

"between 19:10 and 19:40 (UTC +3) on 7 April 2018, during a major military offensive aimed at regaining control of the city of Douma, at least one Syrian Air Force Mi-8/17 helicopter, departing from Dumayr airbase and operating under the control of the Tiger Forces, dropped two yellow cylinders which hit two residential buildings in a central area of the city. At Location 2, the cylinder hit the rooftop floor of a three-storey residential building without fully penetrating it, ruptured, and rapidly released toxic gas—chlorine—in very high concentrations, which rapidly dispersed within the building killing 43 named individuals and affecting dozens more."

In a joint press release published by the US Department of State on the same day, the Foreign Ministers of United States, UK, France and Germany thanked the OPCW for its "independent, unbiased, and expert" research and denounced the Syrian government for its continuing violations of Chemical Weapons Conventions, stating:

"Our governments condemn in the strongest terms the Syrian regime's repeated use of these horrific weapons..Syria must fully declare and destroy its chemical weapons program and allow the deployment of OPCW staff to its country to verify it has done so... IIT also obtained information that, at the time of the attack, the airspace over Douma was exclusively controlled by the Syrian Arab Air Force and the Russian Aerospace Defence Forces. We call on the Russian Federation to stop shielding Syria from accountability for its use of chemical weapons. No amount of disinformation from the Kremlin can hide its hand in abetting the Assad regime."

== Reactions ==
=== Government ===
France – On 12 April, French President Emmanuel Macron said he has proof that the Syrian government attacked the town of Douma with chemical weapons and at least used chlorine.

Iran – The Foreign Ministry of Iran spokesman said: "While the Syrian army has the upper hand in the war against armed terrorists, it is not logical for them to use chemical weapons. Such claims and accusations [about chemical weapons use] by the Americans and some Western countries signal a new plot against the government and nation of Syria and is an excuse for military action against them."

Qatar – The Qatar Foreign Ministry condemned the use of chemical weapons, and called for an investigation into the incident and for punishment of those involved.

Russia – On 13 March 2018 the Chief of the General Staff of the Russian Armed Forces, Valery Gerasimov, said the Russian military had "reliable intelligence" that suggested the rebels holding Eastern Ghouta, along with the White Helmets activists, were preparing to stage and film a chemical weapons attack against civilians, which the U.S. government would blame on the Syrian forces and use as a pretext to bomb the government quarter in Damascus. In the event that the lives of Russian servicemen should be threatened by U.S. strikes, Gerasimov said Russia would respond militarily—"against both the missiles and the platforms from which they're launched". The Russian Foreign Ministry on 8 April denied chemical weapons had been used. A few days later, the Russian military said members of the White Helmets organization filmed a staged attack. Then, on 13 April, the Russian Ministry of Defence said that it was Britain that staged the attack in order to provoke U.S. airstrikes. On 26 April, Russian officials held a press conference in The Hague where they presented several apparent witnesses from the Douma incident, flown in from Syria, who said that reported victims had not suffered symptoms of a chemical attack. The Russian envoy to the OPCW said that videos of the attack were little more than "a sloppily staged video showing the pretence for a strike is completely groundless". On 20 January 2020, Russia convened a UN Security Council (UNSC) Arria meeting (not treated as formal council business) where it presented the view that there was no evidence that chemical weapons were used in Douma. Ian Henderson appeared via video. The ambassador from Germany compared the presentation to Alice in Wonderland.

Saudi Arabia – The Ministry of Foreign Affairs condemned the use of chemical weapons, and stress the need for a peaceful solution based on the principles of the Geneva Declaration and UN Security Council resolutions.

Syria – The Syrian state-owned Syrian Arab News Agency reported a Foreign and Expatriates Ministry source saying that Syria's alleged use of "chemical weapons have become an unconvincing stereotype, except for some countries which traffic with the blood of civilians and support terrorism in Syria."

Turkey – A spokesman for President Recep Tayyip Erdoğan said the "Syrian regime must give account for the attacks in various regions of the country at different times," and called upon the international community to address war crimes and crimes against humanity.

United Kingdom – Foreign Secretary Boris Johnson said that "these latest reports must urgently be investigated and the international community must respond" and that "investigators from the Organisation for the Prohibition of Chemical Weapons [are] looking into reports of chemical weapons use in Syria have our full support. Russia must not yet again try to obstruct these investigations". He also condemned the use of chemical weapons in general, adding that "those responsible for the use of chemical weapons have lost all moral integrity and must be held to account."

United States – President Donald Trump condemned the attack on Twitter, heavily criticizing Russia over it. Trump canceled his trip to the 8th Summit of the Americas, sending Vice President Mike Pence in his place. On 10 April, Trump, UK Prime Minister Theresa May, and French President Emmanuel Macron said in a statement following joint telephone calls that they had "agreed that the international community needed to respond to uphold the worldwide prohibition on the use of chemical weapons". On 11 April, via Twitter, President Trump told Russia to "get ready" for "nice and new and 'smart' missiles." Vasily Nebenzia, Russia's ambassador to the United Nations, said the United States would "bear responsibility" for any "illegal military adventure" they conducted. The following day, Trump appeared to soften his resolve, tweeting he "[n]ever said when an attack on Syria would take place. Could be very soon or not so soon at all!" U.S. Defense Secretary James Mattis stated the U.S. was still waiting on the OPCW investigation, but that there were "a lot of media and social media indicators that either chlorine or sarin was used" in Douma. The BBC quoted U.S. officials as saying urine and blood samples taken from victims had tested positively for traces of chlorine. On 14 April, France, the United Kingdom and the United States launched airstrikes against four Syrian government targets in response to the attack.

=== Intergovernment ===
European Union – In a statement, the EU said "the evidence points towards yet another chemical attack by the regime" and "it is a matter of grave concern that chemical weapons continue to be used, especially on civilians. The European Union condemns in the strongest terms the use of chemical weapons and calls for an immediate response by the international community". It also called for the United Nations Security Council to identify the perpetrators and for Russia and Iran to influence Assad against launching such attacks.

United Nations – On 10 April 2018, the United Nations Security Council failed to adopt three competing resolutions on an inquiry into the chemical attack, with Russia and the United States clashing over the issue and exchanging military threats.

World Health Organization – The WHO released a statement, with a reference to outside medical sources, that 43 people died while suffering "symptoms consistent with exposure to highly toxic chemicals."

== See also ==
- List of massacres during the Syrian civil war
- List of Syrian civil war barrel bomb attacks
- Syria chemical weapons program
