= Maarbalit =

Maarbalit معربليت
- Village
- Location in Syria
- Coordinates: 35°48′27″N 36°39′45″E
- Country: Syria
- Governorate: Idlib
- District: Ariha District
- Subdistrict: Ariha Nahiyah

Population (2004)
  - Total: 2,178
- Time zone: UTC+2 (EET)
  - Summer (DST): UTC+3 (EEST)
- City Qrya Pcode: C4285

Maarbalit (Arabic: معربليت also spelt Ma'rablit or Maarablit) is a Syrian village located in Ariha Nahiyah in Ariha District, Idlib. According to the Syria Central Bureau of Statistics (CBS), Maarbalit had a population of 2,178 in the 2004 census.

== Syrian Civil War ==
In February 2018, the Syrian Liberation Front reportedly captured the town from Tahrir al-Sham. At least 1 person was killed and 4 wounded in an artillery strike on Maarbalit that occurred on April 25, 2023. Government forces shelled the village on August 1, 2023, killed a four year old boy. Many people were displaced over the course of the conflict, though about 200 residents are said to have returned to the village in August 2023.
