= Shinan, Syria =

Village in Ariha, Syria

Schnann (Arabic: شنان) is a village located in the eastern side of Jebel az-Zawiya in Syria. It is located about 30 km to the south of Idlib and north-west of Maarrat al-Nu'man at a distance about 13 km in very rugged terrain. It is in the administrative district of Ariha. According to the Syria Central Bureau of Statistics, Schnann had a population of 2,025 in the 2004 census.

== Architecture ==
The houses are a mixture of Byzantine, Roman and early Islamic heritage and AlGhams (mud) houses that were prevalent in the late Ottoman epoch. Modern buildings are built on the sides of a valley from east to west.

== Archaeology ==
Schnann village contains many archaeological sites belonging mostly to the Romans and Byzantines. Umm Serfos was a station for the caravans that went from Ebla to Ugarit. Its impacts are visible in a highland area west of the village. It operates as a summer resort because it remains cool in the summer and offers a beautiful view to Eastern region of the village.

The village contains many Roman tombs carved in the rock and hidden in caves. It also contains a plate carved in the rock with a painting of Nero, with a lion and a young girl.

== Economy ==
The primary occupation is agriculture, despite the severe ruggedness of its terrain. A main crop is apricot trees. Production reached more than 75 tons of apricots in 2008.

== Services ==
The village hosts two schools for basic education (first cycle and second cycle), a branch for Consumption (Cooperative) Society, a mosque, a pharmacy. Electricity, water and telephone services are present.
