= Douma massacre (2015) =

Syrian Air Force airstrike of Douma during the Syrian Civil War

2015 Douma massacre
- Part of Syrian Civil War
- Location: 33°34′20.15″N 36°24′06.52″E; Douma, Syria
- Date: 16 August 2015
- Target: Civilians
- Attack type: Airstrike
- Weapons: Missiles, Barrel bombs
- Deaths: 96+
- Injuries: 200+
- Perpetrator: Syrian Air Force

On August 16, 2015, the Syrian Air Force launched strikes on the rebel-held city of Douma, northeast of Damascus, killing at least 96 people and injuring at least 200 others. It was one of the deadliest attacks to have occurred during the Syrian Civil War.

== The bombing ==
According to the Syrian Observatory for Human Rights, four separate missiles were fired in the strikes, which struck the main market in the town during rush hour. Initial airstrikes were reportedly followed shortly afterwards by surface-to-surface missiles which hit people who had rushed to the scene to help.

I entered the market and the corpses were scattered everywhere, human remains thrown on the produce and vegetables, and under every box of tomatoes was a corpse or part of a corpse.

— Bassam al-Hakeem, a Douma-based photographer

The bodies of sixty of the massacre victims were buried in two mass graves on the night of August 16.

== Reactions ==
Rami Abdurrahman, head of the Syrian Observatory for Human Rights described the air strikes as "an official massacre that was carried out deliberately." A Syrian military source told Reuters that the country's air force had carried out strikes in Douma and Harasta that targeted the headquarters of the rebel group Jaysh al-Islam.

The Turkey-based Syrian political opposition group, the National Coalition for Syrian Revolutionary and Opposition Forces, said the attack aimed at inflicting as many civilian casualties as possible.

Stephen O'Brien, the United Nations' most senior humanitarian official, said he was horrified by the attacks and reiterated that "attacks on civilians are unlawful, unacceptable and must stop." Jeffrey Feltman, the UN political chief, told the U.N. Security Council that Sunday's attack "would be yet one more war crime for which those responsible must be held accountable." United Nations envoy Staffan de Mistura called the attacks "unacceptable", to which Syria responded by accusing him of "stray[ing] from neutrality".

The massacre was also condemned by Britain, France, Germany and Qatar.

=== Official Statements ===
- Qatar – The Qatari Ministry of Foreign affairs said in a statement "that the Assad regime's continuation to commit crimes against innocent civilians in flagrant defiance of human conscience and international law increases the complexity of the Syrian crisis, and puts significant obstacles to reaching a political solution to the crisis. It also impedes the international efforts to achieve political transition based on Geneva statement of June 30, 2012."
- United Nations – Rupert Colville, spokesman for the UN High Commissioner for Human Rights, said in a press release that the attacks "may amount to a war crime for which individuals can be held criminally responsible."
- United States – The attacks were also condemned by the State Department of the United States, which issued a press release stating that the attacks "demonstrate the [Assad] regime’s disregard for human life."

== See also ==
- Aerial bombardment and international law
- List of massacres during the Syrian Civil War
- List of Syrian Civil War barrel bomb attacks
