= Sarja, Syria =

Sarja سرجة
- Village
- Location in Syria
- Coordinates: 35.5814°N 36.9256°E
- Country: Syria
- Governorate: Idlib
- District: Ariha District
- Subdistrict: Ariha Nahiyah

Population (2004)
  - Total: 3,845
- Time zone: UTC+2 (EET)
  - Summer (DST): UTC+3 (EEST)
- City Qrya Pcode: C4273

Sarja (Arabic: سرجة) is a Syrian village located in Ariha Nahiyah in Ariha District, Idlib. According to the Syria Central Bureau of Statistics (CBS), Sarja had a population of 3,845 in the 2004 census.
