= Najiyeh =

Najiyeh الناجية
- Village
- Location in Syria
- Coordinates: 35°47′24″N 36°12′51″E
- Country: Syria
- Governorate: Idlib
- District: Jisr al-Shughur District
- Subdistrict: Bidama Nahiyah

Population (2004)
  - Total: 4,424
- Time zone: UTC+2 (EET)
  - Summer (DST): UTC+3 (EEST)
- City Qrya Pcode: C4233

Najiyeh (Arabic: الناجية) is a Syrian village located in Bidama Nahiyah in Jisr al-Shughur District, Idlib. According to the Syria Central Bureau of Statistics (CBS), Najiyeh had a population of 4424 in the 2004 census.
