= Al-Rami =

Al-Rami الرامي
- Town
- Location in Syria
- Coordinates: 35°46′3″N 36°33′32″E
- Country: Syria
- Governorate: Idlib
- District: Ariha District
- Subdistrict: Ihsim Nahiyah

Population (2004)
  - Total: 4,983
- Time zone: UTC+2 (EET)
  - Summer (DST): UTC+3 (EEST)
- City Qrya Pcode: C4294

Al-Rami (Arabic: الرامي) or Rami (Arabic: رامي), is a town in northern Syria, administratively part of the Idlib Governorate, located south of Idlib. According to the Syria Central Bureau of Statistics (CBS), Al-Rami had a population of 4,983 in the 2004 census.
