= Douma, Syria =

City in Syria

Douma دُومَا
- City
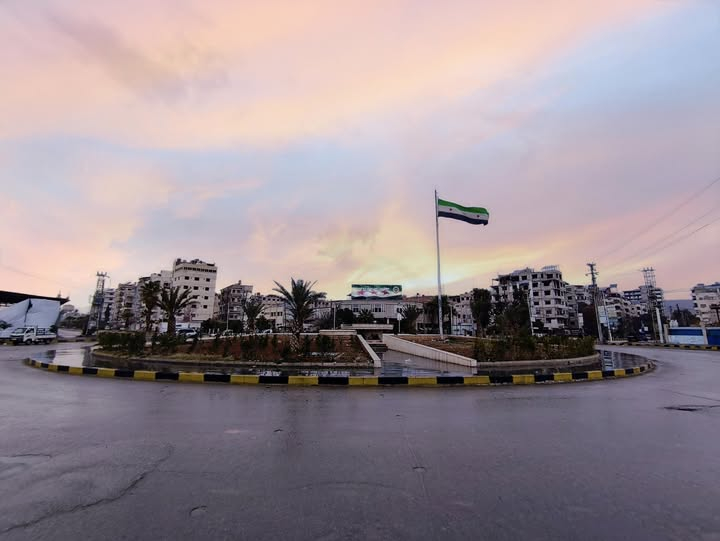
- Douma in 2025
- Interactive map of Douma
- Location in Syria Douma (Eastern Mediterranean)
- Coordinates: 33°34′16″N 36°24′04″E
- Country: Syria
- Governorate: Rif Dimashq
- District: Douma District
- Subdistrict: Douma Subdistrict
- Elevation: 428 m (1,404 ft)

Population (2004 census)
  - Total: 110,893
- Demonym(s): Arabic: دوماني, romanized: Doumani; Arabic: دوميّ, romanized: Doumi
- Time zone: UTC+3 (AST)
- Geocode: C2338
- Climate: BSk

Douma or Duma (Arabic: دُومَا, romanized: Dūmā) is a city in Syria. Its centre is about 10 km (6 mi) northeast of the centre of Damascus. Being a part of Rif Dimashq Governorate, the city is also the administrative centre of Douma District. Douma is a major city of the region known as Ghouta, for the peri-urban settlements to the east and south of Damascus.

== History ==
=== City in the Syrian civil war (2012–2018) ===
During the Syrian Civil War, Douma was a major flashpoint and witnessed numerous demonstrations against the Syrian government and armed clashes against the Syrian Army and security forces during the early stages of the conflict.

On 30 January 2012, the Syrian Army gained control of the city after the Battle of Douma, a major operation against the opposition armed groups in Rif Dimashq Governorate.

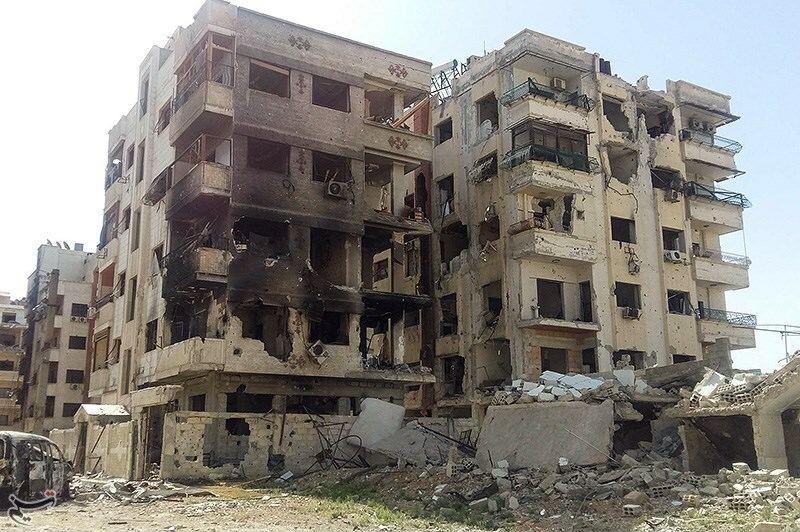
Douma after its recapture by the Syrian Arab Army in 2018

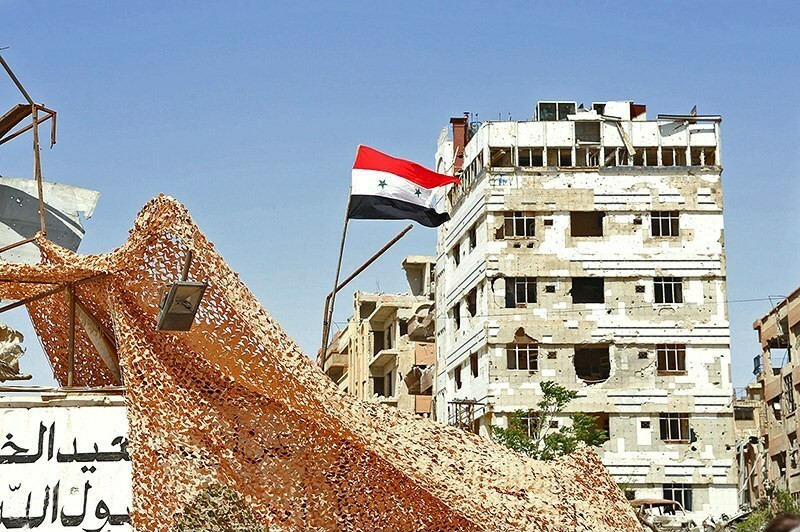
Douma after its recapture by the Syrian Arab Army in 2018

On 29 June 2012, the Syrian Army was accused of committing a massacre in Douma, where more than 50 people were killed.

As of 18 October 2012, the Free Syrian Army was in control of most of the suburb. Fighting and bombardments continued in the town.

Douma was the main city of the Siege of Eastern Ghouta which began in April 2013, isolating 400,000 people in a 100 square kilometre area. UN and Red Cross aid convoys were able to reach Douma with food and supplies once in 2018.

In the 2015 Douma market massacre, the city was attacked by Syrian Army ground-to-ground missiles, leaving at least 50 dead and several more missing.

In early 2018, the main rebel faction based in the city was Saudi Arabian-backed Jaysh al-Islam (Army of Islam), with an estimated 10-15,000 fighters in the region.

On 7 April 2018, a chemical attack was carried out in the city. Douma had been the target of bombing campaigns over four months in 2018, as Syrian Air Force forces intensified their aerial bombardment before launching a ground offensive. The last and deadliest, according to medics and rescue workers, occurred when a yellow industrial gas cylinder was reportedly dropped onto the balcony of a block of flats. The opposition's surrender came a day later. After that, Syrian Army recaptured the city.

In September 2018, the UN Commission of Enquiry on Syria reported: "Throughout 7 April, numerous aerial attacks were carried out in Douma, striking various residential areas. A vast body of evidence collected by the Commission suggests that, at approximately 7.30 p.m., a gas cylinder containing a chlorine payload delivered by helicopter struck a multi-storey residential apartment building located approximately 100 metres southwest of Shohada square. The Commission received information on the death of at least 49 individuals and the wounding of up to 650 others... the Commission cannot make yet any conclusions concerning the exact causes of death, in particular on whether another agent was used in addition to chlorine that may have caused or contributed to deaths and injuries" Local rebels and civilians were sent into northern Syria in forced exile. Similar forced displacement deals have taken place all over Syria.

=== Rehabilitation of the city and its liberation (2018–present) ===
During the 2021 Syrian presidential election, then-Syrian President Bashar al-Assad and First Lady Asma al-Assad cast their votes in the city of Douma.

Between 2018 and 2023, around 108,000 people also returned to the city and its surroundings. In 2022, the emergency hospital was inaugurated. Also in 2022, Syrian Telecom Center was reopened after its restoration, with cost of SYP 2.5 billion. By 2024, a number of reconstruction works was launched. Street lightning, a temporary provincial health center, 23 out of 33 schools of all types, and an automated bakery have been restored. Also, the tunnels left by militant organizations under many government institutions and buildings were filled, and constructions rehabilitated. In addition, by the end of 2024, a new provincial hospital in the city will be opened.

On 7 December 2024, the city was liberated by rebel forces.

== Geography ==
Douma is the largest city located in the settlement slush in the Ghouta oasis that surrounds Damascus from the south and east. Around the city of Douma is the strategic M5 Highway connecting Damascus with the north of the country and across the Syrian Desert and also with Iraqi capital Baghdad.

=== Climate ===
Douma has a cold semi-arid climate (Köppen climate classification BSk).

Climate data for Douma
Month	Jan	Feb	Mar	Apr	May	Jun	Jul	Aug	Sep	Oct	Nov	Dec	Year
Mean daily maximum °C (°F)	12.1 (53.8)	14.0 (57.2)	18.1 (64.6)	22.9 (73.2)	28.5 (83.3)	33.3 (91.9)	35.5 (95.9)	35.6 (96.1)	32.1 (89.8)	26.8 (80.2)	19.8 (67.6)	14.0 (57.2)	24.4 (75.9)
Daily mean °C (°F)	6.8 (44.2)	8.1 (46.6)	11.5 (52.7)	15.4 (59.7)	20.1 (68.2)	24.2 (75.6)	26.0 (78.8)	26.0 (78.8)	22.8 (73.0)	18.5 (65.3)	12.9 (55.2)	8.5 (47.3)	16.7 (62.1)
Mean daily minimum °C (°F)	1.5 (34.7)	2.3 (36.1)	4.9 (40.8)	8.0 (46.4)	11.7 (53.1)	15.1 (59.2)	16.6 (61.9)	16.5 (61.7)	13.5 (56.3)	10.2 (50.4)	6.1 (43.0)	3.1 (37.6)	9.1 (48.4)
Average precipitation mm (inches)	33 (1.3)	39 (1.5)	20 (0.8)	13 (0.5)	7 (0.3)	0 (0)	0 (0)	0 (0)	0 (0)	8 (0.3)	25 (1.0)	40 (1.6)	185 (7.3)
Source: Climate-Data.org

== See also ==
- 2018 bombing of Damascus and Homs (April 2018)
- Cities and towns during the Syrian civil war
