= Bab al-Nairab =

Coordinates: 36°11′39″N 37°09′58″E

Bab al-Nairab (Arabic: بَاب النَّيْرَب, romanized: Bāb an-Nayrab, also spelled Bab al-Nayrab) meaning the "Gate of al-Nayrab", was one of the nine historical gates of the Ancient City of Aleppo in northern Syria, but has since disappeared. Its name refers to the nearby village of al-Nayrab (currently a suburb of Aleppo) as the gate led towards the village. Today, the city district where the gate used to stand is commonly called Bab al-Nairab, but is officially known as Muhammad Bek.

== History ==
The Bab al-Nairab gate was built sometime during the period of 1216–1237 in the southeastern part of the ancient city by the Ayyubid ruler of Aleppo, al-Aziz Muhammad, son of predecessor az-Zahir Ghazi. The latter had planned its construction but al-Aziz carried it out following az-Zahir's death. The new gate marked the southward expansion of Aleppo during az-Zahir's rule. It was the starting point of the main route that led to the village of al-Nayrab. The name "Nairab" itself was derived from the Syriac word of Narb, meaning the plain land.

Beginning in the late Mamluk period in the 15th century, Aleppo developed links with the surrounding countryside through the Bab al-Nairab area. It served as the initial destination point for agricultural and pastoral products from the surrounding villages before being transported to the city's markets. During the Ottoman era, local peasants and Bedouins settled Bab al-Nairab, which had developed into a quarter. Many of the peasants had been uprooted from the countryside, while the Bedouin were semi-sedentary nomads who lived in the district during winter. Although Bab al-Nairab's generally poor population was Muslim, it was also ethnically diverse, including Arabs, Kurds and Turkmen. Along with Banqusa, Bab al-Nairab became one of the most powerful quarters of Aleppo, where the countryside immigrants and the merchants of the caravan trade held sway and could influence the public order as well as the urban tax system.

=== Modern era ===
Bab al-Nairab had a population of some 12,000 in the first quarter of the 20th century. Residents of the neighborhood resisted conscription efforts by the Arab government of King Faisal which briefly held power in Syria after the collapse of Ottoman control in 1917–18. Bab al-Nairab later played a significant role in the Syrian resistance movement against the French who were attempting to consolidate control over the country in 1919. The leaders of two prominent clans in the neighborhood, Abd al-Fatah al-Baytar and Kanju Hamada, along with several members of the prominent al-Berri clan and a number of lesser families formed a large militia consisting of an infantry, a cavalry and a machine-gun unit. On 3 July 1920, the French Army gained control over Aleppo, but Bab al-Nairab's inhabitants continued to put up token resistance for a short while longer.

As part of a series of urban development projects in Aleppo during the presidency of Hafez al-Assad, large parts of the Bab al-Nairab district were demolished to make way for new roads constructed through the Old City. Many of the city's residents welcomed the plans, but a significant campaign, which attracted the support of a number of public figures, was launched against the demolitions. In 1977 the campaign successfully lobbied the Syrian Board of Antiquities to classify Bab al-Nairab as a historical landmark and a committee for the preservation of the district was established. Nonetheless, several leading members of the ruling Ba'ath Party and the governor of Aleppo insisted that the development plans were to move forward for the purpose of modernization. This conflict coincided with a tense period in Aleppo in light of the conflict between the outlawed Syrian Muslim Brotherhood and the authorities.

Large-scale demolitions in Bab al-Nairab took place during the spring of 1979 and the summer of 1982. Further development schemes did not take place following UNESCO's labeling of the entire Old City, including Bab al-Nairab, as a World Heritage Site. However, the activities of the Syrian Board of Antiquities and UNESCO were mostly focused on conserving the Bab al-Faraj quarter, and not Bab al-Nairab.

Today, Bab al-Nairab is a large and densely populated neighborhood situated at and around the southeastern border of the Old City. The part of the neighborhood outside the walls of the Old City is known to be a "popular" or lower-class area. It is officially named Muhammad Bek district. According to the Syria Central Bureau of Statistics, Muhammad Bek had a population of 16,771 in the 2004 census.

Intense fighting in the district between rebels from the Free Syrian Army (FSA) and the native pro-government al-Berri tribe took place in Bab al-Nairab in early August 2012 within the frames of the Syrian Civil War. The clashes were sparked by the FSA's execution of tribal leader Zeino al-Berri which prompted a statement from the al-Berri tribe promising retaliation against the FSA. According to Associated Press reporting, the neighborhood was shelled by the Syrian Army on 25 September 2012. Further shelling was reported on 4 October by the Syrian Observatory for Human Rights, a human rights activist group.

== Bibliography ==
- Antoun, Richard T. (1991). Syria: Society, Culture, and Polity. SUNY Press. ISBN 0791407136.
- Fawaz, Leila Tarazi (1995). An Occasion for War: Civil Conflict in Lebanon and Damascus in 1860. University of California Press. ISBN 0520200861. "Bab Nayrab Ottoman."
- Gelvin, James L. (1999). Divided Loyalties: Nationalism and Mass Politics in Syria at the Close of Empire. University of California Press. ISBN 0520210700.
- Gonzalez, Alfonso Carmona (2006). El sufismo y las normas del Islam: Trabajos del IV Congreso Internacional de Estudios Jurídicos Islámicos, Derecho y Sufismo, Murcia. Editora Regional de Murcia. ISBN 847564323X.
- Jayyusi, Salma Khadra (2008). The City in the Islamic World. Vol. 1. BRILL. ISBN 978-9004171688.
- Morray, D. W. (1994). An Ayyubid Notable and His World: Ibn Al-ʻAdīm and Aleppo as Portrayed in His Biographical Dictionary of People Associated with the City. BRILL. ISBN 9004099565.
- Rabbo, Annika (2005). A Shop of One's Own: Independence and Reputation among Traders in Aleppo. I.B. Tauris. ISBN 1850436835.
- Tabbaa, Yasser (1997). Constructions of Power and Piety in Medieval Aleppo. Penn State Press. ISBN 0271015624.
