= Ein Shib =

Ein Shib عين شيب
- Village
- Location in Syria
- Country: Syria
- Governorate: Idlib
- District: Idlib District
- Subdistrict: Idlib Nahiyah

Population (2004)
  - Total: 2,415
- Time zone: UTC+2 (EET)
  - Summer (DST): UTC+3 (EEST)
- City Qrya Pcode: C3868

Ein Shib (Arabic: عين شيب) is a Syrian village located in Idlib Nahiyah in Idlib District, Idlib. According to the Syria Central Bureau of Statistics (CBS), Ein Shib had a population of 2415 in the 2004 census.
