= Al-Mastumah =

Al-Mastumah المسطومة
- Village
- Location within Syria
- Coordinates: 35°52′28″N 36°37′52″E
- Country: Syria
- Governorate: Idlib
- District: Idlib
- Subdistrict: Idlib

Population (2004)
  - Total: 6,243
- Time zone: UTC+2 (EET)
  - Summer (DST): UTC+3 (EEST)
- Climate: Csa

Al-Mastumah or Al Mastoume (Arabic: المسطومة) is a village in northern Syria, administratively part of Idlib Governorate, located 7 kilometers south of Idlib and 60 kilometers southwest of Aleppo. Nearby localities include Faylun to the west, Qmenas to the northeast, al-Nayrab to the east and Ariha to the south. According to the Syria Central Bureau of Statistics, al-Mastumah had a population of 6,243 in the 2004 census.

== History ==
Excavations of the tell have identified humans living here in the Bronze and neolithic ages, however the area is principally known as an Iron Age settlement. The tell at Mastuma is 18 metres high and 200 metres in diameter. It was excavated by a Japanese archaeological team between 1980 and 1995.

=== Iron Age ===
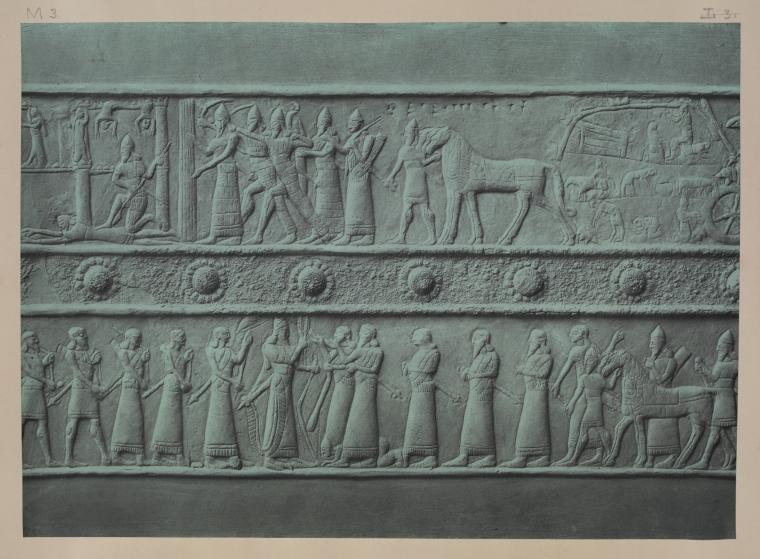
Capture of Astamaku, near Al-Mastumah, described on the Balawat Gates

Al-Mastumah is near the site of the Iron Age I settlement of Astamaku (also known as Tell Mastuma). Astamaku is five kilometres south of the town of Idlib. Of the roughly 90 cities Assyrian king Shalmaneser III claimed to have conquered in the Aramaean kingdom of Hamath, Astamaku was the only one mentioned by name on the Balawat Gates. The city was fortified and was taken over in 848 BCE by a force of Assyrian archers according to the images on the gates. It was also the farthest city in Hamath that Shalmaneser conquered during his military campaign. The border settlement had streets and small dwellings that suggest that the town had a governor but mostly housed the small families of members of the garrison.

=== Modern era ===
Al-Mastumah was described as "a village in green surroundings" by author Robert Boulanger in the 1960s. He also noted the village's "mound-shaped houses", then a common feature of north Syrian localities. The houses were made of mud brick and had cone-shaped roofs.

During the ongoing Syrian civil war, in January 2013, heavy fighting took place between opposition rebels and pro-government forces in al-Mastumah. According to the Syrian Observatory for Human Rights (SOHR), an unknown number of people were killed during the clashes or executed. The village's Ba'ath Party camp was reportedly converted to a detention center in 2011 and contains a weapons arsenal and tanks. The pro-opposition Local Coordination Committees (LCC) claimed that 70 people were killed in the Idlib region whilst forces fought for control of al-Mastumah. Revenge attacks by al-Nusra of two suicide attacks and a bombing on government military targets identified the number of people killed by the Syrian government in Al-Mustumah as 100. On 19 May 2015, after several days of violent clashes, an Islamist rebel alliance called the Army of Conquest captured Al-Mastumah, after Syrian military forces were forced to withdraw.

== Bibliography ==
- Boulanger, Robert (1966). The Middle East: Lebanon, Syria, Jordan, Iraq, Iran. Hachette.
- Avi-Yonah, Michael (1942). Syria and the Lebanon. Steimatzky's Publishing Company.
- Bryce, Trevor (2013). The Routledge Handbook of the Peoples and Places of Ancient Western Asia: The Near East from the Early Bronze Age to the Fall of the Persian Empire. Routledge. ISBN 9781134159086.
- Lipinsky, Edward (2000). The Aramaeans: Their Ancient History, Culture, Religion. Peeters Publishers. ISBN 9789042908598.
