= Ihsim Subdistrict =

Ihsim Subdistrict ناحية إحسم
- Nahiyah
- Location in Idlib Governorate

- Location in Syria
- Country: Syria
- Governorate: Idlib
- District: Ariha District

Population (2004)
  - Total: 65,409
- Time zone: UTC+2 (EET)
  - Summer (DST): UTC+3 (EEST)
- Nahya pcod: SY070501

Ihsim Subdistrict (Arabic: ناحية إحسم) is a Syrian nahiyah (subdistrict) located in Ariha District in Idlib. According to the Syria Central Bureau of Statistics (CBS), Ihsim Subdistrict had a population of 65,409 in the 2004 census.
