= Ariha Subdistrict =

Ariha Subdistrict ناحية مركز أريحا
- Nahiyah
- Location in Idlib Governorate

- Location in Syria
- Coordinates: 35°48′24″N 36°36′37″E
- Country: Syria
- Governorate: Idlib
- District: Ariha District

Population (2004)
  - Total: 83,487
- Time zone: UTC+2 (EET)
  - Summer (DST): UTC+3 (EEST)
- Nahya pcod: SY070500

Ariha Subdistrict (Arabic: ناحية مركز أريحا) is a Syrian nahiyah (subdistrict) in Ariha District in Idlib. According to the Syria Central Bureau of Statistics (CBS), Ariha had a population of 83,487 in the 2004 census. As of July 2023, the subdistrict has an estimated population of 110,734, of whom 32,666 were IDPs from other parts of Syria.
