= Ariha District =

Ariha District منطقة أريحا
- District
- Map of Ariha District within Idlib Governorate
- Coordinates (Ariha): 35°49′N 36°36′E
- Country: Syria
- Governorate: Idlib
- Seat: Ariha
- Subdistricts: 3 nawāḥī

Area
  - Total: 603.27 km^{2} (232.92 sq mi)

Population (2004)
  - Total: 175,994
  - Density: 291.73/km^{2} (755.59/sq mi)
- Geocode: SY0705

Ariha District (Arabic: منطقة أريحا, romanized: manṭiqat Arīḩā) is a district of the Idlib Governorate in northwestern Syria. Administrative centre is the city of Ariha. At the 2004 census, the district had a population of 175,994.

== Sub-districts ==
The district of Ariha is divided into three sub-districts or nawāḥī (population as of 2004):

- Ariha Subdistrict (ناحية أريحا): population 83,487.
- Ihsim Subdistrict (ناحية إحسم): population 65,409.
- Muhambal Subdistrict (ناحية محمبل): population 27,098.
