= Barish al-Shamali =

Barish al-Shamali باريش
- Village
- Nicknames: Barish North, Berrish North
- Location in Syria
- Coordinates: 36°11′00″N 36°34′50″E
- Country: Syria
- Governorate: Idlib
- District: Harem District

Barish al-Shamali (Arabic: باريش) is a village in northwestern Syria, in Harem District. It is located about 2 kilometers north of Qalb Lozeh and contains the remains of a church and a building that is possibly an andron. It is one of the Dead Cities.

== Archaeological Remains ==
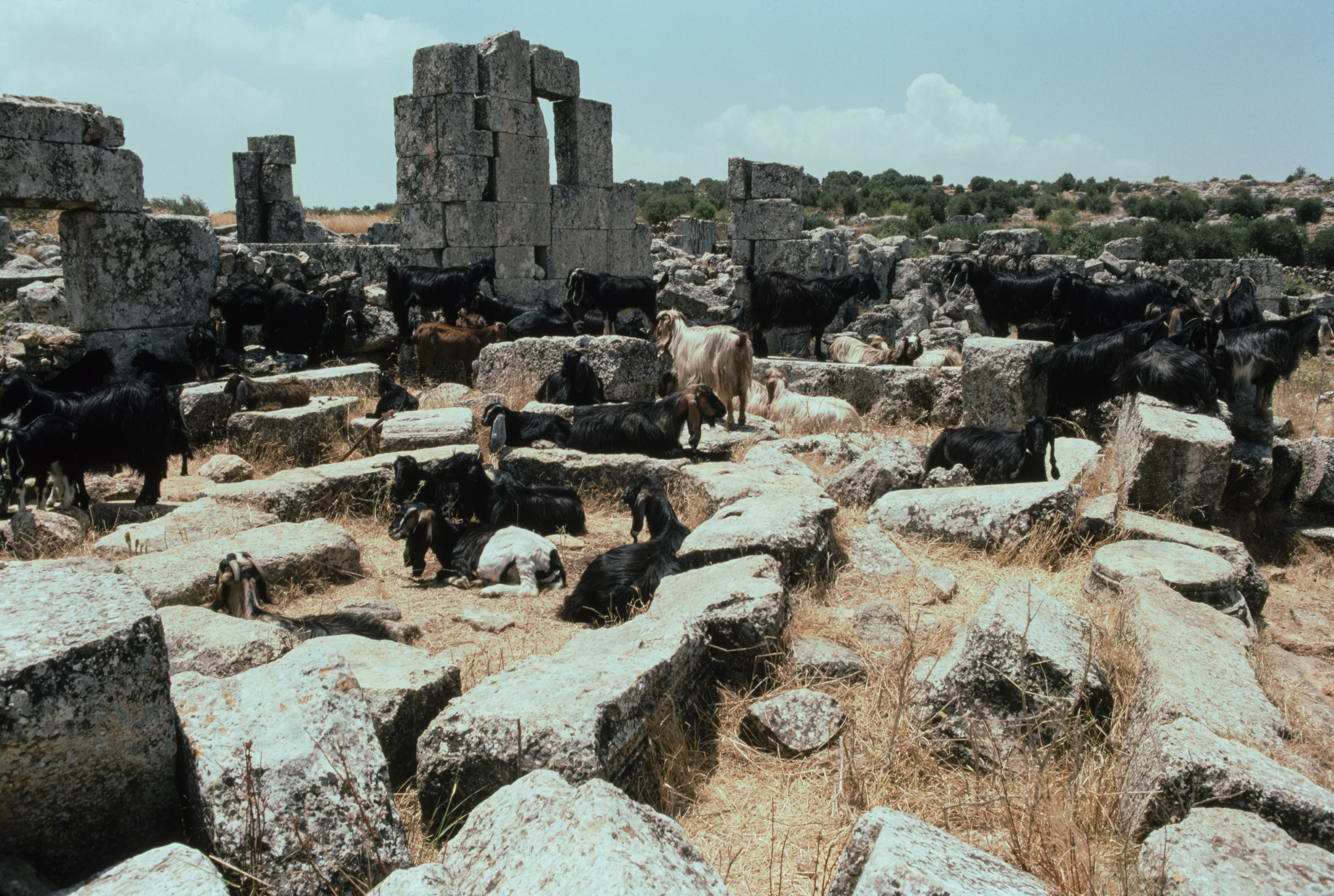
Church, Berrish North (باريش), Syria – Interior view with bema, facing southwest – PHBZ024 2016 5341 – Dumbarton Oaks

The three-aisled church at Barish al-Shamali sits close to the road running between Qalb Lozeh and Harim. It is noted for its square-shaped apse and preserved bema. Holes in the bema suggest that it once served as a base for a wooden upper structure. The sanctuary is well-defined by the presence of reliquaries built into the steps, which is also found at Qarqbizeh. There is also a martyrium south of the altar and the church is dated around 600 CE.

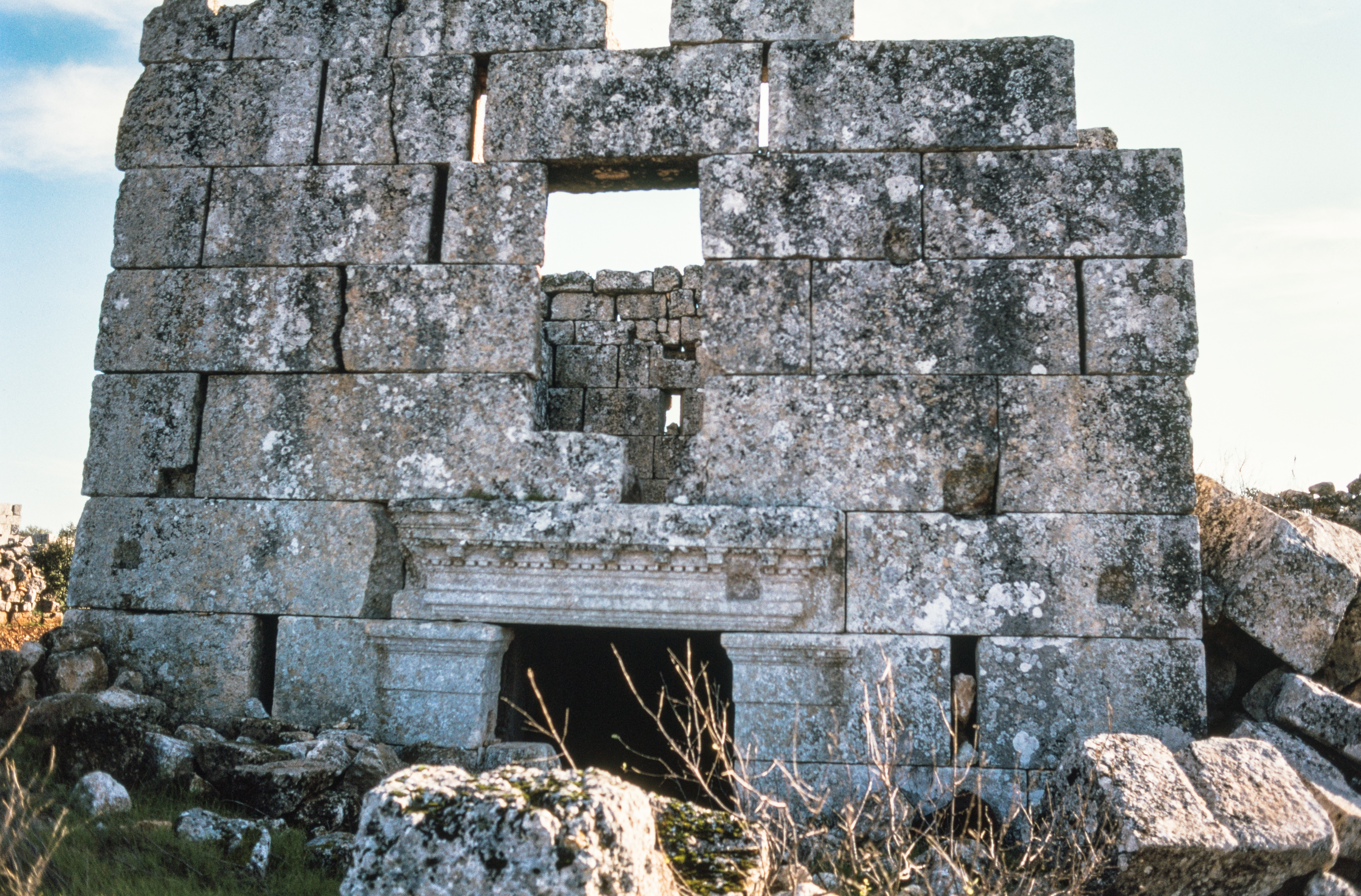
Andron

Also located at the site is a two-story building, dated to the third century CE. According to an inscription on the pilasters framing the north entrance, the building was built in 231 CE. The upper story features a paved room accessible by three doors, one on the front and two on the sides. There is also a staircase that leads to a raised outdoor platform, accessible by the three doors. On the ground floor, longitudinal arches rest on two pillars in the first room, with the second room featuring two pillars that support the first floor. The ground story likely served as a storage area. The use and purpose of this building is still indefinite, but as the doorway opens directly to the outside, rather than into a courtyard, it is presumed to not be a dwelling but rather a public building. Another consideration is the longitudinal plan of the building: other structures that have possibly been identified as androns, such as the buildings at Serjilla and Me'ez follow a transverse, rather than longitudinal, layout. As a public building, this structure could have been used as a banquet hall, a storeroom, or as a meeting place.
