= Andronik =

Andronik is a Russian and Armeninan male given name derived from Greek Andronikos. Notable people with the name include:

- Andronik Iosifyan
- Andronik Karagezyan
- Andronik Nikolsky
- Andronik Rudenko
- Andronik Stepovych
- Andronik of Moscow, the namesake of the Andronikov Monastery, Moscow

== See also ==
- Andron
- Andronic
