= Maryna Paliienko =

Ukrainian historian in the field of archival studies

- Born: 27 January 1968 (age 58); Kyiv, Ukrainian SSR
- Education: Taras Shevchenko National University of Kyiv
- Known for: chair of the Department of Archival Studies at the Historical Faculty of the Kyiv University chief editor of „Ukrainian Archives“
- Awards: 2006 Book of the Year award for history
- Scientific career
- Fields: Archival science
- Workplaces: Taras Shevchenko National University of Kyiv

Maryna Hennadiivna Paliienko (Ukrainian: Марина Геннадіївна Палієнко; born 27 January 1968 in Kyiv) is a contemporary Ukrainian historian in the field of archival studies. Since 2017, she is the chair of the Department of Archival Studies and Special Fields of Historical Science at the Historical Faculty of the Kyiv University. Since 2020, she is the chief editor of „Ukrainian Archives“, a leading Ukrainian journal on archival studies.

== Biography ==
Maryna Paliienko was born in Kyiv in 1968. She studied at the Historical Faculty of the Kyiv University (1985-1990). In the early 1990s, she briefly worked at the Central State Archives of Supreme Bodies of Power and Government of Ukraine, before proceeding with graduate studies.

She obtained a PhD (Candidate of Sciences) degree in history in 1994, with the doctoral thesis focused on the role of Kievskaya starina сhronicle in the scientific and civic life of the Ukrainian society. In 2009, she obtained a Doctor of Sciences degree, presenting her second dissertation centered on the archival centers of Ukrainian immigrants in Europe in the 1920s to the 1940s.

Since 1994, Paliienko has been working at the Historical Faculty of the Taras Shevchenko National University of Kyiv. She first worked as an assistant professor, before becoming an associate professor in 2011, and a professor in 2012. Since 2017, she leads the Department of Archival Studies and Special Fields of Historical Science.

== Scientific career ==
In her scientific work, Maryna Paliienko focuses on comparative archival studies; the history of archives and archival collections in Ukraine and across the world; historical source criticism; archaeography; historiography; media history; Ukrainian social and political history of the 19th and 20th centuries; Ukrainian immigrants and diaspora in Europe and North America.

Paliienko researched Ukrainian studies in multiple countries, including the United Kingdom, France, Czech Republic, Russia, Austria, Poland, and Germany. She was a visiting scholar at the Ukrainian Free University in Munich (1995 and 1996), as well as in the Nicolaus Copernicus University in Toruń (2018). Paliienko presented her work at multiple international scientific conferences, particularly in Toruń, Paris, Prague, London, Trieste (Italy), and Maribor (Slovenia).

She is a member of the International Institute for Archival Science (Trieste and Maribor), as well as various academic councils at Taras Shevchenko National University of Kyiv, Vernadsky National Library of Ukraine, State Archive Service of Ukraine, Central State Archives of Foreign Archival Ucrainica, and Symon Petliura library in Paris.

Since 2020, she has been the chief editor of „Ukrainian Archives“, a leading Ukrainian journal on archival studies.

Paliienko is the author of almost 200 scientific works. In 2006, her book on the Kievskaya starina сhronicle was recognized as one of the best books of the year in the field of history by the Ukrainian national award „Book of the Year“.
