= Andron =

Andron (Ancient Greek: Ἄνδρων) is the name of a number of persons in classical antiquity:

- Andron of Alexandria, a writer whose work entitled The Years (Χρονικὰ) is referred to by Athenaeus around the late 2nd century BCE.
- Andron of Catania, an ancient semi-legendary dancer and music composer.
- Andron of Ephesus, who wrote a work on the Seven Sages of Greece, which seems to have been titled Tripod (Τρίπους).
- Andron of Halicarnassus, a Greek historian who was mentioned by Plutarch in conjunction with Hellanicus.
- Andron of Teos, an ancient writer, and author of a work titled Circumnavigation (Περίπλους), who is probably the same person as the one referred to by Strabo, Stephanus of Byzantium, and others. He may also have been the same as the author of About Affinity (Περὶ Συγγενειῶν).
- Andron, an ancient sculptor, whose age and country are unknown. He was known to have made a statue of Harmonia, the daughter of Mars and Venus.
- Andron (physician), an ancient Greek physician.

== See also ==
- Andronikos
- Andronik
- X-Andron
