= Nikolay V. Storozhenko =

Ukrainian-born Russian nationalist

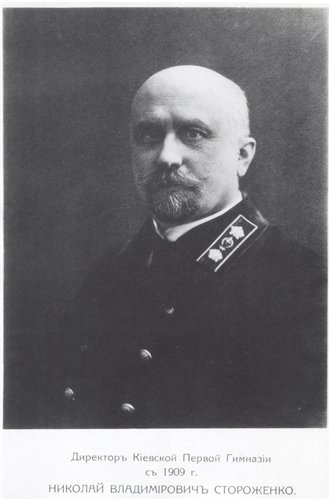
Director of the Kiev First Gymnasium since 1909, Mykola Volodymyrovych Storozhenko

Nikolay Vladimirovich Storozhenko (Russian: Никола́й Влади́мирович Стороже́нко) was a Ukrainian-born Russian nationalist, social and political activist, historian and an educator. He was a member of the Kiev Club of Russian Nationalists (1908–1918). After Revolution he emigrated to Yugoslavia and then to France. He is known as an author of many works on the Cossack history of Ukraine and Russia.

He is a graduate of Saint Vladimir Royal University of Kiev and a student of Volodymyr Antonovych. Storozhenko was a member of the Kiev Archaeographic Commission, the Nestor the Chronicler Historic Association and other history related organizations; a contributing editor of Kievskaya starina and number of other Russian history related magazines and periodicals.

He belonged to an old Cossack family of Storozhenko. He had a brother Andrey Storozhenko who also was a historian specialized in Slavic studies.

== Family ==
Since 1901, he was married to Princess Varvara Davidovna Zhevakhova.
