= Dura-Europos church =

Oldest known Christian house church

Coordinates: 34.745829°N 40.727958°E

- Isometric drawing of the church

- Location within Syria
- Location: Dura-Europos
- Country: Syria
- Denomination: Early Christianity

History
- Status: Inactive
- Founded: 233; 1793 years ago

Architecture
- Functional status: Ruins (possibly destroyed)
- Style: House church
- Completed: 233 AD
- Demolished: 256 AD (abandoned)

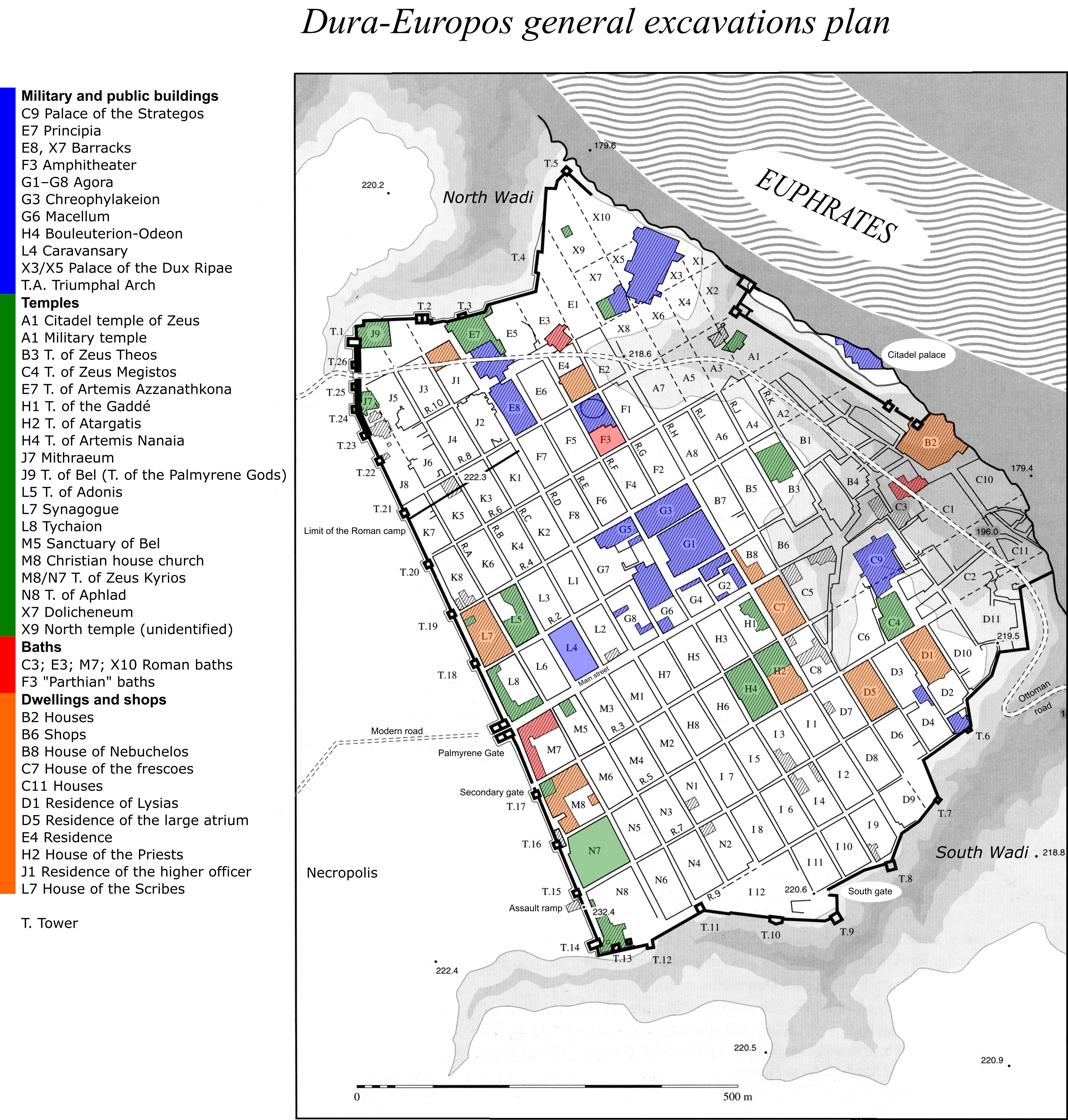
Location of the church in Dura-Europos, marked as M8

The Dura-Europos church (or Dura-Europos house church) is the earliest identified Christian house church. It was located in Dura-Europos, Syria, and one of the earliest known Christian churches. It is believed to have been an ordinary house that was converted to a place of worship between 233 and 256 AD, and appears to have been built following the Durene tradition, distinguished by the use of mud brick and a layout consisting of rooms encircling a courtyard, which was characteristic of most other homes built in the Dura-Europos region. Prior to the town being abandoned in 256 during the Persian siege, the Romans built a ramp extending from the city wall which buried the church building in a way that allowed for the preservation of its walls, enabling its eventual excavation by archaeologists in 1933. It was less famous, smaller, and more-modestly decorated than the nearby Dura-Europos synagogue, though there are many similarities between them.

The church was uncovered by a French-American team of archaeologists during two excavation campaigns in the city from 1931–32. The frescos were removed after their discovery and are preserved at Yale University Art Gallery.

The fate of the church after the occupation of Syrian territory by ISIL during the Syrian Civil War is unknown; it is assumed the building was destroyed.

== History ==
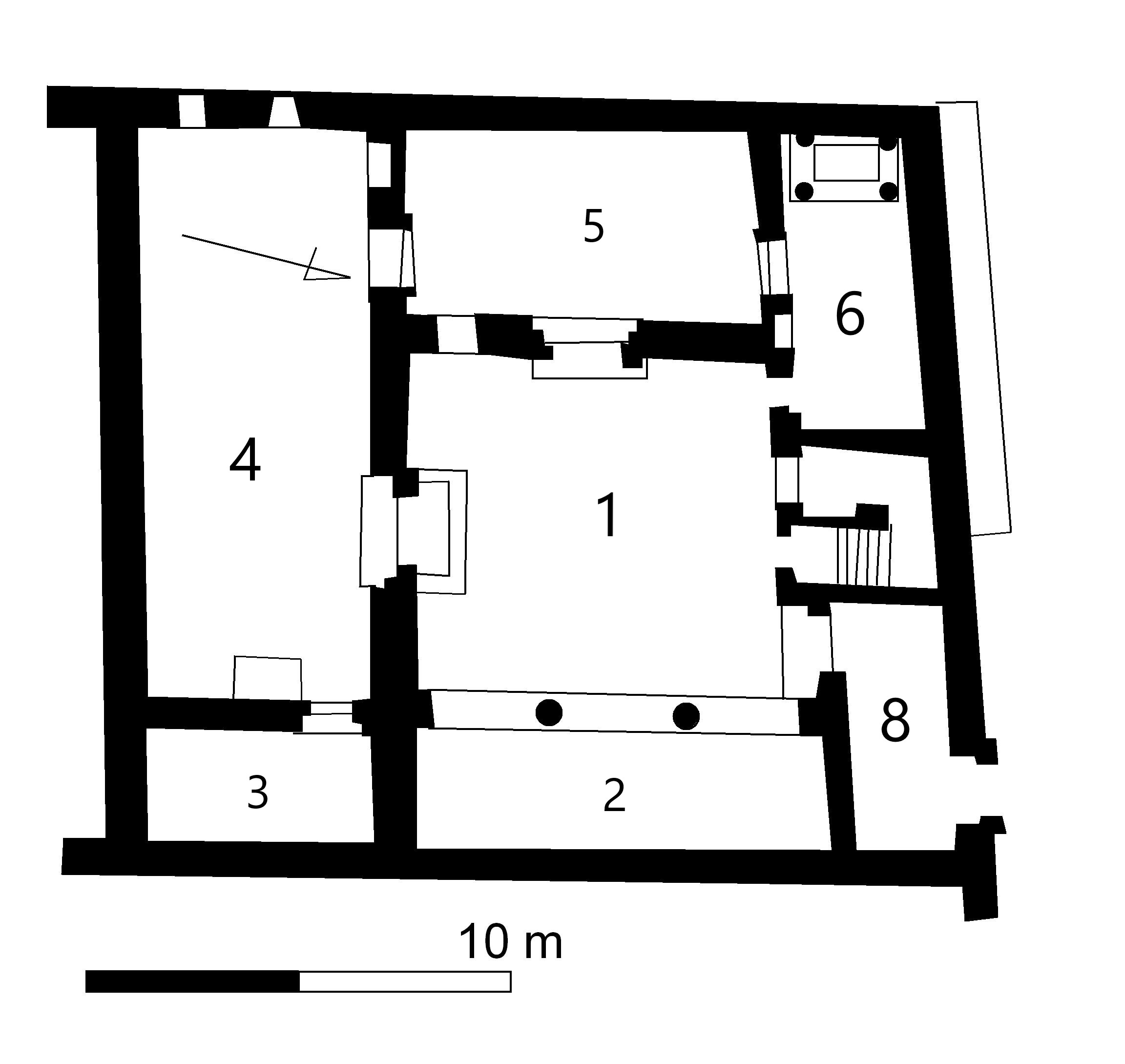
Church plan. Above right is the baptistery.

The Christian chapel at Dura-Europos was a domus ecclesiae that occupied an old, private dwelling in the ancient city's M8 block, along the western rampart of the city, opposite Gate 17, a short distance south of the main door. This house's layout is typical of local domestic architecture; it had a square, central courtyard around which the various rooms were arranged. Access from the street was though a modest door.

The building's construction was dated using an inscription on the plaster that showed the date 232/233. The inscription was made on a wet plaster and later covered over. The house was probably built on a plot of undeveloped land; it was a little larger than the average size used for individual residences in Dura. The building was trapezoidal, and measured approximately 17.4 m (57 ft) from east to west, and between 18.6 and 20.2 m (61 and 66 ft) from north to south. The islet M8 was briefly occupied by a building—probably a private house—during the first century AD but was destroyed by the beginning of second century, judging by the significant thickness of the abandonment layer 1.3 m (4.3 ft) covering its remains. The construction of a first dwelling on the islet came after the Roman occupation of 165, and was followed by other constructions in the years of strong urban growth accompanying the military reinforcement of the city (209-211). The house was bordered by other buildings on the east side but the area to the south remained vacant. The conversion to a Christian church probably occurred in 240/241.

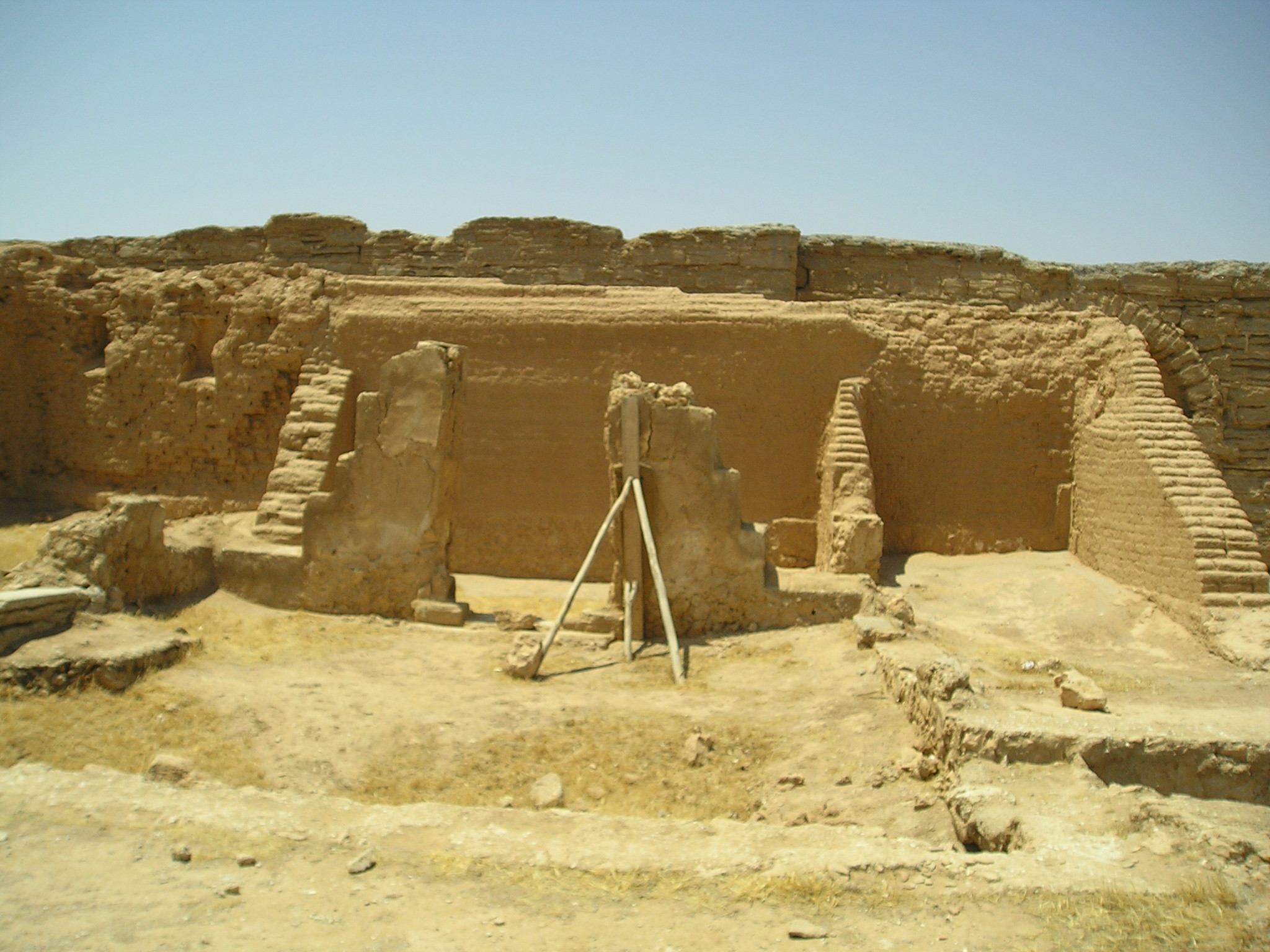
From the inner courtyard to the remains of the rooms to the west. In the background the city wall.

The new building was about 17.4 m (57 ft) long and 19 m (62 ft) wide, and was close to the city wall, from which it was separated by a street. The house consisted of a peristyle with living rooms on all four sides. In the north was the entrance into an anteroom that led into the peristyle, which had two columns on the east side. Some rooms were 5.22 m (17.1 ft) high and other rooms were probably about 4 m (13 ft) high. There was a staircase to the roof and a small basement.

=== Conversion to a church ===
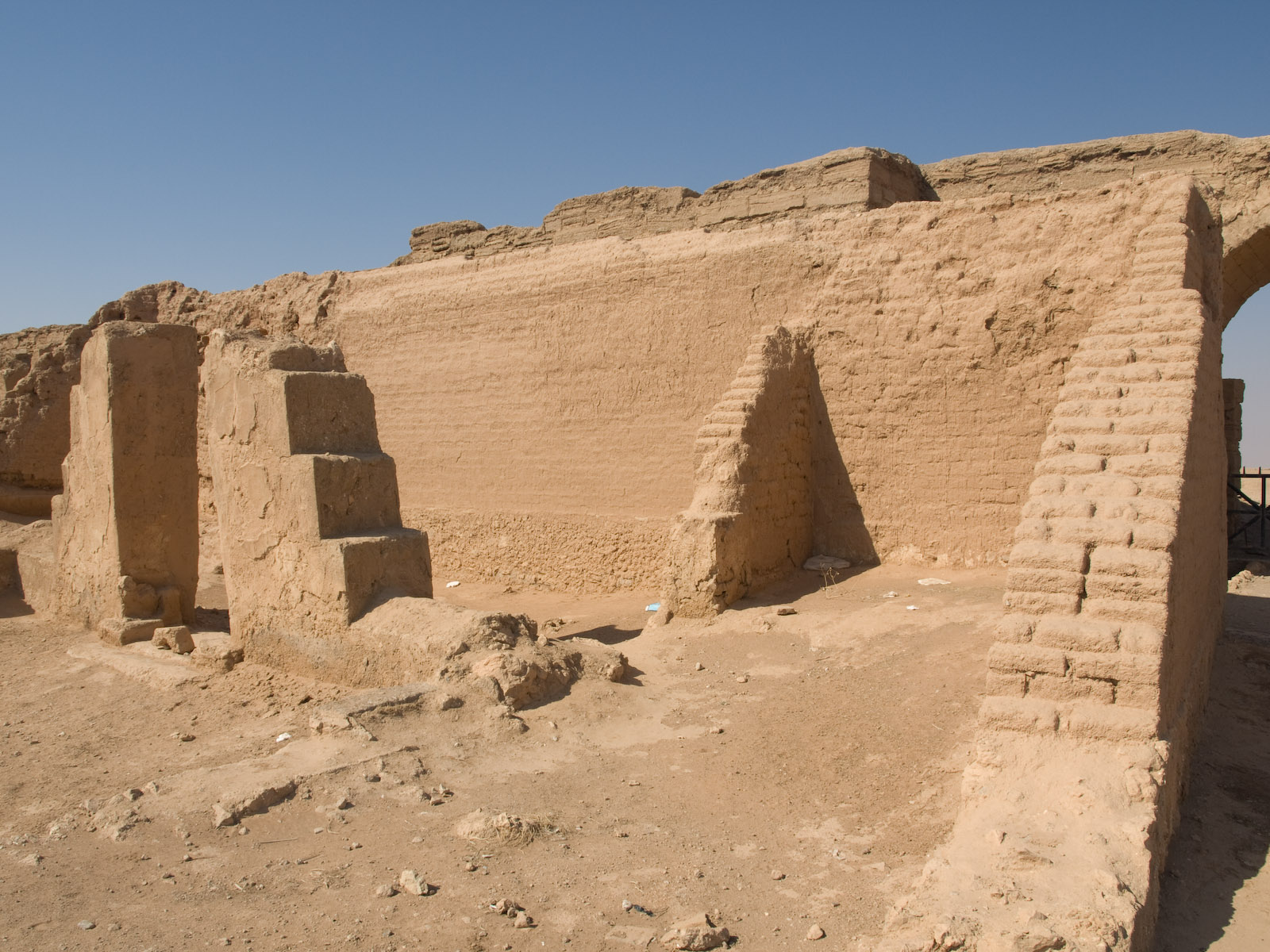
The remains of the former house church in 2008.

During the conversion of the private house into a church, a wall between two small rooms was demolished to make space for the large assembly room. This signified the shift to "church houses", which were more permanently adapted for religious use. As noted in The Oxford History of Christian Worship; "one of the larger rooms served as a baptistry, another for the celebration of the Eucharist, and a third possibly for the instruction of catechumens".

The house seems to have been converted in one campaign, and mainly concerned the west and south parts of the building. The first room from the street (Room 8, approximately 5.7 m × 2.5 m (18.7 ft × 8.2 ft), in the northeast corner of the building, served as a vestibule. It opened with a passage monumentalized by an arch in the courtyard, two steps below. This almost-square space 7.7 m × 7.7 m × 8.55 m (25.3 ft × 25.3 ft × 28.1 ft) was renovated; the ground was raised by 0.08 m (3.1 in) and covered with cinder, plaster, and tiles, removing in the operation a small basin to collect rainwater that was previously located in the northwest corner. A low, narrow masonry bench 0.5 m × 0.42 m (1.6 ft × 1.4 ft) was built along the west, north, and south walls. It was preceded by a step- in front of stairwell 7 and the door to room 6. The east side of the courtyard opened onto a portico of two columns with a diameter of 0.75 m (30 in) equally spaced. It measures approximately 9 m × 2.65 m (29.5 ft × 8.7 ft). The columns make it possible to estimate the height of the ceiling in rooms 2 and 3 at around 4 m (13 ft). In the middle of the south side of the courtyard opens a 1.6-metre (5.2 ft) monumental door, which was the main access to the south wing of building.

Originally, this included the house's triclinium, the largest room, about 8 m × 5.15 m (26.2 ft × 16.9 ft) that served as a dining room (room 4A). High ceiling (about 5.07 m); it was also raised above the courtyard almost 0.5 m (1.6 ft) and included a peripheral masonry bench covered with a plaster coating. A brazier was located immediately to the right of the entrance. A small door in the northeast corner was the only access to a secondary room in the southeast corner of the house (room 3), which was probably a utility or storage room for this dining room. Another door in the northwest corner of room 4A opened to a room 4B, which was probably also a utility room.

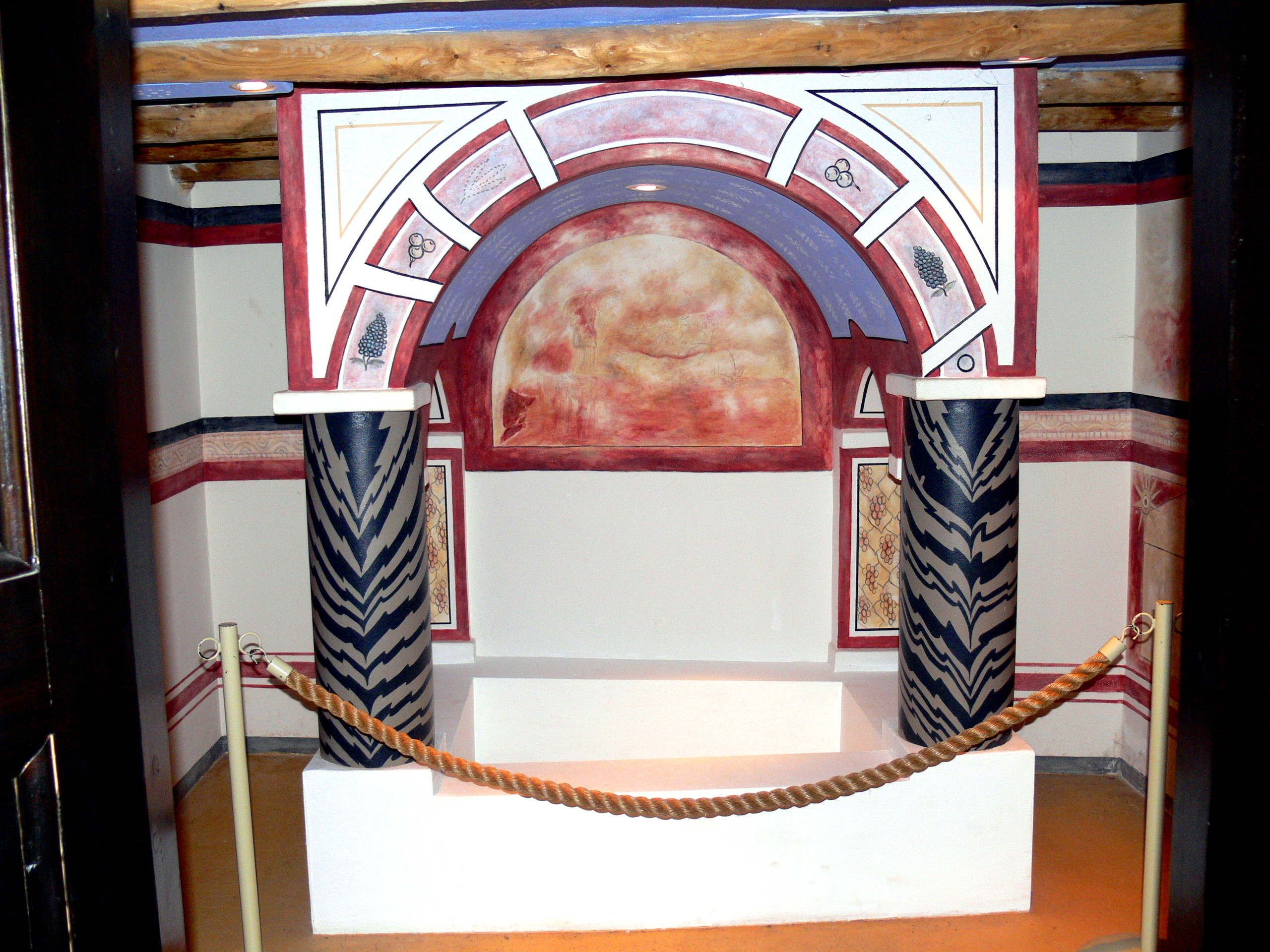
Modern reconstruction of the canopy in the baptistry.

During the conversion, the two rooms 4A and 4B were joined to form a large, rectangular room 12.9 m × 5.15 m (42.3 ft × 16.9 ft), the floor of which is raised by back-filling the previous one to a height of the seat. On the east side, a platform was set up against the partition wall separating the new room from room 3, which was preserved: this platform would have accommodated a lectern for a reader or a cathedral. A hole in the ground next to it would have accommodated the base of a lamp. A window was cut into the wall facing the courtyard, just north of the gate. This large room was the Christian community's meeting room.

In the house's north wing, room 5, which was approximately 7.5 m × 4.2 m (25 ft × 14 ft) and together with room 6 at the north-west corner, formed the private quarters of the house—perhaps the gynaeceum. A window was pierced in the south-eastern wall, and the doorway leading to room 6 to the north had a careful decoration that was unusual for an interior door. Room 6 was about 6.8 m × 3.15 m (22.3 ft × 10.3 ft); this was converted into a baptistry. In its original state, it was a service room. It was first divided in the direction of the height by installing a ceiling at 3.45 m (11.3 ft) off the ground. The western part was dug up to the bedrock for the installation of a basin against the western wall. The basin was 1.63 m (5.3 ft) wide and 0.95 m (3.1 ft) deep, including 0.5 m (1.6 ft) above the ground level of the room. It was topped with brick-and-mortar masonry ciborium consisting of a barrel vault 174 m (571 ft) wide, which was supported by two pilasters along the west wall and two masonry columns on the east side. A 0.2 m (0.66 ft) step was built in front of basin. The whole constitutes the baptismal pool of a building of worship. On the other side of the room, a low bench 0.22 m × 0.5 m (0.72 ft × 1.64 ft) was built along the wall. A semicircular niche is dug in the south wall between the two doors, and a table was set up in front of it. All of the room's the walls received a rich, painted decoration; geometric and plant motifs were painted on the baptismal pool; the room's ceiling and the vault were decorated with white stars on a blue background, according to a pattern quite similar to that of the vault of the mithraeum of Dura Europos. The decoration of the ciborium also recalls that of the Torah niche in the synagogue; the same artists were probably responsible for both.

No prominent altar was found and archeologists are unsure where exactly it was located, it was suggested a platform in the big room could have held an altar. In contrast with the others, the room serving as the baptistry was very developed. The layout of the building's assembly room seems to suggest the emergence of the ritual Christian Mass at this time, with a raised dais on one end elevating the speaker and making them visible and audible to a large assembly, and the orientation of the room towards the east as opposed to the western Jerusalem, which was already at this moment in history a documented Christian custom. This room's numerous wall paintings were relatively well preserved and were made in the tradition of Parthian art, although their quality is significantly lower than that of the Dura-Europos synagogue.

The building is notably smaller and sports less modifications than the nearby synagogue that was excavated during the same time period, which can generally be attributed to the Christian population in Dura-Europos being much smaller and less affluent than the Jewish population at the time of its construction. Another reason for this may have been restrictions placed on the practice of Christianity by the Roman Empire who had control over Dura-Europos at the time of its construction; the church was small so the believers could met in secret while the building looked the same as other houses of the block.

=== Discovery ===
The house-church was uncovered during an archaeological project that was first initiated at the end of World War I, and after stalling in 1923 due to civil unrest and revolts against French control in Syria, was reinvigorated in 1928 with the involvement of American researchers led by scientific director Michael Rostovtzeff of Yale University. Clark Hopkins, who was field director of the site from 1931 to 1935, oversaw the discovery of the house-church in 1931 working closely with Harry Pearson, who was able to construct a detailed floor plan of the church. The discovery was significant at the time due to it being the only ritual Christian building dated from before the Constantinian era. It also offered a unique glimpse into the layout and architecture of such early converted Christian buildings before they were transformed into larger churches, since many such house-churches are known to have existed but were either destroyed or never uncovered.

=== Religious significance ===
The finding of the church gives an important window into the early spread of Christianity throughout Syria, and lends truth to apostolic legends which claim that Jesus' first generation of followers originated Christianity in Syrian cities. There is ongoing scholarly debate about the greater significance of Christian presence in Dura-Europos specifically, and the reason for the church's construction. Some scholars have attempted to draw a connecting line between the existence of the church and the Jewish synagogue excavated nearby, claiming the church may have branched off from the synagogue or emerged as a counter to it, evidenced by a piece of Hebrew writing found within the church which "resembles not only a Jewish prayer, but also a mealtime blessing passed down in the Didache, an early Jewish-Christian liturgical manual likely from Syria." Others have associated the tradition of Christianity in Dura-Europos with the spread of Valentinianism; a school of thought originated by the mid-second century Christian theologian Valentinus whose ideas were preserved in texts and circulated throughout the eastern world. Due to the similarity in traditions documented in Dura-Europos specifically and by Valentinian teachings, some scholars believe Valentinian presence and influence in Dura-Europos is what led to the construction of the church. Another theory is that Christianity arrived in Dura-Europos with the Roman army who made up "as much as 50 percent" of the city's population during the time in which they occupied it. The church was excavated near the city wall, which was the frontier of the city's expansion during the time in which they were under Roman control. Considering many nearby houses were known to be occupied by members of the army, and graffiti was found inside the church containing Latin-originated names, Roman involvement in the church is more or less confirmed, though how much their presence directly led to its formation is still debated.

== Paintings ==
The surviving frescoes are acknowledged to be "the earliest church wall painting[s] yet discovered," and probably the oldest-known Christian paintings. The "Good Shepherd", the "Healing of the paralytic" and "Christ and Peter walking on the water" are considered the earliest depictions of Jesus. A much larger fresco depicts three women approaching a large sarcophagus; this most likely depicts the three Marys visiting Christ's tomb or the Parable of the Ten Virgins. There were also frescoes of Adam and Eve, and David and Goliath. The frescoes clearly followed the Hellenistic Jewish iconographic tradition but they are more crudely done than the paintings of the nearby Dura-Europos synagogue.

According to The Oxford History of Christian Worship, early Christian paintings would be quite surprising for a modern viewer:

Clearly, however, the early images have an agenda other than the simple illustration of texts. Both at Dura-Europos and in the catacombs, the visual jottings of seemingly disconnected scenes serve to answer the question: Who is our God? And, by visual analogies, they express the triumph over death, of which baptism is the beginning. Blessed be the faithful God who saved the Israelites through the waters of the sea, who saved Jonah from the belly of the whale, who saved Daniel and the three youths, who provided water in the desert! Blessed be the God who, like a shepherd, finds and rescues the lost, who heals the sick and feeds the hungry! Blessed be the God who raised Lazarus from the dead, and who lifts to eternal life all that go down into the tomb of baptism! Blessed be God who will do for us the great deeds he wrought for our ancestors!

=== Baptistry ===
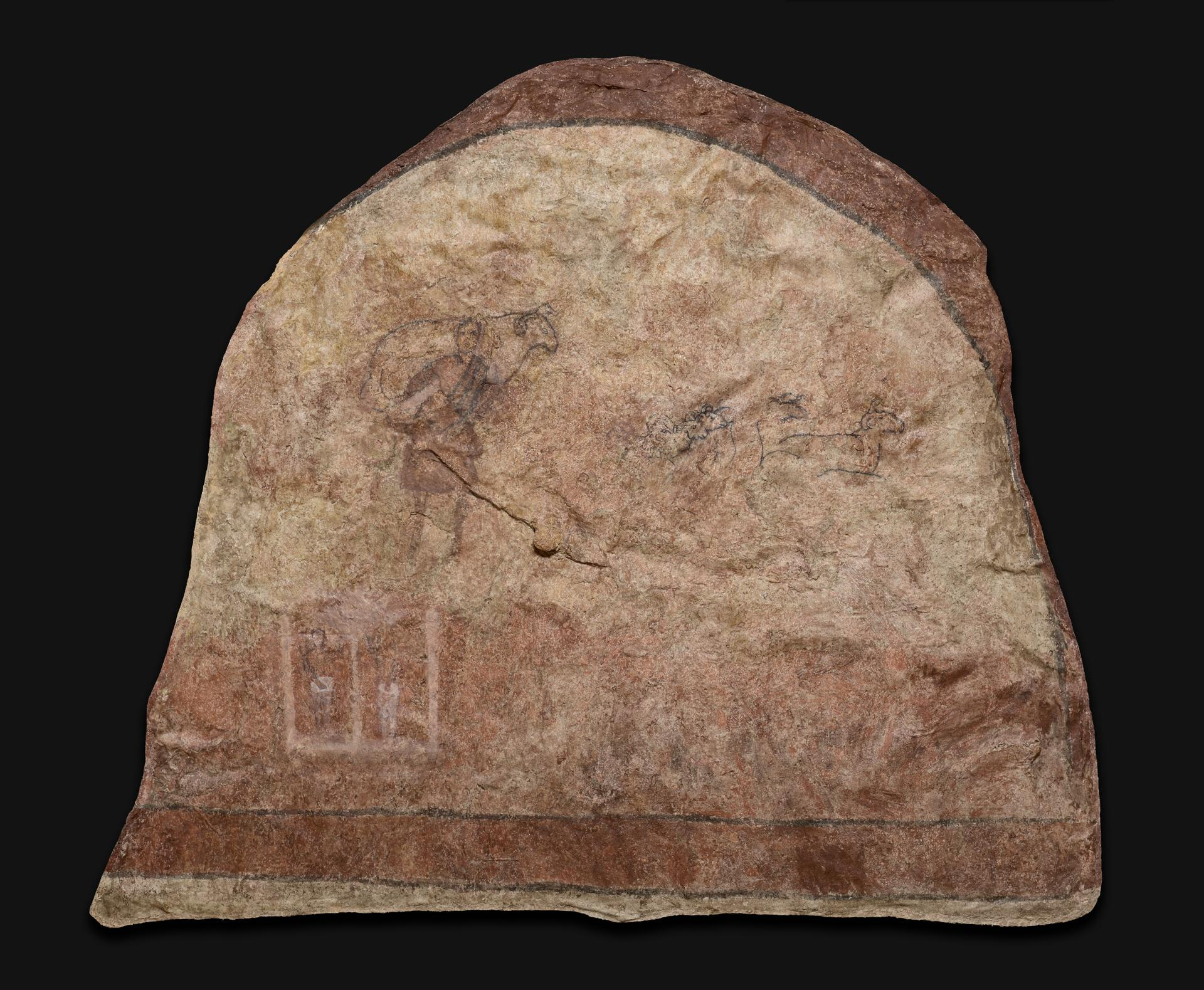
The Good Shepherd, Adam and Eve

Only the baptistry was decorated with wall paintings, which distinguished the church from the nearby Jewish synagogue that featured artwork on display throughout. Scholars hypothesize that this difference stems from Christianity's desire to promote conversion at the time, which would only happen within the baptistry and give the convert the singular experience of witnessing the artworks when they were anointed. The room's ceiling could be reconstructed using plaster fragments; it was painted in dark blue with bright stars. The baptismal font was on the west side of the room, where there were a brick canopy with a vaulted ceiling and two pillars in the front. The pillars were painted dark green with black veins, probably to imitate marble. The front over the arch of the niche showed fruits in fields. The ceiling inside the niche was blue with bright stars. Inside the niche was the baptismal pool. There are paintings on the back wall; the Good Shepherd was on the left with a ram on his shoulders. The figure was about 40 cm (16 in) high. A flock of sheep was depicted in front of him, in the middle of the field and on the right. The number of sheep and rams cannot be determined today; it was probably once between thirteen and sixteen. The sheep on the far right are drinking water, although this part of the scene was in poor condition. The large number of sheep was atypical for comparable presentations. Under the Shepherd are Adam and Eve; both figures appearing to be a later addition. The whole picture was found to be poorly preserved and was found in fragments that had to be reassembled. It is uncertain whether the number of sheep had a symbolic meaning. The representation of the Good Shepherd was extremely popular in ancient times; it is always a picture of a young, beardless man in a short skirt carrying a sheep on his back.

=== Procession of women ===
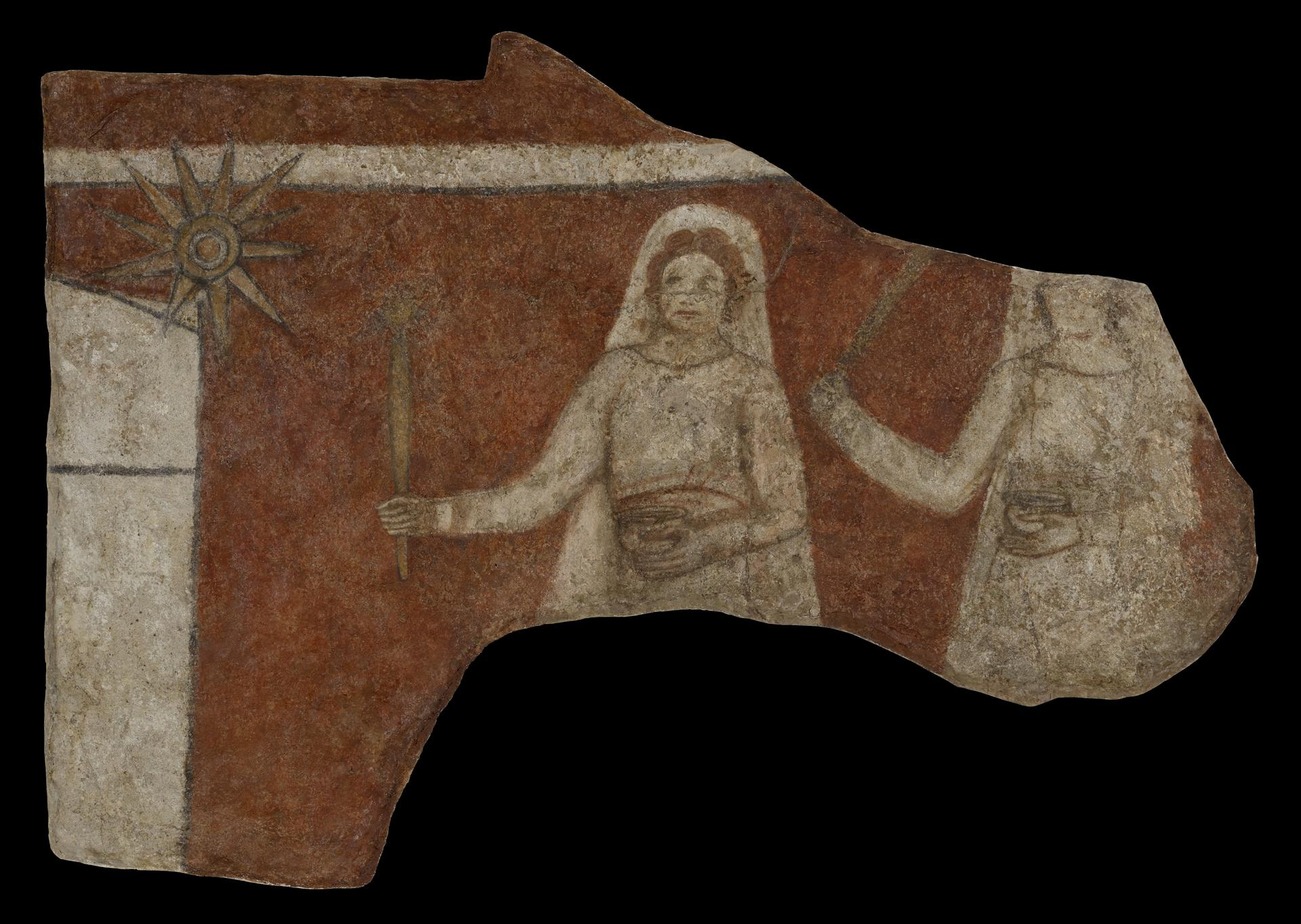
Procession of women

The main part of the east and north wall is taken up in the lower half by a single scene, which is only partially preserved. When the paintings were found on the east wall, the feet of five women walking to the left could still be seen. The scene continues on the north wall, where the remains of a painted, half-closed door are located, which was exactly opposite the room's main door and was the first to be seen when entering the room. The following part of the depiction, to the left of the door, has been completely destroyed but the depiction of two women is well preserved. The women hold torches in one hand and a vessel in the other. They are dressed in white veils and stand in front of a white, box-shaped object, believed in some interpretations to be Jesus' tomb.

Other investigations concluded the Parable of the Wise and Foolish Virgins is presented here, whose story is transmitted in the Gospel according to Matthew 24:1–13. Ten virgins go to their bridegroom, carrying lamps. Five of the women take enough oil. In the middle of the night, the bridegroom arrives and the virgins set up their lamps, the foolish virgins ask the others for more oil because the lights threatened to go out. The wise virgins say they should buy oil, they then go into the wedding hall, the door of which is closed behind them so virgins arriving later could not enter. The white object represents a wedding hall or a wedding tent. The door to the wedding hall is on the far right on the wall, while the five foolish virgins were in front of the door on the east wall. Baptism was viewed in the Eastern Church as a kind of marriage between the baptized and Jesus, which explains the importance of the scenes. In the Eastern Church, the ten virgins were the brides of Jesus. The scene told initiates they were beginning a new spiritual relationship with God.

=== Miracles of Jesus ===
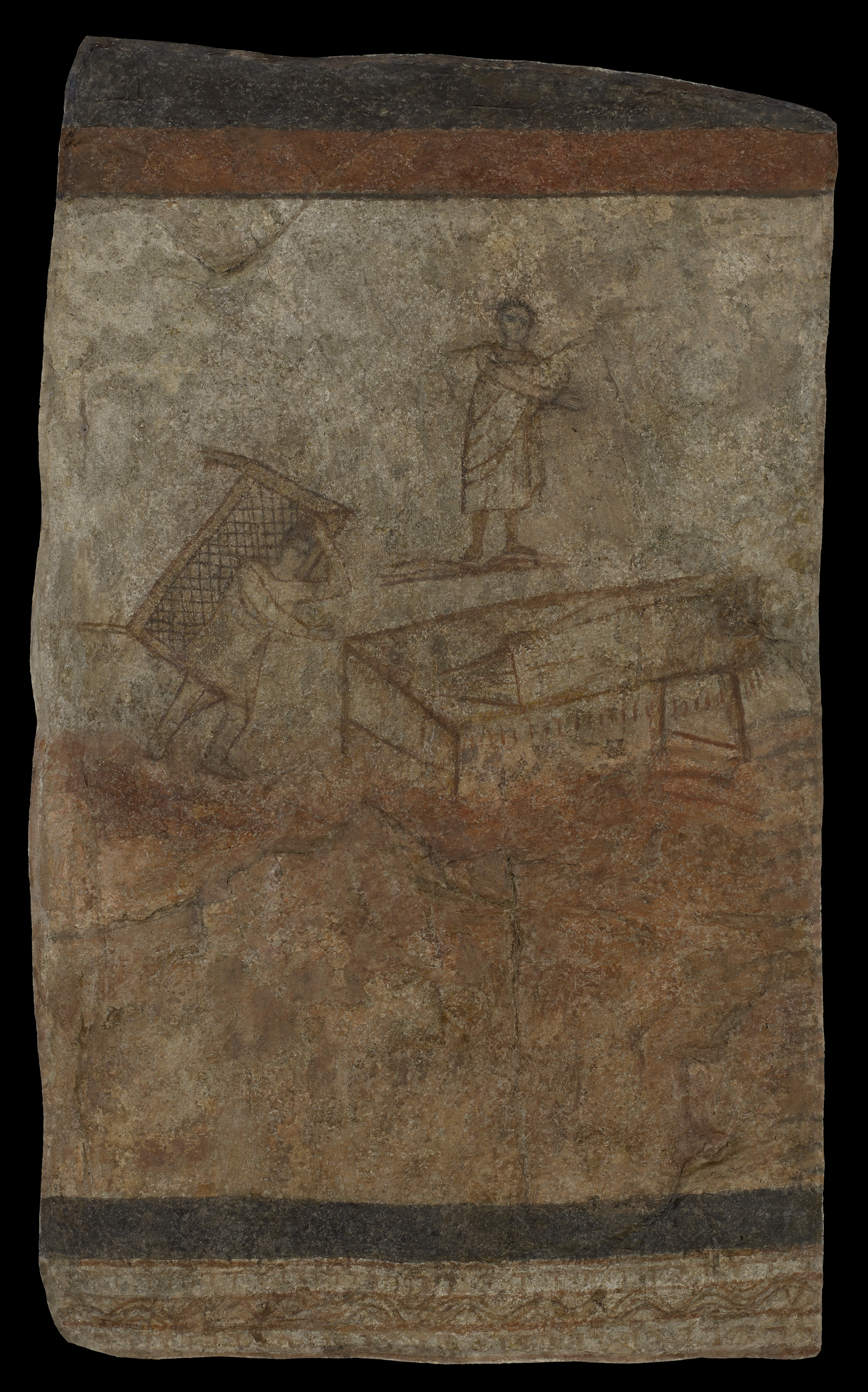
Healing of the paralytic

Above the main field of the wall with the depictions of women were several smaller scenes, only two of which had survived. The preserved scenes were about 90 cm (35 in) high and 1.9 m (6 ft 3 in) wide in the lower part. In the lower third, there was a representation of water; it is possible this was an element connecting of all the scenes. Miracles performed by Jesus were depicted here. On the north wall, there were three figures. Standing in the middle and above the others was a man, probably Jesus. Below Jesus, on the right side was a man lying on a bed. On the left was a depiction of a man walking away carrying a bed on his shoulders, which researchers agreed was a depiction of the story of the healing of a paralyzed man told in Mark 2:1–12, although there are other opinions on the interpretation of the scene.

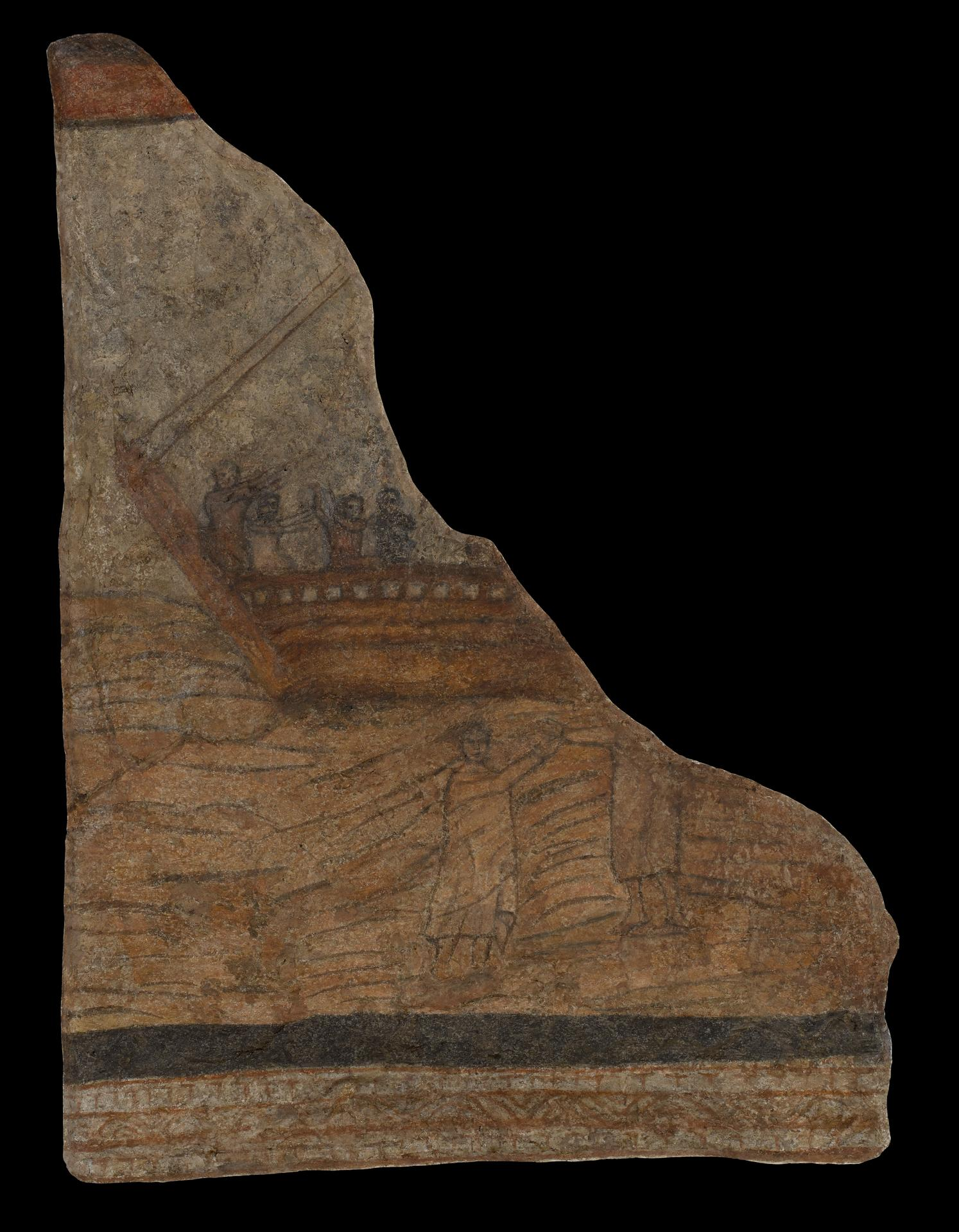
Wall painting from the Baptistery: Christ and Peter walking on the water

To the right of it, another scene shows two men walking on water, not a depiction of the story in which Jesus walks on water (a solo walk), which is told in Mark 6:45–61 and in Matthew 14:22–34. The scene was only partially preserved because the wall was torn down. In the background, there is a large ship with the apostles on board, who watch the two men. Five figures had been preserved:

Christ encourages his apostle Peter to walk over a stormy sea as a ship carrying other apostles sails in the background. The image told viewers that, just as Christ saved Peter from drowning in the waters of Galilee, he would save baptized Christian souls through his death and resurrection.

=== Woman at the fountain and garden ===
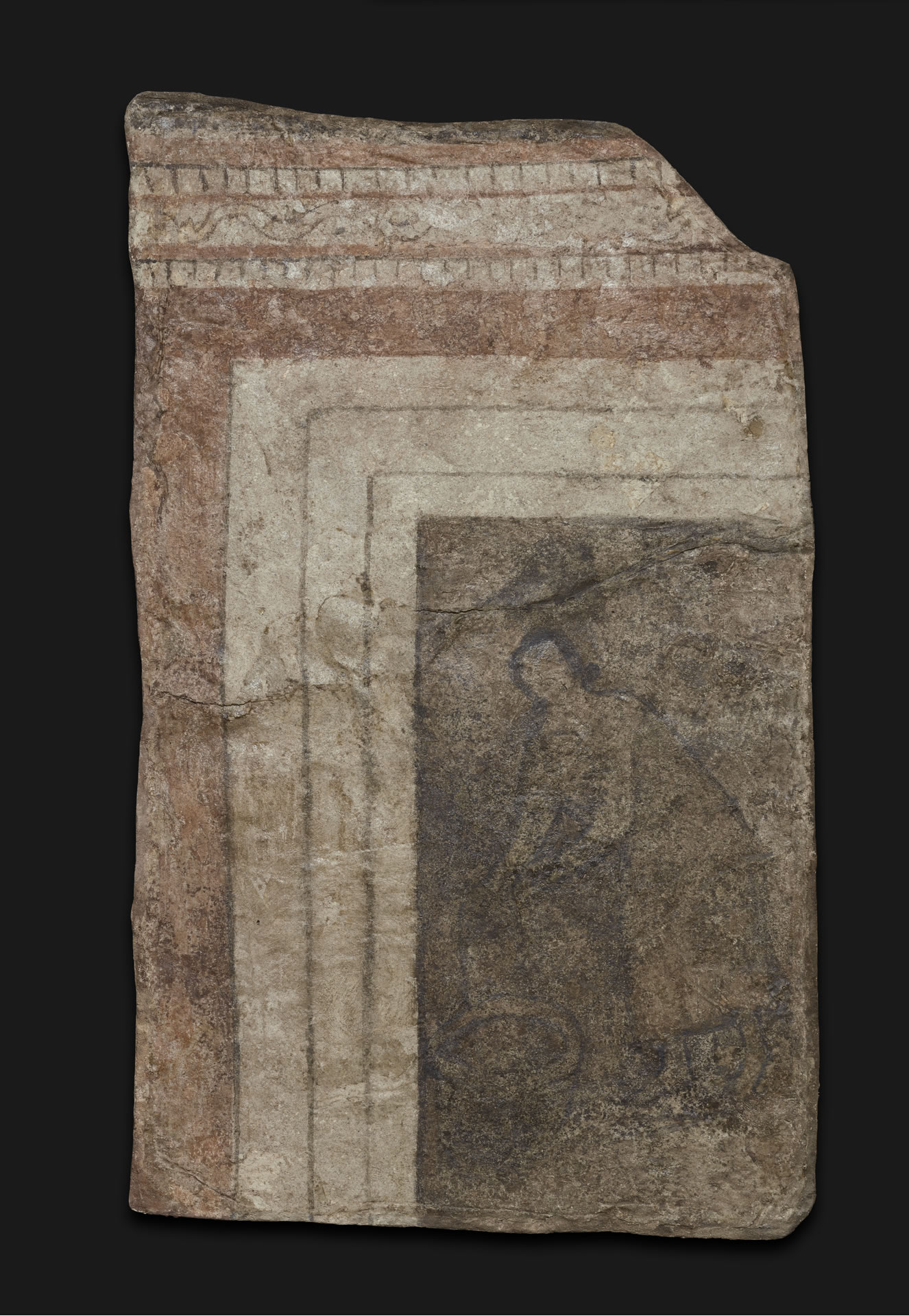
The Samaritan woman at the well, or possibly Saint Mary

The south wall had two doors and a niche, limiting the space available for paintings. Near the main niche, there was a figure of a woman standing by a fountain. She turns to the left and wears a long robe with a rosette on her chest. In front of her is a well, into which she lowers two ropes. Two lines can be seen on their backs that come from heaven. In older literature, the woman was interpreted as the Samaritan woman at the well and sometimes also as Rebekah. Recent considerations, however, make it more likely the painting depicts Virgin Mary. If the identification as the Virgin Mary is correct, it is the oldest image of Mary known to date.

Above the woman, on the upper part of the wall next to the canopy, was a painting of a garden. This scene remains only in descriptions and a technically poor photograph.

=== David and Goliath ===
On the south wall under a niche between the two doors was a depiction of David and Goliath, to which as the inscriptions on the figures clearly attest. This depiction was in a poor condition. Above the scene was a Greek inscription: "τὸν Χ(ριστὸ)ν Ἰ(ησοῦ)ν ὑμεῖν. Μν[ή]σκεσθε [...Πρ]όκλου" ("Christ Jesus (be) with you, remember [Pr]oklos"). It is unclear whether the inscription is connected to a foundation on the part of the mentioned Proclus or whether it was affixed in his memory after his death. David stands on the right and hits Goliath. In the image, David was depicted as a Roman soldier and Goliath wore the costume of a Persian, who were the Romans' contemporaneous enemies. The depiction of David in a baptistry is unusual but to the Eastern Church, David was the prototype of an anointed man, having been anointed in the Bible by Samuel prior to his battle with Goliath, ensuring his victory. Anointings also took place in the baptistry, whereby baptism was also viewed as a kind of anointing.

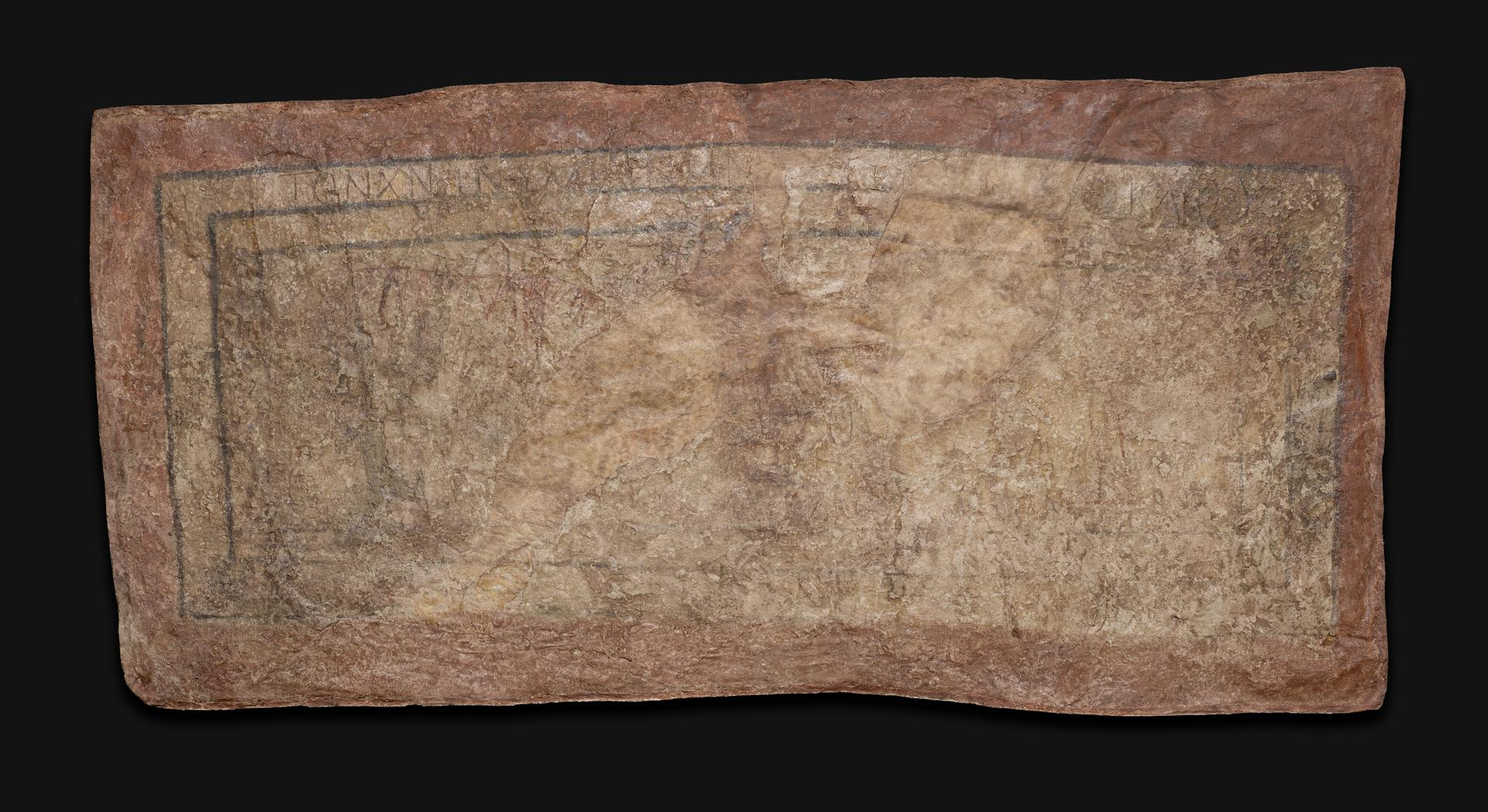
Baptistry wall painting: David and Goliath (with inscription)

== Graffiti ==
Graffiti and drawings were found on the walls of the house. A Greek inscription on the west wall of the assembly hall is important for the history of the building. It names the year 545 of the Seleucid era, which corresponds to the year 232/233 AD. Several examples of the Greek alphabet were present, as was one instance of the Syriac alphabet. Four names were also identified, two of which, Paulus and Proclus, come from Latin and are linked to members of the Roman garrison who occupied the city, lending to the theory that the Roman army had an influence on the origin of Christianity in Dura-Europos. Also noteworthy are two line drawings, each depicting a rider.

== Comparable buildings ==
The ruins of the oldest house church made of stone blocks, which were built at the beginning of the fourth century AD through the conversion of a residential building, are located in Qirqbize in northwest Syria. In the nearby village of Fafertin stood the oldest purpose-built church building, which is inscribed and dated to 372 AD.

== Sources ==
- Brody, Lisa R.; Hoffman, Gail L. (2011). Dura-Europos : crossroads of antiquity. Chestnut Hill, Mass.; Chicago, Ill. : McMullen Museum of Art, Boston College : dist. by the University of Chicago Press. ISBN 978-1-892850-16-4.
- Fine, Steven (December 2011). "Dura Europos: Crossroads of Antiquity and Edge of Empires: Pagans, Jews and Christians at Roman Dura-Europos". Near Eastern Archaeology. 74 (4): 246–249. doi:10.5615/neareastarch.74.4.0246. S2CID 163349096.
- Fischer, James A. (1955). "The Synagogue Paintings of Dura-Europos". The Catholic Biblical Quarterly. 17 (2): 69–75. ISSN 0008-7912. JSTOR 43710126.
- Gates, Marie-Henriette (September 1984). "Dura-Europos: A Fortress of Syro-Mesopotamian Art". The Biblical Archaeologist. 47 (3): 166–181. doi:10.2307/3209918. JSTOR 3209918. S2CID 195010349.
- Hopkins, Clark (1934). "The Christian Church". The Excavations At Dura Europos. pp. 238–288.
- Kraeling, Carl Hermann; Welles, Charles Bradford (1967). The excavations at Dura-Europos: conducted by Yale University and the French Academy of Letters, Final Report 8 Part 2, The Christian building. New York: New Haven: Dura-Europos Publications, Locust Valley. OCLC 490392414.
- Peppard, Michael (2016). The world's oldest church : Bible, art, and ritual at Dura-Europos, Syria. New Haven. ISBN 978-0-300-21399-7.
- Snyder, Graydon F. (2003). Ante pacem : archaeological evidence of church life before Constantine (Rev. ed.). Macon, Ga.: Mercer University Press. ISBN 978-0-86554-895-4.
- Snyder, Graydon F. (2005). The people are holy : the history and theology of Free Church worship (1st ed.). Macon, Ga.: Mercer University Press. ISBN 978-0-86554-952-4.
- Wainwright, Geoffrey (2006). The Oxford History of Christian Worship. Oxford University Press. ISBN 978-0-19-513886-3.
- White, L. Michael (1997). The social origins of Christian architecture. Valley Forge, Pa.: Trinity Press. ISBN 978-1-56338-180-5.
