= Serjilla =

Archaeological site in Syria

- سيرجيلة (Arabic)
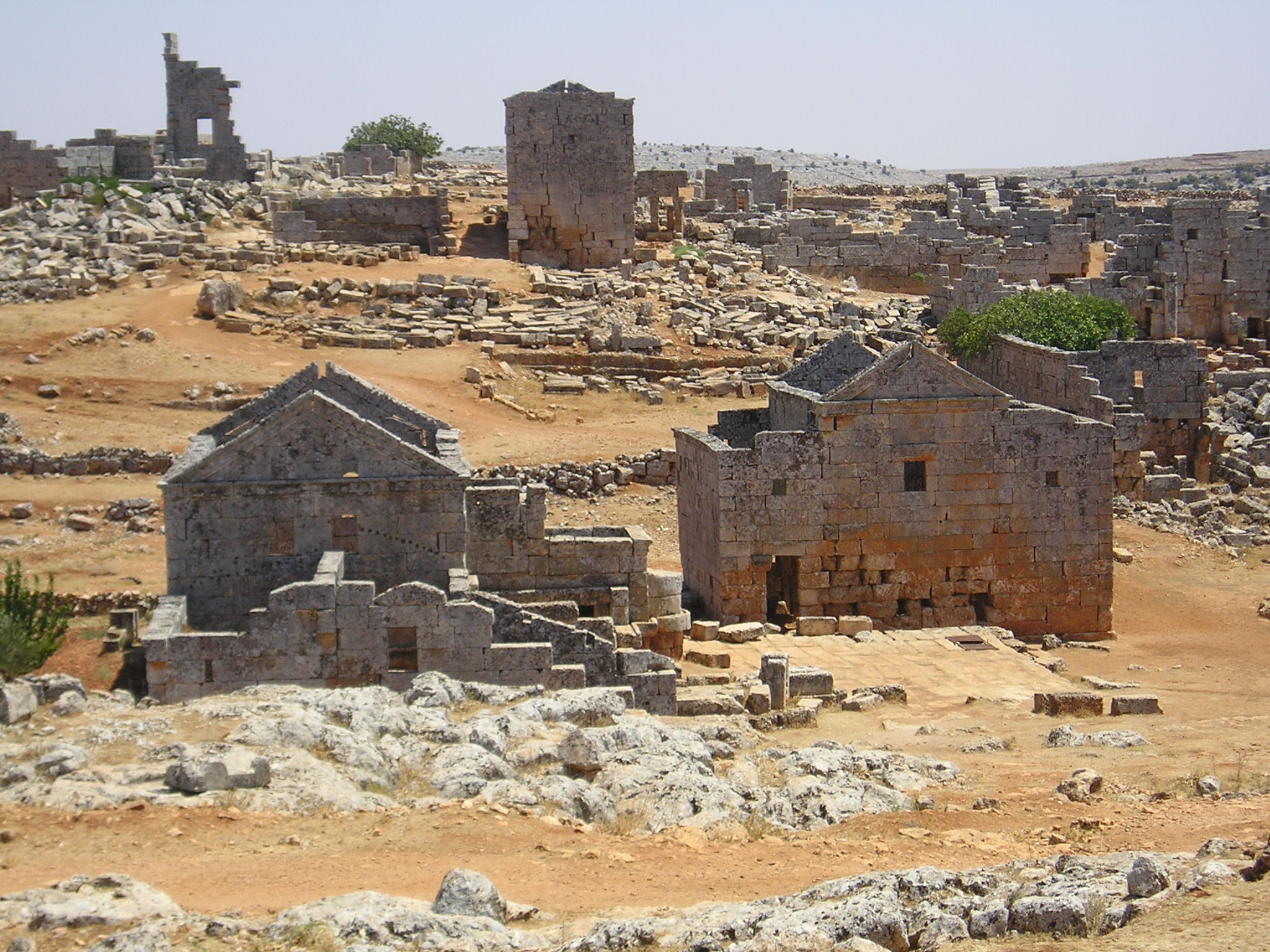
- Ruins of Serjilla

- Location within Syria
- 35.670°N 36.569°E
- Type: settlement
- Cultures: Byzantine
- Location: Idlib Governorate, Syria
- Part of: Dead Cities

History
- Built: ca. 473 AD
- Abandoned: Seventh century AD

Site notes
- Excavation dates: 1899—present
- Condition: ruined
- Owner: Public
- Public access: Yes

Serjilla (Arabic: سرجيلا) is one of the best preserved of the Dead Cities in northwestern Syria, containing about 700 sites. It is located in the Jebel Riha, approximately 65 km north from Hama and 80 km southwest from Aleppo, very close to ruins of another "Dead City", Bara.

The settlement arose in a natural basin and prospered from cultivating of grapes and olives. The presence of a bath complex indicates the wealth of the community. Serjilla, a Byzantine settlement, was built in 473. Thomas Joseph Shanan considered Serjilla as "Pompeii of the East".

== History ==
Charles-Jean-Melchior de Vogüé, a French archaeologist, did the first scientific studies in 1860s. In 1899, an archaeological team from Princeton University discovered a large mosaic on the main hall floor, but it had disappeared when the team returned six years later. Traces of now destroyed murals were found on the walls as well. Next to the baths stands an andron, a meeting place for men. Further east, there was a small church but not much remains of it. Among ruins of numerous residential houses, a two storey villa which still stands today. In two lower rooms, one can still see an arch which supported the ceiling. This feature was typical in the Dead Cities. Behind the villa, there is a sunken building with an olive press. In Serjilla, limestone-mining was a very common and mature industry. Even the empty space left by mining activities were useful. Sometimes mining took place right under the buildings.

Like most other of the Dead Cities, Serjilla was abandoned in the seventh century when the Arabs conquered the region and discontinued merchant routes between Antioch and Apamea.

In 2011, because of the Syrian civil war, UNESCO put Serjilla on the list World Heritage in Danger.

=== Damage caused by the Syrian civil war ===
From 2012-2015 the site was used as a camp by refugees, who lived in the ruins. They caused minor damage to the site and also modified the site for their needs by building ovens to bake bread and a toilet was built.

In the western part of the site, a military platoon used the ruins as residence and modified the site to their needs, such as adding a roof of tin plates.

In May of 2019 the western part of the site was hit by 3 Russian vacuum missiles, which led to damaging of the site, including a house which was rehabilitated into a tourist guest house in 2011, losing its roof.

== Gallery ==
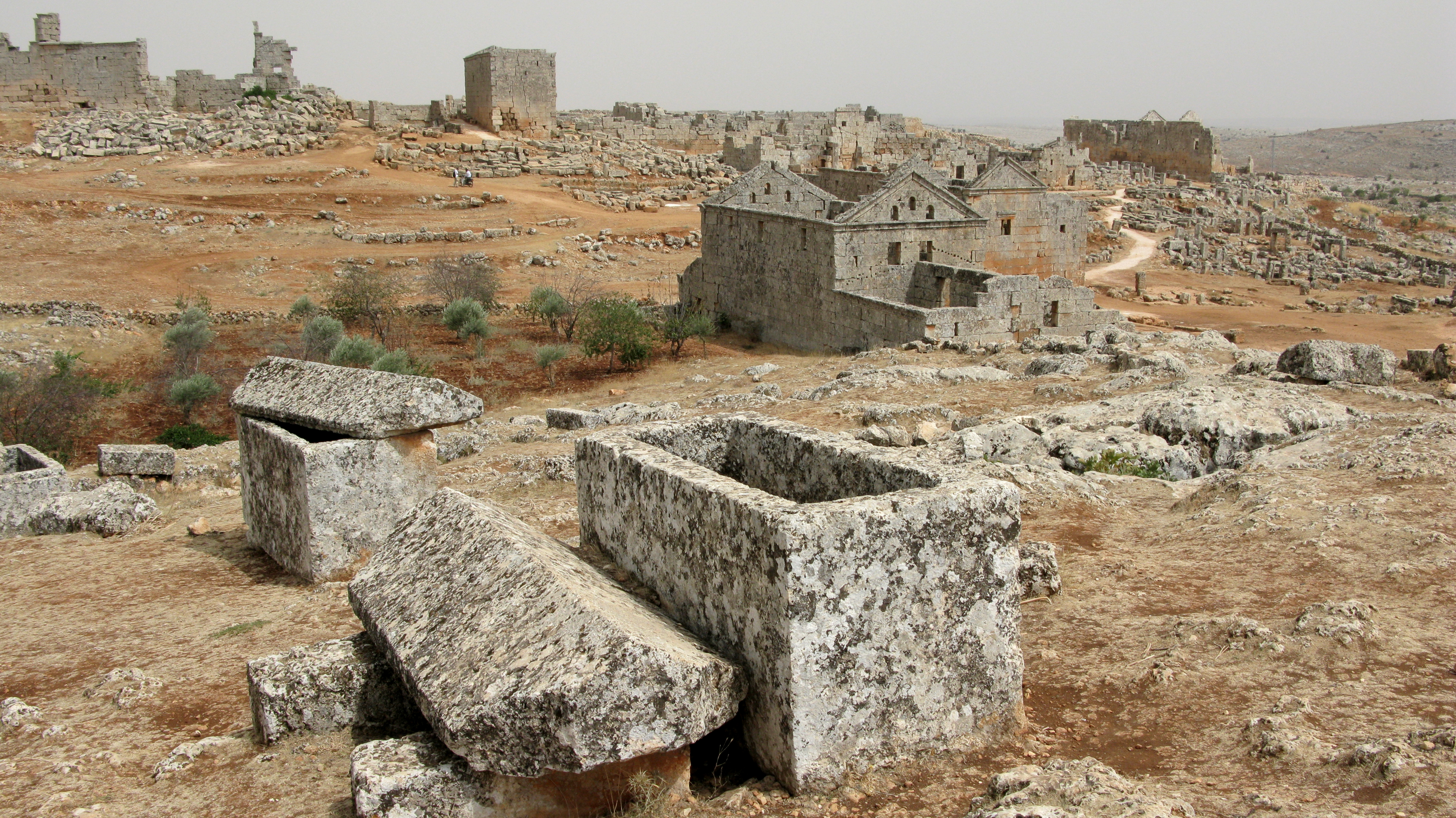
Sarcophaguses

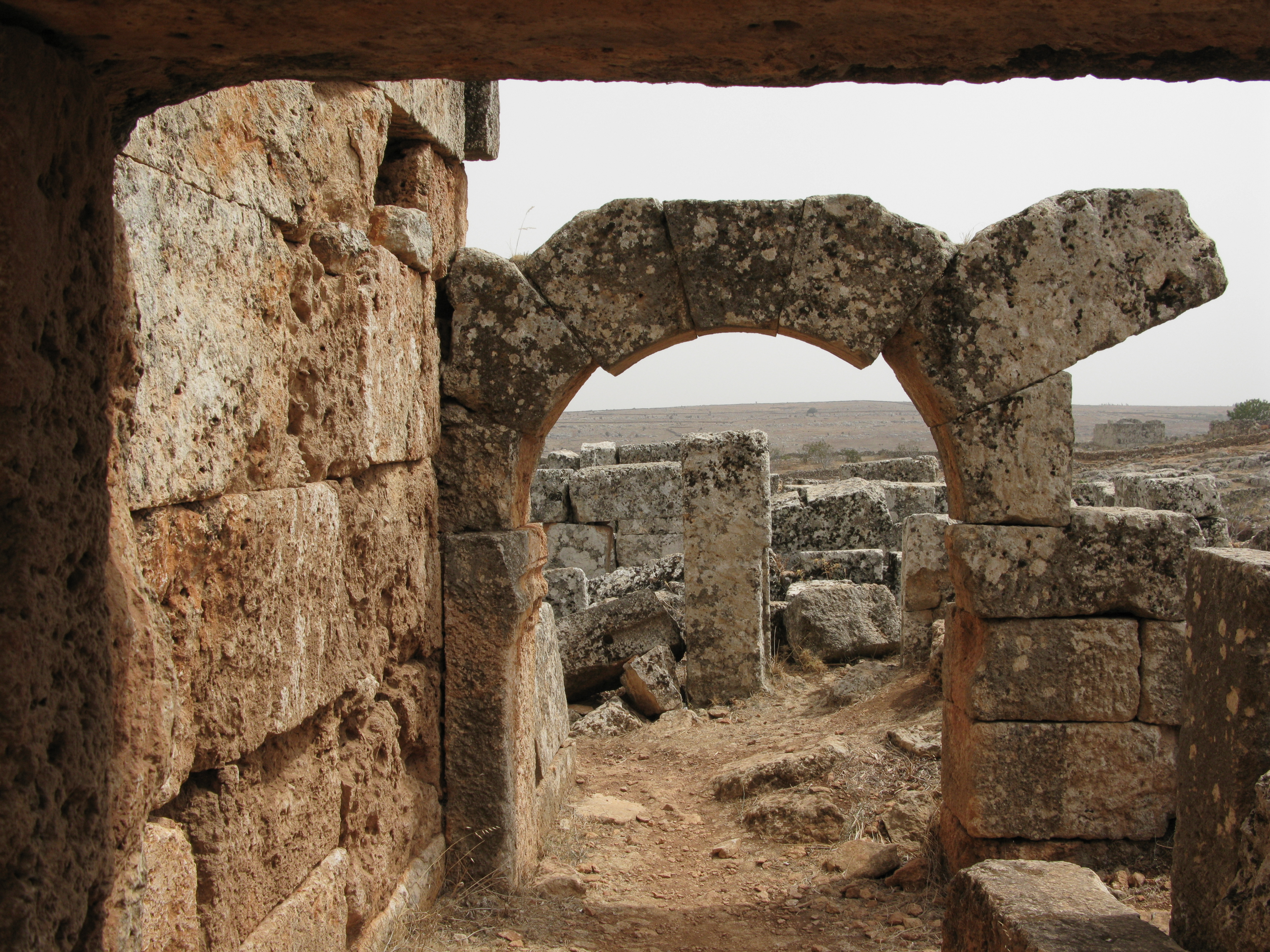
Arch of the church

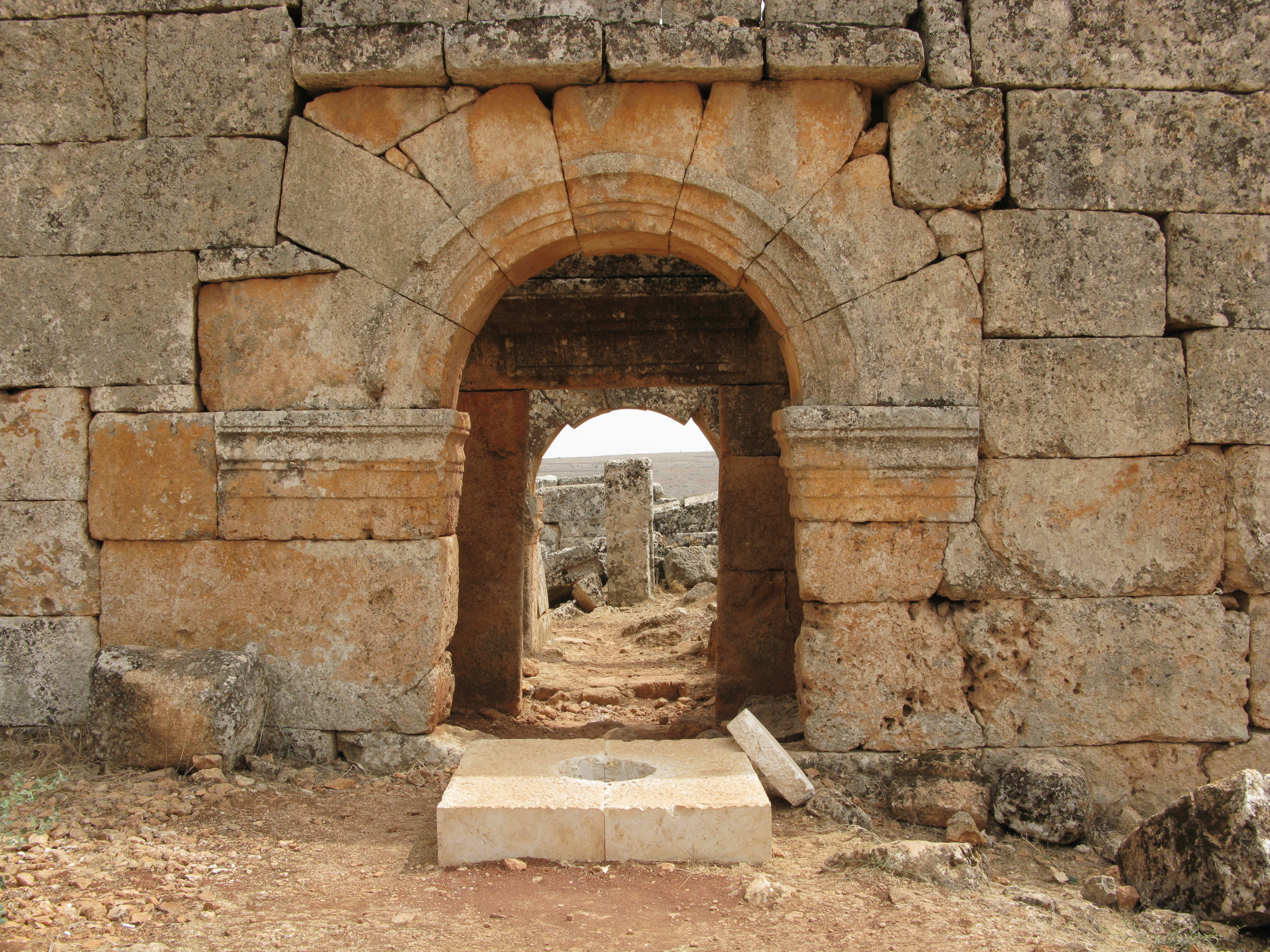
Walls and gate

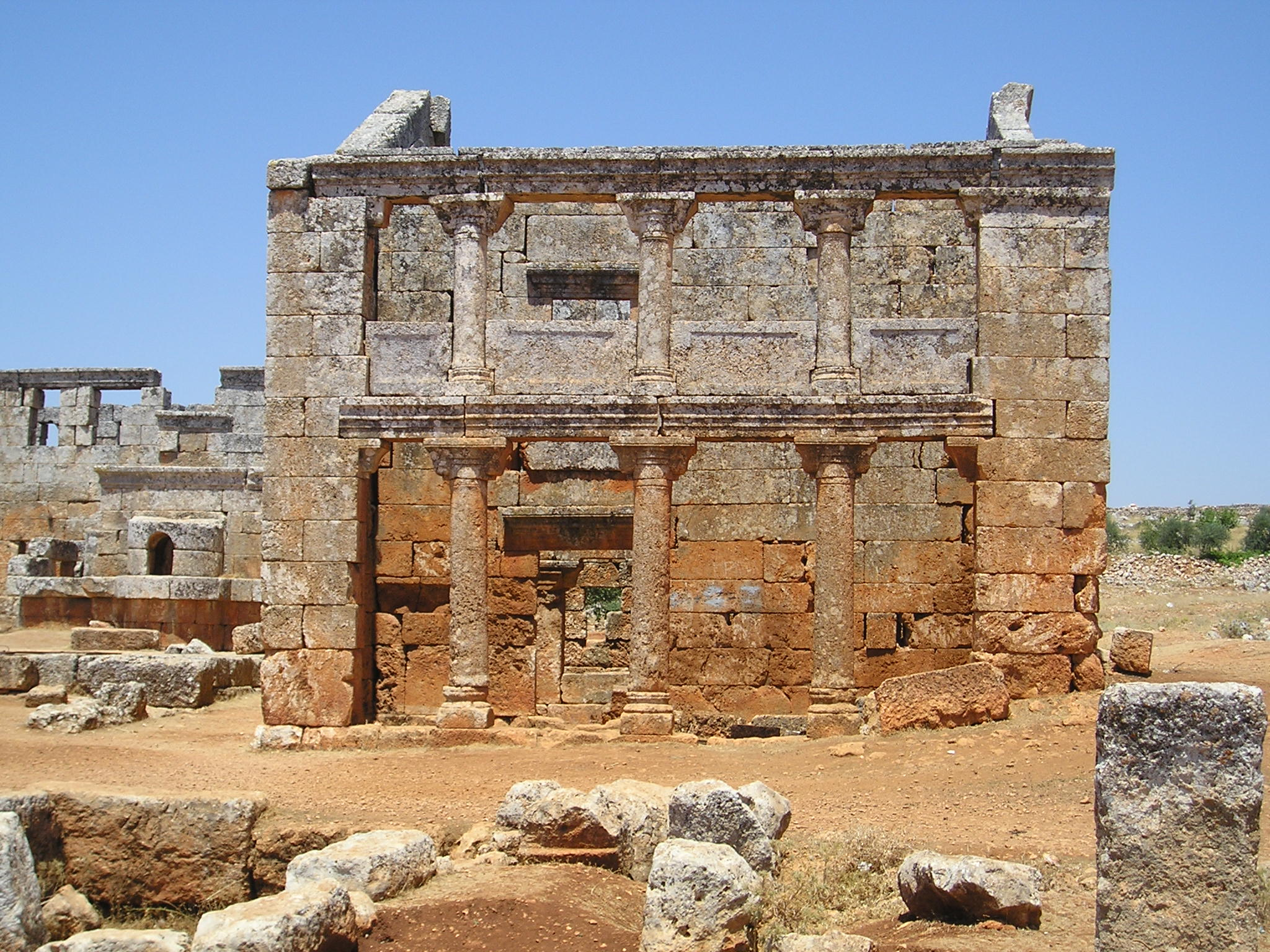
Two storey villa

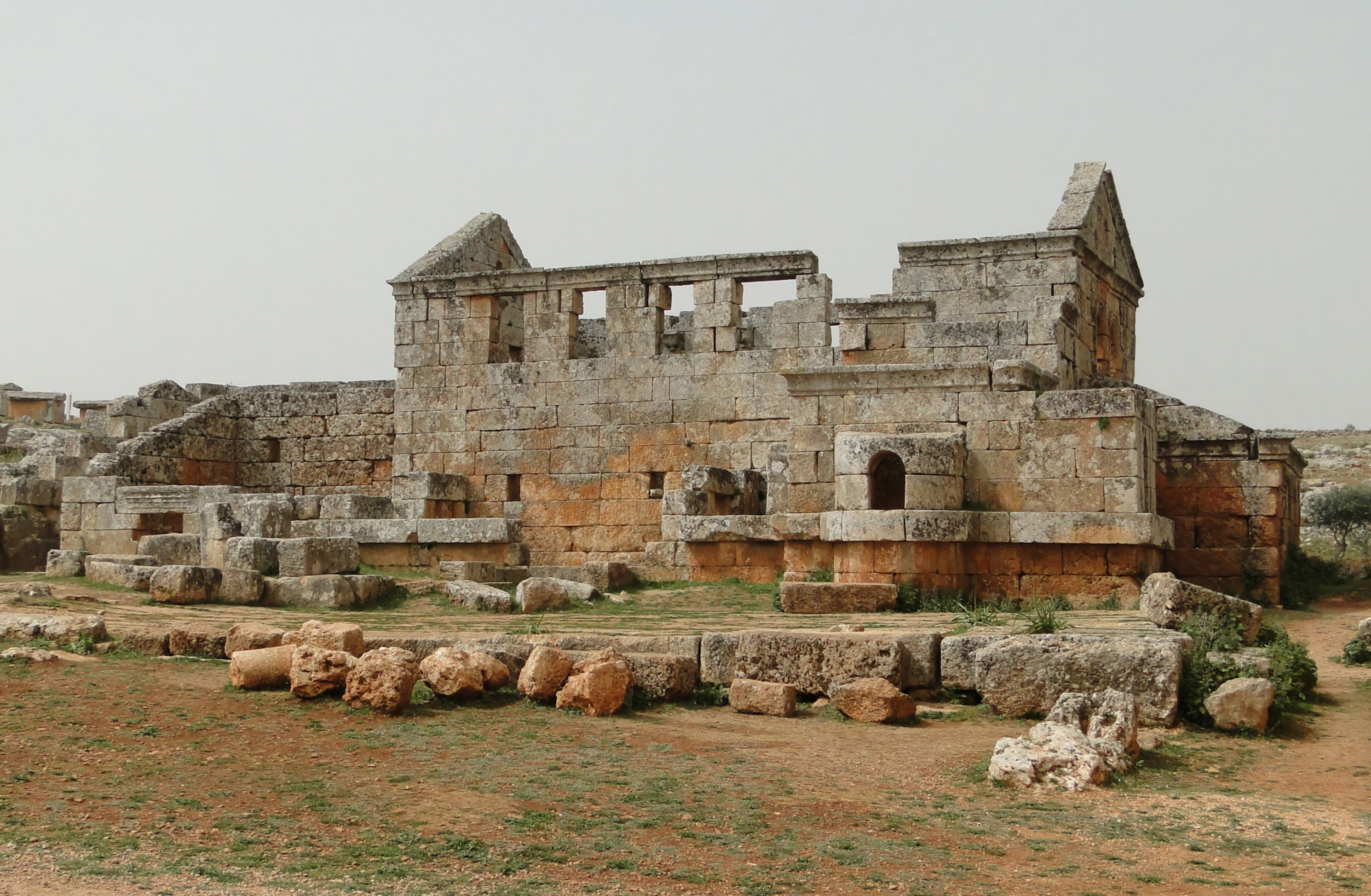
Public baths

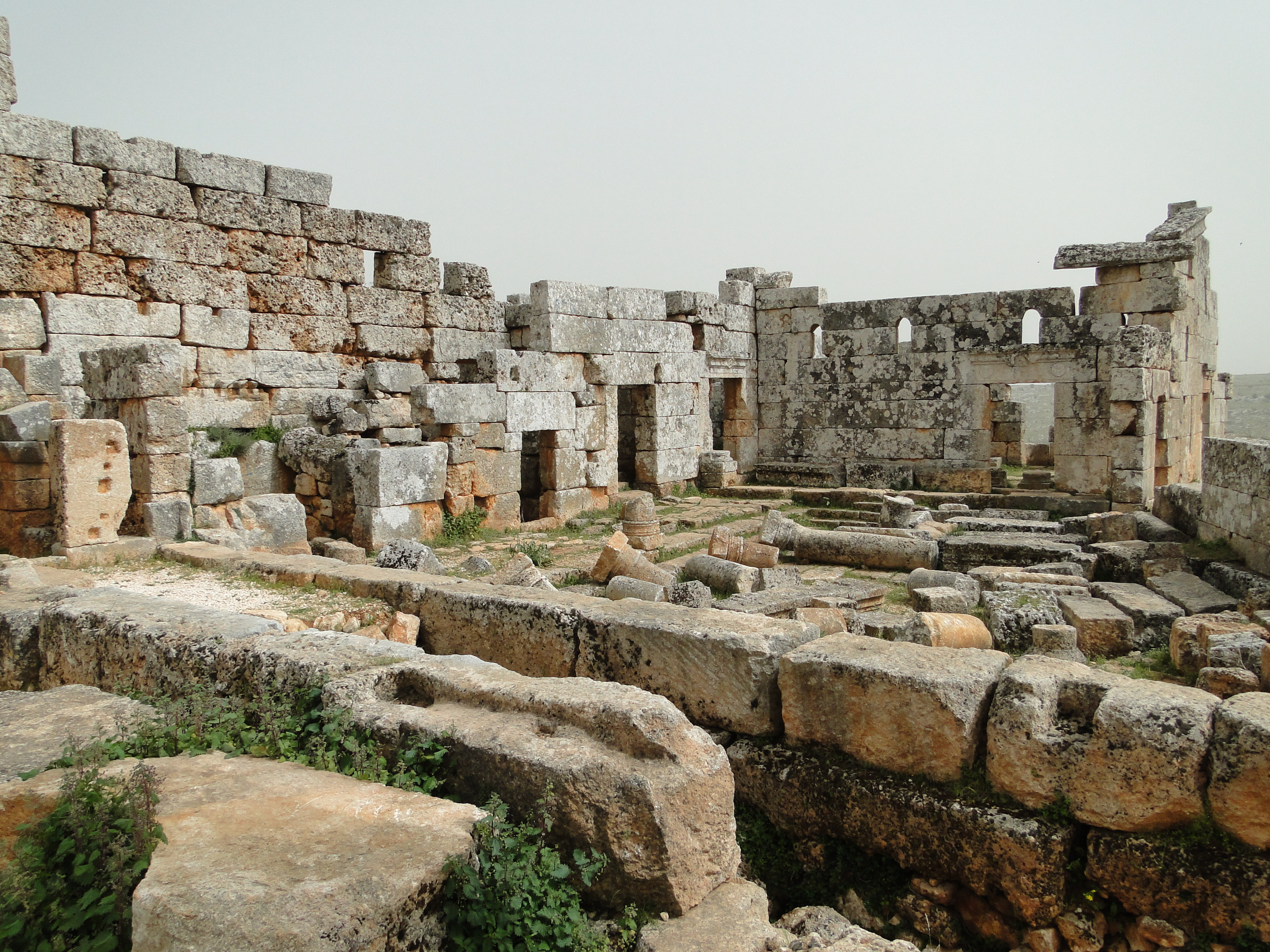
The church

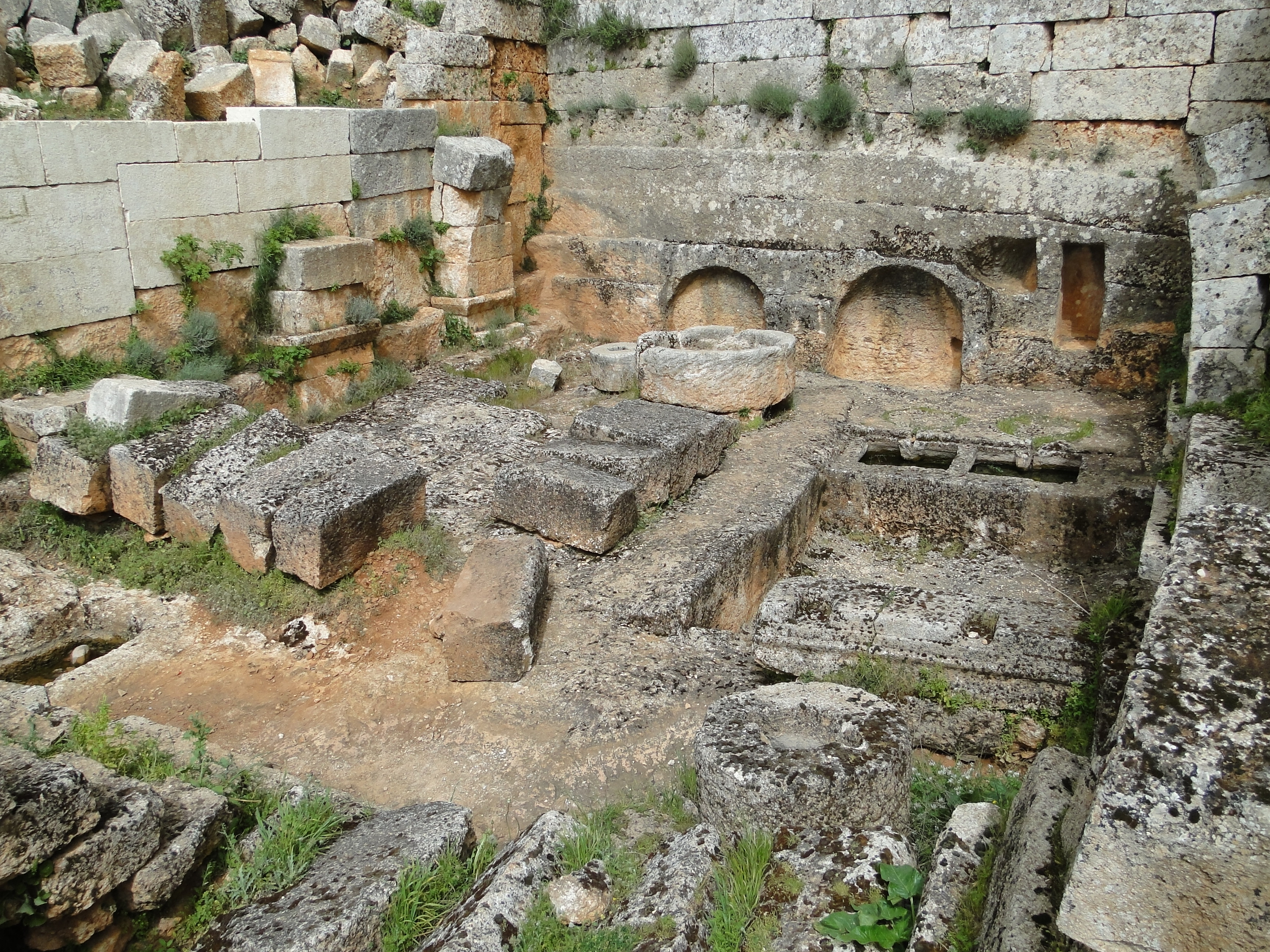
The press-house
