= Qirqbize =

- قرقبيزه (Arabic)
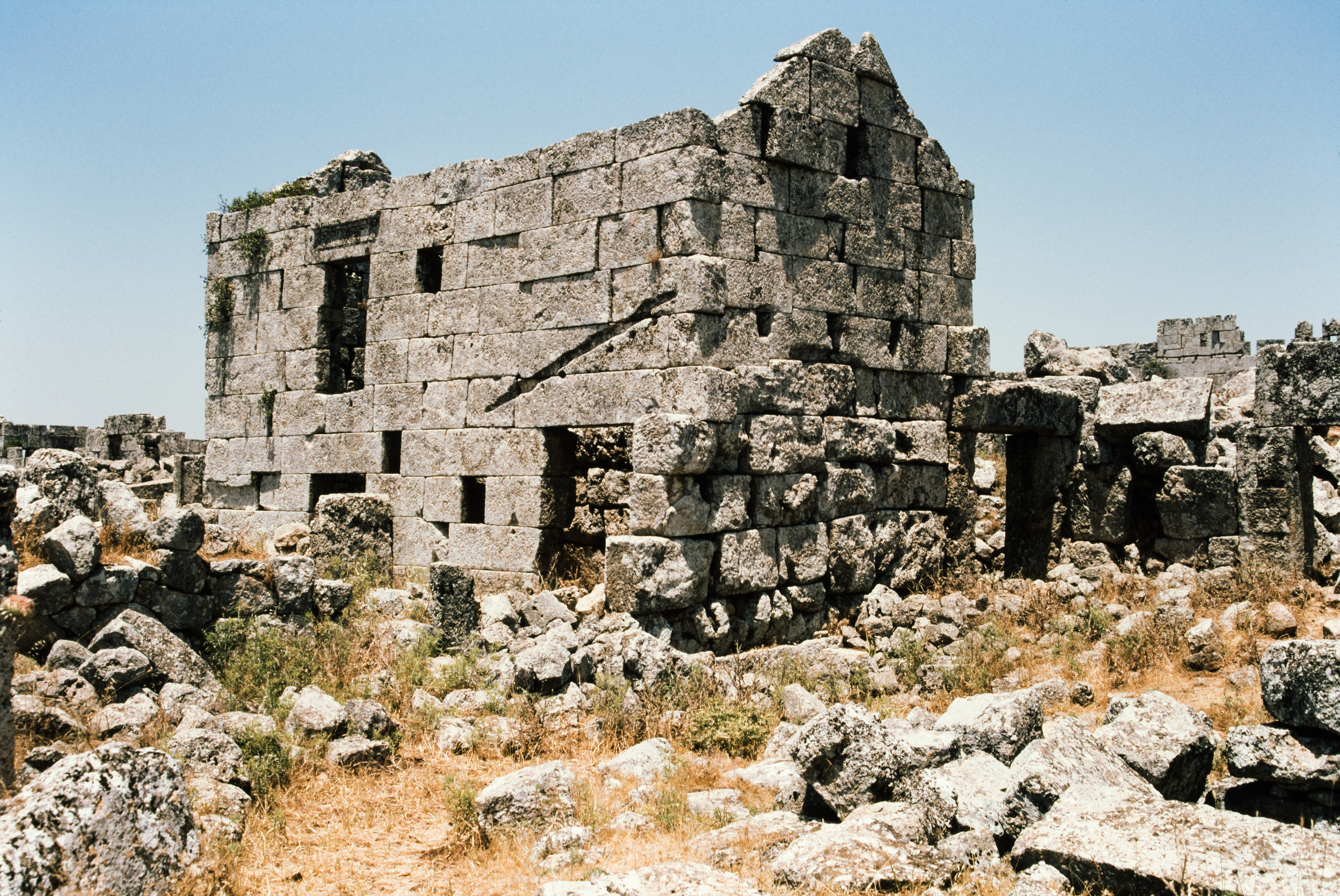

- Location within Syria Location within Near East
- 36°10′26″N 36°35′7″E
- Type: Village
- Location: Syria
- Region: Middle East

History
- Abandoned: Yes

Qirqbize ((Arabic قرقبيزه) also Kirkbize or Kirkbizeh) was an early Byzantine settlement in northwest Syria. The ruins are important for the history of early Christianity, as the remains of the earliest preserved house church after Dura-Europos from the beginning of the 4th century are located here. The place was inhabited from the Roman period until at least the 7th century. Howard Crosby Butler investigated the site in 1899, George Tchalenko conducted excavations in 1939 and until 1971.

== House church ==
A rural house in Roman times (2nd century) had two rooms that were connected by a door and each had an access from the southern long side. A portico supported by columns or pillars was built along this side. The gable roof, constructed from wooden beams, was shaped like a Greek temple. The first Christians initially gathered in private houses, which they converted into house churches. First, the partition between the living room and the pantry was removed so that a larger room was created, which - as prescribed for the later church buildings - was oriented to the east.

The oldest known house church in Dura-Europos, which was rebuilt around the year 232, was created, like Qirqbize, by merging the living and adjoining rooms. The local mud brick town house with a central courtyard had a long rectangular prayer room inside, but it was only the house church of Qirqbize that took on the architectural form of a hall church, from which the multi-aisled basilica was developed.

A pedestal for the altar was set up in the eastern part of the house, which dates back to the 3rd century and measures 15 × 7.5 meters; a triumphal arch typical of an apse was added later. The clergy took their seats on this raised installation with seating for 14 people during the divine service. Already in Qirqbize there was a spatial separation of lay people and clergy.

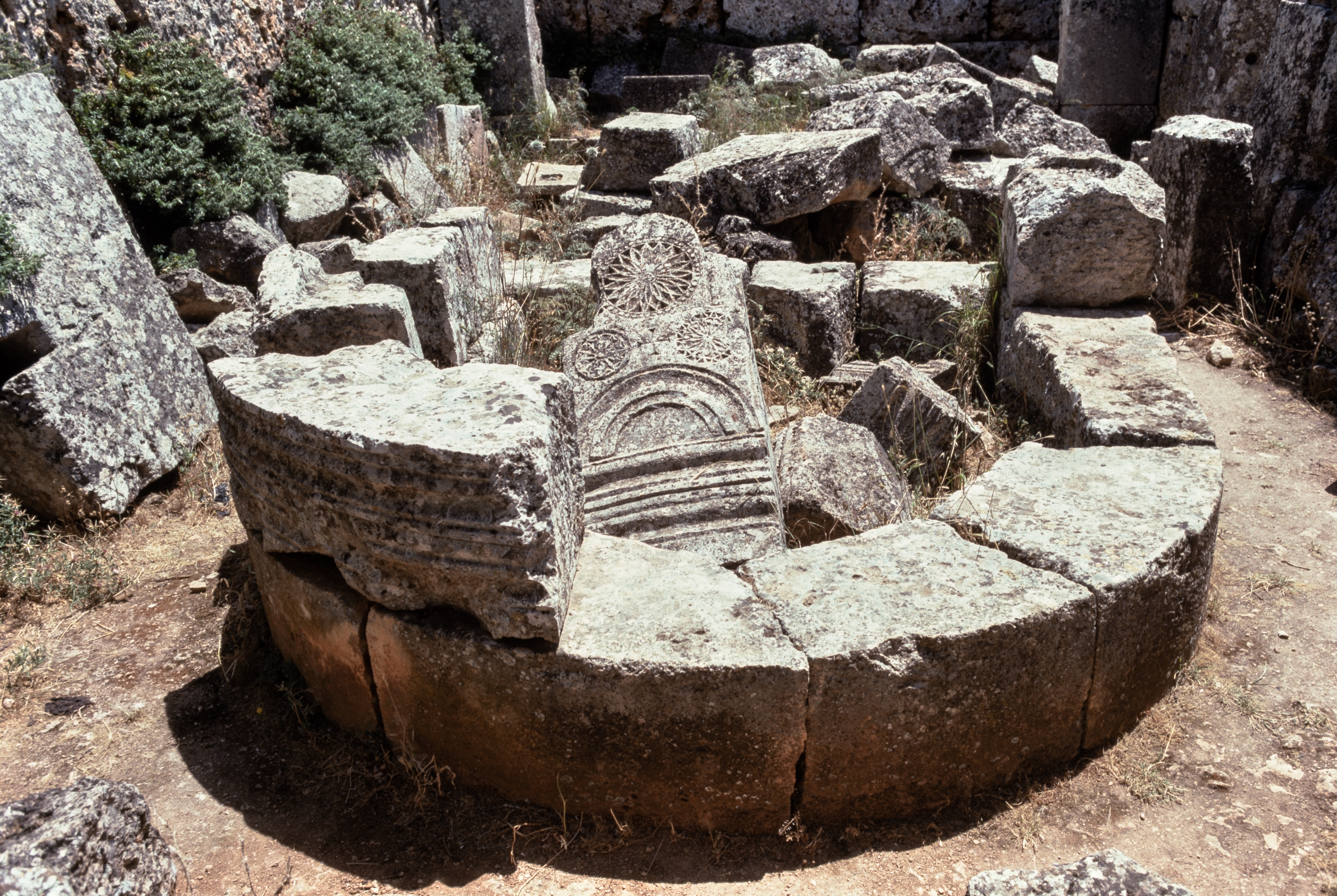
Bema of the church

There were two entrances in the south wall, the other sides were closed. The windows were rectangular and there was no roof cornice. In a second construction phase, a portico column was added in front of the south wall. Four capitals of this have survived, which are dated to the end of the 5th or 6th century.

The later church buildings had a three-part apse in the east, divided into functional areas, with a diaconicon at the side and a reliquary (martyrion). A stone sarcophagus with a relic was placed in the northern area of the local chancel. Oil poured in from above flowed over the bones of the venerated saint and out below, where it was caught and collected in clay bottles (ampoules). Pilgrims took such vessels with them as good luck souvenirs. The olive oil use is related to the culture of olive trees, which was important for the economy of northern Syria.
