= Andron (physician) =

Andron (Ancient Greek: Ἄνδρων) was a physician of ancient Greece who is supposed by André Tiraqueau, and after him by Johann Albert Fabricius, to be the same person as Andreas of Carystus. Other scholars have concluded this to be a mistake which has arisen from earlier writers reading "Andron" in the works of Pliny the Elder instead of "Andreas".

Andron is mentioned by Athenaeus, and several of his medical prescriptions are preserved by Aulus Cornelius Celsus, Galen, Caelius Aurelianus, Oribasius, Aëtius of Amida, Paulus Aegineta, and other ancient writers. None of his works are in existence, nor is anything known of the events of his life; and with respect to his date, it can only be said with certainty that, as Celsus is the earliest author who mentions him, he must have lived in or before the 1st century BCE.
