= Andronik Rudenko =

Greek-Catholic priest (1894–1951)

Andronik Dmitrievich Rudenko (Russian: Андроник Дмитриевич Руденко; 17 May 1894, Chernyshi, Kiev Governorate, Russian Empire – 5 May 1951, Nakhodka, USSR) was a Greek-Catholic priest and a convert from Russian Orthodoxy.

== Biography ==
Andronik Rudenko was born on 17 May 1894 in the village of Chernyshi, Kiev Governorate, in the family of an Orthodox priest. In 1905 the family lived in the Stavishche village, Tarashcha County. On 5 June 1912 he graduated from the Kiev real school, from September 1913 he worked as a teacher in the Stavishche village. In 1915 Rudenko graduated from the military academy in Kiev and sent to the front of a junior officer in an infantry battalion. On 30 November 1916 he was promoted to second lieutenant. He was awarded the Order of Saint Stanislaus 3rd degree. On 21 September 1917 Rudenko was awarded to the rank of captain. On 1 February 1918 he was demobilized from the army. Entered the Kiev Theological Academy, from 1919 at the same time he studied at the Faculty of History and Philology of the University of Kiev. Father Michael Cegielski received him into the Catholic Church. After that, his father and brother, who was also an Orthodox priest, broke relations with him. In 1920 was ordained a priest of the Byzantine rite. Zhitomir diocese administrator, Theophilus Skalski, sent him to serve in the parish of Saint John the Divine in the Vinarovka village, Stavysche district. Rudenko soon received permission to serve in Latin and in the eastern rites. In 1928 he was sent to serve as a curate in the parish of Saint Alexander in Kiev, in 1929 in the parish in the Yanushpol village and more later transferred to Chudnov. In 1935 again transferred to Yanushpol. In March 1935, when the local authorities decided to close the church in the village of Yanushpol, he went to Moscow, where he met with Bishop Pius Neve, asked him to transfer to another location in the event of closure of the temple. On 22 August 1935 Rudenko was arrested in the village of Yanushpol. On 13 December the same year, was sentenced to 7 years in labor camps. Rudovenko was sent under escort to Norillag, however, in June, along with the criminals fled the train at the Krasnoyarsk station. Got to Moscow, where he sought the help of Pius Neve.

He secretly lived in different localities of the Ukrainian SSR, while continuing to carry the priestly ministry. On 11 December 1938 he was arrested. On 25 September 1939 Rudenko was sentenced to 10 years in labor camps. On 18 April 1940 arrived in Vladivostok. On 27 May 1940 the medical board in a transit camp in Vladivostok gave opinion on the state of his health - "compensatory heart disease", but despite this, it was sent to Magadan on 14 July. He graduated from the medical assistant courses and in February 1945 he worked paramedic camp infirmary. On 11 January 1947 sent to Nakhodka. On 2 September 1947 he was arrested in the camp and sent to the internal Magadan prison. On 15 September he was charged with "anti-Soviet agitation and participation in a counter-revolutionary organization." On 25 January 1948 Rudenko has been ascertained stroke in therefore the investigation against him was suspended and the defendant was sent to the camp hospital, where he remained until 7 July. On 4 November the same year he was sentenced to 10 years in labor camps.

On 6 October 1950 due to a sharp deterioration in the health in Nakhodka taken out and placed in a hospital, where he died on 5 May 1951.
