= Andronik Stepovych =

Slavic historian

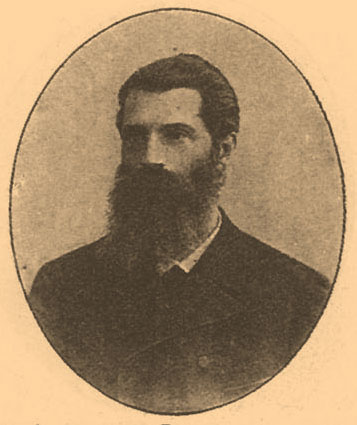
Portrait in the Brockhaus and Efron Encyclopedic Dictionary

Andronyk Ioanykiyovych Dudka-Stepovych (Russian: Андроник Иоанникиевич Дудка-Степович, Andronik Ioannikievich Dudka-Stepovich; Ukrainian: Андроник Іоаникійович Дудка-Степович; 1856–1936) was a historian of Slavic studies, literary theorist specializing in the history of literature and translator of various Slavic works.

Stepovych was a contributing editor of the Kievan historical magazine Kievskaya starina. He also was editing articles for the Brockhaus and Efron Encyclopedic Dictionary.

== Bibliography ==
- «Очерк истории чешской литературы» (Outline of history of Czech literature), 1886
- «Очерки из истории славянских литератур» (Essays on history of Slavic literatures), 1893
- «Очерки истории сербохорватской литературы» (Outline of history of Serbo-Croatian literature), 1899
