= Kievskaia starina =

Ethographic and literary chronicle

Kievan Past
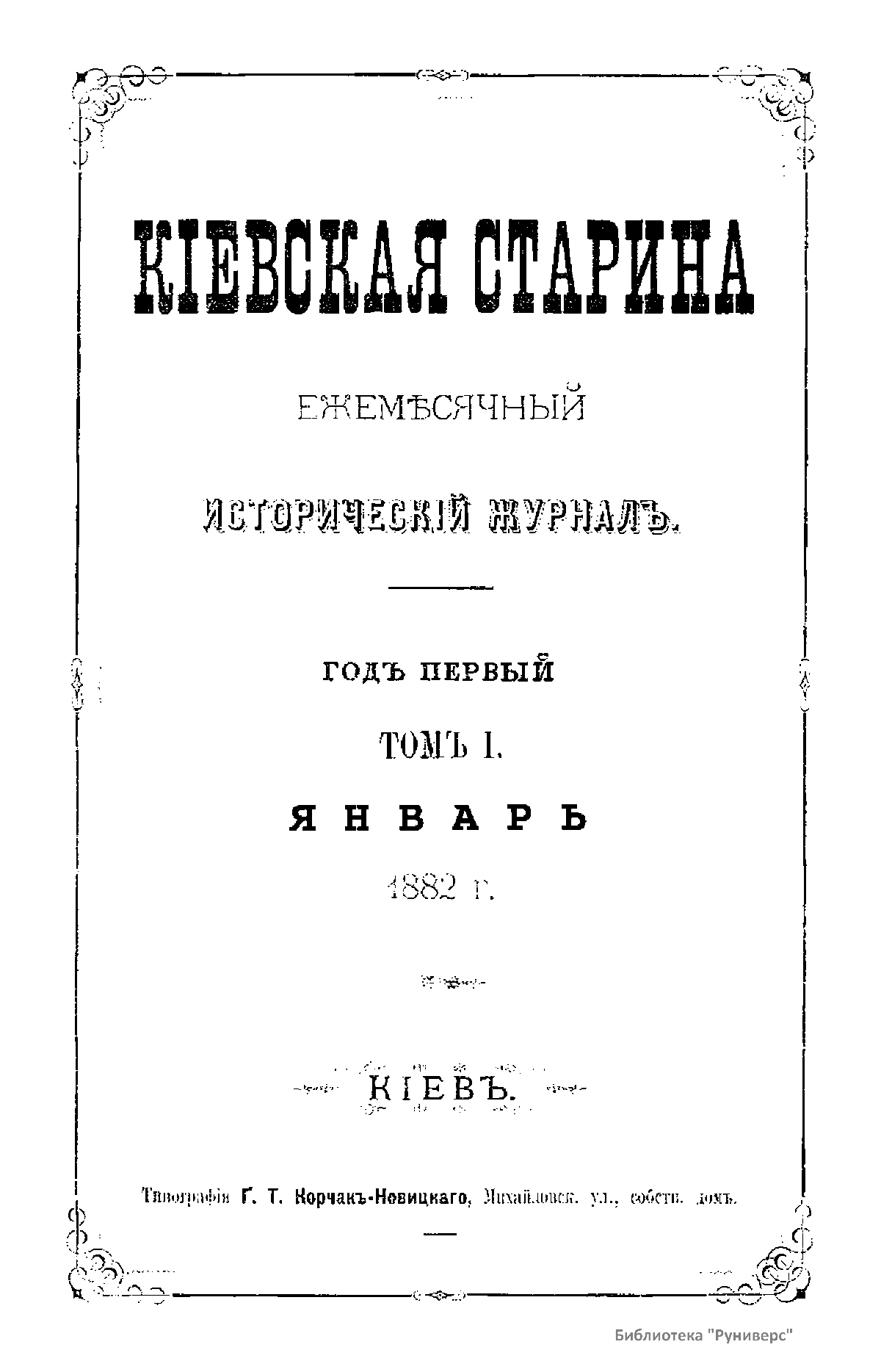
- Type: Monthly
- Format: Broadsheet
- Editor-in-chief: Feofan Lebedintsev (founder)
- Founded: 1 February 1882
- Ceased publication: 1907
- Political alignment: Historically ethographic and literal chronicles
- Language: Russian, Ukrainian
- Headquarters: Kyiv
- Circulation: Kyiv city

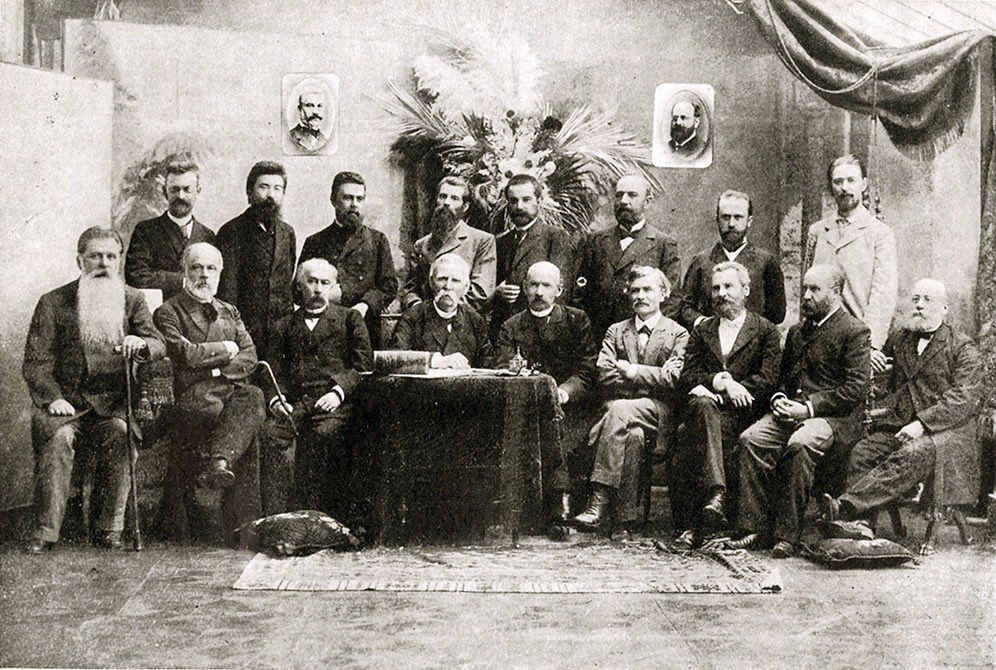
Celebration of the Kievskaia starina 15th anniversary, 1898; sitting Zhytetsky, Lazarevskyi, Tarnovskyi, Chalyi, Shuhurov, Antonovych, Mykhalchuk, A.Storozhenko, Shcherbyna; standing Kivlytskyi, Vasylenko, Stepovych, Molchanovskyi, Levytskyi, M.Storozhenko, Miakotin

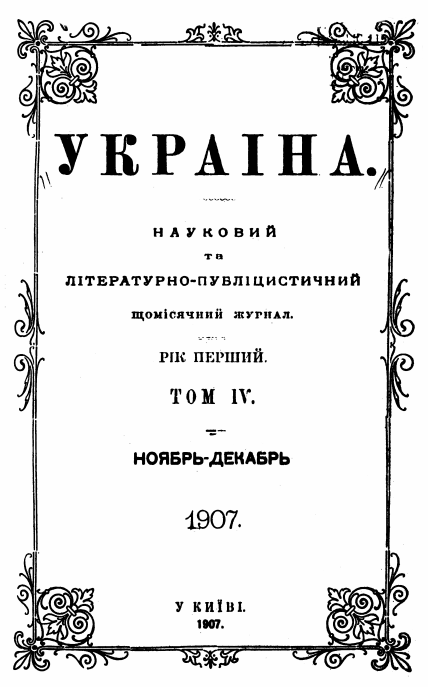
Ukrayina magazine, 1907

Kievskaia starina (Russian: Киевская старина, literally "Kievan antiquity") was a monthly historically ethographic and literary chronicle. It was published in Kyiv during 1882–1907 in Russian, and then in Ukrainian in 1906.

In this magazine in 1884 was published the first prose work of Taras Shevchenko, published in the Russian language, "Knyaginya" ("The Princess").

In the last year of its existence (1906) when censorship on Ukrainian language was dropped, the periodical was renamed Ukraina ("Ukraine") and was published in Ukrainian. The monthly chronicle played a major role in development of Ukrainian culture under the conditions of the Russian Empire. Together with the periodical worked such people as Volodymyr Antonovych, Dmytro Bahaliy, Mykola Kostomarov, Pavlo Zhytetsky, Orest Levytsky, Oleksandr Yefymenko, Oleksandr Lazarevsky, and others.

Main sponsor of the magazine was Hryhoriy Galagan.

Along with the magazine, in 1899 Mykola Biliashivskyi started to publish his Arkheologicheskaia letopis Yuzhnoi Rossii (Archaeological chronicle of southern Russia) at first as an addition, but in 1901–1905 as a separate magazine.

After Kievaskaia starina ceased to be published, in 1907 Naumenko continued to publish a monthly magazine under name Ukraina for a year.

In the late Soviet period attempts were made to revive the magazine in 1970s, but only since 1992 Petro Tolochko managed to establish a magazine of the National Academy of Sciences of Ukraine, Kyivska starovyna which is published in Ukrainian.

== History ==
=== Prerequisites ===
The desire of the Ukrainian intelligentsia to have a separate historical journal is due to the fact that materials on Ukrainian history were published in the Russian Empire in Russian publications, which reflect the Russian view of the history of Ukraine.

Before the appearance of Kievskaia starina, Ukrainian magazines or collections had mainly literary and ethnographic orientation without historical emphasis. Among them are "Ukrainian Herald", "Ukrainian Journal", "Zaporozhye starina" and others.

In particular, the rector of the University of Kiev, Mikhail Maksimovich, in the 1840s asked Emperor Nicholas I for permission to establish a historical journal in Kiev. The monarch gave a negative answer.

=== Establishment of the magazine ===
Talks between Oleksandr Lazarevsky and Volodymyr Antonovych about the establishment of a Ukrainian magazine in Ukraine have been going on since 1879. It is known that in 1881 preparatory work was carried out for the founding of the magazine, editorial meetings were held, a publication plan was developed, articles, reviews, and notes were prepared. Representatives of the Kyiv Old Community took part in the magazine: Volodymyr Antonovych, Oleksandr Lazarevsky, Mykola Petrov, Pavlo Zhytetsky, Oleksandr Kistiakivsky, Orest Levitsky and others. The financial part of the publication was supported by Vasyl Symyrenko, who transferred 25,000 rubles to Ukrainian affairs.

The founders of the future edition wanted to see a person loyal to the Old Community, as well as "trustworthy for St. Petersburg". The organizing committee of the future edition was formed of Volodymyr Antonovych, Oleksandr Lazarevsky, Feofan and Petro Lebedyntsev, Mykola Petrov and Orest Levitsky. Lazarevsky insisted on a paid fee for the publication's staff. However, he, together with Antonovych and Levitsky, refused to pay for their work.

The names Ukrainian Antiquity, Zaporizhzhia Antiquity, Ukrainian Archive were offered, but the founders settled on the compromise name Kiev Antiquity. On August 4, 1881, a letter was sent to the Main Directorate for Printing with the program and title of the future edition for approval.

According to Volodymyr Antonovych, the editor of the new edition could be the cathedral archpriest of St. Sophia Cathedral Peter Lebedintsev. However, he recommended his younger brother, Theophanes, who had served in the Kingdom of Poland for 16 years, had Russian state awards, and gained editorial experience in the Kyiv Diocesan Gazette. Feofan Lebedintsev agreed and after his resignation as an official on August 29, 1880, he joined the founding of Kiev Antiquity. On April 29, 1881, during a meeting of Volodymyr Antonovych, Pylyp Ternovsky, Oleksandr Kistiakivsky, Stepan Golubev, and Igor Malyshevsky, it was decided to elect Feofan Lebedyntsev as the first editor of the publication.

The program of the magazine was approved by the Minister of Internal Affairs Mykola Ignatiev on October 17, 1881.

=== The first period: edited by Feofan Lebedintsev ===
In the first period of the magazine each issue was printed with 10 to 12 leaves. Significant oppression of the Ukrainian language in the Russian Empire did not affect the journal's materials and its research and archaeographical publications.

The publication was scarce, and profits did not exceed expenditures. Therefore, Lebedyntsev was looking for ways to transfer the publication to another owner. This situation has gained notoriety among the public and the scientific community. It was proposed to move the publication to Kharkiv entitled Yuzhnorusskaia Starina, but this did not happen.

From 1882, on the initiative of Feofan Lebedyntsev and Stepan Ponomarev, an "Alphabetical Index of Personal Names and Remarkable Places and Objects" was compiled for each volume of the magazine. In 1893, the first systematic index of the content of Kiev Antiquity for the first decade, compiled by Vladimir Naumenko.

Lebedintsev's editorial board united Ukrainian historical scholars, thus creating interest in Ukrainian studies in the Russian Empire. Under the editorship of Lebedyntsev, the publication was noted as moderate. At this stage, the formation of the publication as a scientific center of Kiev Antiquity. The last issue of 1887 contained a statement by the editor that the publication was temporarily suspended due to the editor's illness and difficult situation.

=== Unofficial body of the Old Community ===
Activists of the Old Community offered Oleksandr Lashkevych to head the magazine. December 4, 1887 signed an agreement to transfer the rights to publish Kiev antiquity from Lebedyntsev to Lashkevich for 2,000 rubles. On February 13, 1888, the police department approved Lashkevich as editor-in-chief of the Kyiv Antiquities publishing house. The first book, signed by the new editor, was published in March 1888. Fedor Myshchenko became the actual editor of this volume. Under Lashkevich, the publication expanded the publication of documents, notes and criticism. A separate department of references and bibliography was created for this purpose. An index of the edition for 1882–1887 was created. The appearance of the magazine was changed, the cover became blue, the quality of the paper improved, the length of each issue has been increased to 18 to 20 leaves. Chronologies and thematic boundaries of the magazine are widespread. New departments were Criticism, Bibliographic Leaflet, For References.

== Chief editors ==
- 1882-1887 Feofan Lebedyntsev
- 1887-1889 Oleksandr Lashkevych
- 1890-1896 Yevhen Kivlytskyi
- 1893-1906 Volodymyr Pavlovych Naumenko
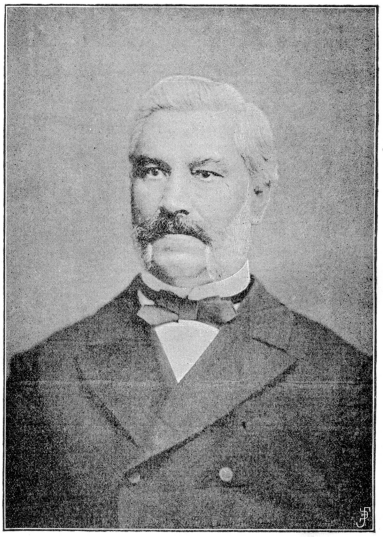
Lebedintsev

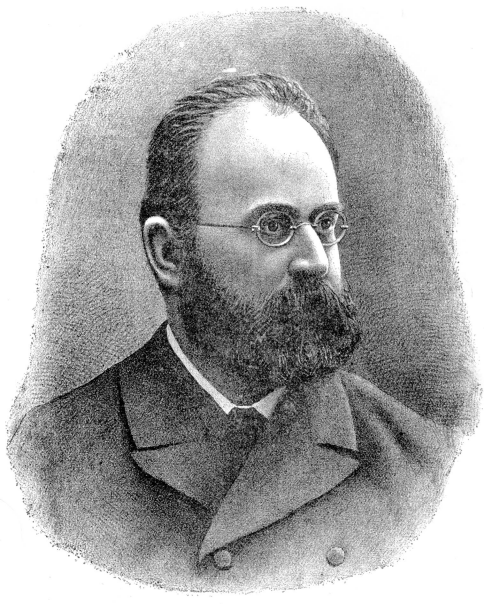
Lashkevych

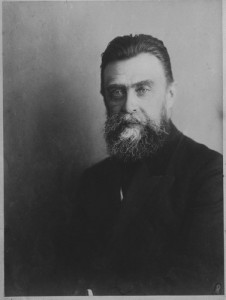
Naumenko

== See also ==
- Osnova
