= Deir Sharqi =

Deir Sharqi دير شرقي Dayr al-Sharqi
- Village
- Location in Syria
- Coordinates: 35°36′18″N 36°42′41″E
- Country: Syria
- Governorate: Idlib
- District: Maarat al-Numan
- Subdistrict: Maarat al-Numan

Population (2004)
  - Total: 4,429
- Time zone: UTC+2 (EET)
  - Summer (DST): UTC+3 (EEST)

Deir Sharqi (Arabic: دير شرقي, also spelled Dayr al-Sharqi), historically called Dayr al-Naqira or Dayr Sim'an, is a village administratively belonging to the Idlib Governorate in northwestern Syria. Nearby localities include the mantiqah ("district") center of Maarrat al-Numan located 5 kilometres (3.1 mi) to the northwest, Maar Shamshah to the north, Maar Shamarin and Tell Mannas to the northeast, Jarjnaz to the east, al-Tah to the south, Hish to the southwest and Basqala, Hass and Kafr Nabl to the west. According to the Syria Central Bureau of Statistics, Deir Sharqi had a population of 4,429 in the 2004 census.

Deir Sharqi contains a Byzantine-era church dated to 361 CE. A notable mosaic was found in the building. Deir Sharqi was historically known as Dayr al-Naqira, taking its name after a nearby hill. The historian Irfan Shahid theorized that the village had been a 4th-century Tanukhid settlement named after the Naqira (or Nuqayra) in Iraq that was likewise settled by the Tanukh and other Arab tribesmen. Dayr al-Naqira in turn is identified with Dayr Sim'an, the village where the Umayyad caliph Umar II died and was buried. Also buried in Dayr al-Naqira, in the same tomb structure as Umar II, was the 12th-century Muslim ascetic Abu Zakariya Yahya ibn al-Mansur al-Maghribi, who had been visited by Saladin. Abu Zakariya had secluded himself in the village. The date of the structure's construction is not known. Around 1970, the headstone bearing Umar's name had been relocated the house of the village's mukhtar (headman) until the Syrian government completed its planned renovation of the site. The graves were vandalized during the Syrian civil war.

== Bibliography ==
- Campbell, Sheila Diana (1991). The Mosaics of Aphrodisias in Caria: The Corpus of Mosaic Pavements in Turkey 2. PIMS. ISBN 0888443676.
- Dickie, James (January 1972). "Appendix on the Tomb of Umar b. Abd al-Aziz". Islamic Quarterly. 16 (1).
- Morray, D. W. (1994). Haarmann, Ulrich (ed.). An Ayyubid Notable and His World: Ibn Al-ʻAdīm and Aleppo as Portrayed in His Biographical Dictionary of People Associated with the City. Leiden, New York and Koln: Brill. ISBN 90-04-09956-5.
- Shahid, Irfan (2006). Byzantium and the Arabs in the Fourth Century. Washington, D. C.: Dumbarton Oaks Research Library and Collection. ISBN 0-88402-116-5.
