= Northwestern Syria clashes (December 2022 – November 2024) =

Series of intensified clashes in Syria

Northwestern Syria clashes (2022–2024)
- Part of the Syrian civil war
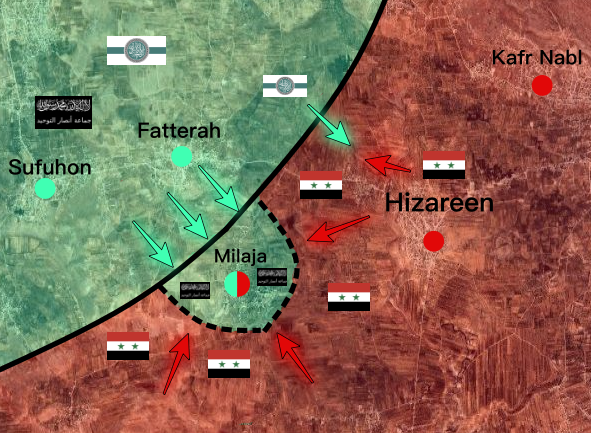
Date	2 December 2022 - 27 November 2024 (1 year, 11 months, 3 weeks and 4 days)
Location	Northwestern Syria: Idlib Governorate; Northwestern Aleppo Governorate; Northern Hama Governorate; Northern Latakia Governorate
Result	Inconclusive: Failure of Syrian–Turkish normalization; HTS launches an offensive in northwestern Syria in November 2024

Belligerents
Syrian Salvation Government; Ansar al Tawhid; Turkistan Islamic Party in Syria; Jama'at Ansar al-Islam	(Ba'athist Syria) Syrian Arab Republic; Hezbollah; Liwa Fatemiyoun; Russia

Commanders and leaders
Abu Mohammad al-Julani (HTS general commander)	(Ba'athist Syria) Bashar al-Assad (President of Syria) (Ba'athist Syria) Ali Mahmoud Abbas (Minister of Defense) (Ba'athist Syria) Maj. Gen. Ghassan Iskandar Tarraf (Republican Guard Commander) (Ba'athist Syria) Brig. Gen. Ibrahim Nasif † (Russia) Col. Oleg Viktorovich Pechevisty † (Commander-in-chief of the Russian special forces in Syria)

Units involved
Hay'at Tahrir al-Sham; National Front for Liberation; Sham Legion; Ahrar al-Sham; Suqour al-Sham; (Syrian opposition) Jaysh al-Nasr; 1st Coastal Division	Syrian Armed Forces; National Defence Forces; (Ba'athist Syria) Baqir Brigade

Casualties and losses
217 killed (Note: 2022: 4, 2023: 119 2024: 84+10); 17 killed 14 killed 12 killed	(Ba'athist Syria) 713 killed (Note: 2022: 45, 2023: 422+1 2024: 245) (Hezbollah) 7 killed 1 killed (Russia) 1 killed
- 221 civilians killed (Note: 2022: 1 2023: 164 2024: 45+11)

Starting on 2 December 2022, a series of intensified clashes broke out of the frontlines of the 'Idlib de-escalation zone' located in the governorates of Idlib, Aleppo, Hama and Latakia. These confrontations initiated through inghimasi, infiltration and sniper attacks by Hay'at Tahrir al-Sham (HTS) and allied militant groups against positions held by the pro-government Syrian Arab Army (SAA) positions. These attacks were called We Will Not Reconcile by HTS. In 2023, the first territorial offensive since 2020 was carried out by HTS in the area of Milaja.

According to the Syrian Observatory on Human Rights (SOHR), HTS aims to disrupt potential peace negotiations between Turkey and Syria, and is launching the campaign of attacks as a way of rejecting any deal made on the 'de-escalation zone' in Idlib. Consequently, 2023 was the deadliest year of the Syrian civil war since 2020, given the escalating intensity of the clashes.

== Timeline of clashes ==
=== December 2022 ===
On 2 December, a government soldier was shot dead during what the SOHR described as a HTS sniping attack in the western Aleppo countryside. On 3 December, an SAA lieutenant was shot dead in by a HTS sniper in the southern Idlib countryside. Between 6–7 December, two government soldiers and an HTS fighter were killed in clashes on the Idlib frontline, following a Syrian Army infiltration attack on a HTS position in the Al-Ghab Plain, according to SOHR.

On 11 December, clashes broke out after Syrian Army forces advanced on the village of Urum al-Sughra in the western Aleppo countryside. While at least two government soldiers were killed in an Inghimasi attack by HTS fighters on a Syrian Army position on the outskirts of the village of Dadikh on the Idlib frontline. The position was destroyed by HTS fighters after the attack. HTS attacked government military positions at Al-Bayda village in the Turkmen mountains on the Latakia/Idlib frontline, killing three government soldiers.

On 14 December, a government soldier was shot dead by HTS snipers on the Saraqib frontline. On 17 December, heavy clashes took place on the western Aleppo and Latakia frontlines, including heavy artillery bombardments and heavy machine gun fire. The clashes left one government soldier dead.

On 18 December, at least three soldiers were killed in a HTS infiltration on government positions near the village of Arbikh near Taftanaz, north of Saraqib on the Idlib frontline. HTS released footage of the attack the same day. HTS also launched an infiltration operation on a government military position in the town of Qubtan Al-Jabal in the western Aleppo countryside, killing at least three government soldiers and then blowing up the building government forces had been occupying. Footage of the attack was released by HTS.

On 20 December, an SAA lieutenant was killed after government forces attempted to infiltrate HTS positions on the Bastaron frontline in the western countryside of Aleppo. A government soldier was furthermore killed on the Al-Ghab frontline in the northwestern Hama governorate.

On 22 December, heavy clashes were reported on the Al-Fatirah, Maarat Moukhs, Al-Fatera frontlines in the southern Idlib countryside. Seven government soldiers and three HTS fighters were killed in the clashes.

On 23 December, two government soldiers were shot dead by HTS thermal snipers on the Saraqib frontline.

On 24 December, forces of HTS and Ahrar al-Sham launched a sniping operation on the Maarat Muzhas frontline, south of Idlib. Two government soldiers were killed in the operation.

Between 25 and 29 December three government soldiers and a civilian were killed in clashes on the frontline.

On 30 December, HTS targeted a Hezbollah vehicle with an ATGM, killing two soldiers and a Hezbollah commander.

=== January 2023 ===
Between 10 and 11 January 12 government soldiers and three HTS fighters were killed in three separate HTS inghimasi attack on SAA positions on the Bastrun frontline in the western Aleppo countryside, and Jabal Zawiya in the southern Idlib countryside.

On 14 January, HTS launched an inghimasi attack on SAA positions on the Nahshaba frontline in the Latakia countryside. Four government soldiers were killed and 2 others were injured in the attack. On the same day, a HTS fighter was killed after SAA forces launched an infiltration attempt on HTS positions on the Al-Nayrab frontline, west of Aleppo.

On 16 January, an SAA lieutenant was shot dead by a sniper of the opposition Coastal Division on the northern Latakia frontline. On the same day, a jihadist and French citizen by the name of 'Abu Hamza' was killed in an infiltration attack by Syrian forces on HTS position on the Jabal Zawiya frontline.

On 16 January, fighters of the al-Qaeda-affiliated Ansar al-Tawhid launched a suicide attack on SAA positions on the Maarat Muzhas frontline, south of Idlib. Two Ansar al-Tawhid fighters were killed in the attack. On the same day, a civilian was killed by government rocket fire on the Al-Bara frontline.

On 17 January, a government soldier was shot dead by a HTS sniper on the Saraqib frontline east of Idlib.

On 18 January, HTS launched an attack on government positions on the Urum al-Kubra frontline in the western countryside of Aleppo, leading to violent clashes between both sides. At least five government soldiers and three HTS fighters were killed in the clashes. Meanwhile, in the northwestern Hama region, a member of the Tiger Forces was killed by an HTS sniper.

On 22 January, a civilian and a government soldier were killed in clashes on the frontline in the western Aleppo countryside.

On 23 January, a government soldier was shot dead by a HTS sniper on the frontline near Nayrab, east of Idlib city. On the same day, two HTS fighters were killed and 4 others were wounded after SAA forces shelled HTS positions with heavy artillery on the Kafr Nouran frontline in the western Aleppo countryside.

On 24 January, Ahrar al-Sham fighters launched an attack on SAA forces on the Al-Tufahiyah frontline in the Latakia countryside. At least three government soldiers were killed in the attack. Also, a HTS fighter died of wounds sustained in clashes with government forces on the Sheikh Suleiman frontline in the Aleppo countryside.

On 26 January, two government soldiers were shot dead during a HTS sniping operation on the Dadikh frontline east of Idlib.

On 28 January, a government soldier was shot dead by a HTS sniper on the Maarat Mokhas frontline in the southern Idlib countryside.

On 30 January, two HTS fighters and two government soldiers were killed in exchanges of artillery fire on the western Aleppo frontline.

=== February 2023 ===
On 1 February, eight government soldiers including a major were killed, after HTS rockets hit one of the military headquarters of the government forces near the town of Kafr Rumah. Three government soldiers were killed later in the day by HTS sniper attacks, near the town of Kafr Nabl.

On 3 February, a government soldier was shot dead by a HTS sniper on the Saraqib frontiline. In the northern Latakia countryside, seven government soldiers and six HTS fighters were killed during an HTS attack on government positions.

On 5 February, one HTS fighter and one government soldier were killed in exchanges of rocket and artillery fire on the Idlib frontline.

Clashes reduced in the aftermath of the 2023 Turkey–Syria earthquake.

On 9 February, two government soldiers were killed in a HTS sniping campaign on the Kabani frontline in the Latakia countryside.

On 18 February, a government soldiers was killed in clashes on the western Aleppo countryside.

On 22 February, two government soldiers were killed in a HTS sniping campaign on the Afs frontline in the southern Idlib countryside.

On 25 February, a HTS fighter was killed and another was wounded after government army forces fired a missile at a HTS vehicle in Fuleyfel village in the southern Idlib countryside.

On 28 February, a soldier was killed by in a HTS attack on government positions on the Latakia frontline.

=== March 2023 ===
Between 1 and 2 March, two government soldiers and a fighter of Ahrar al-Sham were killed in clashes on the Al-Ghab Plain and Jabal al Turkmen areas of the frontline.

Between 4 and 5 March, three government soldiers were killed by a HTS sniper attacks on the Saraqib frontline and Atarib frontline, in the Idlib countryside.

Between 11 and 12 March, two government soldiers and a fighter of HTS were killed in clashes in Western Aleppo countryside.

In the evening on 16 March, HTS forces launched an inghimasi attack on government positions on the frontline near al-Fatatira village in the Southern Idlib countryside. At least five government soldiers were killed and another 6 were injured. This was the first HTS inghimasi attack since the recent earthquake.

On 17 March, two government soldiers were killed in a HTS infiltration operation on the Nahshaba frontline, in the Latakia countryside.

On 23 March, at least five HTS militants and five government soldiers were killed and several others were severely wounded after HTS forces launched infiltration attempt on Syrian Army positions on the western Aleppo countryside.

On 25 March, at least two government soldiers and an HTS militant were killed in a HTS infiltration attempt on Al-Ruwaiha frontline in southern Idlib countryside.

On 31 March, four government soldiers and an HTS fighter were killed during clashes in the southern Idlib countryside.

=== April 2023 ===
On 1 April, five government soldiers were killed during clashes near the 46th regiment in the western Aleppo countryside. A fighter of the al-Sham legion was also killed in and a government soldier were also killed in artillery bombardments elsewhere.

On 4 April, three government soldiers were killed and 4 others were injured in an infiltration attempt by HTS militants on the Jabal al-Zawiyah frontline in the southern Idlib countryside.

On 11 April, three government soldiers were killed and 9 others were wounded after HTS forces fired an AGTM at a Syrian Army truck on the frontline in the western countryside of Aleppo.

On 14 April, three government soldiers were killed during clashes in Western Hama and Aleppo countrysides. On the same day, a Syrian army tank was destroyed by an AGTM fired by opposition forces on the Kafr Nabl frontline, south of Idlib.

Between 19 and 20 April, seven government soldiers and a HTS militant were killed in clashes and infiltration attempts on the Idlib frontline.

=== May 2023 ===
Between 1 and 6 May, five government soldiers were killed and another 6 were injured in HTS attacks on the Idlib frontline.

On 26 May, commander-in-chief of the Russian special forces in Syria, colonel Oleg Viktorovich Pitchvesti was killed by HTS artillery strikes on a government military post on the Al-Jeb Al-Ahmar frontline in the Latakia countryside. Later in the day, Russian forces conducted their first airstrikes in Idlib Province since December, targeting HTS positions in the southern Idlib countryside.

Between 28 and 30, three government soldiers, including an Al-Baggara tribesman of the Baqir Brigade, were killed in clashes in the Idlib 'De-escalation' zone.

=== June 2023 ===
In early June, clashes reduced in intensity. Between 30 May and 8 June, only two government soldiers and a member of Suqour al-Sham had reportedly been killed in the clashes.

On 10 June, two government soldiers and a HTS special forces militant were killed in clashes on the Saraqib, al-Fatterah and Maaret Elnaasan frontlines Idlib countryside.

On 12 June, two HTS militants were killed by government army bombardments on the Kafr Nouran frontline, west of Aleppo city.

On 16 June, two HTS militants were killed whilst planting landmines on the Al-Bara frontline in the Idlib countryside.

On 21 June, three civilians were killed in the town of Kafr Nouran by SAA artillery shelling, and one civilian was killed in the town of Ain Al-Hamam by HTS shelling.

On 22 June, three civilians were killed in the government-held town of Tell Salhab by an unidentified drone attack. Additionally, in the town of Sarmin, two civilians were killed due to SAA shelling.

On 23 June, a government soldier was shot dead by a HTS sniper on the Kafr Nabl frontline. Later in the day, a civilian was killed in Qardaha, the hometown of the ruling Al-Assad family. The incident occurred when two rockets were fired from an unidentified drone.

On 24 June, two civilians were killed by Russian airstrikes near the village of Basbat, west of Jisr ash-Shughur. While a civilians was killed by an HTS drone attack in the town of Deir Shamil.

On 25 June, the Russian Air Force conducted the most intense air strikes in the Idlib province since the onset of the clashes. During these airstrikes six civilians and three HTS fighters were killed and 30 others were injured when a Russian aircraft bombed a vegetable market in the outskirts of Jisr ash-Shughur. Additionally, in the outskirts of Idlib, three civilians and a Turkistan Islamic Party fighter were killed in the airstrikes.

On 27 June, eight HTS fighters were killed by Russian airstrikes which targeted their headquarters in the Zawiya Mountain region, south of Idlib.

=== July 2023 ===
On 4 July, four civilians were killed in the town of Urum al-Kubra by HTS shelling.

Clashes continued throughout July, resulting in several deaths and injuries.

=== August 2023 ===
August 2023 was highlighted by an increase of Russian airstrikes on opposition targets and the first ground offensive on the Idlib frontline since March 2020.

On 5 August, three civilians of the same family were killed in a Russian airstrike in the countryside west of Idlib.

On 6 August, nine government soldiers were killed in an opposition infiltration operation on the Nabi Younis frontline in Latakia.

On 8 August, six government soldiers were killed in bombardments and sniping attacks on the Idlib and Latakia frontlines.

On 9–10 August, two government soldiers and two civilians were killed in clashes on the Idlib frontline.

On 21 August, at least 13 HTS militants were killed in a series of six Russian airstrikes on a house in Kurin in the southwestern outskirts of Idlib city.

On 22 August, at least three HTS fighters were killed and many other were injured after Russian warplanes bombed a HTS monitoring headquarters near Maarrat Misrin in the Idlib countryside. One militant later died of injuries, bringing the death toll to 4. Later in the day, two civilians were also killed by a Russian airstrike on an abandoned water station near the village of Ein Shib, in the Idlib countryside.

On 24 August, seven HTS fighters were killed and four others were injured by SAA artillery fire on the Kafr Taal frontline in the western Aleppo countryside.

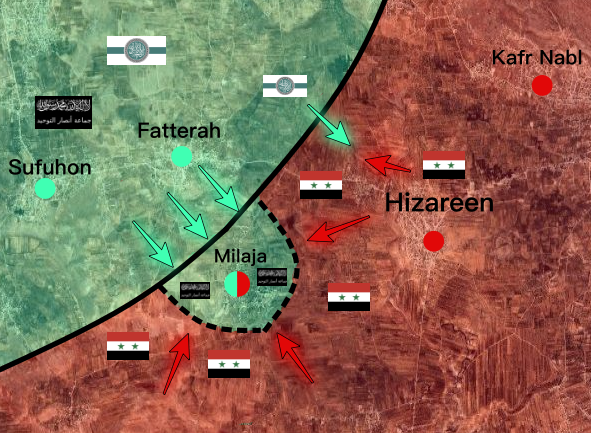
Analysis of the military situation on the Milaja frontline in Syria on 26 August 2023

On 26 August, fighters from Ansar al Tawhid launched a large scale attack on Syrian Army forces in the village of Milaja in the southern Idlib countryside. The attack began with the detonation of a tunnel bomb and then a ground attack on the frontline. After violent clashes, Ansar al-Tawhid captured the village from SAA forces, killing 11 SAA soldiers and wounding over 20 others. The jihadists partially withdrew from the village amid Russian airstrikes on opposition supply lines. At least two jihadis were killed. This was the first time the Idlib frontline had changed since March 2020.

On 27 August, violent clashes continued in Milaja as SAA forces attempted to recapture lost military posts still occupied by Ansar al-Tawhid. Two SAA soldiers were killed in counter-attacks by government forces in Milaja. Later in the evening, Syrian Army forces again attacked Milaja village, killing five Ansar al-Tawhid fighters in an attempt to capture lost positions. Six SAA soldiers were killed in overnight clashes.

On 29 August, five government soldiers were killed and four others were wounded during an SAA infiltration attempt on the Nahshabah frontline in the Latakia countryside.

On 30 August, Russian warplanes launched airstrikes on opposition positions on the Milaja frontline amid heavy SAA artillery bombardment at the same time. One SAA soldier was also killed in a sniping attack on this frontline.

On 31 August, two government soldiers were killed and another was injured by HTS artillery fire on the Milaja frontline.

During the month of August 2023, 113 people were killed in clashes in northwestern Syria including 69 government soldiers, 30 fighters of Al-Fatah al-Mubin and 14 civilians, making the month the deadliest since the 'Putin-Erdogan' ceasefire was declared.

=== September 2023 ===
On 1 September 16 government soldiers and three HTS militants were killed in a HTS infiltration attack on SAA positions on the Saraf frontline in Latakia. On the same day, three government soldiers were killed whilst attacking opposition positions in Milaja.

On 2 September, five government soldiers were killed by an HTS attack on the Kafr Taal frontline western of Aleppo. Meanwhile, two government soldiers were killed in clashes in Mijala village in the southern Idlib countryside.

On 3 September, close to midnight, SAA forces launched an infiltration attack towards Ansar al-Tawhid positions on the Mijala frontline. One SAA soldier and one Ansar al-Tawhid militant were killed in the clashes.

On 4 September, two government soldiers were blown up and killed by a HTS guided missile on the Tel Al-Malek frontline in the western Aleppo countryside.

Between 5 and 6 September, four SAA soldiers were killed in an ambush by Ansar al-Tawhid militants on the Milaja frontline, following earlier clashes in the day that killed four SAA soldiers and the destruction of an SAA tank by HTS militants on the nearby Hizareen frontline. Following these clashes, on 6 September, five Ansar al-Tawhid militants were killed by Russian airstrikes on Fatterah.

On 12 September, Ansar al-Tawhid militants destroyed a Syrian Army BMP on the Milaja frontline, killing two Syrian soldiers.

On 15 September, nine Syrian soldiers were killed in a series of HTS attacks on the Latakia frontline.

On 23 September, HTS forces destroyed a SAA tank with a guided missile in the town of Hizareen after violent shelling took place across the Idlib frontline. On the same day, 2 civilians were killed and another 2 were wounded by Syrian Army artillery fire on the Al-Iskan area near Sarmin.

On 24 September, one SAA soldier was killed and another was injured during an attack on the Milaja frontline by Ansar al-Tawhid militants.

On 25 September, a civilian was killed by HTS shelling in the town of Shathah in the Hama countryside and a SAA soldier was also killed by a rebel sniper on the Milaja frontline.

On 30 September, two SAA soldiers were killed by HTS snipers on the Milaja frontline, in southern Idlib countryside.

=== October 2023 ===
On 1 October, an SAA soldier was killed on the Milaja frontline during artillery duels.

On 3 October, two SAA soldiers were killed on the Milaja frontline by HTS snipers.

On 5 October, a drone attack targeted a military graduation ceremony in the city of Homs, killing over 123 people. Following the attack, the Syrian Army launched a large-scale bombing campaign at Idlib, killing at least 24 civilians and wounding 37 others.

On 6 October, two SAA soldiers were killed by HTS snipers on the Milaja frontline, southern Idlib.

On 7 October, seven civilians were killed by SAA artillery shelling in the town of Ariha, and two civilians were killed by HTS drone attacks near the town of Qardaha.

On 19 October 8 HTS members were killed by SAA artillery bombardments on the Fatterah area of frontline in the southern countryside of Idlib.

On 22 October 6 civilians were killed in SAA artillery attacks in the village of Qarqur.

On 27 October 3 Syrian soldiers were killed in an infiltration operation by opposition forces on the Al-Baydaa frontline in Latakia.

=== November 2023 ===
On 8 November 3 SAA soldiers and a HTS fighter were killed in clashes on the Idlib frontline.

Between 9–13 November, 5 SAA soldiers and a HTS militant were killed in clashes on the Idlib frontline.

On 20 November 3 SAA soldiers were killed in clashes on the Latakia frontline.

On 25 November 10 civilians were killed in SAA artillery shelling on Qoqfin village, in the southern Idlib countryside.

Between 26 and 27 November 2 SAA soldiers, a HTS militant and a fighter of the NFL group were killed in clashes on the Idlib frontline.

On 29 November 3 SAA soldiers were killed in various HTS sniper attacks on the Idlib and Aleppo frontlines.

=== December 2023 ===
After a year of intensified clashes on the Northwestern frontline, a total of 711 people were killed, including 426 Syrian Army soldiers and militiamen, 152 HTS/opposition fighters and 127 civilians.

Between 3 and 4 December 4 SAA soldiers and a fighter of HTS were killed in clashes on the Idlib frontline.

On 7 December 11 SAA soldiers and 6 HTS fighters were killed in a HTS infiltration attack on the Urum al-Sughra frontline, in the western Aleppo countryside.

On 9 December 7 civilians were killed by SAA heavy artillery shelling on various parts of the frontline.

On 17 December 5 SAA soldiers were killed in an infiltration operation by Ansar al-Tawhid militants on the Tallat Shir Sahab frotnline in the Latakia countryside.

On the same day, 6 civilians were killed by SAA artillery shelling on the town of Darat Izza in the Aleppo countryside.

A further 2 civilians were also killed by SAA artillery in the village of Al-Ebizmo, Aleppo.

On 20 December, an SAA Brigadier General was killed by opposition artillery fire on the Al-Zawiyah frontline in Idlib.

On 25 December 5 civilians were killed in a Russian airstrike on a farm in the area between Armanaz and Al-Shaikh Bahr Forest north of Idlib.

On 29 December 3 HTS militants and 2 SAA soldiers were killed in clashes on the Idlib frontline.

=== January 2024 ===
On 8 January, Turkish Islamic Party fighters damaged a Syrian Army tank using a TOW missile near the village of Kinsabba in Latakia province.

On 20 January, two SAA soldiers were killed by HTS snipers on the Milaja frontline.

On 28 January, two children were killed by SAA bombardment on the outskirts of Maarrat Al-Na'saan in Idlib countryside. On 31 January, six HTS militants were killed by a suicide drone strike conducted by Iran-backed militias.

=== February 2024 ===
Between 10 and 11 February, three SAA soldiers and one HTS militant were killed in various sniping operations on the frontlines of north-western Syria.

On 12 February, four militants of the HTS 'Ansar al-Islam' group were killed Al-Sheikh Sandiyan Village in western Idlib countryside.

On 19 February, two HTS militants were killed after Syrian Army forces launched a thermal rocket targeting their positions in the village of Banin in the Idlib countryside.

Later in the day, two HTS fighters were killed in a kamikaze drone strike in Afs, Idlib and a fighter of a group working under the NFL was killed by a drone in near Al-Sarmaniyah village in the western countryside of Hama.

Between 26 and 27 February, four SAA soldiers, one HTS militant and a civilian were killed in clashes on the frontline in northwestern Syria.

=== March 2024 ===
On 3 March, five HTS militants were killed after trying to infiltrate SAA positions on the Nahshaba frontline in the Latakia countryside.

On 5 March, a HTS militant and two SAA soldiers were killed in clashes in northwestern Syria.

On 7 March, a HTS militant and a civilian were killed after an SAA kamikaze drone struck a HTS vehicle near Darat Izza, in the Aleppo countryside.

On 12 March, three SAA soldiers, including a captain, were killed in a HTS infiltration operation on the al-Tofahiya frontline in the Latakia countryside.

On 14 March, two SAA soldiers were shot dead in an HTS sniping operation on the Nakhashabah frontline in the Latakia countryside.

On 16 March, three SAA soldiers were killed in clashes on the frontline in northwestern Syria.

On 17 March, two SAA soldiers were killed and seven others were injured in an infiltration attack on the Qubtan Al-Jabal frontline in the western Aleppo countryside.

On 20 March, five SAA soldiers were killed and three others were injured in an infiltration operation carried out by HTS militants on the al-Kabinah frontline in the Latakia countryside.

Between 21 and 22 March, three SAA soldiers and a HTS militant were killed in clashes on the frontline in northwestern Syria.

On 26 March, five HTS militants were killed and one SAA soldier was killed in a HTS infiltration attack on SAA positions on the Barij area of the Jabal Zawiyah frontline, Idlib.

Between 28 and 29 March, four SAA soldiers were killed in HTS sniping attacks on the frontline in northwestern Syria.

On 29 March, three HTS militants were killed by an SAA suicide drone on a HTS pick-up truck on the frontline of Kharbah Al-Naquous in Sahil Al-Ghab area in western Hama countryside.

=== April 2024 ===
On 1 April, four SAA soldiers were killed in HTS sniping attacks on the Nakhshaba frontline in the Latakia countryside.

On 2 April, two SAA soldiers were killed in clashes with HTS on the Saraqib frontline, Idlib.

On 4 April, four SAA soldiers were shot and killed by HTS sniping attacks on the frontline in northwestern Syria.

On 5 April, a member of 'Ansar al-Islam' and a non-Syrian jihadist operating under HTS were killed by a SAA suicide drone on their military vehicle on the Al-Ankawy frontline in the Hama countryside.

=== May 2024 ===
On 3 May, two SAA soldiers were killed by HTS artillery attacks on the frontline.

On 9 May, two SAA soldiers were killed by HTS sniping attacks on the Saraqib frontline, in the Idlib frontline.

Between 14 and 15 May, two SAA soldiers and a HTS militant were killed in clashes on the frontline in northwestern Syria.

=== June 2024 ===
Between 2–7 June, 3 SAA soldiers and 2 HTS militants were killed in clashes on the frontline in northwestern Syria.

Between 7–10 June, 6 SAA soldiers and a HTS militant were killed in clashes on the frontline in northwestern Syria.

Between 12 and 14 June 3 SAA soldiers were killed in HTS sniping attacks on the frontlines in northwestern Syria.

=== July 2024 ===
On 11 July, a HTS militant was killed by a Russian airstrike on the outskirts of Jisr Al-Shughour city in the western countryside of Idlib.

On 22 July, two SAA soldiers were killed and six others were wounded in a mortar attack by Ansar al-Tawhid militants on the Milaja frontline.

Between 29 and 31 July 3 SAA soldiers and 2 HTS fighters were killed in clashes on the Idlib frontline.

=== August 2024 ===
Between 1–3 August, 5 SAA soldiers were killed in clashes on the Idlib frontline, including two on the Milaja frontline.

On 10 August 5 SAA soldiers were killed in clashes on the frontline in northwestern Syria, including 4 on the Latakia frontline.

On 16 August, two SAA soldiers were killed in HTS sniper attacks on the frontlines in northwestern Syria.

Between 26 and 27 August, four SAA soldiers were killed in HTS attacks on the frontlines in northwestern Syria

=== September 2024 ===
On 2 September, HTS forces captured two Syrian soldiers during an infiltration operation near the town of Kbashin in the western Aleppo countryside.

On 4 September, HTS launched an infiltration operation on the frontlines of Wai Kalaz and Al-Sarraf in Jabal Al-Turkman in the northern countryside of Latakia, killing 12 SAA soldiers.

On 7 September, three HTS fighters were killed in SAA artillery attacks on the southern and eastern Idlib frontlines.

On 21 September, two civilians were killed in SAA shelling on Taftanaz, Idlib.

On 24 September, six SAA soldiers were killed in a HTS infiltration operation on the Ain Eissa frontline, Latakia. Also, four civilians and a Turkistani fighter of HTS were killed in SAA shelling on positions near Balza and Taftanaz, Idlib.

On 25 September, two SAA soldiers and a HTS militant were killed in clashes on the frontline in northwestern Syria.

=== October 2024 ===
In October, HTS and government forces initiated a military buildup in the western countryside of Aleppo. HTS reportedly escalated its preparations for a large-scale offensive against government forces within the city of Aleppo.

Between 8–13 October, five SAA soldiers were killed in HTS attacks on the northwestern Syria frontline.

On 16 October 11 civilians were killed in Russian airstrikes on the outskirts of Idlib city.

=== November 2024 ===
Between 11 and 12 November, three SAA soldiers and one HTS militant were killed in clashes on the Idlib frontline.

On 17 November, one civilian and an SAA soldier were killed in clashes on the Idlib frontline.

On 27 November 2024, HTS launched a large scale offensive on government forces in northwest Syria.
