= Maar (disambiguation) =

Maar is a common type of volcanic crater.

Maar or MAAR may also refer to:

- Maar (album), an album by Evpatoria Report
- Maar (surname), list of people with the surname
- "Maar", meaning "people" in some Aboriginal Australian languages, as in the Eastern Maar, a group of Aboriginal peoples in Victoria, Australia
- Madzhakandila Anti-Aircraft Regiment, an artillery regiment of the South African Army

== See also ==
- Maar Dibsah, a Syrian village
- Maar Hattat, a Syrian village
- Maar Shamshah, a Syrian village
- Maar Shuhur, a Syrian village
- Maar Tamater, a Syrian village
- Modular Advanced Armed Robotic System (MAARS), a military robot
- Pocket Maar (1956 film), a Hindi film
- Pocket Maar (1974 film), another Hindi film
