= Qatra, Idlib =

Coordinates: 35°39′N 36°53′E

Qatra, Idlib قطرة
- Village
- Location in Syria
- Country: Syria
- Governorate: Idlib
- District: Maarrat al-Nu'man District
- Subdistrict: Sinjar Nahiyah

Population (2004)
  - Total: 357
- Time zone: UTC+2 (EET)
  - Summer (DST): UTC+3 (EEST)
- City Qrya Pcode: C4044

Qatra, Idlib (Arabic: قطرة) is a Syrian village located in Sinjar Nahiyah in Maarrat al-Nu'man District, Idlib. According to the Syria Central Bureau of Statistics (CBS), Qatra, Idlib had a population of 357 in 2004.
