= Mardagana Burtuqala =

Mardagana Burtuqala مردغانة برتقالة
- Village
- Location in Syria
- Country: Syria
- Governorate: Idlib
- District: Maarrat al-Nu'man District
- Subdistrict: Sinjar Nahiyah

Population (2004)
  - Total: 531
- Time zone: UTC+2 (EET)
  - Summer (DST): UTC+3 (EEST)
- City Qrya Pcode: C4041

Mardagana Burtuqala (Arabic: مردغانة برتقالة) is a Syrian village located in Sinjar Nahiyah in Maarrat al-Nu'man District, Idlib. According to the Syria Central Bureau of Statistics (CBS), Mardagana Burtuqala had a population of 531 in the 2004 census.
