= Bashkun =

Bashkun باشكون
- Village
- Location in Syria
- Coordinates: 35°27′00″N 37°05′00″E
- Country: Syria
- Governorate: Idlib
- District: Maarrat al-Nu'man District
- Subdistrict: Sinjar Nahiyah

Population (2004)
  - Total: 111
- Time zone: UTC+2 (EET)
  - Summer (DST): UTC+3 (EEST)
- City Qrya Pcode: C4010

Bashkun (Arabic: باشكون) is a Syrian village in Sinjar Nahiyah in Maarrat al-Nu'man District, Idlib. Bashkun had a population of 111 in the 2004 Syria Central Bureau of Statistics census.

== History ==
Bashkun was captured by ISIL in early December, 2017.
