= Abu Makki =

Abu Makki أبو مكي
- Village
- Location in Syria
- Coordinates: 35°36′39″N 36°49′19″E
- Country: Syria
- Governorate: Idlib
- District: Maarrat al-Nu'man District
- Subdistrict: Maarrat al-Nu'man Nahiyah

Population (2004)
  - Total: 2,455
- Time zone: UTC+2 (EET)
  - Summer (DST): UTC+3 (EEST)
- City Qrya Pcode: C3973

Abu Makki (Arabic: أبو مكي) is a Syrian village located in Maarrat al-Nu'man Nahiyah in Maarrat al-Nu'man District, Idlib. According to the Syria Central Bureau of Statistics (CBS), Abu Makki had a population of 2455 in the 2004 census.
