= Jahman, Idlib =

Coordinates: 35°36′N 37°06′E

Jahman, Idlib الجهمان
- Village
- Location in Syria
- Country: Syria
- Governorate: Idlib
- District: Maarrat al-Nu'man District
- Subdistrict: Sinjar Nahiyah

Population (2004)
  - Total: 944
- Time zone: UTC+2 (EET)
  - Summer (DST): UTC+3 (EEST)
- City Qrya Pcode: C4023

Jahman, Idlib (Arabic: الجهمان) is a Syrian village in Sinjar Nahiyah in Maarrat al-Nu'man District, Idlib. According to the Syria Central Bureau of Statistics, it had a population of 944 in the 2004 census.

== Syrian Civil War ==
The village of Jahman was under control of Syrian opposition forces by the beginning of 2015, but was retaken by the Assad government on 8 January 2018. It would remain under their control until Assad was overthrown in late 2024.
