= Thahrat Talamnas =

Thahrat Talamnas ظهرة تلمنس
- Village
- Location in Syria
- Coordinates: 35°38′20.051″N 36°43′1.902″E
- Country: Syria
- Governorate: Idlib
- District: Maarrat al-Nu'man District
- Subdistrict: Maarrat al-Nu'man Nahiyah

Population (2004)
  - Total: 899
- Time zone: UTC+2 (EET)
  - Summer (DST): UTC+3 (EEST)
- City Qrya Pcode: C3967

Thahrat Talamnas (Arabic: ظهرة تلمنس) is a Syrian village located in Maarrat al-Nu'man Nahiyah in Maarrat al-Nu'man District, Idlib. According to the Syria Central Bureau of Statistics (CBS), Thahrat Talamnas had a population of 899 in the 2004 census.
