= Jeb Elqasab =

Jeb Elqasab جب القصب
- Village
- Location in Syria
- Coordinates: 35.5145524°N 37.1035425°E
- Country: Syria
- Governorate: Idlib
- District: Maarrat al-Nu'man District
- Subdistrict: Sinjar Nahiyah

Population (2004)
  - Total: 293
- Time zone: UTC+2 (EET)
  - Summer (DST): UTC+3 (EEST)
- City Qrya Pcode: C3999

Jeb Elqasab (Arabic: جب القصب) is a Syrian village located in Sinjar Nahiyah in Maarrat al-Nu'man District, Idlib. According to the Syria Central Bureau of Statistics (CBS), Jeb Elqasab had a population of 293 in the 2004 census.
