= Maar Tahroma =

Maar Tahroma معرتحرمة
- Village
- Location in Syria
- Coordinates: 35°32′57″N 36°32′27″E
- Country: Syria
- Governorate: Idlib
- District: Maarrat al-Nu'man District
- Subdistrict: Kafr Nabl Nahiyah

Population (2004)
  - Total: 7,216
- Time zone: UTC+2 (EET)
  - Summer (DST): UTC+3 (EEST)
- City Qrya Pcode: C4071

Maar Tahroma (Arabic: معرتحرمة) is a Syrian village located in Kafr Nabl Nahiyah in Maarrat al-Nu'man District, Idlib. According to the Syria Central Bureau of Statistics (CBS), Maar Tahroma had a population of 7,216 in the 2004 census.
