= Jbala, Idlib =

Jbala جبالا
- Village
- Location in Syria
- Coordinates: 35°34′13″N 36°33′28″E
- Country: Syria
- Governorate: Idlib
- District: Maarrat al-Nu'man District
- Subdistrict: Kafr Nabl Nahiyah

Population (2004)
  - Total: 1,875
- Time zone: UTC+2 (EET)
  - Summer (DST): UTC+3 (EEST)
- City Qrya Pcode: C4050

Jbala (Arabic: جبالا) is a Syrian village located in Kafr Nabl Nahiyah in Maarrat al-Nu'man District, Idlib Governorate. According to the Syria Central Bureau of Statistics (CBS), Jbala had a population of 1,875 in the 2004 census.
