= Armanaya =

Armanaya أرمنايا
- Village
- Location in Syria Armanaya (Middle East)
- Coordinates: 35°34′03″N 36°37′33″E
- Country: Syria
- Governorate: Idlib
- District: Maarrat al-Nu'man District
- Subdistrict: Hish Nahiyah

Population (2004)
  - Total: 904
- Time zone: UTC+2 (EET)
  - Summer (DST): UTC+3 (EEST)
- City Qrya Pcode: C4106

Armanaya (Arabic: أرمنايا) is a Syrian village located in Hish Nahiyah in Maarrat al-Nu'man District, Idlib. According to the Syria Central Bureau of Statistics (CBS), Armanaya had a population of 904 in the 2004 census.
