= Qaratli =

Qaratli قراطي
- Village
- Location in Syria
- Coordinates: 35.584444°N 36.789722°E
- Country: Syria
- Governorate: Idlib
- District: Maarrat al-Nu'man District
- Subdistrict: Maarrat al-Nu'man Nahiyah

Population (2004)
  - Total: 567
- Time zone: UTC+2 (EET)
  - Summer (DST): UTC+3 (EEST)
- City Qrya Pcode: C3982

Qaratli (Arabic: قراطي) is a Syrian village located in Maarrat al-Nu'man Nahiyah in Maarrat al-Nu'man District, Idlib. According to the Syria Central Bureau of Statistics (CBS), Qaratli had a population of 567 in the 2004 census.
