= Mutawaseta =

Coordinates: 35.5914°N 36.9814°E

Mutawaseta المتوسطة
- Village
- Location in Syria
- Country: Syria
- Governorate: Idlib
- District: Maarrat al-Nu'man District
- Subdistrict: Sinjar Nahiyah

Population (2004)
  - Total: 616
- Time zone: UTC+2 (EET)
  - Summer (DST): UTC+3 (EEST)
- City Qrya Pcode: C4020

Mutawaseta (Arabic: المتوسطة) is a Syrian village located in Sinjar Nahiyah in Maarrat al-Nu'man District, Idlib. According to the Syria Central Bureau of Statistics (CBS), Mutawaseta had a population of 616 in the 2004 census.
