= Deir al-Gharbi =

Deir al-Gharbi دير الغربي
- Village
- Location in Syria
- Coordinates: 35°35′28″N 36°41′9″E
- Country: Syria
- Governorate: Idlib
- District: Maarrat al-Nu'man District
- Subdistrict: Maarrat al-Nu'man Nahiyah

Population (2004)
  - Total: 1,892
- Time zone: UTC+2 (EET)
  - Summer (DST): UTC+3 (EEST)
- City Qrya Pcode: C3968

Deir al-Gharbi (Arabic: دير الغربي) is a Syrian village located in Maarrat al-Nu'man Nahiyah in Maarrat al-Nu'man District, Idlib. According to the Syria Central Bureau of Statistics (CBS), Deir al-Gharbi had a population of 1892 in the 2004 census.
