= Sarja =

Sarja may refer to:

== Finland topics ==
- MTV Sarja, Finnish TV station
- SM-sarja, Finland's top-level ice hockey league from 1928 to 1975
- Suomi-sarja, Finland's third-highest ice hockey league

== Villages ==
in Syria

- Sarja, Syria
- Sarja Sharkiya
- Western Sarja

in Estonia

- Sarja, Estonia

== Indian surname ==
- Arjun Sarja (born 1962), Indian actor, producer and director
- Chiranjeevi Sarja (born 1984), Indian film actor
- Dhruva Sarja (born 1988), Indian film actor

== Other uses ==
- Sarja (film), a 1987 Marathi film
- Sarja (river), river of Latvia and Belarus
