= Amudiyeh =

Amudiyeh العامودية
- Village
- Location in Syria
- Coordinates: 35°33′11″N 36°39′58″E
- Country: Syria
- Governorate: Idlib
- District: Maarrat al-Nu'man District
- Subdistrict: Hish Nahiyah

Population (2004)
  - Total: 351
- Time zone: UTC+2 (EET)
  - Summer (DST): UTC+3 (EEST)
- City Qrya Pcode: C4101

Amudiyeh (Arabic: العامودية) is a Syrian village located in Hish Nahiyah in Maarrat al-Nu'man District, Idlib. According to the Syria Central Bureau of Statistics (CBS), Amudiyeh had a population of 351 in the 2004 census.
