= Banin =

Banin may refer to:

== People ==
- Tal Banin (born 1971), Israeli footballer
- Umm al-Banin (died 683), wife of Caliph Ali
- Umul Banin Ali, Pakistani politician
- Uri Banin, Israeli chemist and nanocrystal researcher

== Places ==
- Banín, municipality and village in Svitavy District in the Pardubice Region of the Czech Republic
- Banin, Idlib, a village in Syria

== See also ==
- Banine (1905–1992), French author
- Umm al-Banin bint Abd al-Aziz, wife of Umayyad caliph al-Walid I
