= Khayriyeh Saghira =

Khayriyeh Saghira خيرية صغيرة
- Village
- Location in Syria
- Country: Syria
- Governorate: Idlib
- District: Maarrat al-Nu'man District
- Subdistrict: Sinjar Nahiyah

Population (2004)
  - Total: 716
- Time zone: UTC+2 (EET)
  - Summer (DST): UTC+3 (EEST)
- City Qrya Pcode: C3994

Khayriyeh Saghira (Arabic: خيرية صغيرة) is a Syrian village located in Sinjar Nahiyah in Maarrat al-Nu'man District, Idlib. According to the Syria Central Bureau of Statistics (CBS), Khayriyeh Saghira had a population of 716 in the 2004 census.
