= Hazzan, Idlib =

Coordinates: 35°44′N 36°54′E

Hazzan, Idlib حزان
- Village
- Location in Syria
- Country: Syria
- Governorate: Idlib
- District: Maarrat al-Nu'man District
- Subdistrict: Maarrat al-Nu'man Nahiyah

Population (2004)
  - Total: 368
- Time zone: UTC+2 (EET)
  - Summer (DST): UTC+3 (EEST)
- City Qrya Pcode: C3960

Hazzan, Idlib (Arabic: حزان) is a Syrian village located in Maarrat al-Nu'man Nahiyah in Maarrat al-Nu'man District, Idlib. According to the Syria Central Bureau of Statistics (CBS), Hazzan, Idlib had a population of 368 in the 2004 census.
