= Karsaa =

Karsaa كرسعة
- Village
- Location in Syria
- Coordinates: 35°33′38.999″N 36°29′7.001″E
- Country: Syria
- Governorate: Idlib
- District: Maarrat al-Nu'man District
- Subdistrict: Kafr Nabl Nahiyah

Population (2004)
  - Total: 969
- Time zone: UTC+2 (EET)
  - Summer (DST): UTC+3 (EEST)
- City Qrya Pcode: C4073

Karsaa (Arabic: كرسعة) is a Syrian village located in Kafr Nabl Nahiyah in Maarrat al-Nu'man District, Idlib. According to the Syria Central Bureau of Statistics (CBS), Karsaa had a population of 969 in the 2004 census.

All of the village's residents were displaced during the Syrian civil war, either becoming IDPs within the Idlib Governorate or fleeing to Turkey. Since the conflict's end, 156 people have returned to the settlement (as of 8 May 2025).
