= Qoqfin =

Syrian villiage in southern Idlib, Syria

Qoqfin قوقفين
- Village
- Location in Syria
- Coordinates: 35°38′7″N 36°25′36″E
- Country: Syria
- Governorate: Idlib
- District: Maarrat al-Nu'man District
- Subdistrict: Kafr Nabl Nahiyah

Population (2004)
  - Total: 312
- Time zone: UTC+2 (EET)
  - Summer (DST): UTC+3 (EEST)
- City Qrya Pcode: C4064

Qoqfin (Arabic: قوقفين) is a Syrian village located in Kafr Nabl Nahiyah in Ma'arrat Nu'man District, Idlib. According to the Central Bureau of Statistics, Qoqfin had a population of 312 in the 2004 census.

== Syrian Civil War ==
On 21 October 2021, Qoqfin, along with numerous other towns in Jabal Zawiya, were shelled by Syrian Armed Forces, killing one individual and wounding others. Al-Fateh al Mubin responded by shelling military sites in Aleppo.

On 25 November 2023, 10 civilians, including seven children, a woman and two men, were killed by Syrian Army (SAA) artillery shelling on the village. The Syrian Observatory for Human Rights reported that the civilians were harvesting olives during the ground bombardment. Tahrir al-Sham, which has a military and political presence in the area, continued to clash with the SAA in the region.
