= Seraa =

Seraa صراع
- Village
- Location in Syria
- Coordinates: 35°34′15″N 37°3′0″E
- Country: Syria
- Governorate: Idlib
- District: Maarrat al-Nu'man District
- Subdistrict: Sinjar Nahiyah

Population (2004)
  - Total: 914
- Time zone: UTC+2 (EET)
  - Summer (DST): UTC+3 (EEST)
- City Qrya Pcode: C4022

Seraa (Arabic: صراع) is a Syrian village located in Sinjar Nahiyah in Maarrat al-Nu'man District, Idlib. According to the Syria Central Bureau of Statistics (CBS), Seraa had a population of 914 in the 2004 census.
