= Abu Habbeh =

Abu Habbeh ابو حبة
- Village
- Location in Syria
- Coordinates: 35°31′52″N 36°46′33″E
- Country: Syria
- Governorate: Idlib
- District: Maarrat al-Nu'man District
- Subdistrict: Hish Nahiyah

Population (2004)
  - Total: 517
- Time zone: UTC+2 (EET)
  - Summer (DST): UTC+3 (EEST)
- City Qrya Pcode: C4108

Abu Habbeh (Arabic: ابو حبة) is a Syrian village located in Hish Nahiyah in Maarrat al-Nu'man District, Idlib. According to the Syria Central Bureau of Statistics (CBS), Abu Habbeh had a population of 517 in the 2004 census.
