= Abu Sharji =

Coordinates: 35°35′N 36°53′E

Abu Sharji أبو شرجي
- Village
- Location in Syria
- Country: Syria
- Governorate: Idlib
- District: Maarrat al-Nu'man District
- Subdistrict: Sinjar Nahiyah

Population (2004)
  - Total: 507
- Time zone: UTC+2 (EET)
  - Summer (DST): UTC+3 (EEST)
- City Qrya Pcode: C4017

Abu Sharji (Arabic: أبو شرجي) is a Syrian village located in Sinjar Nahiyah in Maarrat al-Nu'man District, Idlib. According to the Syria Central Bureau of Statistics (CBS), Abu Sharji had a population of 507 in the 2004 census.
