= Khyara =

Coordinates: 35.6031°N 36.9608°E

Khyara خيارة
- Village
- Location in Syria
- Country: Syria
- Governorate: Idlib
- District: Maarrat al-Nu'man District
- Subdistrict: Sinjar Nahiyah

Population (2004)
  - Total: 673
- Time zone: UTC+2 (EET)
  - Summer (DST): UTC+3 (EEST)
- City Qrya Pcode: C4031

Khyara (Arabic: خيارة) is a Syrian village located in Sinjar Nahiyah in Maarrat al-Nu'man District, Idlib. According to the Syria Central Bureau of Statistics (CBS), Khyara had a population of 673 in the 2004 census.
