= Al-Hraki =

Coordinates: 35°39′N 36°51′E

Hraki الحراكي
- Village
- Location in Syria
- Country: Syria
- Governorate: Idlib
- District: Maarrat al-Nu'man District
- Subdistrict: Maarrat al-Nu'man Nahiyah

Population (2004)
  - Total: 1,467
- Time zone: UTC+2 (EET)
  - Summer (DST): UTC+3 (EEST)
- City Qrya Pcode: C3969

Hraki (Arabic: الحراكي) is a Syrian village located in Maarrat al-Nu'man Nahiyah in Maarrat al-Nu'man District, Idlib. According to the Syria Central Bureau of Statistics (CBS), Hraki had a population of 1467 in the 2004 census.
