= Fleifel =

Fleifel فليفل
- Village
- Location in Syria
- Country: Syria
- Governorate: Idlib
- District: Maarrat al-Nu'man District
- Subdistrict: Kafr Nabl Nahiyah
- Occupation: Jaish al-Fatah

Population (2004)
  - Total: 243
- Time zone: UTC+2 (EET)
  - Summer (DST): UTC+3 (EEST)
- City Qrya Pcode: C4069

Fleifel (Arabic: فليفل) is a Syrian village located in Kafr Nabl Nahiyah in Maarrat al-Nu'man District, Idlib. According to the Syria Central Bureau of Statistics (CBS), Fleifel had a population of 243 in the 2004 census.
