= Maar Tamater =

Maar Tamater معرتماتر
- Village
- Location in Syria
- Coordinates: 35°34′24″N 36°33′22″E
- Country: Syria
- Governorate: Idlib
- District: Maarrat al-Nu'man District
- Subdistrict: Kafr Nabl Nahiyah

Population (2004)
  - Total: 1,961
- Time zone: UTC+2 (EET)
  - Summer (DST): UTC+3 (EEST)
- City Qrya Pcode: C4065

Maar Tamater (Arabic: معرتماتر) is a Syrian village located in Kafr Nabl Nahiyah in Maarrat al-Nu'man District, Idlib. According to the Syria Central Bureau of Statistics (CBS), Maar Tamater had a population of 1,961 in the 2004 census.

== Syrian Civil War ==
On 28 May 2019, two people, a mother and child, were killed in an airstrike on the settlement.
