= Ftireh =

Coordinates: 35.6100°N 36.4856°E

Ftireh فطيرة
- Village
- Location in Syria
- Country: Syria
- Governorate: Idlib
- District: Maarrat al-Nu'man
- Subdistrict: Kafr Jabl
- Occupation: Jaish al-Fatah

Population (2004)
  - Total: 2,715
- Time zone: UTC+2 (EET)
  - Summer (DST): UTC+3 (EEST)
- City Qrya Pcode: C4070

Ftireh (Arabic: فطيرة) is a Syrian village located in Kafr Nabl Nahiyah in Maarrat al-Nu'man District, Idlib. According to the Syria Central Bureau of Statistics (CBS), Ftireh had a population of 2715 in the 2004 census.

== Syrian Civil War ==
On 16 June 2022, a fighter of Tahrir al-Sham was shot dead by forces of the Syrian Army on the frontline near the village.
