= Larry Moss =

Larry Moss may refer to:

- Larry Moss (artist) (born 1970), American artist who works mainly with latex balloons
- Larry Moss (acting coach), American actor and acting coach
- Larry Moss (24 character)
