= Mohammed al-Faisal =

Syrian journalist

- محمد الفيصل

Personal details
- Born: Hass, Idlib, Syria
- Occupation: Journalist, activist
- Nickname(s): Mohammed Faisal al-Akleh (Arabic: محمد فيصل العكلة)

Mohammed al-Faisal (Arabic: محمد الفيصل) is a Syrian journalist, media activist. He became recognized for his role in reporting during the Syrian civil war.

== Early life and education ==
Al-Faisal was born in the town of Hass in the southern countryside of Idlib Governorate, Syria. Raised in a rural setting, he completed his early education in Idlib. His upbringing in a region heavily impacted by the Syrian civil war helped shape his path of activism.

== Career ==
Al-Faisal began his career as a media activist at the onset of the Syrian civil war in 2011. He emerged as a key figure in documenting and reporting the events of the revolution, providing coverage of protests, battles, and humanitarian crises in northern Syria.

As a correspondent for Orient TV, al-Faisal reported on the conflict from the front lines. When Orient TV ceased operations in Syria,he transitioned to independent journalism.
