= Maar Shamarin =

Maar Shamarin معر شمارين
- Village
- Location in Syria
- Coordinates: 35°36′44″N 36°43′33″E
- Country: Syria
- Governorate: Idlib
- District: Maarrat al-Nu'man District
- Subdistrict: Maarrat al-Nu'man Nahiyah

Population (2004)
  - Total: 3,625
- Time zone: UTC+2 (EET)
  - Summer (DST): UTC+3 (EEST)
- City Qrya Pcode: C3983

Maar Shamarin (Arabic: معر شمارين) is a Syrian village located in Maarrat al-Nu'man Nahiyah in Maarrat al-Nu'man District, Idlib. According to the Syria Central Bureau of Statistics (CBS), Maar Shamarin had a population of 3,625 in the 2004 census.

== History ==
According to an Ottoman Defter record from 1526, the village of Maar Shamarin had a population of 20 households all of whom were Muslim.
