= Basqala =

Basqala بسقلا
- Village
- Location in Syria
- Coordinates: 35°36′N 36°35′E
- Country: Syria
- Governorate: Idlib
- District: Maarrat al-Nu'man District
- Subdistrict: Kafr Nabl Nahiyah
- Occupation: Jaish al-Fatah

Population (2004)
  - Total: 2,673
- Time zone: UTC+2 (EET)
  - Summer (DST): UTC+3 (EEST)
- City Qrya Pcode: C4061

Basqala (Arabic: بسقلا) is a Syrian village located in Kafr Nabl Nahiyah in Maarrat al-Nu'man District, Idlib. According to the Syria Central Bureau of Statistics (CBS), Basqala had a population of 2,673 in the 2004 census.

== Syrian Civil War ==
On 26 August 2019, six people were killed in the village by a Russian aistrike.
