= Milaja =

Milaja الملاجة
- Village
- Location in Syria
- Coordinates: 35°35′40″N 36°29′48″E
- Country: Syria
- Governorate: Idlib
- District: Maarrat al-Nu'man District
- Subdistrict: Kafr Nabl Nahiyah

Population (2004)
  - Total: 486
- Time zone: UTC+2 (EET)
  - Summer (DST): UTC+3 (EEST)
- City Qrya Pcode: C4060

Milaja (Arabic: الملاجة) is a Syrian village located in Kafr Nabl Nahiyah in Maarrat al-Nu'man District, Idlib. According to the Syria Central Bureau of Statistics (CBS), Milaja had a population of 486 in the 2004 census.

== Syrian civil war ==
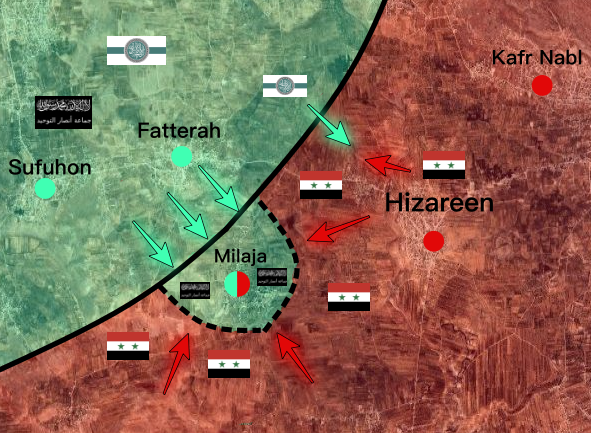
Analysis of the military situation on the Milaja frontline in Syria

On 26 August, fighters from Ansar al-Tawhid launched a large scale attack on Syrian Army forces in Milaja. The attack began with the detonation of a tunnel bomb and then a ground attack on the frontline. After violent clashes, Ansar al-Tawhid captured the village from SAA forces, killing 11 SAA soldiers and wounding over 20 others. The jihadists partially withdrew from the village amid Russian airstrikes on opposition supply lines. At least two jihadists were killed. This attack was the first time the Idlib frontline had changed since March 2020.
