= Hish, Syria =

Hish حِيش
- Town
- Location in Syria
- Coordinates: 35°32′47″N 36°38′35″E
- Country: Syria
- Governorate: Idlib
- District: Maarrat al-Nu'man
- Subdistrict: Hish

Population (2004)
  - Total: 8,817
- Time zone: UTC+2 (EET)
  - Summer (DST): UTC+3 (EEST)

Hish (Arabic: حِيش, romanized: Ḥīš, also spelled Heish or Heesh) is a town in northwestern Syria, administratively part of the Ma'arrat al-Numan District of the Idlib Governorate. According to the Syria Central Bureau of Statistics, Hish had a population of 8,817 in the 2004 census. It is the administrative center of the Hish Subdistrict, which contained 18 localities with a combined population of 41,231 in 2004. Its inhabitants are predominantly Sunni Muslims.

Nearby localities include Kafr Nabl, Hass, Kafr Ruma and Maarrat al-Numan to the north, Babulin and al-Tah to the east, Kafr Sajnah to the west and Khan Shaykhun to the south. Hish was a small hamlet in the 1960s.

== Bibliography ==
- Boulanger, Robert (1966). The Middle East, Lebanon, Syria, Jordan, Iraq, Iran. Hachette.
