= Al-Tah, Idlib =

Al-Tah, Idlib التح
- Town
- Location in Syria
- Coordinates: 35°32′26″N 36°43′44″E
- Country: Syria
- Governorate: Idlib
- District: Maarrat al-Nu'man District
- Subdistrict: Hish Nahiyah

Population (2004)
  - Total: 8,606
- Time zone: UTC+2 (EET)
  - Summer (DST): UTC+3 (EEST)
- City Qrya Pcode: C4099

Al-Tah, Idlib (Arabic: التح) is a Syrian town located in Hish Nahiyah within the Maarrat al-Nu'man District, Idlib. According to the Syria Central Bureau of Statistics (CBS), Al-Tah, Idlib had a population of 8,606 in the 2004 census.
