= Maar Shurin =

Maar Shurin معرشورين Maarshurin
- Village
- Location in Syria
- Coordinates: 35°40′0″N 36°43′28″E
- Country: Syria
- Governorate: Idlib
- District: Maarrat al-Nu'man
- Subdistrict: Maarrat al-Nu'man

Population (2004)
  - Total: 7,487
- Time zone: UTC+2 (EET)
  - Summer (DST): UTC+3 (EEST)

Maar Shurin (Arabic: معرشورين, also spelled Maarshurin) is a village in northwestern Syria, administratively part of the Maarrat al-Nu'man District of the Idlib Governorate. According to the Syria Central Bureau of Statistics, Maar Shurin had a population of 7,487 in the 2004 census. Its inhabitants are predominantly Sunni Muslims. Nearby localities include Maarrat al-Nu'man to the west, Babila to the north, al-Ghadqah to the east, and Maar Shamshah and Talmenes to the south.

== Bibliography ==
- Boulanger, Robert (1966). The Middle East, Lebanon, Syria, Jordan, Iraq, Iran. Hachette.
