= Ralph Dewey =

American balloon twister (born 1944)

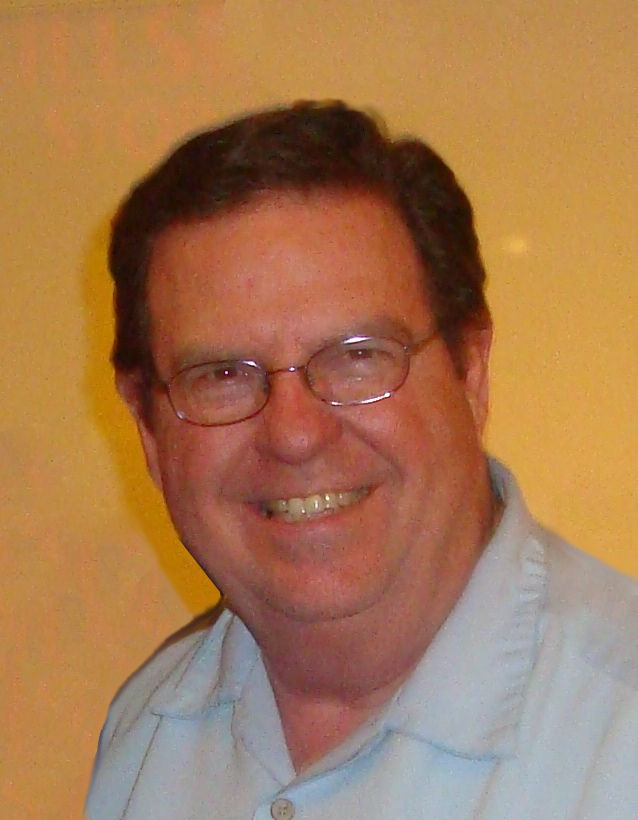
- Ralph Dewey
- Born: August 8, 1944 (age 81)
- Known for: Sculpture, Performance, Balloon modelling

Ralph Dewey (born August 8, 1944), also known as Dewdrop the Clown, is an American balloon twister and clown who is known as the "grandfather of all twisters". He started twisting balloons in 1975, and in 1976 published a book, Dewey's New Balloon Animals. Since then, he has published 30 books (16 on the subject of balloon twisting), numerous videos and DVDs, and dozens of magazine articles.

== Balloon art and clowning ==
Dewey helped found several organizations: Joey to the World, a gospel clown convention; DewJam Balloon Convention; and Kingdom Twisters. Joey to the World is one of the largest and oldest Gospel Clowning Conventions in the world, first staged in 1994 and held in Houston, Texas. In 2003, he started presenting the Ralph Dewey Balloon Excellence Award, which has now become one of the highest honors in balloon-twisting. Dewey is a staff writer for The Cross and the Clown magazine.

David Grist, a pioneer in the balloon-twisting craft, died in 2005 after suffering a heart attack shortly before the annual Twist & Shout Convention. In honor of Grist's contributions to the field, the organizers of Twist & Shout, the biggest balloon twisting convention, instituted the "David Grist Memorial Award", the first award going to Ralph Dewey due to his contributions to the field of balloon twisting.

== Personal life ==
Dewey served in the US Air Force before joining Shell Chemicals as a non-degree engineer. He taught instrumentation at San Jacinto College in Houston, Texas, where he wrote several reference and training handbooks on instrumentation.

== Awards ==
- Fellowship of Christian Magicians: 5-time recipient of the "Best Balloon Lecture"
- 2004 Millennium Jam he was awarded the "Lifetime of Caring" award"
- 2005 Diamond Jam - received a plaque celebrating "30 Years of Service to the Balloon Twisting industry"
- 2005 David Grist Memorial Award
