= Henry Maar =

American balloon twister (1921–1992)

Henry J. Maar
- Born: 1921
- Died: 1992 (aged 70–71)
- Known for: Balloon Twisting

Henry J. Maar (1921–1992), known as "The Sultan of Balloons", was one of the pioneers in balloon twisting. He appeared for over a decade on episodes of the long running Bozo's Circus. While the origins of balloon twisting are impossible to prove, Emmy Award winning producer/director Joseph Maar has provided evidence that his father, Henry, may be the founder of balloon twisting. Larry Moss calls Joseph Maar's evidence "compelling" but warns that if Joseph Maar is correct then the history of balloon twisting would have to be rewritten. For example, the 1975 book by "Jolly the Clown" Petri credits "Herman Bonnert from Pennsylvania at a magician's convention in 1939" as being the first balloontwister.

== Joseph Maar's account ==
Joseph Maar is the three time Emmy Award Winning Coordinating Director formerly with ESPN who worked on shows including Sports Center, Sports Century, Pardon the Interruption, and Around the Horn. He is also a client of some of the largest ballooning stores in the country. His story of his father has been picked up by several sources as the story of the origins of Balloon Twisting.

According to Joseph Maar, his father had pleurisy as a child and spent several years at a TB Sanitorium in Milwaukee. To develop his lungs, the facility had Henry blow up balloons. In the 1930s Henry became a vaudeville magician. While preparing for a show in 1938 or 1939, Joseph writes, "he came back to the car to get the rest of his magic tricks only to find the vehicle had been broken into and everything was gone." With his magic tricks stolen, Maar went on stage and performed a show consisting primarily of balloon twisting. "Afterward, the agents went nuts and told him to forget the magic and to start doing the balloons. That [Henry Maar's agents said]'everyone's doing regular magic tricks but no one is doing the balloon tricks.'"

Henry spent the next ten years performing under the stage name of "Johnny Ford" and entertaining GIs with the USO. After World War II an agent offered Maar twice his rate to wear a clown suit while performing his act. From the late 50s to mid-70s, Joseph and a 1968 article from the Waukegan Sun-Times cites that his father was a regular on Bozo's Circus and other children's shows. Two of these episodes reside with BalloonHQ and in IMDb he is listed in the credits of the March 16, 1977 episode of Bozo's Circus.

Joseph Maar also credits his father with inventing 'face painting.' According to Joseph, his father would sometimes have trouble with his makeup during long summertime events. To cover his own need to touch up his clown make up, he would invite kids up on stage where Henry Maar would "make them up" like a clown.

== Other origin stories ==
While Joseph Maar's story has been accepted as "compelling," it is not viewed as conclusive. Other twisters have been credited with being the originator of balloon twisting. They include:

- Val Andrews, in Manual of Balloon Modeling, Vol. 1, An Encyclopedic Series, credits H.J. Bonnert of Scranton, PA as being the "daddy of them all."
- John Shirley, in the preface to One balloon animals; the rubber jungle / Roger's rubber jungle by Roger Siegel, writes "probably began sometime around 1920 but did not become popular until the advent of the skinny balloons after World War II...The inventor of the one balloon animal is unknown, but his origination opened the door to a new art."
- Jim Church III writes, " Frank Zacone from Youngstown, Ohio was doing a balloon act during the 1940s and had been doing the act for some time."
