= Maar (surname) =

Maar is a surname. Notable people with the surname include:

- Andy Maar (born 1983), Luxembourgish politician
- Anne Maar (born 1965), German children's author and theatre director
- Dora Maar (1907–1997), French photographer, painter, and poet
- Henry Maar (1921–1992), a pioneer in balloon twisting
- Marc de Maar (born 1984), Curaçaoan road racing cyclist
- Michael Maar (born 1960), German literary scholar, Germanist, and author
- Paul Maar (born 1937), German novelist, playwright, translator, and illustrator
- Pons Maar (born 1951), American actor, puppeteer, artist and filmmaker
- Stephen Maar (born 1994), Canadian volleyball player
