= Maar Shamshah =

Maar Shamshah معر شمشه Maarshmisha
- Village
- Location in Syria
- Coordinates: 35°38′7″N 36°42′38″E
- Country: Syria
- Governorate: Idlib
- District: Maarrat al-Nu'man
- Subdistrict: Maarrat al-Nu'man

Population (2004)
  - Total: 3,268
- Time zone: UTC+2 (EET)
  - Summer (DST): UTC+3 (EEST)

Maar Shamshah (Arabic: معر شمشه, also spelled Maarshmisha) is a village administratively belonging to the Idlib Governorate in northwestern Syria. Nearby localities include the mantiqah ("district") center of Maarrat al-Nu'man to the west, Maar Shurin to the north, Talmenes to the east, Maar Shamrin and Deir Sharqi to the southeast and Deir Gharbi to the south. According to the Syria Central Bureau of Statistics, Maar Shamshah had a population of 3,268 in the 2004 census.

During the ongoing Syrian Civil War between the government of Bashar al-Assad and opposition activists and rebels, Maar Shamshah has been described as a "pro-rebel" village by the Syrian Observatory for Human Rights, an activist organization. The Observatory reported that the village was bombarded by the Syrian Army on 31 October 2012. The Observatory later reported that Maar Shamshah was shelled by the Syrian Army on 11 November.
