= Kafr Rumah =

Kafr Rumah كفر ومة Kafrumah Kfar Ruma
- Village
- Location in Syria
- Coordinates: 35°38′3″N 36°37′56″E
- Country: Syria
- Governorate: Idlib
- District: Maarrat al-Nu'man
- Subdistrict: Maarrat al-Nu'man

Population (2004)
  - Total: 12,276
- Time zone: UTC+2 (EET)
  - Summer (DST): UTC+3 (EEST)

Kafr Rumah (Arabic: كفر ومة, also spelled Kafrumah or Kfar Ruma) is a town in northwestern Syria, administratively part of the Maarrat al-Nu'man District of the Idlib Governorate. According to the Syria Central Bureau of Statistics, Kafr Rumah had a population of 12,276 in the 2004 census. Its inhabitants are predominantly Sunni Muslims. Nearby localities include Hass, Syria and Kafr Nabl to the west, Sarjah to the north, Maarrat al-Nu'man to the east and Hish to the south.

== History ==
Kafr Rumah contains ancient ruins. Among them is a bridge consisting of slabs built on ten pillars instead of the typical style of Roman and Byzantine-era bridges in the Levant and elsewhere, which are supported by arches.

According to the 13th century Muslim scholar Yaqut al-Hamawi, Kafar Ruma was:

"A village of Ma'arrah an Nu'man. It was once a celebrated fortress, but was ruined by Lulu as Saifi, who conquered Halab in 393 (1003)".

In 1526, a decade after the Ottoman conquest of Syria, the village had a recorded population of 132 households and 26 bachelors. It was the largest village within the Maarrat al-Nu'man nahiya.

== Bibliography ==
- Boulanger, Robert (1966). The Middle East, Lebanon, Syria, Jordan, Iraq, Iran. Hachette.
- Le Strange, G. (1890). Palestine Under the Moslems: A Description of Syria and the Holy Land from A.D. 650 to 1500. Committee of the Palestine Exploration Fund.
