= Hass, Syria =

Hass حَاسٌّ
- Town
- Location in Syria
- Coordinates: 35°37′1″N 36°35′43″E
- Country: Syria
- Governorate: Idlib
- District: Maarrat al-Nu'man
- Subdistrict: Kafr Nabl
- Elevation: 630 m (2,070 ft)

Population (2004)
  - Total: 9,595
- Time zone: UTC+2 (EET)
  - Summer (DST): UTC+3 (EEST)

Hass (Arabic: حَاسٌّ, romanized: Ḥāss) is a town in northwestern Syria, administratively part of the Ma'arrat al-Numan District of the Idlib Governorate. The town has an altitude of 630 meters above sea level. According to the Syria Central Bureau of Statistics, Hass had a population of 9,595 in the 2004 census. Its inhabitants are predominantly Sunni Muslims.

Nearby localities include Kafr Nabl to the west, Hish to the south, Kafr Ruma and Maarrat al-Numan to the east, and al-Bara to the north. Hass is well known for its olive groves, and is surrounded by historical sites, including some of the most important Dead Cities, such as Serjilla, Shanshrah, and al-Bara and Kafr Nabl.

== Archaeology ==
Hass itself contains a medieval-era mosque and ruins. It is also immediately northwest of the site of a 6th-century CE Byzantine tomb. The tomb consists of two levels with a pyramid-shaped roof and is held up by Corinthian columns.

Hass is also near the site of an ancient dead city, known today as Khirbet Hass. The site contains the scattered ruins of six Roman and Byzantine-era churches and a large municipal hall with a rectangular courtyard with borders made of Doric columns. Among the churches, is one that measured 65 ft by 43.5 ft (its nave making up nearly half of the width). The church floor was marked by a mosaic depicting peacocks.

== Bibliography ==
- Boulanger, Robert (1966). The Middle East, Lebanon, Syria, Jordan, Iraq, Iran. Hachette.
