= Uri Banin =

Israeli physical chemist

- אורי בנין
- Born: Rehovot, Israel
- Education: Hebrew University of Jerusalem; University of California, Berkeley
- Known for: Hybrid metal-semiconductor nanocrystals Photocatalysis Doping of semiconductor nanocrystals
- Scientific career
- Academic advisors: Sanford Ruhman; Paul Alivisatos
- Website: https://openscholar.huji.ac.il/baningroup/ http://chem.ch.huji.ac.il/~nano/

Uri Banin (Hebrew: אורי בנין) is an Israeli nanotechnologist and physical chemist and a professor at the Hebrew University of Jerusalem, currently holding the Alfred & Erica Larisch Memorial Chair at the Institute of Chemistry. He is recognized as one of the pioneers of nanoscience in Israel.

== Education ==
Following his military service, in 1986 Banin proceeded on to his academic career, receiving his Bachelor of Science degree in chemistry and physics from the Hebrew University of Jerusalem in 1989. He later received PhD from the Hebrew University, under the supervision of Sanford Ruhman in the field of femtosecond spectroscopy, studying the ultrafast dynamics of triiodide in solution.

== Scientific career ==
In 1994 Banin joined the group of Paul Alivisatos in UC Berkeley as a postdoctoral researcher, studying the physical chemistry of semiconductor nanocrystals. In 1997 he joined the Institute of Chemistry at the Hebrew University of Jerusalem as a senior lecturer, becoming a full professor in 2004.

In the early days of his independent career at the Hebrew University, Banin used tunneling spectroscopy techniques in order to study the electronic properties of semiconductor nanocrystals, ultimately reporting the identification of atomic-like electronic states in 1999 in Nature. His later work has diverged in the directions of both synthesis of novel semiconductor-based nanomaterials, the physical characterization of such nanostructures, as well as various applications. In 2003 his group has reported the first successful growth of colloidal zinc-blende lattice III-V semiconductor nanorods. Continuing the work on III-V semiconductor nanocrystals, the group has published the synthesis of bright near-infrared-emitting core/shell nanocrystals, later employing them in a novel nanocrystal-polymer near-infrared light-emitting diode. In 2011 the group reported a simple procedure for the doping on nanocrystals, allowing the synthesis of heavily-doped p-type and n-type semiconductor nanocrystals.

Some of his earlier works include the study of cadmium chalcogenide molecular clusters as a step between complexes and nanocrystals with semiconducting properties. Setting this work aside since 2002, his next paper on the subject was only in 2017 reporting magic sized InP and InAs clusters. Subsequent work on related clusters with the groups of Richard D. Robinson and Tobias Hanrath has finally lead to the discovery of the reversible isomerization of inorganic clusters – a discovery made by chance during the shipping of the samples. This work was called "the final bridge" between molecules and nanocrystals.

One of the most recognized contribution of Banin to the field of colloidal nanostructures is the first demonstration of selective metal growth on semiconductor nanocrystals, resembling well-known bulk systems such as the Schottky diode, and the subsequent refinement of related synthesis procedures and the discovery of similar structures, as well as the physical characterization of such systems. To this day, hybrid metal-semiconductor nanostructures are state-of-the-art systems in the field of photocatalysis. One of the breakthroughs made by Banin's lab, employing hybrid metal-semiconductor nanocrystals in water-based 3D printing and photopolymerization of common acrylates. It was also later shown that such approach can also be used for solvent-free photopolymerization and microprinting.

Banin is widely recognized as a pioneer of nanoscience in Israel, founding the Harvey M. Kreuger Family Center for Nanoscience and Nanotechnology in 2001 and serving as its first director for nearly a decade until 2010. He was the chairman of the scientific committee and a co-chairperson of the first international nanoscience conference in Israel in 2009, now an internationally-recognized biennial conference.

In 2009, Banin became the scientific founder of Qlight Nanotech, which was later fully acquired by Merck KGaA for an undisclosed price and is currently located in the campus of the Hebrew University in Givat Ram. In 2019 Nanosys signed an exclusive agreement on quantum dot patents developed in Banin's lab and held by Yissum.

Banin has been an associate editor of the American Chemical Society journal Nano Letters between 2013-2021. In 2020 he joined the Advisory Board of Nanoscale Horizons, a journal published by the Royal Society of Chemistry.

As of 2022, Banin has authored more than 210 papers that have been widely cited. In addition, he has invented more than 35 different patents.

== Awards and major grants ==
- Miller Visiting Professorship, 2019
- Israel Chemical Society Prize of Excellence, 2018
- Kolthoff Award from Technion Israel Institute of Technology, 2017
- ERC Advanced Investigator Grant, 2017–2022
- IVS Excellence Award for Research, 2017
- Landau prize by Mifal Hapais (in the field of Applied Nanotechnology), 2015
- Kaye Innovation Award, 2015
- Israel Chemical Society Prize in memory of Lea Tenne for Nanoscale Sciences, 2013
- ERC Advanced Investigator Grant, 2010–2015
- Klachky Award, 2008
- Michael Bruno Memorial Award, 2007–2010
- Hebrew University Rector Prize for excellence in research, 2006
- Willstätter Lectureship, 2006
- Kaye Innovation Award, 2005
- [Israel Chemical Society Award for Young Chemist, 2001
- The Hebrew University President Young Investigator Award, named after Prof. Yoram Ben-Porat, 2000
- Yigal Alon Fellowship for Young Faculty, 1997–2000
- Award of the Ulshwang fund, for research program of the Israel Science foundation, 1998
- Bergmann grant for young recipients of the B.S.F research grants, 1997
- Fulbright postdoctoral fellowship, 1994–1996
- Rothschild postdoctoral fellowship, 1994–1995

== Notable alumni ==
Numerous former students and postdoctoral researchers of Banin are faculty members of Israeli and other universities.

- Taleb Mokari, Ben-Gurion University of the Negev.
- Yuval Ebenstein, Tel-Aviv University.
- Guohua Jia, Curtin University.
- Janet E. Macdonald, Vanderbilt University.
- Dan Oron, Weizmann Institute of Science.
- Eli Rothenberg, New York University.
- Amit Sitt, Tel-Aviv University.
- Yehonadav Bekenstein, Technion – Israel Institute of Technology.
- Botao Ji, Westlake University, Zhezheng, China.
- Hadar Steinberg, Hebrew University of Jerusalem.
- Y. Charles Cao, University of Florida.
- Ido Hadar, Hebrew University of Jerusalem.
- Dirk Dorfs, Leibniz University Hannover.
- Jiajia Ning, Jilin University, Changchun, China.
