= Larry Moss (artist) =

American artist, writer and educator (born 1970)

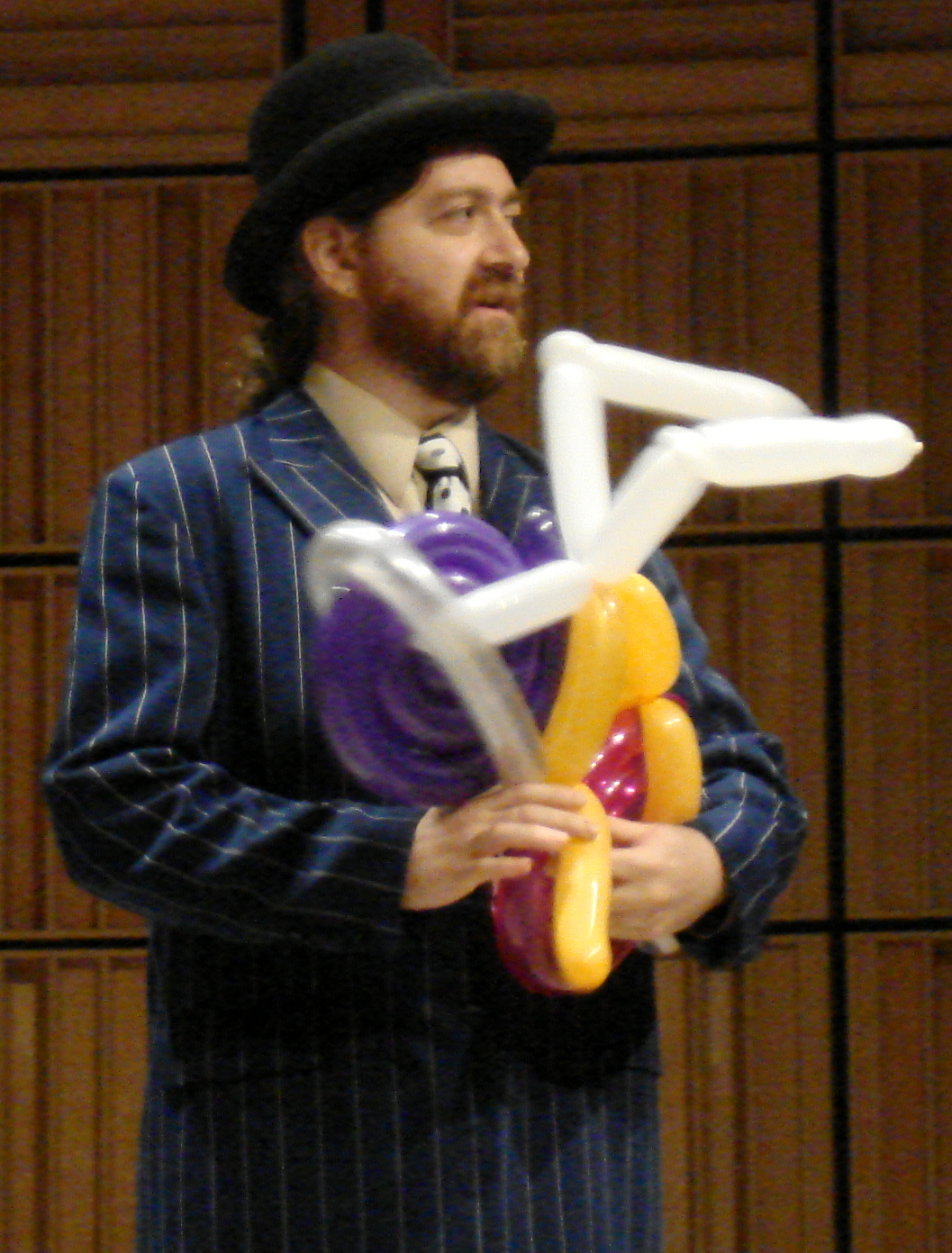
- Larry Moss - American artist, author and educator
- Born: September 25, 1970 (age 55); New York City, United States
- Known for: Sculpture, Performance
- Notable work: Fantastic Flying Octopus (2003); Balloon Manor (2004, 2006-2008, 2013-2014) "LEGO Biggiefig at London Brick" (2014)

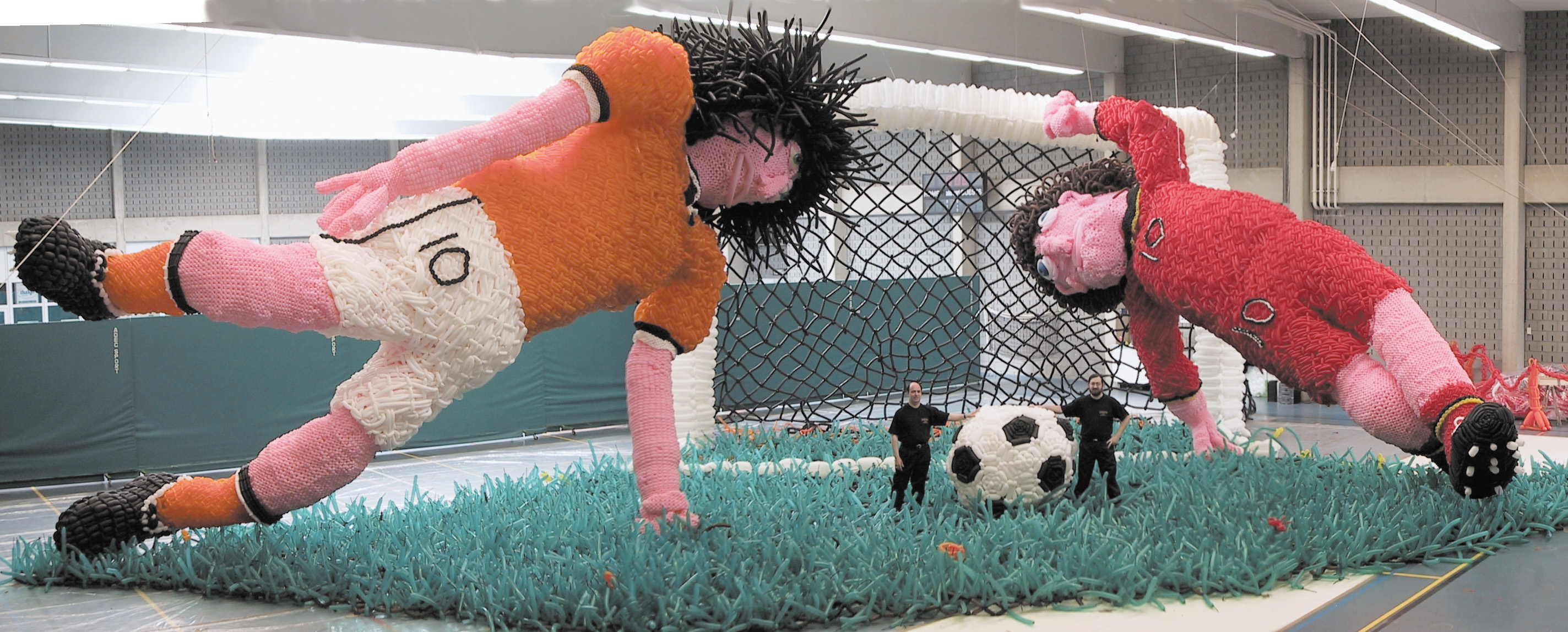
Soccer Players - An example of work by the artist

Lawrence "Larry" Charles Moss (born September 25, 1970) is an American artist, writer and educator who works mainly with latex balloons. He is known, in the field of large-scale balloon sculpture as art installation, for creating technically and aesthetically challenging sculptures which often incorporate literary, art and pop culture references.

In March 2015, The Washington Post ran a profile on Moss which identified him as "the best balloon artist in the world."

Moss has conceived, organized and constructed large-scale balloon installations in North America, South America, Europe and Asia, including: the world's first piloted flying balloon sculpture, Balloon Manor (a large-scale haunted house made entirely from balloons) and the world's largest, non-round balloon sculpture (see "Soccer Players"). The latter earned Moss and fellow artist Royal Sorell a Guinness World Record and was featured on an episode of the Ripley's Believe It Or Not! TV series.

Moss recently set a second world record at London's Brick 2014 event, erecting a 20-foot-tall balloon replica of a LEGO minifigure that has been recognized in Guinness World Records 2016. Moss is also the founder of one of the first 50, non-academic websites established on the internet: BalloonHQ.com, an online community and resource for amateur and professional balloon artists. He currently owns and operates Airigami, LLC, with his wife and business partner, Designer Kelly Cheatle.

== Early life and education ==
Moss grew up in Queens, NY, and studied music at Fiorello H. LaGuardia High School (as featured in the movie “Fame”). Moss graduated from the University of Rochester with an undergraduate degree in Applied Mathematics/Computer Science and a master's degree in Elementary Education and has worked as a programmer.

== Major works ==
=== Balloon HQ ===
In 1992, Moss started an email discussion list for balloon twisters. In 1994, those listings were archived online and visual content was added, marking the official launch of BalloonHQ.com. As internet usage exploded in the late 1990s, nearly every serious balloon artist joined the BalloonHQ Community. This prompted Moss, its founder, to partner with Sheena Beaverson and Mark Balzer, who helped administer the site. Site discussions led to the first balloon twisting convention (T-Jam 1999), the first international balloon art photo contest and the free dissemination of balloon art ideas and designs. Today, in addition to sustaining an important industry dialogue, BalloonHQ calls attention to key industry events and provides members with access to customizable portfolios and specialized educational materials. On an annual basis, Moss communicates with and advises an estimated 500,000 site visitors.

=== World Record ===
In 2000, Moss and Sorell were commissioned to create a world-record-sized balloon sculpture in Moi, Belgium. They designed and depicted a scene showing two soccer players kicking a ball into a goal. At the time, the sculpture was the largest non-round balloon sculpture in the world. It was constructed of more than 40,750 inflated latex balloons. The installation was built without framing, line or glue and relied only on traditional balloon twisting methods. Forty-two additional crew members and more than 640 man-hours were required to construct the sculptural piece, which stood 25 feet (7.6 m) tall and was roughly 80 feet (24 m) wide. Each of the latex soccer players stood an unprecedented 40 feet (12 m) tall.

=== World’s First Piloted Balloon Sculpture ===
In July 2003, Moss orchestrated the creation of the “Fantastic Flying Octopus” - an impressive, air-bound balloon sculpture that was piloted by John Ninomiya. A 23-member balloon artist team, an eight-member flight crew and hundreds of community members helped build and launch the first-ever, piloted, latex balloon sculpture (which took five days and 700 man hours to complete). Nearly 20,000 twisting balloons were assembled by artists from around the U.S. and Canada to create the "Fantastic Flying Octopus," with several thousands of people showing up to observe construction and the eventual launch of the cluster balloon craft, in Sodus Bay, NY. It was powered solely by wind and 10,000 cubic feet (280 m^{3}) of helium.

=== Balloon Manor ===
Beginning in 2004, Moss shifted his focus to "Balloon Manor" – a haunted house made entirely of latex balloons. Moss organized and led a design team of professional balloon artists and community volunteers to build, promote and run the functional, Halloween-themed balloon installation. Each life-sized structure required more than 100,000 balloons and 50 crew members to build. "Balloon Manor" attracted 10,000-plus visitors annually through 2008 before being put on hold.

On November 10, 2013, Moss and Cheatle completed a successful Kickstarter campaign to fund a revival of the popular "Balloon Manor" concept. The first subsequent installation, "The VERY Tall Tale of Jack & His Beanstalk," was a latex adaptation of the English fairy tale "Jack and the Beanstalk" (aka "Jack the Giant Slayer"). Built in the historic Sibley Building in downtown Rochester, NY, between February 1 and 4, 2014, it featured a five-story beanstalk topped by a castle that appeared to be floating on balloon clouds.

=== Airigami, LLC ===
In 2005, Moss launched Airigami, LLC, through which he conceives and constructs creative content made entirely of balloons. Projects range from life-sized, individual sculptures to record-breaking, on-site installations for use at national and international museums (i.e., The Strong National Museum of Play, Virginia Museum of Natural History, Rochester Museum and Science Center), art galleries (i.e., Phelps Arts Center), trade shows and more.

Several large-scale creations conceived, designed and produced by Airigami have appeared in promotional videos, award-winning illustrations, animation formats and TV programs. The company's air-filled recreations of master works like “Girl with a Pearl Earring” by Johannes Vermeerr, “American Gothic” by Grant Wood and Sandro Botticelli's “The Birth of Venus” have helped distinguish Moss and Cheatle as masters in their own right.

== Other appearances ==
Moss and Cheatle were both featured on the December 24, 2013, "Pop, the Tragic Dragon" episode of the A&E reality TV series "Shipping Wars." The show documented the over-the-road, bubble-wrapped transport of a 20 ft. wide, 10-foot-high dragon made entirely of artfully-bended latex balloons, by Moss and Cheatle, for the Brooklyn Children's Museum in Brooklyn, NY. Its shipment, from Upstate N.Y., was overseen by Christopher Hanna and Robbie Welsh, representing the Strong Museum of Play. The show's crew successfully delivered the dragon sculpture, with minimal damage, under Moss and Cheatle's direction.

== Educator ==
Larry Moss is a popular industry educator. He has taught balloon art in Europe, Asia, and America. He is also the author of several books and has designed balloon kits which are popular among children and adults worldwide.

== Publications ==
- BalloonHQ.com (website, 1992 to present) - The largest balloon art resource on the Internet, BalloonHQ provides an estimated 25,000 weekly visitors with information, advice and resources.
- Twisting History: Lessons in Balloon Sculpting (paperback, 1995 - Parma Publishing)
- Attack of the 50-foot (15 m) Demon: Large Scale Balloon Art and Other Advanced Balloon Twisting Techniques (CD-ROM, 1999 - Fooled Ya Productions)
- Balloonicature: The Many Faces of Balloon Art (CD-ROM, 2000 - Parma Publishing)
- Flying an Octopus: Raising Balloon Art to New Heights (DVD, 2003 - Tim Beyer Productions)
- Balloon Architecture (paperback and kit, 2007 - Metro Books)
- Climb Inside (paperback, 2007 - Perfect Paperback)
- Balloon Engineering: Build 10 of the Coolest Places in the World (paperback, 2009 - Metro Books)

== See also ==
- Balloon modelling
