= Balloon modelling =

Shaping of special modelling balloons

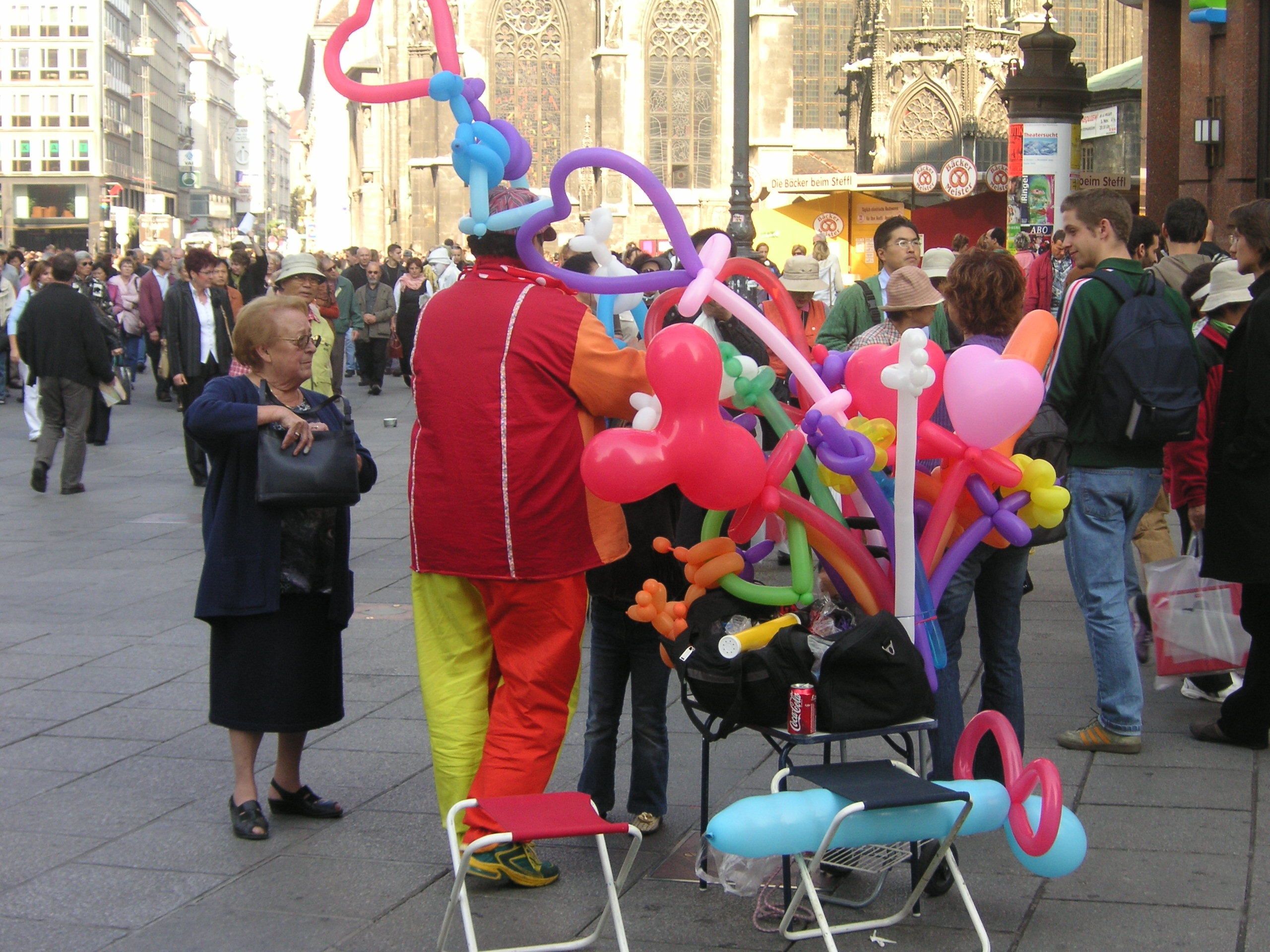
A balloon artist in Vienna, Austria

A street performer doing balloon modelling in Japan, 2022

Balloon modelling or balloon twisting is the shaping of special modelling balloons into various shapes, often balloon animals. People who create balloon animals and other twisted balloon decoration sculptures are called twisters, balloon benders, and balloon artists. Twisters often perform in restaurants, at birthday parties, fairs and at public and private events or functions.

Two primary design styles are "single balloon modelling", which restricts itself to the use of one balloon per model, and "multiple balloon modelling", which uses more than one balloon. Each style has its own set of challenges and skills, and most twisters practise both styles. Depending on the needs of the moment, they might easily move between the one-balloon or multiple approaches, or they might even incorporate additional techniques such as "weaving" and "stuffing". Modelling techniques have evolved to include a range of very complex moves, and a highly specialized vocabulary has emerged to describe the techniques involved and their resulting creations.

Some twisters inflate their balloons with their own lungs, and for many years this was a standard and necessary part of the act. However, many now use a pump of some sort, whether it is a hand pump, an electric pump plugged in or run by a battery pack, or a compressed gas tank containing air or nitrogen. Twisters do not generally fill their creations with helium, as these designs will not usually float anyway. The balloons for twisting are too porous for helium and the designs are generally too heavy for their size for helium to lift.

== Origins ==
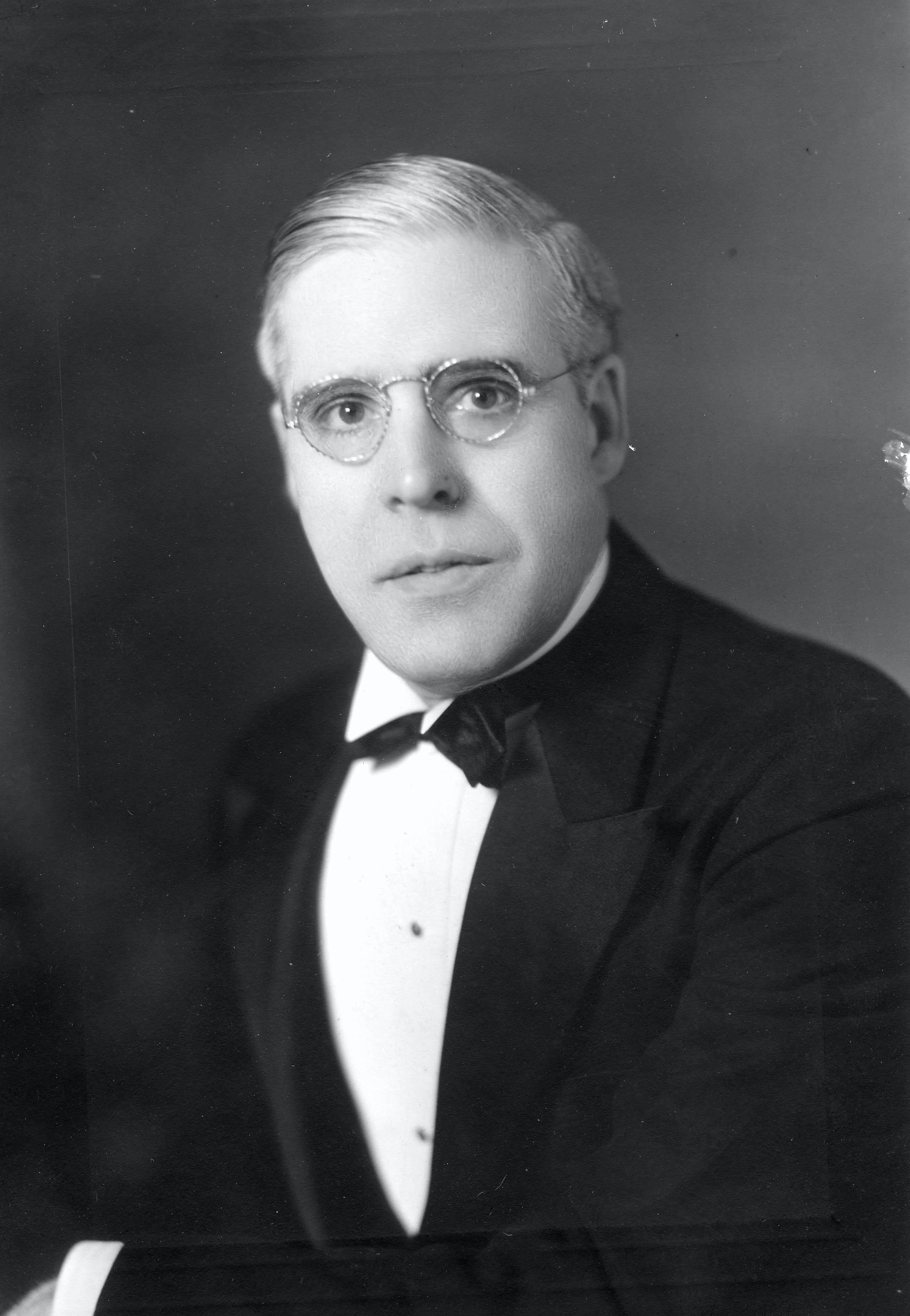
A photo of Herman J. Bonnert from the early 1930's at a magic convention in Pittsburgh, PA. He is frequently credited as the inventor of balloon modelling; the complete photo has a detailed border drawing of balloon animals and other balloon art.

The origins of balloon modelling are unknown. The 1975 book by "Jolly the Clown" Art Petri credits "Herman Bonnert from Pennsylvania at a magician's convention in 1939" as being the first balloon twister. Val Andrews, in Manual of Balloon Modeling, Vol. 1, An Encyclopedic Series, credits H.J. Bonnert of Scranton, Pennsylvania as being the "daddy of them all". Jim Church III states, "Frank Zacone from Youngstown, Ohio was doing a balloon act during the 1940s and had been doing the act for some time." Another candidate for first balloon twister is Henry Maar.

Regardless of who was first, early balloon modelling was heavily constrained by the chemical limitations of early 20th-century rubber, which was highly fragile and prone to popping when twisted. The medium experienced a significant paradigm shift following the Tillotson Rubber Company's 1931 development of mass-produced latex balloons derived from natural rubber tree sap. This manufacturing breakthrough allowed for the creation of longer, highly durable "pencil balloons" that could withstand intense manipulation and complex knotting. Consequently, during the 1940s and 1950s, the practice rapidly evolved from a niche novelty act at magic conventions into a mainstream staple of circus, vaudeville, and clown entertainment.

== Equipment ==
A balloon modeller's toolkit contains hundreds of colourful balloons in various sizes and hues.

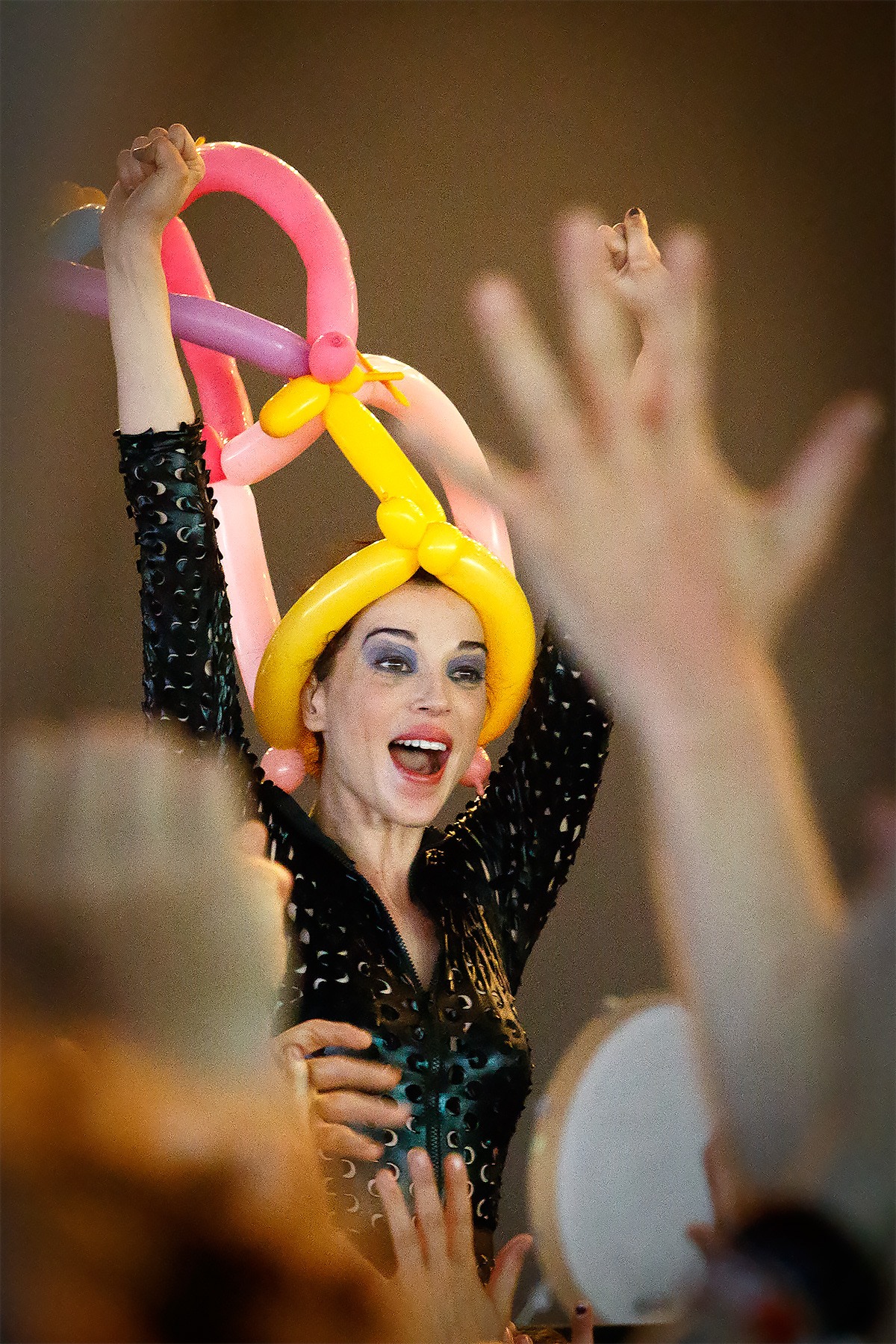
Musician St. Vincent wearing a balloon hat in 2015

Modellers will use an assortment of balloons, usually in various colours. Balloon sizes are usually identified by a number: the most common size of twisting balloons is called a "260", as it is approximately two inches in diameter and 60 inches long. Thus, a "260" is 2×60 inches and a "160" is 1×60 inches when fully blown up. Although these are the most common sizes used, there are dozens of other shapes available as well.

The most common methods for inflation are air pumps similar to bicycle pumps, electric air compressors, and the mouth. Inflating a balloon with the mouth is difficult and can be dangerous. Some twisters, however, can blow up several balloons at once, and some can blow up 160s, which are more difficult to mouth-inflate than the 260s, as their narrowness requires more strength and breath pressure to inflate.

== See also ==
- Ralph Dewey
