= Banin, Idlib =

Banin, Idlib بنين
- Village
- Location in Syria
- Coordinates: 35.711583°N 36.64075°E
- Country: Syria
- Governorate: Idlib
- District: Ariha District
- Subdistrict: Ariha Nahiyah

Population (2004)
  - Total: 743
- Time zone: UTC+2 (EET)
  - Summer (DST): UTC+3 (EEST)
- City Qrya Pcode: C4274

Banin, Idlib (Arabic: بنين) is a Syrian village located in Ariha Nahiyah in Ariha District, Idlib. According to the Syria Central Bureau of Statistics (CBS), Banin, Idlib had a population of 743 in the 2004 census.

== History ==
Banin has been heavily affected during the Syrian civil war, including by both repeated Syrian/Russian airstrikes and clashes between moderate rebel factions and jihadist extremists.

By late 2012, the Banin had been captured by Syrian rebel forces. On 12 December 2012, the Syrian Air Force bombed the village. On 27 December 2014, Syrian Air Force jet fighters conducted airstrikes over the village. On 12 November 2015, six weeks after the Russian air campaign in Syria began, Russian Air Force Mi-24 helicopters dropped white phosphorus munitions on the village during the night, a violation of the Protocol on Incendiary Weapons prohibiting the use of the incendiary weapons against civilian areas. At least one man was killed in the strike. On 16 November, a Russian airstrike destroyed a bakery in the village.

On 23 January 2017, moderate rebel group Suqour al-Sham captured Banin from the Salafi jihadist group al-Qaeda in Syria.

On 21 September 2017, a Russian Kalibr submarine-launched ballistic missile struck Banin. On 27 December, Syrian aircraft struck the outskirts of the village.

On 26 April 2019, an OTR-Tochka tactical ballistic missile carrying cluster munitions struck near a refugee camp near Banin, injuring several people. White Helmets inspected the remains of the missile. On 30 May, a government airstrike on the village killed one civilian and wounded another. On 1 June, a Su-24 bomber launched high-explosive missiles at the outskirts of the village in the midst of ongoing clashes 30 km away. On 19 June, government airstrikes destroyed a building in the village, killing eleven civilians and wounding six others. White Helmets workers searched the rubble for bodies and survivors.
