= Hish Subdistrict =

Hish Subdistrict ناحية حيش
- Nahiyah
- Location in Idlib Governorate

- Location in Syria
- Country: Syria
- Governorate: Idlib
- District: Maarrat al-Nu'man District

Population (2004)
  - Total: 41,231
- Time zone: UTC+2 (EET)
  - Summer (DST): UTC+3 (EEST)
- Nahya pcod: SY070205

Hish Subdistrict (Arabic: ناحية حيش) is a Syrian nahiyah (Subdistrict) located in Ma'arrat al-Nu'man District in Idlib. According to the Syria Central Bureau of Statistics (CBS), Hish Subdistrict had a population of 41231 in the 2004 census.
