= Maarat al-Numan Subdistrict =

Coordinates: 35.5692°N 36.7846°E

Maarat al-Numan Subdistrict ناحية مركز معرة النعمان
- Nahiyah
- Location in Idlib Governorate

- Location in Syria
- Country: Syria
- Governorate: Idlib
- District: Maarat al-Numan District

Population (2004)
  - Total: 149,834
- Time zone: UTC+2 (EET)
  - Summer (DST): UTC+3 (EEST)
- Nahya pcod: SY070200

Maarrat al-Numan Subdistrict (Arabic: ناحية مركز معرة النعمان) is a Syrian nahiyah (subdistrict) located in Maarat al-Numan District in Idlib. According to the Syria Central Bureau of Statistics (CBS), Maarat al-Numan Subdistrict had a population of 149834 in the 2004 census.
