= Kafr Nabl Subdistrict =

Kafr Nabl Subdistrict ناحية كفرنبل
- Nahiyah
- Location in Idlib Governorate

- Location in Syria
- Country: Syria
- Governorate: Idlib
- District: Maarrat al-Nu'man District
- Seat: Kafr Nabl

Population (2004)
  - Total: 67,460
- Time zone: UTC+2 (EET)
  - Summer (DST): UTC+3 (EEST)
- Nahya pcod: SY070203

Kafr Nabl Subdistrict (Arabic: ناحية كفرنبل) is a Syrian nahiyah (subdistrict) located in Ma'arrat al-Nu'man District in Idlib. According to the Syria Central Bureau of Statistics (CBS), Kafr Nabl Subdistrict had a population of 67,460 in the 2004 census.
