= Sinjar Subdistrict =

Sinjar Subdistrict ناحية سنجار
- Nahiyah
- Location in Idlib Governorate

- Location in Syria
- Country: Syria
- Governorate: Idlib
- District: Maarrat al-Nu'man District

Area
  - Total: 590.03 km^{2} (227.81 sq mi)

Population (2004)
  - Total: 33,721
- Time zone: UTC+2 (EET)
  - Summer (DST): UTC+3 (EEST)
- Nahya pcod: SY070202

Sinjar Subdistrict (Arabic: ناحية سنجار) is a Syrian nahiyah (subdistrict) located in Ma'arrat al-Nu'man District in Idlib. According to the Syria Central Bureau of Statistics (CBS), it had a population of 33,721 in the 2004 census.
