= Maarat al-Numan District =

Maarat al-Numan District مِنْطَقَة مَعَرَّةُ نُعْمَانِ
- District
- Map of Maarat al-Numan District within Idlib Governorate
- Coordinates (Maarat al-Numan): 35°38′N 36°40′E
- Country: Syria
- Governorate: Idlib
- Seat: Maarat al-Numan
- Subdistricts: 4 nawāḥī

Area
  - Total: 2,028.88 km^{2} (783.35 sq mi)

Population (2004)
  - Total: 371,829
  - Density: 183.268/km^{2} (474.662/sq mi)
- Geocode: SY0702

Maarat al-Numan District (Arabic: مِنْطَقَة مَعَرَّةُ نُعْمَانِ, romanized: Manṭiqat Maʿarrat Nuʿmān) is a district of the Idlib Governorate in northwestern Syria. The administrative centre is the city of Maarat al-Numan. At the 2004 census, the district had a population of 371,829.

== Sub-districts ==
The district of Maarat al-Numan is divided into six sub-districts or nawāḥī (population as of 2004):

- Maarat al-Numan Subdistrict (ناحية معرة نعمان): population 149,834.
- Khan Shaykhun Subdistrict (ناحية خان شيخون): population 34,371.
- Sinjar Subdistrict (ناحية سنجار): population 33,721.
- Kafr Nabl Subdistrict (ناحية كفر نبل): population 67,460.
- Al-Tamanah Subdistrict (ناحية التمانعة): population 29,114.
- Hish Subdistrict (ناحية حيش): population 41,231.
