= Sheikh Ali =

Sheikh Ali, Sheykh Ali, Sheykhali or Shaykh Ali (Persian: شيخ علي or شيخ عالي) may refer to:

== People ==
- Sheikh Ali Jaber, an Indonesian preacher and scholar
- Faiq Al Sheikh Ali, an Iraqi lawyer and politician
- Ali Al-Thani, a Qatari equestrian
- Sheikh Ali Madad, a Pakistani Shia Muslim religious leader and politician
- Sheikh Rajab Ali, a Pakistani Shia Muslim religious leader and politician
- Ali Dhere, a Somali cleric and religious fundamentalist
- Ali bin Abdullah Al Thani, the emir of Qatar between 1949 and 1960
- Sheikh Ali Jimale, a Somali politician
- Sheikh Ali Ilyas, a religious leader among the Yazidis
- Ali Salman, a Bahraini cleric
- Shaykh Ali Khan Zanganeh, an Iranian politician of Kurdish origin
- Ahmed Sheikh Ali, a Somali lawyer, author, and judge
- Shaykh Ali Khan, Khan of Quba and Derbent

== Places ==
=== Iran ===
- Sheykh Ali Tuseh, a village in Iran's Gilan province
- Sheykh Ali Bast, a village in Iran's Gilan province
- Sheykh Ali Mahalleh, Mazandaran, a village in Iran's Mazandaran province
- Shahrak-e Kalateh-ye Sheikh Ali, a village in Iran's South Khorasan province
- Sheykh Ali, Ardabil, a village in Iran's Ardabil province
- Sheykh Ali, Chaharmahal and Bakhtiari, a village in Iran's Chaharmahal and Bakhtiari province
- Sheykh Ali, Bastak, a village in Iran's Hormozgan province
- Sheykh Ali, Hajjiabad, a village in Iran's Hormozgan province
- Sheykh Ali, Khuzestan, a village in Iran's Khuzestan province
- Sarab-e Sheykh Ali, a village in Iran's Lorestan province
- Sheykhali, Lorestan, a village in Iran's Lorestan province
- Sheykhaleh, a village in Iran's Kurdistan province
- Sheykh Ali, West Azerbaijan, a village in Iran's West Azerbaijan province

=== Elsewhere ===
- Shaykh Ali, a village in Syria's Hama governorate
- Sheikh Ali District, in Afghanistan's Parwan province

== Other uses ==
- Sheikh Ali (Hazara tribe), a major tribe of Hazaras
