= Ali Kasun =

Ali Kasun علي كاسون
- Village
- Location in Syria
- Coordinates: 35.1772°N 36.9828°E
- Country: Syria
- Governorate: Hama
- District: Salamiyah
- Subdistrict: Salamiyah

Population (2004)
  - Total: 1,336
- Time zone: UTC+3 (AST)
- City Qrya Pcode: C3243

Ali Kasun (Arabic: علي كاسون), also known as Sheikh Ali Kassoun, is a village in central Syria, administratively part of the Salamiyah District of the Hama Governorate. It is located 30 kilometers (19 mi) east of Hama and 22 kilometers (14 mi) north of Salamiyah in the al-A'la plateau.

According to the Syria Central Bureau of Statistics (CBS), Ali Kasun had a population of 1,336 in the 2004 census. The village is named after a religious figure, Sheikh Ali Kasun, whose maqam (shrine) is located on a hilltop (650 meters (2,130 ft) above sea level) overlooking the village.

== History ==
The Sheikh Ali Kassoun Municipality was established in 1989 to administer the village. The municipality also incorporates the neighboring villages of Umm Tuweineh, Tamak, Tell Dahab, Tirad, Nawa, Sabba, al-Lahuna al-Shamaliya, al-Lahuna al-Janubiya and al-Uyur. The estimated population of the municipality was 6,800 in 2010.
