= Barri Sharqi =

Barri Sharqi بري شرقي Berri Sharqi
- Town
- Location in Syria
- Coordinates: 34.980643°N 37.202110°E
- Country: Syria
- Governorate: Hama
- District: Salamiyah
- Subdistrict: Barri Sharqi

Population (2004)
  - Total: 4,172
- Time zone: UTC+3 (AST)

Barri Sharqi (Arabic: بري شرقي; also spelled Berri Sharqi) is a town in northern Syria, administratively part of the Hama Governorate. It is located 50 kilometers (31 mi) east of Hama and 15 kilometers (9.3 mi) east of the district center of Salamiyah. It lies on the western outskirts of Jabal al-Balaas and the edge of the Syrian Desert. Nearby localities include Tell al-Tut, Aqarib to the north, Suha and Uqayribat to the east and al-Mukharram to the south. According to the Syria Central Bureau of Statistics, Barri Sharqi had a population of 4,172 in the 2004 census. Its inhabitants are predominantly Ismaili Muslims.

== History ==
=== Mamluk period ===
'Barri' is the name of an individual for whom the maqam (shrine) of 'Nabi Barri', located in the town, is dedicated. The town was purportedly the burial place of the 13th-century Bedouin tribal leader Fadl ibn Isa, who was killed during a dispute within his tribe, the Al Fadl of the Banu Tayy, which governed the tribes of the Syrian steppe throughout Ayyubid, Mamluk and early Ottoman rule. The name of 'Fadl ibn Isa ibn Muhanna' is inscribed on a gravestone in the Nabi Barri maqam.

=== Ottoman period ===
In 1838 Barri was classified as a khirba (ruined or deserted village) by English scholar Eli Smith. Around 1848, the deserted town of Salamiyah and the surrounding khirbas began to be resettled by Ismaili Shia Muslims from Syria's coastal Jabal Ansariyah mountains. As part of this movement, in 1876, Ismailis from Qadmus and the Khawabi valley in Jabal Ansariyah founded modern Barri, attracted to its fertile land, water sources and pleasant climate. Their first dwellings were huts constructed of mud and they restored and reutilized Byzantine-era canals from the 4th century.

=== Modern period ===
As of 2009, the inhabitants of Barri economically depended on rainfed agriculture, mainly the cultivation of olives, grapevines, wheat and barley, and sheep raising, and public sector jobs. The town is well known in the area for its traditional ataaba music.

== Bibliography ==
- Robinson, Edward; Smith, Eli (1841). Biblical Researches in Palestine, Mount Sinai and Arabia Petraea: A Journal of Travels in the Year 1838. Vol. 3. Crocker and Brewster.
