= Al-A'la plateau =

Coordinates: 35°7′42″N 36°56′0″E

The al-A'la plateau, or Jabal al-A'la (lit. 'the High [land]') is a plateau in central Syria, which rises east of the city of Hama, on the western fringes of the Syrian steppe. The plateau contains numerous villages with Byzantine-era inscriptions, found in the remains of mostly 6th-century homes, towers and churches. In the late 18th century, the region became a haven and area of settlement for the Mawali and other Bedouin tribes. Alawites began to settle in the area as well in the early 20th century.

== Geography ==
The al-A'la is a plateau which rises close to the city of Hama's eastern outskirts, and west of Salamiyah, and on the western margin of the Syrian steppe. It is roughly triangular in shape, measuring about 15 kilometers (9.3 mi) in breadth and 10 kilometers (6.2 mi) in length. It is the southernmost (and geographically detached) area of the basaltic rolling hill country which continues northward around 70 kilometers (43 mi) to Jabal al-Hass. The plateau is generally steep on all sides though its east side gently slopes into the desert. The plateau is generally flat and arable.

== Archaeology ==
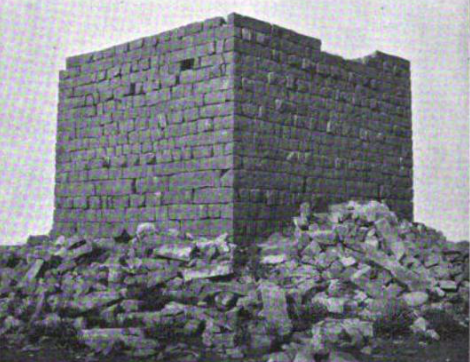
The Nawa monastery tower, 1904–1905

Several villages dot the plateau, most no further than 2 kilometers (1.2 mi) apart and nearly all built on ancient sites. Due to the villages' reconstructions, which reused the ancient basaltic building materials of their ruins, few standing remains are extant. Nevertheless, several reused and ancient Greek-inscribed basaltic lintels indicate an extensive Byzantine-era occupation. There are at least fifty Byzantine inscriptions, most dating to the reign of Emperor Justinian (r. 527–565), though about twenty date to the forty years which followed his death. Few are dated before the 6th century and the latest dates to 605 CE.

Most of the villages contained a defensive tower, probably to keep watch due to the plateau's high vulnerability to Bedouin raids from the desert. At least one, Umm Hartein, contained a rectangular citadel with towers on each corner. All the villages contained several houses, each characterized by one of two plans. The smaller homes consisted of two floors, the lower reserved for livestock. They faced paved courts containing a well which led to a cistern. The larger homes were similar, but contained more rooms or at least two wings. Many of the villages contained churches, all with basilical plans. There was at least one monastery on the plateau, that of Nawa, which contained a church dating to 598 CE. The largest village, in terms of the area of its ancient site, is Tuba, situated on al-A'la's north side. It contained a church dating to 582 CE, a tower and several houses. Other villages with Byzantine-era inscriptions include Danin, Qasr al-Mukharram, Msheirfeh, Tell Dahab, Ali Kasun, Zabada, Taybat al-Turki, Halban, al-Anz, Umm Tuweineh, Ruheibeh, Temek, Kunbus, Sabba and Abu al-Qudur.

== History ==
The epigraphic evidence suggests the A'la experienced significant prosperity during the reign of Justinian, which was in line with the general prosperity of his reign in Syria, but also continuing prosperity into the early 7th century, when much of Syria experience stagnation. There was no traceable building activity to Umayyad or Abbasid rule, collectively the 'early Muslim period' (mid-7th–11th centuries), though it is possible the villages' dwellings remained occupied during this period.

In the late 18th century, the A'la became one of the two main havens for the Mawali tribe, the other region being the Jabal Zawiya. The tribe, which had dominated the Syrian steppe since the beginning of Ottoman rule (1517–1918), had been driven there by the arrival of stronger Bedouin tribes, namely the Hasana. In the late 19th and early 20th centuries, the Mawali and Bani Khalid tribes had owned many of the A'la's villages and sold them to the urban notable families of Hama, particularly the Kaylani, Barazi and al-Azm. The inhabitants of the villages became tenant farmers and most were Sunni Muslim Arabs, but also Alawites who had settled there in the 1920s and 1930s, during French Mandatory rule.

Archaeological explorations of the A'la were conducted by Max von Oppenheim in 1899 and Princeton University in 1904–1905.

== Bibliography ==
- Comité de l'Asie française (April 1933). "Notes sur la propriété foncière dans le Syrie centrale (Notes on Landownership in Central Syria)". Bulletin du Comité de l'Asie française (in French). 33 (309). Comité de l'Asie française: 131–133.
- Douwes, Dick (2000). The Ottomans in Syria: A History of Justice and Oppression. I.B. Tauris. ISBN 1860640311.
- Foss, Clive (1997). "Syria in Transition, A. D. 550–750: An Archaeological Approach". Dumbarton Oaks Papers. 51: 189–269. doi:10.2307/1291765. JSTOR 1291765.
- Prentice, William Kelly (1922). Syria: Publications of the Princeton University Archaeological Expeditions to Syria in 1904-5 and 1909. Leiden: E. J. Brill.
