= Aniq Bajra =

Aniq Bajra عنيق باجرة
- Village
- Location in Syria
- Coordinates: 35°17′26″N 37°17′07″E
- Country: Syria
- Governorate: Hama
- District: Salamiyah
- Subdistrict: Saan

Population (2004)
  - Total: 313
- Time zone: UTC+3 (AST)
- City Qrya Pcode: C3290

Aniq Bajra (Arabic: عنيق باجرة) is a village in central Syria, administratively part of the Sa'an Subdistrict of Salamiyah District in the Hama Governorate. It lies on the fringe of the Syrian Desert along the Hama–Raqqa highway, about 68 kilometers (42 mi) east of Hama. The main economic activity is agriculture, namely olive and barley growing and livestock raising. According to the Syria Central Bureau of Statistics (CBS), Aniq Bajra had a population of 313 in the 2004 census.

== History ==
In the 1960 Syrian census, Aniq Bajra had a population of 49.

The Aniq Bajra Municipality was established in 1991 to administer Aniq Bajra, as well as the neighboring villages of Abu al-Qusur, Awja–Qabasin al-Arab and Abu Harij. In 2011, the villages of Hamdaniya and Umm Sarij were incorporated into the municipality. The villages of the municipality had a combined population of about 6,700 in 2012. Most of the inhabitants of the municipality belong to the Bashkam clan, a branch of the Arab Mawali tribe, while the inhabitants of Aniq Bajra village belong to the Al Abu Hamad clan, which was originally from the Mosul area in Iraq.

Aniq Bajra was retaken by the Syrian Arab Army on 21 January 2018 from the Islamic State.
