= Aqarib =

Aqarib عقارب Aqarib al-Safiyah
- Village
- Location in Syria
- Coordinates: 35.104133°N 37.210547°E
- Country: Syria
- Governorate: Hama
- District: Salamiyah
- Subdistrict: Sabburah

Population (2004)
  - Total: 3,830
- Time zone: UTC+3 (AST)

Aqarib (Arabic: عقارب), also known as Aqarib al-Safiyah (Arabic: عقارب الصافية), is a village in central Syria, administratively part of the Salamiyah District of the Hama Governorate. It is located 45 kilometres (28 mi) east of Hama and 17 kilometers (11 mi) east of Salamiyah, on the margin of the Syrian Desert. Nearby localities include Salamiyah and Tell al-Tut to the southwest, Uqayribat to the southeast and Sabburah to the north. According to the Syria Central Bureau of Statistics, Aqarib had a population of 3,830 in the 2004 census. Its inhabitants are predominantly Ismailis.

== History ==
Aqarib was founded in 1876 by Ismaili migrants from the area of Shaizar, a town west of Hama. The Ismailis had been evicted from their homes by a prominent landowning family based in Hama who owned the area around Shaizar. Part of the reason the migrants chose to settle in Aqarib was its proximity to Salamiyah, the center of Ismaili life in Syria. On 18 May 2017, ISIL fighters attacked the village at dawn and after regime forces fled the village the militants killed at least 52 civilians, including 16 children and 11 women.
