= Central Syria campaign =

Military operation of the Syrian Army

- Part of the Battle of Deir ez-Zor and the Russian military intervention in the Syrian civil war
- Situation in central Syria, showing advancements of the Syrian Army
Date	14 July – 21 October 2017 (3 months and 1 week)
Location	Central Syria: Southern Raqqa Governorate; Eastern and northern Homs Governorate; Eastern Hama Governorate; Deir ez-Zor, northwestern and southwestern Deir ez-Zor Governorate
Result	Decisive Syrian Army & allies victory: Syrian government forces capture 17,000 square kilometers of territory, including Al-Sukhnah; Syrian government forces cleared two separate pockets of ISIL forces in Central Syria and Eastern Hama; Syrian government forces lifted the siege of the western part of Deir ez-Zor city and Deir ez-Zor Airport; Syrian government's control of Syria increases to around 50% by the end of the offensive

Belligerents
(Syria) Syrian Arab Republic; Russia; Iran; Allied militias: Hezbollah; PMF-affiliated militias Syrian Resistance; Liwa Fatemiyoun; Jerusalem Brigade (Palestine) Galilee Forces (Syria) Saraya al-Areen	Islamic State: Al-Aqsa Brigade

Commanders and leaders
Maj. Gen. Suheil al-Hassan (Operations chief commander); Maj. Gen. Issam Zahreddine (Republican Guard commander); Brig. Gen. Mohamed Khaddor (commander of eastern Syria); Gen. Ghassan Iskendar Taraf (WIA) (Al-Qassem commander); Ahmed Salman Salloum † (Tiger Forces senior commander); Wael Zaidan † (Tiger Forces commander); Nawaf Al-Bashir (Al-Baggara Sheikh); Omar Al-Hassan (al-Baqir Brigade commander); Maj. Gen. Mustafa Khosh Mohammadi † (IRGC commander); Col. Morteza Hosseinpour-Shalmani † (Iranian-led Iraqi contingent operations commander); Gen. Abdullah Khosrawi † (Commander of Fatahin battalion); Ali al-Aa'shiq † (Radwan Force commander); Anwar Yawri † (Liwa Fatemiyoun commander); Turki Albu Hamad (Forces of the Fighters of the Tribes chief commander) (Palestine) Fadi al-Mellah (Galilee Forces commander)	(Islamic State) Gulmurod Khalimov (ISIL war minister, reported killed by Russia) (Islamic State) Abu Muhammad al-Shimali (Deir ez-Zor emir, reported killed by Russia) (Islamic State) Abu Khuzaymah al-Tunisi (surrendered) (Hisbah police chief) (Islamic State) Abu Saraqah Al-Trablosi † (ISIL top commander of Hama Governate)

Units involved
Syrian Arab Armed Forces; Syrian Arab Army; 1st Armoured Division; 3rd Armoured Division; Qalamoun Shield Forces; 5th Corps; ISIS Hunters; 18th Armoured Division; 4th Armoured Division; 38th Brigade; Republican Guard; 800th Regiment; Tiger Forces; National Defense Forces and tribal militias; Al-Shaitat militias; Al-Baggara militias; Baqir Brigade; Raqqawi militias; Syrian Arab Air Force; Military Intelligence Directorate; Forces of the Fighters of the Tribes; Falcons of the Euphrates; Russian Armed Forces; Russian Aerospace Forces; Russian Navy; Special Operations Forces; Wagner Group; "Thorbrandr" (Scandinavian volunteers); Armed Forces of the Islamic Republic of Iran; IRGC; Hezbollah military; Lebanese units; Radwan Force; Syrian units; Imam Mahdi Scouts from Nubl; Syrian Resistance; Falcons of the Jazira and Euphrates; PMF-affiliated militias; Kata'ib al-Imam Ali; Harakat Hezbollah al-Nujaba; Kata'ib Sayyid al-Shuhada	(Islamic State) Military of ISIL; Wilayat Hama; Wilayat Homs; Wilayat Raqqa; Wilayat Deir ez-Zor; Hisbah Police

Strength
50,000 (pro-government claim)	Several thousand fighters

Casualties and losses
(Syria) (Iran) 912 killed (10 IRGC, 36 Hezbollah killed) (Russia) 17 killed (15 PMCs)	1,394 killed
- 190 civilians killed

The Central Syria campaign, known as "Operation Khuzam", or "Lavender", was a large-scale military operation of the Syrian Arab Army (SAA) against the Islamic State (IS) during the Syrian Civil War. Its goal was to capture the strategic oil town of Al-Sukhnah, and besiege and capture 11,000 square kilometers of ISIL territory in central Syria, after which the Syrian Army would advance towards Deir ez-Zor, and lift the three-year ISIL siege of the government's enclave in the city. Afterwards, the Syrian Arab Army advanced towards the Islamic State's then-capital of Mayadin.

The campaign was concurrent with the Raqqa campaign conducted by the Syrian Democratic Forces (SDF) against the Islamic State's former capital city and stronghold in Syria, Raqqa. In addition, the SDF launched their own offensive in mid-September south along the Euphrates River, after Syrian government forces reached Deir ez-Zor city.

== The campaign ==
=== Syrian Army push into southern of the Raqqa Governorate ===
On 14 July 2017, the Syrian Army launched an offensive in the south of Raqqa province, advancing south of the town of Resafa and coming within 70 kilometers of Sukhnah after reaching the administrative border of Homs province. Between 15 and 16 July, a string of oil wells and gas fields was captured by the military. By 18 July, government forces pushed ISIL out of the western and southwestern parts of Raqqa province, while also reaching the outskirts of the Bishri Mountains, an ISIL stronghold.

With the start of the Syrian Government's push, the Russian Air Force launched a large-scale aerial campaign against ISIL in Raqqa and Homs provinces. An ISIL command-and-control center in Deir ez-Zor, targets along the Homs-Deir ez-Zor highway and positions near Sukhnah were reportedly hit.

Meanwhile, on 16 July, ISIL repelled an assault by the Syrian Army on the Hamimah area on the provincial border of Homs and Deir ez-Zor, killing a dozen soldiers and injuring or capturing 28 more. The captured soldiers were later reportedly decapitated. ISIL captured a tank and ammunition. Three days later, an ISIL raid on the administrative border overran an Army encampment before withdrawing. Concurrently, heavy fighting also erupted in Hama province. By 19 July, these clashes left 40 pro-government fighters, including two brigadier generals, and 29 militants dead.

On 21 July, the Syrian Army advanced between 30 and 35 kilometers east of Resafa. Four days later, major advances by government forces in the southeast of Raqqa reduced ISIL's control of the province to 10 percent. At this point, the Army was nine kilometers from the administrative border of Deir ez-Zor province. The Army was also making gains along the western bank of the Euphrates river. By the end of the day, they were six kilometers from the town of Maadan, located on the southern bank of the river, and the Deir ez-Zor provincial border.

=== Syrian Army advance along the Euphrates and capture of Sukhnah ===
Meanwhile, on 23 July, the Syrian Army's 5th Corps in the eastern part of Homs province launched an operation towards Sukhnah and the next day reportedly broke through ISIL's defense line before the town. On 25 July, massive Army reinforcements were arriving east of Palmyra for the upcoming assault on Sukhnah, following the implementation of a Russia/US-brokered ceasefire with the rebel FSA in the southwestern Badia region, where government forces had been conducting a two-month campaign. At the same time, Syrian Army troops advanced west of the Shaer gas field in the eastern countryside of Homs.

Elsewhere, on 25 July, the Syrian Army, backed up by Palestinian Al-Quds Brigade and local fighters, resumed their assault on the ISIL-held town of Qualib al-Thor in the eastern countryside of Hama Province. In the days before the resumption of Army operations in eastern Hama, the Russian Air Force conducted multiple strikes against ISIL.

On 26 July, ISIL conducted a counterattack against Syrian Army troops in an attempt to maintain its foothold in Raqqa province and defend Maadan. In the evening of that day, the Syrian Army captured the last hills eight kilometers southwest of Sukhnah, imposing fire control over the town. Several hours later, the Syrian Army started its attack on Sukhnah, quickly reaching its outskirts after a seven-kilometer advance and entering it from the west and south, according to military sources. According to the pro-opposition activist group the SOHR, government forces were still five kilometers from the town.

On 27 July, Syrian Army troops advanced to within four kilometers of Maadan, crossing the provincial boundary between Raqqa and Deir ez-Zor for the first time from the west.

Two days later, ISIL militants conducted an early-dawn raid against Syrian Army positions in the western countryside of Raqqa, forcing the Army to retreat. Soon after, Syrian Army troops regrouped and launched a counter-attack, pushing back the ISIL militants who withdrew with captured weapons and ammunition. Meanwhile, the Syrian Army entered the southwestern part of Sukhnah, while ISIL fighters started withdrawing from the town. Concurrently, the Syrian Army's Tiger Forces special unit redeployed from Raqqa province to eastern Hama for the upcoming offensive east of the town of Salamiyah. The same day, a large artillery bombardment of ISIL positions was conducted by Syrian Army and allied troops in the eastern Hama countryside in addition to airstrikes.

Late on 29 July, ISIL conducted a counterattack against the Syrian Army near the towns of Ghan Al-‘Ali and Shinan, pushing them back and cutting off their supply line to Ghan Al-‘Ali, as well as trapping a number of soldiers. 43 soldiers were killed and 65 wounded during the ISIL assault which included more than 10 suicide-bombers. The following day, the Syrian Army and tribal fighters regrouped and conducted a successful counter-attack, freeing the troops that were cut off. They then proceeded to advance into Ghan Al-‘Ali, eventually capturing the town, as well as several villages to the west of it. Syrian journalist Khaled Al-Khatib, who was working for the Russia Today television network, was killed when his vehicle was struck by an ISIL anti-tank missile in eastern Homs. By 31 July, Syrian Army forces advanced deep into the desert, coming within 40 kilometers of Deir ez-Zor city.

On 2 August, it was reported that the Syrian Army was only 700 meters from Sukhnah. The next day, after fierce street clashes, they had taken control of 20% of the town. Two days later, on 5 August, the Syrian Army took complete control of Sukhnah. A surprise ISIL raid near al-Tanf on 7 August led to the capture and subsequent execution of Mohsen Hojaji, an IRGC advisor. An image taken of Hojaji's last moments became iconic in Iran, and he became widely regarded as a nationally acclaimed "martyr" in the war against ISIL.

=== ISIL collapse and siege in Hama and Homs ===
On 9 August, as the Syrian Army advanced within four kilometers of Maadan in Raqqa province, ISIL conducted a large-scale assault in the east of Homs province near the strategic T-2 Pumping Station. Militants attacked Army positions in the Humaymah area, resulting in several hours of fierce fighting. The attack was eventually repelled, with the Army claiming more than 80 ISIL militants were killed, while they themselves lost 22 soldiers. In contrast, the SOHR reported the deaths of 32 Syrian Army soldiers and at least 35 ISIL militants. The ISIL attack took place on a 125 kilometer front.

Following a night-time operation late on 11 August, Syrian Army paratroopers, who landed behind ISIL's lines, captured two towns and 12 kilometers of desert in the southeast of Raqqa province. 25 ISIL militants and six Army commandos were killed during the operation.

Meanwhile, the Syrian government's Qalamoun Shield Forces, alongside the 5th Legion, also made a push towards ISIL's stronghold of Uqayribat in the eastern countryside of Hama, capturing several positions east of the village of Salba.

On 16 August, the Syrian Army made a push north of Al-Shaer mountains, overrunning ISIL positions in almost half a dozen areas, as other units progressed southwards from Ithriya and captured several hilltops. The next day, the Syrian Army's Tiger Forces suspended an offensive in the southeast of Raqqa Governorate in order to focus their efforts on the eastern Hama and Homs countrysides. This effort resulted in a myriad of military units storming arid, mountainous and sparsely inhabited, but oil and gas-rich ISIL-held areas in Central Syria from multiple directions, and the capture of more than half a dozen locations, including several of the oil and gas fields. During the same day, the 800th Regiment of the Republican Guard advanced 15 km north of Al-Sukhnah, capturing a checkpoint. ISIL fighters were left completely encircled between 50 and 100 villages in eastern Hama and Homs governorates on 18 August, as one group of Syrian Army troops advanced north of Al-Shaer mountains eventually linking up with recently redeployed Tiger Forces which pushed southwards from Ithriya. A smaller ISIL enclave formed south of the Ithriya-Zakia highway.

Elsewhere, Syrian Army forces captured southern and central parts of Humaymah village in the eastern Homs Province, after securing several hilltops near it the previous day. The village was completely secured on 21 August; however, ISIL launched a counter-attack on it hours later.

Between 23 and 24 August, the Army made advances northwest and west of Al-Sukhnah, with forces advancing north of the town and those advancing from Raqqa linking up and thus besieging a second large ISIL pocket in central Syria. Two days later, the pocket was cleared with the Army capturing an area of 2,000 square kilometers (772 square miles) between Sukhnah and Sha'er to the west.

=== ISIL counterattacks ===
During the evening of 23 August, ISIL forces in the western pocket attacked the Ithriyah-Salamiyah road in order to cut the Syrian government's main supply line to Aleppo, capturing two checkpoints south of the road (one of which was subsequently retaken by the Syrian Army and the National Defence Forces). At the same time, the rebel group Hay'at Tahrir al-Sham alongside Free Syrian Army shelled the supply line from the north; according to al-Masdar News, the ISIL attack was coordinated with the rebel groups. The next day, ISIL forces launched a large-scale operation west of Maadan alongside the western bank of the Euphrates, capturing seven villages from the Syrian Army and allied tribal fighters. Overall, government forces were pushed back 30 kilometers from the western outskirts of Maadan.

On 25 August, the Syrian Army stalled the ISIL assault against the Aleppo supply line and launched a counterattack, capturing three villages and putting themselves nine kilometers away from the ISIL stronghold at Uqayribat. The next day, the Tiger Forces troops also recaptured territory west of Maadan, but ISIL once again recaptured those same villages on 29 August.

=== Breaking of the siege of Deir ez-Zor city ===
On 27 August, the Syrian Army launched a major offensive along the Sukhna-Deir ez-Zor highway, advancing to positions 66 kilometers from Deir ez-Zor city by 29 August. On 31 August, the Syrian Army's Tiger Forces established full control over the strategic mountain of Bishiri, west of Deir ez-Zor. The offensive was accompanied by heavy Russian airstrikes on ISIL positions. They also captured the town of Haribshah. At this point, Syrian Army troops were 50 kilometers from Deir ez-Zor. By 2 September, the Syrian Army's Tiger Forces and 5th Corps alongside the Iran-backed Afghan Shia militia Liwa Fatemiyoun advanced from mount Bishiri towards Tal Al-Abd, Jabal Nazerat, Jabal Nairaman, and Jabal Admah, resulting in the capture of those hilltops and placing the Syrian Army within 25 km (16 mi) of lifting the siege imposed by ISIL for years on Deir ez-Zor city and within 16 km of village of al-Shulah, located southwest of the city. The next day, the Tiger Forces progressed further eastwards, coming within 18 km of Deir ez-Zor, capturing some minor hills in the desert and later in the day advancing towards al-Shulah and imposing fire control over the village from the north by securing Mount Neerman.

By 4 September, Syrian Army troops were within three kilometers of Deir ez-Zor, as ISIL sent reinforcements from Mayadin. The 5th Corps alongside the 18th Reserve Division captured the town of Kabajib during midday and later in the day captured the town of al-Shulah alongside the Tiger Forces.

The siege of the city was broken on 5 September 2017, at around 2 P.M. local time, when Syrian Army troops met the 137th Brigade on the western outskirts of the city.

A second phase of Deir ez-Zor operation began on 5 September, with the Tiger Forces and the 17th Division troops pushing southwards from 137th Brigade Base towards Ayyash Storage. The stated goal of this offensive was to eventually capture the Thardeh Mountains (which had been captured by ISIL fighters after CJTF-OIR forces launched a prolonged assault upon then-besieged Syrian Army soldiers in September 2016) and thus lift the siege of the airport imposed by ISIL since then. Two days later, the Syrian Army reported they had captured a gas factory and the 'Raqqa Bridge' near 137th Brigade Base, thus closing in on Ayyash Storage area as well as few hilltops near Tal Sannouf which resulted in securing the supply route to western Deir ez-Zor. Al-Qassem Republican Guard soldiers reported they had captured the hilltop of Talat Alloush within the perimeter of Deir ez-Zor cemetery after intense clashes with ISIL fighters on 8 September.

On 9 September, SANA reported that the Syrian Army had broken the siege of the airport and the city's districts of Hrabesh and Tahtouh. Russia's Defense Ministry said the lifting of the siege in the evening of 9 September had followed ″a massive air strike by the Russian Aerospace Forces″.

=== Syrian Army clears northwest Deir ez-Zor and southeast Raqqa ===
The Syrian Army launched an assault during the morning hours of 14 September After this, the Syrian Army was able to capture Maria'yah and secured its surroundings. After two days, the Syrian Army captured Ayyash and its nearby hill, reversing ISIL gains made during a previous offensive in 2016. The town of Jafrah, south of Deir ez-Zor was captured by the Syrian Army after days of clashes. Half a dozen towns were also captured the same day in the opposite direction from Deir ez-Zor, albeit with less fierce resistance from ISIL.

By 23 September, Syrian Government forces advancing northwest of Deir ez-Zor linked up with troops in southeast Raqqa and managed to capture Maadan, Overall, between 14 and 23 September, the military cleared between 1,300 and 1,700 square kilometers of territory, including 35 towns and villages, and secured the western bank of the Euphrates River in the northwestern countryside of Deir ez-Zor.

=== Collapse of the ISIL pocket in central Syria ===
On 28 August, the Syrian Army continued its operations in central Syria, targeting ISIL's last positions in the western countryside of Jabal Al-Sha’er and captured several areas. The Syrian Army and its allies resumed their operations in the southeastern countryside of Hama on 29 August, attacking ISIL's positions from two different axes. The pro-government forces of Qalamoun Shield stormed the group's positions east of Salamiyah, resulting in capture of al-Taybah. Following this, the Syrian Army advanced to southeast of Salamiyah and captured several hilltops in Abu Hakfeh area. By 31 August, they captured six settlements including 3 both to northeast and southeast of Uqayribat. They also captured the key al-Wahabiyah village in central Homs.

By 31 August, the Syrian Army and its allies had come within striking distance of Uqayribat. SOHR stated that Syrian Army captured Uqayribat on 1 September but ISIL regained control of most of the town after a counter-attack on the next day. The ISIL militants were however pushed out of the town again on the morning of 3 September with the help of artillery and airstrikes. SOHR stated that over 120 ISIL fighters and 35 pro-government fighters had died in 24 hours of clashes. Meanwhile, the Syrian Army also killed Abu Saraqah Al-Trablosi, a high-ranking Lebanese commander of ISIL. It also captured Mu’adamiyah and Al-Khafiyah in the eastern countryside of Uqayribat.

By 4 September, the Syrian Army captured the main ISIL base in the region near the town of Tahmaz in the east of Hama, while also securing two other towns west of Uqayribat. On 6 September, government forces captured half a dozen more villages. Villages of Zaghroutiyah, Drawayshiyah, Lawaybdah, Ghaniman, and Umm Sajj within eastern Homs governorate were captured on 13 September by Syrian Army alongside National Defense Forces and Hezbollah.

Later in September, the Thermal Power Plant was captured by Qalamoun Shield forces of 3rd Division, just 1 km away from village of Qulib al-Thor. The village itself was captured on 14 September. The next day ISIL forces launched an offensive in Jubb al-Jarrah district, overrunning Syrian Army positions and capturing the village of Abu Al-Tababir. On 16 September, rebels of Faylaq al-Majd stormed Syrian Army positions in northern Hama governorate, but failed to make any gains. During the same day Qalamoun Shield soldiers together with the National Defence Forces and Syrian Social Nationalist Party's armed wing took hold of hilltop Tal Al-Noba, along with the settlements of Al-Khalaya, Al-Mashrafah, and Khaled Hilal, later in the day entering the village of Abu Hanaya, resulting in capture of three quarters of it. 5th Legion soldiers captured the villages of Al-Mazbel and Masadeh, located within eastern Homs Governorate, on 21 September. On 22 September, the town of Mushayrifah Al-Shamaliyah was captured by the Syrian Army after a short firefight. All combat activities in eastern Hama and Homs governorates have concluded on 6 October resulting in Army's capture of remaining 1,800 km^{2} and erasing the pocket.

=== ISIL counteroffensive ===
On 28 September, ISIL launched its own counteroffensive, capturing the city of al-Qaryatayn in the Homs desert by 1 October. Fighting in the region left 569 killed between 28 September and 12 October, including 271 pro-government troops and 298 ISIL fighters. The Syrian Army recaptured al-Qaryatayn on 21 October. Bodies of 67 Syrian civilians who were summarily killed by ISIL, were found after Syrian forces captured the town. Some were shot as the militants retreated because they were suspected of collaborating with the government, per activists. A senior official said search and documentation of those killed was still underway and the toll was likely to climb. SOHR said 128 people were killed, including 12 by pro-government forces.

== Aftermath: advance on Al-Mayadin ==
Government forces steadily advanced in Deir ez-Zor governorate in the beginning of October, putting them within 6 km from ISIL's stronghold of Al-Mayadin. Syrian soldiers pushed into the city on 6 October. On 13 October, Government forces reached the Euphrates on the Eastern side of the Mayadin, besieging the town. On 14 October, the city was captured by the Syrian Army.
