= Rasm Al-Abed (disambiguation) =

Rasm Al-Abed or Rasm Elabed may refer to:

- Rasm al-Abed, a Syrian town located in Aleppo Governorate
- Rasm Elabed, a Syrian village located in Hama Governorate
- Rasm Elabed, Idlib, a Syrian village located in Idlib Governorate
