= Sabburah =

Sabburah صبورة
- Town
- Location in Syria
- Coordinates: 35.156407°N 37.209578°E
- Country: Syria
- Governorate: Hama
- District: Salamiyah
- Subdistrict: Sabburah
- Established: 1860's

Population (2004)
  - Total: 7,141
- Time zone: UTC+3 (AST)

Sabburah (Arabic: صبورة) is a town in northern Syria, administratively part of the Hama Governorate, located east of Hama and 25 kilometers northeast of Salamiyah, on the western edge of the Syrian Desert. Nearby localities include Aqarib to the south, Mabujah to the southeast and Khunayfis and al-Saan to the northeast.

According to the Syria Central Bureau of Statistics, Sabburah had a population of 7,141 in the 2004 census. It is the administrative center of the Sabburah nahiyah ("subdistrict") which consisted of 19 localities with a collective population of 21,900 in 2004. Its inhabitants are predominantly Alawites.

Sabburah was founded in the 1860s by Ismaili migrants from other parts of northern Syria who chose the place because of worsening economic conditions in the interior parts of Syria, the low taxes that living in the Syrian Desert fringes offered, and the place's proximity to the Ismaili center of Salamiyah. The settlement struggled to thrive, however, due to threats from the Bedouin tribesmen which inhabited the area. Sabburah has a high-frequency station for international radio service.
