= Hanuteh =

Hanuteh الحانوتة
- Village
- Location in Syria
- Coordinates: 35°3′6″N 37°32′54″E
- Country: Syria
- Governorate: Hama
- District: Salamiyah District
- Subdistrict: Uqayribat Subdistrict

Population (2004)
  - Total: 888
- Time zone: UTC+3 (AST)
- City Qrya Pcode: C3325

Hanuteh (Arabic: الحانوتة) is a Syrian village located in Uqayribat Subdistrict in Salamiyah District, Hama. According to the Syria Central Bureau of Statistics (CBS), Hanuteh had a population of 888 in the 2004 census.
