= Umm Qalaq =

Umm Qalaq أم قلق
- Village
- Location in Syria
- Coordinates: 35.288332°N 36.965926°E
- Country: Syria
- Governorate: Hama
- District: Salamiyah District
- Subdistrict: Salamiyah Subdistrict

Population (2004)
  - Total: 272
- Time zone: UTC+3 (AST)
- City Qrya Pcode: C3215

Umm Qalaq (Arabic: أم قلق) is a Syrian village located in Salamiyah Subdistrict in Salamiyah District, Hama. According to the Syria Central Bureau of Statistics (CBS), Umm Qalaq had a population of 272 in the 2004 census.

During Ba'athist rule, the city was known as al-Thawra (Arabic: الثورة, lit. 'the Revolution'), in reference to the 1963 Ba'athist coup d’état in Syria.
