= Al Qastal =

Al Qastal may refer to the following places in the Levant:

== Jordan ==
- Al Qastal, Jordan

== Israel ==
- Al Qastal, Jerusalem, now Castel National Park

== Syria ==
- Al-Qastal, Damascus, a village in the countryside of Damascus
- Qastal, Hama, a village in central Syria's desert
- Qastal al-Burj, a Christian hamlet in the Hama Governorate
- Qastal Ma'af, a village in the Homs Governorate
