= Harat al-Sharqiyyah =

Harat al-Sharqiyyah الهرط الشرقي
- Village
- Location in Syria
- Coordinates: 35.238206°N 37.322745°E
- Country: Syria
- Governorate: Hama
- District: Salamiyah District
- Subdistrict: Al-Saan Subdistrict

Population (2004)
  - Total: 610
- Time zone: UTC+3 (AST)
- City Qrya Pcode: C3292

Harat al-Sharqiyyah (Arabic: الهرط الشرقي) is a Syrian village located in Al-Saan Subdistrict in Salamiyah District, Hama. According to the Syria Central Bureau of Statistics (CBS), Harat al-Sharqiyyah had a population of 610 in the 2004 census.
