= Fawrah =

Fweira فويرة
- Village
- Location in Syria
- Country: Syria
- Governorate: Hama
- District: Salamiyah District
- Subdistrict: Sabburah Subdistrict

Population (2004)
  - Total: 244
- Time zone: UTC+3 (AST)
- City Qrya Pcode: C3310

Fweira (Arabic: فويرة) is a Syrian village located in Sabburah Subdistrict in Salamiyah District, Hama. According to the Syria Central Bureau of Statistics (CBS), Fweira had a population of 244 in the 2004 census.
