= Abul Gor =

Abul Gor أبو الغر
- Village
- Location in Syria
- Coordinates: 35°20′13″N 37°23′44″E
- Country: Syria
- Governorate: Hama
- District: Salamiyah District
- Subdistrict: Al-Saan Subdistrict

Population (2004)
  - Total: 261
- Time zone: UTC+3 (AST)
- City Qrya Pcode: C3287

Abul Gor (Arabic: أبو الغر) is a Syrian village located in Al-Saan Subdistrict in Salamiyah District, Hama. According to the Syria Central Bureau of Statistics (CBS), Abul Gor had a population of 261 in the 2004 census.
