= Arshunah =

Arshuneh عرشونة
- Village
- Location in Syria
- Coordinates: 34.964637°N 37.296487°E
- Country: Syria
- Governorate: Hama
- District: Salamiyah District
- Subdistrict: Barri Sharqi Subdistrict

Population (2004)
  - Total: 865
- Time zone: UTC+3 (AST)
- City Qrya Pcode: C3264

Arshuneh (Arabic: عرشونة) is a Syrian village located in Barri Sharqi Subdistrict in Salamiyah District, Hama. According to the Syria Central Bureau of Statistics (CBS), Arshuneh had a population of 865 in the 2004 census.
