= Sunaydah =

Snideh سنيدة
- Village
- Location in Syria
- Coordinates: 34°54′20″N 37°0′10″E
- Country: Syria
- Governorate: Hama
- District: Salamiyah District
- Subdistrict: Salamiyah Subdistrict

Population (2004)
  - Total: 706
- Time zone: UTC+3 (AST)
- City Qrya Pcode: C3219

Snideh (Arabic: سنيدة) is a Syrian village located in Salamiyah Subdistrict in Salamiyah District, Hama. According to the Syria Central Bureau of Statistics (CBS), Snideh had a population of 706 in the 2004 census.
