= Bardunah =

Berdoneh البردونة
- Village
- Location in Syria
- Coordinates: 35°14′12″N 36°58′26″E
- Country: Syria
- Governorate: Hama
- District: Salamiyah District
- Subdistrict: Salamiyah Subdistrict

Population (2004)
  - Total: 862
- Time zone: UTC+3 (AST)
- City Qrya Pcode: C3231

Berdoneh (Arabic: البردونة) is a Syrian village located in Salamiyah Subdistrict in Salamiyah District, Hama. According to the Syria Central Bureau of Statistics (CBS), Berdoneh had a population of 862 in the 2004 census. It is a Sunni village.

== History ==
Berdoneh was populated during the Byzantine period and still contains a number of visible ruins from that era. However, the modern village was not founded until 1860, after a long period of abandonment.
