= Tell al-Ghir =

Tal Agher تل أغر
- Village
- Location in Syria
- Country: Syria
- Governorate: Hama
- District: Salamiyah District
- Subdistrict: Sabburah Subdistrict

Population (2004)
  - Total: 679
- Time zone: UTC+3 (AST)
- City Qrya Pcode: C3304

Tal Agher (Arabic: تل أغر) is a Syrian village located in Sabburah Subdistrict in Salamiyah District, Hama. According to the Syria Central Bureau of Statistics (CBS), Tal Agher had a population of 679 in the 2004 census.
