= Jeb Zreiq =

Jeb Zreiq جب زريق
- Village
- Location in Syria
- Country: Syria
- Governorate: Hama
- District: Salamiyah District
- Subdistrict: Sabburah Subdistrict

Population (2004)
  - Total: 354
- Time zone: UTC+3 (AST)
- City Qrya Pcode: C3298

Jeb Zreiq (Arabic: جب زريق) is a Syrian village located in Sabburah Subdistrict in Salamiyah District, Hama. According to the Syria Central Bureau of Statistics (CBS), Jeb Zreiq had a population of 354 in the 2004 census.

== Syrian Civil War ==
Jeb Zreiq remained under the control for the Syrian government for most of the active phase of the Civil War, though it was captured by ISIS in December 2017. By the beginning of February 2018, the Syrian Army had retaken the village. As of 13 February 2025, the village is uninhabited.
