= Fan Wastani =

Fan Wastani فان وسطاني
- Village
- Location in Syria
- Coordinates: 35°17′N 36°55′E
- Country: Syria
- Governorate: Hama
- District: Salamiyah District
- Subdistrict: Salamiyah Subdistrict

Population (2004)
  - Total: 847
- Time zone: UTC+3 (AST)
- City Qrya Pcode: C3252

Fan Wastani (Arabic: فان وسطاني) is a Syrian village located in Salamiyah Subdistrict in Salamiyah District, Hama. According to the Syria Central Bureau of Statistics (CBS), Fan Wastani had a population of 847 in the 2004 census.
