= Qanafeth =

Qanafeth قنافذ
- Village
- Location in Syria
- Coordinates: 35.226522°N 37.274898°E
- Country: Syria
- Governorate: Hama
- District: Salamiyah District
- Subdistrict: Sabburah Subdistrict

Population (2004)
  - Total: 550
- Time zone: UTC+3 (AST)
- City Qrya Pcode: C3309

Qanafeth (Arabic: قنافذ) is a Syrian village located in Sabburah Subdistrict in Salamiyah District, Hama. According to the Syria Central Bureau of Statistics (CBS), Qanafeth had a population of 550 in the 2004 census. It is a mixed village inhabited by Alawites and Sunni Muslims.

== Syrian Civil War ==
On 26 May 2014, opposition factions captured the village. At least five people were killed when the village was attacked by ISIS on 5 March 2015.
