= Dweibeh =

Dweibeh دويبة
- Village
- Location in Syria
- Coordinates: 35.2375°N 36.9122°E
- Country: Syria
- Governorate: Hama
- District: Salamiyah District
- Subdistrict: Salamiyah Subdistrict

Population (2004)
  - Total: 394
- Time zone: UTC+3 (AST)
- City Qrya Pcode: C3210

Dweibeh (Arabic: دويبة) is a Syrian village located in Salamiyah Subdistrict in Salamiyah District, Hama. According to the Syria Central Bureau of Statistics (CBS), Dweibeh had a population of 394 in the 2004 census.
