= Shahba, Hama =

Shahba, Hama شهبا
- Village
- Location in Syria
- Coordinates: 35.193253°N 37.086746°E
- Country: Syria
- Governorate: Hama
- District: Salamiyah District
- Subdistrict: Sabburah Subdistrict

Population (2004)
  - Total: 833
- Time zone: UTC+3 (AST)
- City Qrya Pcode: C3295

Shahba, Hama (Arabic: شهبا) is a Syrian village located in Sabburah Subdistrict in Salamiyah District, Hama. According to the Syria Central Bureau of Statistics (CBS), Shahba, Hama had a population of 833 in the 2004 census. Its inhabitants are predominantly Alawites.
