= Jruh =

Jruh جروح
- Village
- Location in Syria
- Coordinates: 35.1050°N 37.4950°E
- Country: Syria
- Governorate: Hama
- District: Salamiyah District
- Subdistrict: Uqayribat Subdistrict

Population (2004)
  - Total: 1,223
- Time zone: UTC+3 (AST)
- City Qrya Pcode: C3326

Jruh (Arabic: جروح) is a Syrian village located in Uqayribat Subdistrict in Salamiyah District, Hama. According to the Syria Central Bureau of Statistics (CBS), Jruh had a population of 1,223 in the 2004 census.
