= Rasm Al-Brdkana =

Rasm Al-Brdkana رسم البردقانة
- Village
- Country: Syria
- Governorate: Hama
- District: Salamiyah District
- Subdistrict: Uqayribat Subdistrict

Population (2004)
  - Total: 67
- Time zone: UTC+3 (AST)
- City Qrya Pcode: N/A

Rasm Al-Brdkana (Arabic: رسم البردقانة) is a Syrian village located in Uqayribat Subdistrict in Salamiyah District, Hama. According to the Syria Central Bureau of Statistics (CBS), Rasm Al-Brdkana had a population of 67 in the 2004 census.
