= Shakara, Hama =

Shakara, Hama شكاري
- Village
- Location in Syria
- Coordinates: 34.940989°N 37.003042°E
- Country: Syria
- Governorate: Hama
- District: Salamiyah District
- Subdistrict: Salamiyah Subdistrict

Population (2004)
  - Total: 344
- Time zone: UTC+3 (AST)
- City Qrya Pcode: C3247

Shakara, Hama (Arabic: شكاري) is a Syrian village located in Salamiyah Subdistrict in Salamiyah District, Hama. According to the Syria Central Bureau of Statistics (CBS), Shakara, Hama had a population of 344 in the 2004 census.
