= Dakileh =

Dakileh دكيلة
- Village
- Location in Syria
- Coordinates: 35°10′35″N 37°23′4″E
- Country: Syria
- Governorate: Hama
- District: Salamiyah District
- Subdistrict: Uqayribat Subdistrict

Population (2004)
  - Total: 561
- Time zone: UTC+3 (AST)
- City Qrya Pcode: C3313

Dakileh (Arabic: دكيلة) is a Syrian village located in Uqayribat Subdistrict in Salamiyah District, Hama. According to the Syria Central Bureau of Statistics (CBS), Dakileh had a population of 561 in the 2004 census. It was captured by ISIL during the Syrian Civil War but later retaken by the SAA on 20 August 2017.
