= Hdaj =

Hdaj هداج
- Village
- Location in Syria
- Coordinates: 35°5′55″N 37°40′51″E
- Country: Syria
- Governorate: Hama
- District: Salamiyah District
- Subdistrict: Uqayribat Subdistrict

Population (2004)
  - Total: 418
- Time zone: UTC+3 (AST)
- City Qrya Pcode: C3331

Hdaj (Arabic: هداج) is a Syrian village located in Uqayribat Subdistrict in Salamiyah District, Hama. According to the Syria Central Bureau of Statistics (CBS), Hdaj had a population of 418 in the 2004 census. Hdaj was captured by Syrian Army on 31 August 2017.
