= Khafiyeh =

Khafiyeh الخفية
- Village
- Location in Syria
- Coordinates: 34°55′56″N 37°10′42″E
- Country: Syria
- Governorate: Hama
- District: Salamiyah District
- Subdistrict: Salamiyah Subdistrict

Population (2004)
  - Total: 119
- Time zone: UTC+3 (AST)
- City Qrya Pcode: C3228

Khafiyeh (Arabic: الخفية) is a Syrian village located in Salamiyah Subdistrict in Salamiyah District, Hama. According to the Syria Central Bureau of Statistics (CBS), Khafiyeh had a population of 119 in the 2004 census.
