= Rasm Elahmar =

Rasm Elahmar رسم الأحمر
- Village
- Location in Syria
- Coordinates: 35°6′32″N 37°25′17″E
- Country: Syria
- Governorate: Hama
- District: Salamiyah District
- Subdistrict: Uqayribat Subdistrict

Population (2004)
  - Total: 493
- Time zone: UTC+3 (AST)
- City Qrya Pcode: N/A

Rasm Elahmar (Arabic: رسم الأحمر) is a Syrian village located in Uqayribat Subdistrict in Salamiyah District, Hama. According to the Syria Central Bureau of Statistics (CBS), Rasm Elahmar had a population of 493 in the 2004 census.
