= Tuba, Hama =

Tuba الطوبة
- Village
- Location in Syria
- Coordinates: 35.274941°N 36.988388°E
- Country: Syria
- Governorate: Hama
- District: Salamiyah
- Subdistrict: Salamiyah

Population (2004)
  - Total: 262
- Time zone: UTC+3 (AST)
- City Qrya Pcode: C3246

Tuba (Arabic: الطوبة, romanized: al-Ṭūbā) is a village in central Syria, administratively part of the Salamiyah District of the Hama Governorate. According to the Syria Central Bureau of Statistics (CBS), Tuba had a population of 262 in the 2004 census.

== History ==
Tuba is the largest of several Byzantine-era villages on the al-A'la plateau east of Hama, which prospered during the reign of Justinian (r. 527–565) and the late 6th century. Among the ruins in Tuba was a church dated to 582 CE, as evidenced by an inscribed basaltic lintel. The village also contained a defensive tower and several houses, at least one of which dated to 573.

Prior to the end of the Syrian Civil War, the village was populated by Alawites. They fled or were exiled from their homes in late 2024. Since January 2025, it has been inhabited by IDPs who had previously been living in Afrin and Ihtaimlat.

== Bibliography ==
- Foss, Clive (1997). "Syria in Transition, A. D. 550–750: An Archaeological Approach". Dumbarton Oaks Papers. 51: 189–269. doi:10.2307/1291765.
