= Qubaybat =

Qubaybat قبيبات
- Village
- Location in Syria
- Coordinates: 35°12′18″N 37°9′35″E
- Country: Syria
- Governorate: Hama
- District: Salamiyah
- Subdistrict: Sabburah

Population (2004)
  - Total: 483
- Time zone: UTC+3 (AST)
- City Qrya Pcode: C3307

Qubaybat (Arabic: قبيبات, also spelled Qbeibat or Qubayyat) is a Syrian village located in Sabburah Subdistrict in Salamiyah District, Hama. According to the Syria Central Bureau of Statistics (CBS), Qbeibat had a population of 483 in the 2004 census. Its inhabitants are predominantly Alawites.
