= Bustan Sbeih =

Bustan Sbeih بستان صبيح
- Village
- Location in Syria
- Coordinates: 34°57′34″N 37°33′47″E
- Country: Syria
- Governorate: Hama
- District: Salamiyah District
- Subdistrict: Uqayribat Subdistrict

Population (2004)
  - Total: 214
- Time zone: UTC+3 (AST)
- City Qrya Pcode: C3329

Bustan Sbeih (Arabic: بستان صبيح) is a Syrian village located in Uqayribat Subdistrict in Salamiyah District, Hama. According to the Syria Central Bureau of Statistics (CBS), Bustan Sbeih had a population of 214 in the 2004 census.
