= Al-Rubbah =

Al-Rubbah الربا
- Village
- Location in Syria
- Coordinates: 35.126507°N 36.975024°E
- Country: Syria
- Governorate: Hama
- District: Salamiyah District
- Subdistrict: Salamiyah Subdistrict

Population (2004)
  - Total: 1,813
- Time zone: UTC+3 (AST)
- City Qrya Pcode: C3240

Al-Rubbah (Arabic: الربا) is a Syrian village located in Salamiyah Subdistrict in Salamiyah District, Hama. According to the Syria Central Bureau of Statistics (CBS), Al-Rubbah had a population of 1813 in the 2004 census. The nearby Tell Rubba dates back to the Hellenistic period. Its inhabitants are predominantly Alawites.
