= Samiriyah =

Samiriyeh سميرية
- Village
- Location in Syria
- Coordinates: 35.288934°N 37.180073°E
- Country: Syria
- Governorate: Hama
- District: Salamiyah District
- Subdistrict: Sabburah Subdistrict

Population (2004)
  - Total: 960
- Time zone: UTC+3 (AST)
- City Qrya Pcode: C3301

Samiriyeh (Arabic: سميرية) is a Syrian village located in Sabburah Subdistrict in Salamiyah District, Hama. According to the Syria Central Bureau of Statistics (CBS), Samiriyeh had a population of 960 in the 2004 census.

== Syrian Civil War ==
On 4 February 2018, the Syrian Arab Army recaptured the settlement from ISIL.
