= Al-Hardanah =

Hardana الحردانة
- Village
- Location in Syria
- Coordinates: 34.999558°N 37.271853°E
- Country: Syria
- Governorate: Hama
- District: Salamiyah District
- Subdistrict: Barri Sharqi Subdistrict

Population (2004)
  - Total: 142
- Time zone: UTC+3 (AST)
- City Qrya Pcode: C3266

Hardana (Arabic: الحردانة) is a Syrian village located in Barri Sharqi Subdistrict in Salamiyah District, Hama. According to the Syria Central Bureau of Statistics (CBS), Hardana had a population of 142 in the 2004 census.
