= Tell Hasan Basha =

Tal Hasan Pasha تل حسن باشا
- Village
- Location in Syria
- Country: Syria
- Governorate: Hama
- District: Salamiyah District
- Subdistrict: Salamiyah Subdistrict

Population (2004)
  - Total: 1,180
- Time zone: UTC+3 (AST)
- City Qrya Pcode: C3249

Tell Hasan Basha (Arabic: تل حسن باشا, romanized: Tall Hasan Bāshā) is a Syrian village located in Salamiyah Subdistrict in Salamiyah District, Hama. According to the Syria Central Bureau of Statistics (CBS), Tal Hasan Basha had a population of 1,180 in the 2004 census.
