= Abu Hbeilat =

Abu Hbeilat أبو حبيلات
- Village
- Location in Syria
- Coordinates: 35.032447°N 37.310300°E
- Country: Syria
- Governorate: Hama
- District: Salamiyah District
- Subdistrict: Barri Sharqi Subdistrict

Population (2004)
  - Total: 299
- Time zone: UTC+3 (AST)
- City Qrya Pcode: C3263

Abu Hbeilat (Arabic: أبو حبيلات) is a Syrian village located in Barri Sharqi Subdistrict in Salamiyah District, Hama. According to the Syria Central Bureau of Statistics (CBS), Abu Hbeilat had a population of 299 in the 2004 census. As of 17 February 2025, the village had a population of 64 people.
