= Hasu al-Qiblawi =

Hasu al-Qiblawi حسو العلباوي
- Village
- Location in Syria
- Coordinates: 35°13′16″N 37°25′37″E
- Country: Syria
- Governorate: Hama
- District: Salamiyah
- Subdistrict: Sa'an

Population (2004)
  - Total: 696
- Time zone: UTC+3 (AST)
- City Qrya Pcode: C3276

Hasu al-Qiblawi (Arabic: حسو العلباوي) is a village in central Syria, administratively part of the al-Saan Subdistrict of the Salamiyah District of the Hama Governorate. It is one the villages of the Shaykh Hilal municipality. According to the Syria Central Bureau of Statistics (CBS), Hasu al-Qiblawi had a population of 696 according to the 2004 census.
