= Tell al-Shih =

Tal Al-Shih تل الشيح
- Village
- Country: Syria
- Governorate: Hama
- District: Salamiyah District
- Subdistrict: Sabburah Subdistrict

Population (2004)
  - Total: 193
- Time zone: UTC+3 (AST)
- City Qrya Pcode: N/A

Tal Al-Shih (Arabic: تل الشيح) is a Syrian village located in Sabburah Subdistrict in Salamiyah District, Hama. According to the Syria Central Bureau of Statistics (CBS), Tal Al-Shih had a population of 193 in the 2004 census.
