= Theil Elejel =

Theil Elejel ذيل العجل
- Village
- Location in Syria
- Coordinates: 35.080918°N 37.128618°E
- Country: Syria
- Governorate: Hama
- District: Salamiyah District
- Subdistrict: Salamiyah Subdistrict

Population (2004)
  - Total: 528
- Time zone: UTC+3 (AST)
- City Qrya Pcode: C3236

Theil Elejel (Arabic: ذيل العجل) is a Syrian village located in Salamiyah Subdistrict in Salamiyah District, Hama. According to the Syria Central Bureau of Statistics (CBS), Theil Elejel had a population of 528 in the 2004 census.
