= Eliyeh =

Eliyeh العلية
- Village
- Location in Syria
- Coordinates: 35°15′13″N 37°25′48″E
- Country: Syria
- Governorate: Hama
- District: Salamiyah District
- Subdistrict: Al-Saan Subdistrict

Population (2004)
  - Total: 518
- Time zone: UTC+3 (AST)
- City Qrya Pcode: C3288

Eliyeh (Arabic: العلية) is a Syrian village located in Al-Saan Subdistrict in Salamiyah District, Hama. According to the Syria Central Bureau of Statistics (CBS), Eliyeh had a population of 518 in the 2004 census.
