= Karim, Salamiyah =

Karim الكريم
- Village
- Location in Syria
- Coordinates: 35.019423°N 37.004026°E
- Country: Syria
- Governorate: Hama
- District: Salamiyah District
- Subdistrict: Salamiyah Subdistrict

Population (2004)
  - Total: 1,239
- Time zone: UTC+3 (AST)
- City Qrya Pcode: C3226

Karim (Arabic: الكريم) is a Syrian village located in Salamiyah Subdistrict in Salamiyah District, Hama. According to the Syria Central Bureau of Statistics (CBS), Karim had a population of 1239 in the 2004 census.
