= Umm Khurayzah =

Um Khreizeh أم خريزة
- Village
- Location in Syria
- Coordinates: 35.2342°N 37.1875°E
- Country: Syria
- Governorate: Hama
- District: Salamiyah District
- Subdistrict: Sabburah Subdistrict

Population (2004)
  - Total: 250
- Time zone: UTC+3 (AST)
- City Qrya Pcode: C3302

Um Khreizeh (Arabic: أم خريزة) is a Syrian village located in Sabburah Subdistrict in Salamiyah District, Hama. According to the Syria Central Bureau of Statistics (CBS), Um Khreizeh had a population of 250 in the 2004 census.
