= Jani Elelbawi =

Jani Elelbawi جني العلباوي
- Village
- Location in Syria
- Coordinates: 35.1692°N 37.4536°E
- Country: Syria
- Governorate: Hama
- District: Salamiyah District
- Subdistrict: Uqayribat Subdistrict

Population (2004)
  - Total: 835
- Time zone: UTC+3 (AST)
- City Qrya Pcode: C3321

Jani Elelbawi (Arabic: جني العلباوي) is a Syrian village located in Uqayribat Subdistrict in Salamiyah District, Hama. According to the Syria Central Bureau of Statistics (CBS), Jani Elelbawi had a population of 835 in the 2004 census. Jani Elelbawi was captured by Syrian Army on 22 August 2017.
