= Kaytalun =

Kitlun كيتلون
- Village
- Location in Syria
- Coordinates: 35.0878°N 36.9933°E
- Country: Syria
- Governorate: Hama
- District: Salamiyah District
- Subdistrict: Salamiyah Subdistrict

Population (2004)
  - Total: 1,858
- Time zone: UTC+3 (AST)
- City Qrya Pcode: C3256

Kitlun (Arabic: كيتلون) is a Syrian village located in Salamiyah Subdistrict in Salamiyah District, Hama. According to the Syria Central Bureau of Statistics (CBS), Kitlun had a population of 1,858 in the 2004 census. Its inhabitants are predominantly Alawites.
