= Shuhayb =

Sheheib الشهيب
- Village
- Location in Syria
- Coordinates: 35.202252°N 37.109606°E
- Country: Syria
- Governorate: Hama
- District: Salamiyah District
- Subdistrict: Sabburah Subdistrict

Population (2004)
  - Total: 567
- Time zone: UTC+3 (AST)
- City Qrya Pcode: C3303

Sheheib (Arabic: الشهيب) is a Syrian village located in Sabburah Subdistrict in Salamiyah District, Hama. According to the Syria Central Bureau of Statistics (CBS), Sheheib had a population of 567 in the 2004 census.
