= Makaymin Shamali =

Northern Mkeimin مكيمن شمالي
- Village
- Location in Syria
- Coordinates: 35.128144°N 37.416950°E
- Country: Syria
- Governorate: Hama
- District: Salamiyah District
- Subdistrict: Uqayribat Subdistrict

Population (2004)
  - Total: 1,028
- Time zone: UTC+3 (AST)
- City Qrya Pcode: C3334

Northern Mkeimin (Arabic: مكيمن شمالي) is a Syrian village located in Uqayribat Subdistrict in Salamiyah District, Hama. According to the Syria Central Bureau of Statistics (CBS), Northern Mkeimin had a population of 1,028 in the 2004 census.
