= Tell Abd al-Aziz =

Tell Abdel Aziz تل عبد العزيز
- Village
- Location in Syria
- Coordinates: 35°14′0″N 37°8′56″E
- Country: Syria
- Governorate: Hama
- District: Salamiyah
- Subdistrict: Sabburah

Population (2004)
  - Total: 542
- Time zone: UTC+3 (AST)
- City Qrya Pcode: C3305

Tell Abdel Aziz (Arabic: تل عبد العزيز) is a village in central Syria, administratively part of the Sabburah Subdistrict of the Salamiyah District of the Hama Governorate. It is located 65 kilometers (40 mi) east of Hama and 30 kilometers (19 mi) north of Salamiyah. According to the Syria Central Bureau of Statistics (CBS), Tell Abdel Aziz had a population of 542 in the 2004 census. It was an Alawite village.

The village was named after Abdel Aziz, the sheikh of a Bedouin tribe that settled on the tell (archaeological mound) adjacent to the village. Most of the modern constructions are built from reinforced concrete, but the village retains several of its traditional clay-built beehive houses. The inhabitants of Tell Abd al-Aziz mainly depend on rain-fed agriculture. The main crops are grapes, and to a lesser extent barley, wheat and orchard fruits, and around 2009 the villagers began growing olives and raising livestock. The second main source of employment is in the public sector.

Since the end of the Syrian Civil War, many of the villages families have been displaced.
