= Rweideh =

Rweideh الرويضة
- Village
- Location in Syria
- Coordinates: 35°6′41″N 37°33′41″E
- Country: Syria
- Governorate: Hama
- District: Salamiyah District
- Subdistrict: Uqayribat Subdistrict

Population (2004)
  - Total: 266
- Time zone: UTC+3 (AST)
- City Qrya Pcode: C3314

Rweideh (Arabic: الرويضة) is a Syrian village located in Uqayribat Subdistrict in Salamiyah District, Hama. According to the Syria Central Bureau of Statistics (CBS), Rweideh had a population of 266 in the 2004 census.
