= Jeb Khsara =

Jeb Khsara جب خسارة
- Village
- Location in Syria
- Coordinates: 35.209107°N 37.319211°E
- Country: Syria
- Governorate: Hama
- District: Salamiyah District
- Subdistrict: Al-Saan Subdistrict

Population (2004)
  - Total: 300
- Time zone: UTC+3 (AST)
- City Qrya Pcode: C3286

Jeb Khsara (Arabic: جب خسارة) is a Syrian village located in Al-Saan Subdistrict in Salamiyah District, Hama. According to the Syria Central Bureau of Statistics (CBS), Jeb Khsara had a population of 300 in the 2004 census. As of 25 February 2025, Jeb Khsara is uninhabited, likely as a result of displacement due to the Syrian Civil War.
