= Shaykh Hilal =

Shaykh Hilal الشيخ هلال
- Village
- Location in Syria
- Coordinates: 35°14′58″N 37°30′18″E
- Country: Syria
- Governorate: Hama
- District: Salamiyah
- Subdistrict: Saan

Population (2004)
  - Total: 834
- Time zone: UTC+3 (AST)
- City Qrya Pcode: C3281

Shaykh Hilal (Arabic: الشيخ هلال, romanized: al-Shaykh Hilāl) is a village in central Syria administratively part of al-Saan Subdistrict of the Salamiyah District of the Hama Governorate. It is located 95 kilometers (59 mi) east of Hama and 55 kilometers (34 mi) north of Salamiyah. It is the center of the Shaykh Hilal Municipality, which also incorporates the neighboring villages and hamlets of Rasm Amun, Rasm al-Tina, Rawida, Hasu al-Qiblawi, Hanita and Maksar al-Janubi. As of 2009, all the village lands of Shaykh Hilal were owned by the municipality, with no private plots, though the local government signaled it was beginning the process of selling plots to the residents.

According to the Syria Central Bureau of Statistics (CBS), Shaykh Hilal had a population of 834 in the 2004 census. Around 1995 around half of the village's 1,200 inhabitants had emigrated due to the government ban that year on farming in the desert in its effort to counter desertification.

== History ==
The modern village of Sheikh Hilal was founded in the 1930s. Its original name was Rasm Shaykh Hilal, the earliest mention of which was in the 1890s. It was named for a local Bedouin sheikh.

== Beehive houses ==
The village is best known for its earthen beehive houses, of which there are over 140 with more than 300 domes (collectively). About three-quarters of the beehive houses are still inhabited by the villagers. The houses are considered a heritage site by Syria and in 2008–2009 the Friends of Salamiyah Association and the Swiss Agency for Development and Cooperation commenced a project to restore the domes. The project aimed to improve the livelihoods of the villagers and create new streams of income from heritage tourism. As of 2011, Shaykh Hilal had hosted about 650 foreign visitors to the beehive houses.

== Bibliography ==
- Aldbiyat, Mohammed (April 2013). Kawakibi, Salam (ed.). "A Tale of "Community-Civic" Work in Salamiyah: The Experience of "Friends of Salamiyah" Society" (PDF). Knowledge Programme Civil Society in West Asia. 2: 34–39.
