= Mrikb =

Mrikb مريقب
- Village
- Country: Syria
- Governorate: Hama
- District: Salamiyah District
- Subdistrict: Al-Saan Subdistrict

Population (2004)
  - Total: 57
- Time zone: UTC+3 (AST)
- City Qrya Pcode: N/A

Mrikb (Arabic: مريقب) is a Syrian village located in Al-Saan Subdistrict in Salamiyah District, Hama. According to the Syria Central Bureau of Statistics (CBS), Mrikb had a population of 57 in the 2004 census.
