= Al-Kafat =

Al-Kafat الكافات
- Village
- Location in Syria
- Coordinates: 35°4′4″N 36°53′19″E
- Country: Syria
- Governorate: Hama
- District: Salamiyah
- Subdistrict: Salamiyah

Population (2004)
  - Total: 1,893
- Time zone: UTC+3 (AST)
- City Qrya Pcode: C3258

Al-Kafat (Arabic: الكافات) is a Syrian village located in the Salamiyah Subdistrict of the Salamiyah District of the Hama Governorate. According to the Syria Central Bureau of Statistics (CBS), al-Kafat had a population of 1,893 in the 2004 census. Its inhabitants are predominantly Ismailis.

== History ==
Al-Kafat was founded in 1870 by Ismaili peasants from Akkar in modern-day northern Lebanon. They initially began farming in the area surrounding al-Kafat, but mostly lived in nearby Salamiyah, the center of Ismaili life in Syria. The Akkari Ismailis of Salamiyah were forced off their land in the mid-19th century on the orders of the Ismaili emir (prince) of the city, who gave the land confiscated from them to his relatives. Part of the Akkaris returned to Akkar, while others went on to eventually establish al-Kafat, which became a prosperous suburb of Salamiyah.
