= Khunayfis al-Dawsa =

Khneifis Eldosa خنيفس الدوسة
- Village
- Location in Syria
- Coordinates: 35.189671°N 37.119305°E
- Country: Syria
- Governorate: Hama
- District: Salamiyah District
- Subdistrict: Sabburah Subdistrict

Population (2004)
  - Total: 804
- Time zone: UTC+3 (AST)
- City Qrya Pcode: C3293

Khneifis Eldosa (Arabic: خنيفس الدوسة) is a Syrian village located in Sabburah Subdistrict in Salamiyah District, Hama. According to the Syria Central Bureau of Statistics (CBS), Khneifis Eldosa had a population of 804 in the 2004 census.
