= Shaykh Rih =

Sheikh Rih الشيخ ريح
- Village
- Location in Syria
- Coordinates: 34.924997°N 37.166934°E
- Country: Syria
- Governorate: Hama
- District: Salamiyah District
- Subdistrict: Salamiyah Subdistrict

Population (2004)
  - Total: 1,048
- Time zone: UTC+3 (AST)
- City Qrya Pcode: C3223

Sheikh Rih (Arabic: الشيخ ريح) is a Syrian village located in Salamiyah Subdistrict in Salamiyah District, Hama Governorate. According to the Syria Central Bureau of Statistics (CBS), Sheikh Rih had a population of 1,048 in the 2004 census. As of December 2025, the village had a population of 222.
