= Jadduah =

Jadduah جدوعة
- Village
- Location in Syria
- Coordinates: 35°8′19″N 37°11′0″E
- Country: Syria
- Governorate: Hama
- District: Salamiyah District
- Subdistrict: Sabburah Subdistrict

Population (2025)
  - Total: 1,851
- Time zone: UTC+3 (AST)
- City Qrya Pcode: C8765

Jadduah (Arabic: جدوعة) is a Syrian village located in Sabburah Subdistrict in Salamiyah District, Hama. According to the IOM, the village had a population of 1,851 (as of April 2025).
