= Bgheidid =

Coordinates: 35°17′7.8″N 37°27′46.7″E

Bgheidid بغيديد
- Village
- Location in Syria
- Country: Syria
- Governorate: Hama
- District: Salamiyah District
- Subdistrict: Al-Saan Subdistrict

Population (2004)
  - Total: 50
- Time zone: UTC+3 (AST)
- City Qrya Pcode: C3282

Bgheidid (Arabic: بغيديد) is a Syrian village located in Al-Saan Subdistrict in Salamiyah District, Hama. According to the Syria Central Bureau of Statistics (CBS), Bgheidid had a population of 50 in the 2004 census. According to the 1960 census, it had a population of 32.
