= Safawi, Hama =

Safawi, Hama صفاوي
- Village
- Location in Syria
- Coordinates: 34°57′34″N 37°5′30″E
- Country: Syria
- Governorate: Hama
- District: Salamiyah District
- Subdistrict: Salamiyah Subdistrict

Population (2004)
  - Total: 42
- Time zone: UTC+3 (AST)
- City Qrya Pcode: C3238

Safawi, Hama (Arabic: صفاوي) is a Syrian village located in Salamiyah Subdistrict in Salamiyah District, Hama. According to the Syria Central Bureau of Statistics (CBS), Safawi, Hama had a population of 42 in the 2004 census. Its inhabitants are predominantly Ismaili.
