= Suha =

Suha may refer to:

- Suha (given name), a Sanskrit or Arabic feminine given name. Meaning "Pakhi"

== Places ==
- Suha (Bratunac), a village in Bosnia and Herzegovina
- Suha, Živinice, a village in Bosnia and Herzegovina
- Suha, Iran, a village in Ardabil Province, Iran
- Suha (river), a river in Romania
- Suha, Škofja Loka, a village in Slovenia
- Suha, Syria, a village in the Hama Governorate of Syria

== Other ==
- SUHA (computer science), the simple uniform hashing assumption for hash tables
- "Suha", a song from Xiu Xiu's debut album Knife Play
