= Salam Gharbi =

Salam Garbi سلام غربي
- Village
- Location in Syria
- Coordinates: 34.953879°N 37.325149°E
- Country: Syria
- Governorate: Hama
- District: Salamiyah District
- Subdistrict: Barri Sharqi Subdistrict

Population (2004)
  - Total: 134
- Time zone: UTC+3 (AST)
- City Qrya Pcode: N/A

Salam Garbi (Arabic: سلام غربي) is a Syrian village located in Barri Sharqi Subdistrict in Salamiyah District, Hama. According to the Syria Central Bureau of Statistics (CBS), Salam Garbi had a population of 134 in the 2004 census.
