= Masud, Hama =

Masud, Hama مسعود
- Village
- Location in Syria
- Coordinates: 35.092752°N 37.368901°E
- Country: Syria
- Governorate: Hama
- District: Salamiyah District
- Subdistrict: Uqayribat Subdistrict

Population (2004)
  - Total: 1,625
- Time zone: UTC+3 (AST)
- City Qrya Pcode: C3333

Masud, Hama (Arabic: مسعود) is a Syrian village located in Uqayribat Subdistrict in Salamiyah District, Hama. According to the Syria Central Bureau of Statistics (CBS), Masud, Hama had a population of 1,625 in the 2004 census.
