= Tell Jadid =

Tell Jadid تل جديد
- Village
- Location in Syria
- Coordinates: 34°55′38″N 37°14′50″E
- Country: Syria
- Governorate: Hama
- District: Salamiyah District
- Subdistrict: Barri Sharqi Subdistrict

Population (2004)
  - Total: 1,230
- Time zone: UTC+3 (AST)
- City Qrya Pcode: C3267

Tell Jadid (Arabic: تل جديد) is a Syrian village located in Barri Sharqi Subdistrict in Salamiyah District, Hama. According to the Syria Central Bureau of Statistics (CBS), Tell Jadid had a population of 1,230 in the 2004 census. Its inhabitants predominantly Alawite and Ismaili Muslims, but there is also a sizable Sunni Muslim Bedouin community.
