= Tabara Elhamra =

Tabara Elhamra تبارة الحمراء
- Village
- Location in Syria
- Coordinates: 35°0′43″N 37°36′52″E
- Country: Syria
- Governorate: Hama
- District: Salamiyah District
- Subdistrict: Uqayribat Subdistrict

Population (2004)
  - Total: 256
- Time zone: UTC+3 (AST)
- City Qrya Pcode: C3328

Tabara Elhamra (Arabic: تبارة الحمراء) is a Syrian village located in Uqayribat Subdistrict in Salamiyah District, Hama. According to the Syria Central Bureau of Statistics (CBS), Tabara Elhamra had a population of 256 in the 2004 census.
