= Al-Khurayjah =

Khreijeh الخريجة
- Village
- Location in Syria
- Coordinates: 34.962820°N 37.355539°E
- Country: Syria
- Governorate: Hama
- District: Salamiyah District
- Subdistrict: Barri Sharqi Subdistrict

Population (2004)
  - Total: 142
- Time zone: UTC+3 (AST)
- City Qrya Pcode: C3259

Khreijeh (Arabic: الخريجة) is a Syrian village located in Barri Sharqi Subdistrict in Salamiyah District, Hama. According to the Syria Central Bureau of Statistics (CBS), Khreijeh had a population of 142 in the 2004 census.
