= Al-Swaia =

Al-Swaia الصواية
- Village
- Country: Syria
- Governorate: Hama
- District: Salamiyah District
- Subdistrict: Al-Saan Subdistrict

Population (2004)
  - Total: 68
- Time zone: UTC+3 (AST)
- City Qrya Pcode: N/A

Al-Swaia (Arabic: الصواية) is a Syrian village located in Al-Saan Subdistrict in Salamiyah District, Hama. According to the Syria Central Bureau of Statistics (CBS), Al-Swaia had a population of 68 in the 2004 census.
