= Umm Mil =

Um Mil أم ميل
- Village
- Location in Syria
- Coordinates: 34.996038°N 37.301856°E
- Country: Syria
- Governorate: Hama
- District: Salamiyah District
- Subdistrict: Barri Sharqi Subdistrict

Population (2004)
  - Total: 118
- Time zone: UTC+3 (AST)
- City Qrya Pcode: C3269

Um Mil (Arabic: أم ميل) is a Syrian village located in Barri Sharqi Subdistrict in Salamiyah District, Hama. According to the Syria Central Bureau of Statistics (CBS), Um Mil had a population of 118 in the 2004 census.
