= Marj Mattar =

Marj Mattar مرج مطر
- Village
- Location in Syria
- Country: Syria
- Governorate: Hama
- District: Salamiyah District
- Subdistrict: Salamiyah Subdistrict

Population (2004)
  - Total: 1,255
- Time zone: UTC+3 (AST)
- City Qrya Pcode: C3251

Marj Mattar (Arabic: مرج مطر) is a Syrian village located in Salamiyah Subdistrict in Salamiyah District, Hama. According to the Syria Central Bureau of Statistics (CBS), Marj Mattar had a population of 1,255 in the 2004 census.
