= Jeb Dkileh =

Jeb Dkileh جب دكيلة
- Village
- Location in Syria
- Coordinates: 35°9′31″N 37°22′40″E
- Country: Syria
- Governorate: Hama
- District: Salamiyah District
- Subdistrict: Uqayribat Subdistrict

Population (2004)
  - Total: 200
- Time zone: UTC+3 (AST)
- City Qrya Pcode: C3318

Jeb Dkileh (Arabic: جب دكيلة) is a Syrian village located in Uqayribat Subdistrict in Salamiyah District, Hama. According to the Syria Central Bureau of Statistics (CBS), Jeb Dkileh had a population of 200 in the 2004 census. As of 8 June 2025, the village had a population of 212, all but 6 of whom were recently returned refugees and IDPs.
