= Sheykh Ali Mahalleh =

Sheykh Ali Mahalleh (Persian: شيخ علي محله) may refer to:

- Sheykh Ali Mahalleh, Gilan
- Sheykh Ali Mahalleh, Mazandaran
