= Abu Hakfa =

Abu Hakfa أبو حكفة
- Village
- Location in Syria
- Coordinates: 35°10′N 37°32′E
- Country: Syria
- Governorate: Hama
- District: Salamiyah District
- Subdistrict: Uqayribat Subdistrict

Population (2004)
  - Total: 250
- Time zone: UTC+3 (AST)
- City Qrya Pcode: C3323

Abu Hakfa (Arabic: أبو حكفة) is a Syrian village located in Uqayribat Subdistrict in Salamiyah District, Hama. According to the Syria Central Bureau of Statistics (CBS), Abu Hakfa had a population of 250 in the 2004 census.

The settlement is currently uninhabited, its inhabitants having been displaced by the Syrian Civil War.
