= Tehmaz =

Tehmaz طهماز
- Village
- Location in Syria
- Coordinates: 35°8′2″N 37°38′56″E
- Country: Syria
- Governorate: Hama
- District: Salamiyah District
- Subdistrict: Uqayribat Subdistrict

Population (2004)
  - Total: 432
- Time zone: UTC+3 (AST)
- City Qrya Pcode: C3320

Tehmaz (Arabic: طهماز) is a Syrian village located in Uqayribat Subdistrict in Salamiyah District, Hama. According to the Syria Central Bureau of Statistics (CBS), Tehmaz had a population of 432 in the 2004 census.
