= Smakh =

Smakh صماخ
- Village
- Location in Syria
- Coordinates: 35°5′36″N 36°53′52″E
- Country: Syria
- Governorate: Hama
- District: Salamiyah District
- Subdistrict: Salamiyah Subdistrict
- Time zone: UTC+3 (AST)

Smakh (Arabic: صماخ) is a Syrian village located in Salamiyah Subdistrict in Salamiyah District, Hama.
