= Abul Fashafish =

Abul Fashafish أبو الفشافيش
- Village
- Location in Syria
- Coordinates: 35°9′8″N 37°34′41″E
- Country: Syria
- Governorate: Hama
- District: Salamiyah District
- Subdistrict: Uqayribat Subdistrict

Population (2004)
  - Total: 480
- Time zone: UTC+3 (AST)
- City Qrya Pcode: C3311

Abul Fashafish (Arabic: أبو الفشافيش) is a Syrian village located in Uqayribat Subdistrict in Salamiyah District, Hama. According to the Syria Central Bureau of Statistics (CBS), Abul Fashafish had a population of 480 in the 2004 census.
