= Qablahat =

Qablahat قبلهات
- Village
- Location in Syria
- Coordinates: 34°55′22″N 37°5′23″E
- Country: Syria
- Governorate: Hama
- District: Salamiyah District
- Subdistrict: Salamiyah Subdistrict

Population (2004)
  - Total: 1,138
- Time zone: UTC+3 (AST)
- City Qrya Pcode: C3257

Qablahat (Arabic: قبلهات, romanized: Kāblāhāt) is a Syrian village located in Salamiyah Subdistrict in Salamiyah District, Hama. According to the Syria Central Bureau of Statistics (CBS), Qablahat had a population of 1,138 in the 2004 census.
