= Furaytan =

Fritan فريتان
- Village
- Location in Syria
- Coordinates: 34.950857°N 37.244312°E
- Country: Syria
- Governorate: Hama
- District: Salamiyah District
- Subdistrict: Barri Sharqi Subdistrict

Population (2004)
  - Total: 186
- Time zone: UTC+3 (AST)
- City Qrya Pcode: C3271

Fritan (Arabic: فريتان) is a Syrian village located in Barri Sharqi Subdistrict in Salamiyah District, Hama. According to the Syria Central Bureau of Statistics (CBS), the village had a population of 186 in the 2004 census.
