= Mweileh =

Mweileh مويلح
- Village
- Country: Syria
- Governorate: Hama
- District: Salamiyah District
- Subdistrict: Al-Saan Subdistrict

Population (2004)
  - Total: 225
- Time zone: UTC+3 (AST)
- City Qrya Pcode: N/A

Mweileh (Arabic: مويلح) is a Syrian village located in Al-Saan Subdistrict in Salamiyah District, Hama. According to the Syria Central Bureau of Statistics (CBS), Mweileh had a population of 225 in the 2004 census.
