= Al-Ghawi =

Ghawi الغاوي
- Village
- Location in Syria
- Coordinates: 34.958902°N 37.120408°E
- Country: Syria
- Governorate: Hama
- District: Salamiyah District
- Subdistrict: Salamiyah Subdistrict

Population (2004)
  - Total: 941
- Time zone: UTC+3 (AST)
- City Qrya Pcode: C3234

Ghawi (Arabic: الغاوي) is a Syrian village located in Salamiyah Subdistrict in Salamiyah District, Hama. According to the Syria Central Bureau of Statistics (CBS), Ghawi had a population of 941 in the 2004 census.
