= Halban =

Halban may refer to the following sites in the Middle East:

- Halban, Hama, an archaeological site and village in central Syria
- Halban, Idlib, a village in northwestern Syria
- Halban, Oman, a village in Oman.
