= Abu Hreik =

Abu Hreik أبو حريق
- Village
- Location in Syria
- Coordinates: 35.2792°N 37.2575°E
- Country: Syria
- Governorate: Hama
- District: Salamiyah District
- Subdistrict: Al-Saan Subdistrict

Population (2004)
  - Total: 533
- Time zone: UTC+3 (AST)
- City Qrya Pcode: C3277

Abu Hreik (Arabic: أبو حريق) is a Syrian village located in Al-Saan Subdistrict in Salamiyah District, Hama. According to the Syria Central Bureau of Statistics (CBS), Abu Hreik had a population of 533 in the 2004 census. Abu Hreik was captured by SAA on 22 January 2018 from ISIS during the Northwestern Syria offensive.
