= Makhbuta =

Makhbuta المخبوطة
- Village
- Location in Syria
- Coordinates: 34°57′56″N 37°31′41″E
- Country: Syria
- Governorate: Hama
- District: Salamiyah District
- Subdistrict: Uqayribat Subdistrict

Population (2004)
  - Total: 220
- Time zone: UTC+3 (AST)
- City Qrya Pcode: C3312

Makhbuta (Arabic: المخبوطة) is a Syrian village located in Uqayribat Subdistrict in Salamiyah District, Hama. According to the Syria Central Bureau of Statistics (CBS), Makhbuta had a population of 220 in the 2004 census.
