= Awja–Qabasin al-Arab =

Coordinates: 35°16′27″N 37°19′41″E

Ojet - Kabasin Elarab عوجة كباسين العرب
- Village
- Location in Syria
- Country: Syria
- Governorate: Hama
- District: Salamiyah District
- Subdistrict: Al-Saan Subdistrict

Population (2004)
  - Total: 79
- Time zone: UTC+3 (AST)
- City Qrya Pcode: C3283

Ojet - Kabasin Elarab (Arabic: عوجة كباسين العرب) is a Syrian village located in Al-Saan Subdistrict in Salamiyah District, Hama. According to the Syria Central Bureau of Statistics (CBS), Ojet - Kabasin Elarab had a population of 79 in the 2004 census.
