= Tirado =

Tirado is a surname and a given name of Castilian origin. The Tirado lineage has its roots in the mountains of León, where the earliest manor or casa solar is found. During the Reconquista, branches of Tirado spread to New Castile (La Mancha), Extremadura (Cáceres), Valencia (Castellón) and Andalusia (Huelva), wherefrom it passed to the Americas. Notable people with the name include:

Surname:

- Adriana Tirado (born 1998), Puerto Rican footballer
- Alfonso Ortiz Tirado (1893–1960), opera singer and doctor of medicine from Álamos (Sonora), Mexico
- Amílcar Tirado (1922–2004), Puerto Rican filmmaker
- Ángel Buendía Tirado (born 1951), Mexican economist and politician affiliated with the Institutional Revolutionary Party
- Cándido Tirado (born 1955), Puerto Rican playwright based in New York City
- Carlos J. Tirado Yepes (born 1964), Venezuelan artist, painter and sculptor in Florida, United States
- Cirilo Tirado Delgado (1938–2025), Puerto Rican politician and attorney
- Cirilo Tirado Rivera (born 1964), Puerto Rican politician and Senator, son of Cirilo Tirado Delgado
- Domingo Tirado Benedí (1898–1971), Spanish-born educator
- Edgar Hernando Tirado Mazo (born 1939), Colombian Roman Catholic prelate
- Fabio Betancur Tirado (1938–2011), archbishop of the Roman Catholic Archdiocese of Manizales (Caldas), Colombia
- Fernando Tirado Soto (born 1953), Chilean legislator
- Filipo Tirado (born 1949), Puerto Rican puppeteer
- Francisco Sutil Tirado (born 1984), Spanish professional footballer
- Jacob Tirado (1540–1620), merchant and shipowner, one of the founders of the Spanish-Portuguese community of Amsterdam, Netherlands
- Jeannie Tirado (born 1990), American voice actress
- Jesús Tirado (born 1948), Puerto Rican sports shooter
- Juan Cortada Tirado (1864–1937), Puerto Rican politician, businessman, and landowner
- Linda Tirado (born c. 1981), American author and activist
- Luis Tirado (1906–1964), Chilean former football player and team manager
- Miguel Ángel Tirado (born 1949), Spanish comedian, better known by his comedic persona Marianico el Corto
- Nelida Tirado (born 1971), American flamenco dancer based in New York City
- Reyna Tirado Gálvez (born 1982), Mexican politician from the Institutional Revolutionary Party
- Romualdo Tirado (1880–1963), stage actor and theater impresario with a prolific career in Spanish language films produced in Hollywood
- Teodoro José Tirado García (born 1985), known as Teo, Spanish professional footballer
- Tony Tirado, Peruvian sports commentator and former football goalkeeper in the North American Soccer League

Given name:

- Anthony Tirado Chase (born 1961), American professor of international relations and human rights

== See also ==
- Tirad
- Tiradito
- Tirando
- Trado
