= Qastal, Hama =

Qastal, Hama القسطل
- Village
- Location in Syria
- Coordinates: 35.073224°N 37.594866°E
- Country: Syria
- Governorate: Hama
- District: Salamiyah District
- Subdistrict: Uqayribat Subdistrict

Population (2004)
  - Total: 1,919
- Time zone: UTC+3 (AST)
- City Qrya Pcode: C3322

Qastal, Hama (Arabic: القسطل) is a Syrian village located in Uqayribat Subdistrict in Salamiyah District, Hama. According to the Syria Central Bureau of Statistics (CBS), Qastal, Hama had a population of 1,919 in the 2004 census.
