= Halban, Hama =

Halban حلبان
- Village
- Location in Syria
- Coordinates: 35.235875°N 37.010450°E
- Country: Syria
- Governorate: Hama
- District: Salamiyah
- Subdistrict: Salamiyah

Population (2004)
  - Total: 653
- Time zone: UTC+3 (AST)
- City Qrya Pcode: C3248

Halban (Arabic: حلبان) is a village in central Syria, administratively part of the Salamiyah District of the Hama Governorate, located about 30 kilometers (19 mi) north of Salamiyah. According to the Syria Central Bureau of Statistics (CBS), Halban had a population of 653 in the 2004 census.

== History ==
=== Byzantine period ===
Halban is one of several Byzantine-era villages in the al-A'la plateau east of Hama. It contains considerable remains, mainly basaltic building blocks reused in more modern constructions. Several basaltic lintels with Greek inscriptions were found in the village during archaeological expeditions in 1904–1905. The earliest dated to 362 CE. Another inscription dated to 534. On the east side of Halban, facing the desert steppe, stood a defensive tower with an inscription dating it to 543 and crediting local stone masons Ioannes and Symeones. The builders were noted as natives of 'Holbanoi', the ancient name of Halban.

=== Modern period ===
The modern village of Halban was founded c. 1900. The village was owned by a landlord and the inhabitants were tenant farmers until the 1958 Land Reform Laws which redistributed its lands to the residents.

As of 2023, agriculture and livestock raising remained the mainstay of the village economy, with the main crops being olives, pistachios, cumin, grapes, almonds, chickpeas and grain. Education levels were relatively high and a relatively large number of residents had professional careers in law, engineering, education and pharmaceauticals.

== Bibliography ==
- Prentice, William Kelly (1922). Syria: Publications of the Princeton University Archaeological Expeditions to Syria in 1904-5 and 1909. Leiden: E. J. Brill.
