= Abu Hanaya =

Abu Hanaya أبو حنايا
- Village
- Location in Syria
- Coordinates: 35.071944°N 37.326111°E
- Country: Syria
- Governorate: Hama
- District: Salamiyah District
- Subdistrict: Barri Sharqi Subdistrict

Population (2004)
  - Total: 1,157
- Time zone: UTC+3 (AST)
- City Qrya Pcode: C3262

Abu Hanaya (Arabic: أبو حنايا) is a Syrian village located in Barri Sharqi Subdistrict in Salamiyah District, Hama. According to the Syria Central Bureau of Statistics (CBS), Abu Hanaya had a population of 1157 in the 2004 census.
