= Al-Uyur =

al-Uyur العيور
- Village
- Location in Syria
- Coordinates: 35.164354°N 36.909793°E
- Country: Syria
- Governorate: Hama
- District: Salamiyah
- Subdistrict: Salamiyah

Population (2004)
  - Total: 843
- Time zone: UTC+3 (AST)
- City Qrya Pcode: C3235

Al-Uyur (Arabic: العيور) is a village in central Syria, administratively part of the Salamiyah District of the Hama Governorate. According to the Syria Central Bureau of Statistics (CBS), al-Uyur had a population of 843 in the 2004 census.
