= Salba, Salamiyah =

Salba صلبا
- Village
- Location in Syria
- Coordinates: 35.116977°N 37.343817°E
- Country: Syria
- Governorate: Hama
- District: Salamiyah District
- Subdistrict: Sabburah Nahiyah

Population (2004)
  - Total: 556
- Time zone: UTC+3 (AST)
- City Qrya Pcode: C3306

Salba (Arabic: صلبا) is a Syrian village located in Sabburah Nahiyah in Salamiyah District, Hama. According to the Syria Central Bureau of Statistics (CBS), Salba had a population of 556 in the 2004 census. Its inhabitants are predominantly Ismaili.
