= Mabujah =

Mabujah المبعوجة
- Village
- Location in Syria
- Coordinates: 35°07′50.7″N 37°16′30.7″E
- Country: Syria
- Governorate: Hama
- District: Salamiyah
- Subdistrict: Sabburah

Population (2004)
  - Total: 2,929
- Time zone: UTC+3 (AST)
- City Qrya Pcode: C3308

Mabujah (Arabic: المبعوجة also spelled Mabuja, Mabouja, Mabouga, Mabujeh or Al Mab`ujah) is a village in central Syria located in the Sabburah Subdistrict of the Salamiyah District in Hama Governorate. According to the Syria Central Bureau of Statistics (CBS), Mabujah had a population of 2,929 in the 2004 census. A majority of the village's inhabitants are Ismailis, but there are also significant communities of Alawite and Sunni Muslims.

During the ongoing Syrian Civil War, on 31 March 2015, fighters from the Islamic State attacked the village and murdered from 37 to 44 of its inhabitants, before being repelled by Syrian Arab Army forces hours later. Those killed came from all of the village's religious sects and included whole families. According to a member of the Syrian military, the attack was part of ISIS's efforts to advance toward the cities of Hama and Homs via the Syrian Desert.
