= Hama and Homs offensive (March–April 2015) =

Syrian Civil War battle

- Part of the Syrian Civil War
Date	20 March – 9 April 2015 (2 weeks and 6 days)
Location	Hama Governorate & Homs Governorate, Syria
Result	Indecisive

Belligerents
Islamic State of Iraq and the Levant: Military of ISIL	(Syria) Syrian Arab Republic: Syrian Armed Forces; National Defense Force

Commanders and leaders
Abu Ali al-Anbari (Deputy, Syria)	Brig. Gen. Yahya Baawish

Casualties and losses
60–100 killed (Syrian Army claim)	142 killed, some missing
- 48–50 civilians killed by ISIL (46–48 executed)

The Hama and Homs offensive (March–April 2015) during the Syrian Civil War was launched by the Islamic State of Iraq and the Levant (ISIL) in an attempt to cut the government supply line between its troops in central and northern Syria.

== The offensive ==
ISIL launched a two-pronged offensive in the eastern rural areas of Hama and Homs provinces on 20 March 2015, in an attempt to cut the main government supply line linking Aleppo, Khanasir, Salamiyah and Hama with each other. It was also speculated the aim of the assault was to raise morale after losses to Kurdish forces in the northeast of the country, especially during the Siege of Kobanî. After three days of fighting, during which ISIL stormed several military checkpoints, 20 soldiers were killed in Homs, while 74 soldiers died in Hama and a number of others were missing.

Early on 23 March, the jihadists attacked the military airport in Tadmur, in Homs province, and reportedly shot down a Syrian Arab Air Force Sukhoi Su-24 attack aircraft.

On 31 March, Islamic State militants killed 46–48 civilians in the village of Mabuja, in Hama province, before the Army managed to repel their attack. The subsequent fighting also left 31 soldiers and reportedly 40 militants dead. Six of the NDF soldiers were executed. The victims were either shot dead, burned or stabbed. 50 other civilians were kidnapped by ISIL from the village.

On 5 April, ISIL restarted its offensive by attacking four villages in the Salamiyah District of Hama, but reportedly did not manage to gain any significant ground. Two civilians were killed due to ISIL shelling. By 7 April, after two days of continues fighting, the ISIL assault was repelled. Still, on 9 April, ISIL attacked the al-Tababir and Hannorah checkpoints, in the east of the al-Froqlos area of Homs province, leaving 17 soldiers dead, three of whom were beheaded.

== See also ==
- Palmyra offensive (2015)
- Qalamoun offensive (May 2015)
- Battle of Yarmouk Camp (2015)
- Al-Hasakah offensive (February–March 2015)
- List of wars and battles involving ISIL
