= Danin, Hama =

Danin, Hama دنين
- Village
- Location in Syria
- Coordinates: 35°13′N 36°55′E
- Country: Syria
- Governorate: Hama
- District: Salamiyah District
- Subdistrict: Salamiyah Subdistrict

Population (2004)
  - Total: 666
- Time zone: UTC+3 (AST)
- City Qrya Pcode: C3217

Danin, Hama (Arabic: دنين) is a Syrian village located in Salamiyah Subdistrict in Salamiyah District, Hama. According to the Syria Central Bureau of Statistics (CBS), Danin, Hama had a population of 666 in the 2004 census.
