= Álvaro Tirado Mejía =

Colombian historian, academic and diplomat (born 1940)

Álvaro Tirado Mejía (Note: In this Hispanic American name, the first or paternal surname is Tirado and the second or maternal family name is Mejía.) (born 10 December 1940) is a Colombian historian, academic and diplomat. He is known for his influential work on Colombian political and economic history and for his involvement in international human rights institutions.

== Career ==
Álvaro Tirado Mejía was born in Medellín, Antioquia, on 10 December 1940. He studied law and political science at the University of Antioquia in Medellín, where he graduated in 1968. He also earned a PhD in history from the University of Paris I in 1975. He has taught at the Latin American Autonomous University (UNAULA), the National University of Colombia and the University of the Andes, and has written numerous books on Colombia's politics, economic history and social issues.

Tirado Mejía was elected to the Inter-American Human Rights Commission, the human rights arm of the Organization of American States (OAS), for the 1992–1995 term and served as its president in 1995. He served as ambassador to Switzerland from May 1992 to January 1995 and as permanent representative to the OAS from February 2005 to August 2006. He was also a member of the United Nations Committee on Economic, Social and Cultural Rights (CESCR) from 2003 to 2010.

== Publications ==
Tirado Mejía's published books include:

- Introducción a la historia económica de Colombia. Bogotá: Universidad Nacional de Colombia, 1971. ISBN 978-9587148756
- Hacia una concepción global de los derechos humanos. Bogotá: CEREC, 1990. ISBN 978-9589061374
- Colombia en la OEA. Bogotá: Ministerio de Relaciones Exteriores, 1998. ISBN 978-9589620182
- Integración y democracia en América Latina y el Caribe. Buenos Aires: Intal, 1997. ISBN 978-9507380655

== Honours and awards ==
- Officer of the Legion of Honour, France
