= Nawa, Salamiyah =

Nawa نوى
- Village
- Location in Syria
- Coordinates: 35.198307°N 37.058859°E
- Country: Syria
- Governorate: Hama
- District: Salamiyah
- Subdistrict: Salamiyah

Population (2004)
  - Total: 441
- Time zone: UTC+3 (AST)
- City Qrya Pcode: C3255

Nawa (Arabic: نوى) is a village in central Syria, administratively part of the Salamiyah District of the Hama Governorate. It is located 27 kilometers (17 mi) north of Salamiyah. According to the Syria Central Bureau of Statistics (CBS), Nawa had a population of 441 in the 2004 census. Its inhabitants are predominantly Alawites.

== History ==
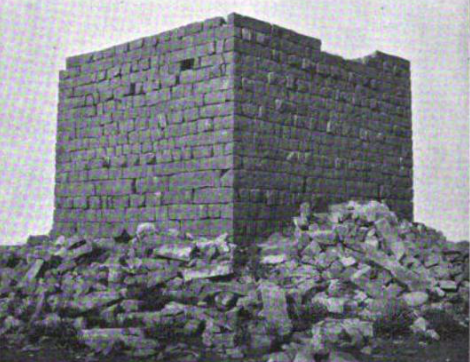
The Nawa monastery tower, 1904–1905

Nawa is one of several Byzantine villages on the al-A'la plateau between Hama and Salamiyah. It contains several ruins, including basaltic lintels inscribed in Greek and a basaltic stone monastery with a church dating to 598 CE.

The modern village was founded in the 1870s, during Ottoman rule (1516–1918) by Alawite refugees. A school was established in Nawa in 1965 but not completed until 1974 and expanded in 2007. Otherwise, the village lacks most services and key infrastructure, including paved roads, telephone landlines, and suitable water wells. About four-fifths of the village's labor force works in agriculture.

== Bibliography ==
- Foss, Clive (1997). "Syria in Transition, A. D. 550–750: An Archaeological Approach". Dumbarton Oaks Papers. 51: 189–269. doi:10.2307/1291765. JSTOR 1291765.
