= Msheirfeh =

Msheirfeh مشيرفة
- Village
- Location in Syria
- Coordinates: 35.020418°N 37.523798°E
- Country: Syria
- Governorate: Hama
- District: Salamiyah District
- Subdistrict: Uqayribat Subdistrict

Population (2004)o
  - Total: 307
- Time zone: UTC+3 (AST)
- City Qrya Pcode: C3332

Msheirfeh (Arabic: مشيرفة) is a Syrian village located in Uqayribat Subdistrict in Salamiyah District, Hama. According to the Syria Central Bureau of Statistics (CBS), Msheirfeh had a population of 307 in the 2004 census.
