= Tell Dahab, Hama =

Tell Dahab تل ذهب
- Village
- Location in Syria
- Coordinates: 35.211422°N 37.019677°E
- Country: Syria
- Governorate: Hama
- District: Salamiyah District
- Subdistrict: Salamiyah Subdistrict

Population (2004)
  - Total: 660
- Time zone: UTC+3 (AST)
- City Qrya Pcode: C3212

Tell Dahab (Arabic: تل ذهب) is a village in central Syria, administratively part of the Salamiyah District of Hama Governorate. According to the Syria Central Bureau of Statistics (CBS), Tell Dahab had a population of 660 in the 2004 census.

== History ==
Tell Dahab is one of several villages on the al-A'la plateau to contain Byzantine-era ruins. Greek inscriptions found on basalt lintels in the village date to 470, 489, 570 and 589 CE. In 1838, Tell Dahab's inhabitants were noted to be predominantly Sunni Muslims.

On 1 February 2025, as part of increasing violence against ethnic and religious minorities shortly after the fall of the Assad regime, the UK-based Syrian Observatory for Human Rights alleged that four civilians were shot dead in a summary execution in the village. By 11 February 2025, roughly 60% of the pre-Deterrence of Aggression population had fled the settlement, though it is unclear whether the exodus occurred before or after the killings.

== Bibliography ==
- Foss, Clive (1997). "Syria in Transition, A. D. 550–750: An Archaeological Approach". Dumbarton Oaks Papers. 51: 189–269. doi:10.2307/1291765.
- Robinson, E.; Smith, E. (1841). Biblical Researches in Palestine, Mount Sinai and Arabia Petraea: A Journal of Travels in the year 1838. Vol. 3. Boston: Crocker & Brewster.
