= Tell al-Tut =

Tell al-Tut تل التوت
- Village
- Location in Syria
- Coordinates: 34°59′26″N 37°9′50″E
- Country: Syria
- Governorate: Hama
- District: Salamiyah
- Subdistrict: Barri Sharqi

Population (2004)
  - Total: 1,923
- Time zone: UTC+3 (AST)
- City Qrya Pcode: C3265

Tell al-Tut (Arabic: تل التوت) is a village in central Syria, administratively part of the Barri Sharqi Subdistrict of the Salamiyah District of the Hama Governorate. It is located 45 kilometers (28 mi) east of Hama and 10 kilometers (6.2 mi) east of Salamiyah. According to the Syria Central Bureau of Statistics (CBS), Tell al-Tut had a population of 1,923 in the 2004 census. The population is religiously mixed and includes an Ismaili community.

== History ==
=== Ottoman period ===
Modern Tell al-Tut was founded in 1891 by the al-Hajj and Dahhak families, who owned property in the nearby area of Shaykh Ali. Their respective patriarchs, Hassan al-Hajj and Ali al-Dahhak, found their lands in Shaykh Ali to be insufficient for their growing clans and settled in the ruins of Tell al-Tut. The first homes were mud huts with conical-shaped domes. The founders were soon after joined the families of Al Hassan Yousef, Al Sheikh Hassan Awad and al-Dawa, who helped restore the village's irrigation canals. However, the Office of Souls, which gives the boxes on the family book based on foot. He says that al Dahhak was the first to arrive, then Abdo and then Sheikh Hassan Awwad The village received many displaced people from Homs and Hama at the beginning of the Syrian revolution.

=== Modern period ===
As of 2009, Tell al-Tut was economically dependent on rainfed agriculture, mainly the cultivation of olives and grapevines, especially the latter. It was also a summer resort village for the inhabitants of Salamiyah, attracted to the village's large forest and olive groves.
