= Rasm Elabed =

Rasm Elabed رسم العبد
- Village
- Location in Syria
- Coordinates: 34°58′40″N 37°25′28″E
- Country: Syria
- Governorate: Hama
- District: Salamiyah District
- Subdistrict: Uqayribat Subdistrict

Population (2004)
  - Total: 404
- Time zone: UTC+3 (AST)
- City Qrya Pcode: C3317

Rasm Elabed (Arabic: رسم العبد) is a Syrian village located in Uqayribat Subdistrict in Salamiyah District, Hama. According to the Syria Central Bureau of Statistics (CBS), Rasm Elabed had a population of 404 in the 2004 census.
