= Zabada =

Zabada زبادة Zubbudeh
- Village
- Location in Syria
- Coordinates: 35.068915°N 36.809349°E
- Country: Syria
- Governorate: Hama
- District: Hama
- Subdistrict: Hama

Population (2004)
  - Total: 753
- Time zone: UTC+3 (AST)
- City Qrya Pcode: C2979

Zabada (Arabic: زبادة; also transliterated Zabbudeh) is a village in central Syria, administratively part of the Hama Governorate. According to the Syria Central Bureau of Statistics (CBS), Zabada had a population of 753 in the 2004 census.

== History ==
Zabada is one of several villages on the al-A'la plateau to contain Byzantine-era remains, largely re-used in modern building constructions. Three basaltic lintels have been discovered in these remains with Greek inscriptions dating to 586, 590 and 592 CE.

== Bibliography ==
- Foss, Clive (1997). "Syria in Transition, A. D. 550–750: An Archaeological Approach". Dumbarton Oaks Papers. 51: 189–269. doi:10.2307/1291765.
