= Tirad =

Trad, Hama طراد
- Village
- Location in Syria
- Coordinates: 35°09′N 36°58′E
- Country: Syria
- Governorate: Hama
- District: Salamiyah District
- Subdistrict: Salamiyah Subdistrict

Population (2004)
  - Total: 736
- Time zone: UTC+3 (AST)
- City Qrya Pcode: C3245

Trad, Hama (Arabic: طراد) is a Syrian village located in Salamiyah Subdistrict in Salamiyah District, Hama. According to the Syria Central Bureau of Statistics (CBS), Trad, Hama had a population of 736 in the 2004 census. Its inhabitants are predominantly Alawites.
