= Mohamed Khaddor =

- محمد خضور
- Born: January 13, 1976 (age 50); Latakia, Syria
- Military career
- Allegiance: Ba'athist Syria
- Branch: Republican Guard
- Service years: –2024
- Rank: Major General
- Conflicts: Battle of Aleppo (2012–2016); Siege of Deir ez-Zor; Central Syria campaign

Mohamed Ibrahim Khaddor (born 13 January 1976) is a former Syrian Major General in the Syrian Arab Army, known for his role in suppressing early protests in Douma during the 2011 civil uprising while serving as the commander of the 106th Republican Guard Brigade with the rank of Brigadier General.

== Career ==
In mid-2012, the 106th Republican Guard Brigade, led by Khaddor, was deployed to Aleppo, and he was appointed head of the Military and Security Committee in Aleppo on 29 November 2012.

The Syrian opposition accuses him of committing serious human rights violations, and Human Rights Watch published a report on 15 December 2011, naming him as directly responsible for acts of violence in Douma, east of Damascus.

He is on the sanctions list of the European Union, the United Kingdom, and other countries.
