= Sabba =

Sabba سباع
- Village
- Location in Syria
- Coordinates: 35°09′N 37°01′E
- Country: Syria
- Governorate: Hama
- District: Salamiyah District
- Subdistrict: Salamiyah Subdistrict

Population (2004)
  - Total: 791
- Time zone: UTC+3 (AST)
- City Qrya Pcode: C3213

Sabba or Sbaa (Arabic: سباع) is a village located in Salamiyah Subdistrict in Salamiyah District, Hama, Syria. According to the Syria Central Bureau of Statistics (CBS), Sabba had a population of 791 in the 2004 census.
