= Umm Haratayn, Hama =

Umm Haratayn أم حارتين
- Village
- Location in Syria
- Coordinates: 35°23′13″N 36°51′40″E
- Country: Syria
- Governorate: Hama
- District: Hama
- Subdistrict: Suran

Population (2004)
  - Total: 528
- Time zone: UTC+3 (AST)
- City Qrya Pcode: C3018

Umm Haratayn (Arabic: أم حارتين; also transliterated Umm Hartein or Umm Harteyn) is a village in central Syria, administratively part of the Suran Subdistrict of Hama District. According to the Syria Central Bureau of Statistics (CBS), Umm Haratayn had a population of 528 in the 2004 census. The inhabitants of Umm Haratayn are Alawites.

== History ==
Umm Haratayn is one of several villages on the al-A'la plateau to contain Byzantine-era ruins, namely a rectangular citadel with towers on its corners.

In the late 19th century, the village was owned by the Bani Khalid tribe, which sold it to the Kaylani family of Hama in 1890. The inhabitants were Alawite tenant farmers who settled in the village in the 1920s or early 1930s at the initiative of its Hama landlords to cultivate its lands.

== Bibliography ==
- Comité de l'Asie française (April 1933). "Notes sur la propriété foncière dans le Syrie centrale (Notes on Landownership in Central Syria)". Bulletin du Comité de l'Asie française (in French). 33 (309). Comité de l'Asie française: 131–133.
- Foss, Clive (1997). "Syria in Transition, A. D. 550–750: An Archaeological Approach". Dumbarton Oaks Papers. 51: 189–269. doi:10.2307/1291765.
