= Suha, Syria =

Suha سوحا
- Village
- Location in Syria
- Coordinates: 35°00′N 37°25′E
- Country: Syria
- Governorate: Hama
- District: Salamiyah
- Subdistrict: Uqayribat

Population (2004)
  - Total: 2,232
- Time zone: UTC+3 (AST)
- City Qrya Pcode: C3327

Suha (Arabic: سوحا) is a village in central Syria, administratively part of the Uqayribat Subdistrict of the Salamiyah District of the Hama Governorate. It is located 70 kilometers (43 mi) east of Hama and 35 kilometers (22 mi) northeast of Salamiyah. According to the Syria Central Bureau of Statistics (CBS), Suha had a population of 2,232 in the 2004 census.
