= Al-Saan =

Al-Sa'an السعن Sa'n al-Shajara
- Town
- Location in Syria
- Coordinates: 35°15′51″N 37°22′21″E
- Country: Syria
- Governorate: Hama
- District: Salamiyah
- Subdistrict: Sa'an

Population (2004)
  - Total: 3,360
- Time zone: UTC+3 (AST)
- City Qrya Pcode: C3275

Al-Sa'an (Arabic: السعن, also spelled as-Si'in and also known as Sa'n al-Shajara) is a Syrian town located in the al-Sa'an Subdistrict in Salamiyah District, located in the Syrian Desert, 50 kilometers northeast of Salamiyah and northeast of Hama. According to the Syria Central Bureau of Statistics (CBS), al-Sa'an had a population of 3,360 in the 2004 census. Its inhabitants are predominantly Ismailis.

Al-Sa'an was founded in the late 19th century by Ismaili migrants from other parts of northern Syria who chose to settle the place because of worsening economic conditions in the interior parts of Syria, the low taxes that living in the Syrian Desert fringes offered, and the place's proximity to Salamiyah, the center of Ismaili life in Syria. During the Ottoman era, when it was founded, it became the remotest Ismaili village in Syria. At the time, it contained a military post manned by Ottoman troops.

On 4 December 2024, Tahrir al-Sham captured the city during the Hama offensive.
