= Shaykh Ali =

Sheikh Ali, Hama الشيخ علي
- Village
- Location in Syria
- Country: Syria
- Governorate: Hama
- District: Salamiyah District
- Subdistrict: Salamiyah Subdistrict

Population (2004)
  - Total: 990
- Time zone: UTC+3 (AST)
- City Qrya Pcode: N/A

Sheikh Ali, Hama (Arabic: الشيخ علي) is a Syrian village located in Salamiyah Subdistrict in Salamiyah District, Hama Governorate. According to the Syria Central Bureau of Statistics (CBS), it had a population of 990 in the 2004 census.
