= Umm Tuweineh =

Umm Tuweineh أم توينة
- Village
- Location in Syria
- Coordinates: 35.163108°N 37.054181°E
- Country: Syria
- Governorate: Hama
- District: Salamiyah
- Subdistrict: Salamiyah

Population (2004)
  - Total: 566
- Time zone: UTC+3 (AST)
- City Qrya Pcode: C3250

Umm Tuweineh (Arabic: أم توينة) is a village in central Syria, administratively part of the Salamiyah District of the Hama Governorate. According to the Syria Central Bureau of Statistics (CBS), Umm Tuweineh had a population of 566 in the 2004 census.
