= Sheykh Ali Mahalleh, Gilan =

Sheykh Ali Mahalleh شيخ علي محله
- Village
- Location within Iran
- Coordinates: 38°26′07″N 48°49′17″E
- Country: Iran
- Province: Gilan
- County: Astara
- Bakhsh: Central
- Rural District: Virmuni

Population (2006)
  - Total: 94
- Time zone: UTC+3:30 (IRST)
  - Summer (DST): UTC+4:30 (IRDT)

Sheykh Ali Mahalleh (Persian: شيخ علي محله, also Romanized as Sheykh ‘Alī Maḩalleh) is a village in Virmuni Rural District, in the Central District of Astara County, Gilan Province, Iran. At the 2006 census, its population was 94, in 23 families.

== Language ==
Linguistic composition of the village.

Sheykh Ali Mahalleh linguistic composition
language	percent
Azerbaijani	60%
Talysh	40%
