= Qasr al-Mukharram =

Qasr al-Makhram قصر المخرم
- Village
- Location in Syria
- Coordinates: 35°19′42″N 36°56′55″E
- Country: Syria
- Governorate: Hama
- District: Hama
- Subdistrict: Suran

Population (2004)
  - Total: 552
- Time zone: UTC+3 (AST)
- City Qrya Pcode: C3039

Qasr al-Mukharram (Arabic: قصر المخرم) is a Syrian village located in the Suran Subdistrict in Hama District. According to the Syria Central Bureau of Statistics (CBS), Qasr al-Makhram had a population of 552 in the 2004 census. The village contains ruins dating back to the Roman era.
