= Sheykh Ali, West Azerbaijan =

Sheykh Ali شيخ علي
- Village
- Location within Iran
- Coordinates: 36°42′10″N 46°02′19″E
- Country: Iran
- Province: West Azerbaijan
- County: Bukan
- Bakhsh: Simmineh
- Rural District: Akhtachi-ye Sharqi

Population (2006)
  - Total: 279
- Time zone: UTC+3:30 (IRST)
  - Summer (DST): UTC+4:30 (IRDT)

Sheykh Ali (Persian: شيخ علي, also Romanized as Sheykh ‘Alī) is a village in Akhtachi-ye Sharqi Rural District, Simmineh District, Bukan County, West Azerbaijan Province, Iran. At the 2006 census, its population was 279, in 42 families.
