= Rasm Elabed, Idlib =

Rasm Elabed رسم العبد
- Village
- Location in Syria
- Coordinates: 35°41′35″N 37°3′43″E
- Country: Syria
- Governorate: Idlib
- District: Maarrat al-Nu'man District
- Subdistrict: Sinjar Nahiyah

Population (2004)
  - Total: 414
- Time zone: UTC+2 (EET)
  - Summer (DST): UTC+3 (EEST)
- City Qrya Pcode: C3998

Rasm Elabed, Idlib (Arabic: رسم العبد) is a Syrian village located in Sinjar Nahiyah in Maarrat al-Nu'man District, Idlib. According to the Syria Central Bureau of Statistics (CBS), Rasm Elabed, Idlib had a population of 414 in the 2004 census.
