= Al-Anz =

Al-Anz العنز
- Village
- Location in Syria
- Coordinates: 35°15′37″N 37°1′14″E
- Country: Syria
- Governorate: Hama
- District: Hama
- Subdistrict: Hamraa

Population (2004)
  - Total: 146
- Time zone: UTC+3 (AST)
- City Qrya Pcode: C3089

Al-Anz (Arabic: العنز) is a Syrian hamlet located in al-Hamraa Subdistrict in Hama District. According to the Syria Central Bureau of Statistics (CBS), al-Anz had a population of 146 in the 2004 census. On 27 January 2025, 5 people were killed in an attack in the settlement.
