= Jabal al-Bilas =

Mountain in Syria

Coordinates: 34°55′11″N 37°39′0″E

Jabal al-Bilas (Arabic: جبل البلعاس) is a desert height located 500 meters (1,640 ft) above sea level in Syria.

A marker, laid by Roman governor Silanus 75 kilometres (47 mi) northwest of Palmyra, was found there, probably marking the Palmyrene's boundaries with Epiphania.

Occasional old pistachio trees of up to 5 meters in height can still be found there.

== Syrian Civil War ==
On 19 April 2022, in the Al-Fasedah area, a landmine planted by Islamic State militants exploded, targeting a group of Pro-Assad soldiers, killing 3 of them and injuring 3 others.

== Sources ==
- Al-Fares, Wafi (2013). Historical Land Use/Land Cover Classification Using Remote Sensing: A Case Study of the Euphrates River Basin in Syria. Springer. ISBN 9783319006246.
- Seyrig, Henri (1959). "Antiquités Syriennes 76: Caractères de l'histoire d'Émèse". Syria (in French). 36 (3–4).
