= Shahrak-e Kalateh-ye Sheikh Ali =

Shahrak-e Kalateh-ye Sheikh Ali شهرك كلاته شيخ علي
- Village
- Country: Iran
- Province: South Khorasan
- County: Qaen
- Bakhsh: Central
- Rural District: Qaen

Population (2006)
  - Total: 165
- Time zone: UTC+3:30 (IRST)
  - Summer (DST): UTC+4:30 (IRDT)

Shahrak-e Kalateh-ye Sheikh Ali (Persian: شهرك كلاته شيخ علي, also Romanized as Shahraḵ-e Kalāteh-ye Sheykh ʿAlī) is a village in Qaen Rural District, in the Central District of Qaen County, South Khorasan Province, Iran. At the 2006 census, its population was 165, in 44 families.
