= Sheykh Ali, Chaharmahal and Bakhtiari =

Sheykh Ali شيخ عالي
- Village
- Location within Iran
- Coordinates: 32°18′09″N 49°56′02″E
- Country: Iran
- Province: Chaharmahal and Bakhtiari
- County: Kuhrang
- Bakhsh: Bazoft
- Rural District: Bazoft

Population (2006)
  - Total: 166
- Time zone: UTC+3:30 (IRST)
  - Summer (DST): UTC+4:30 (IRDT)

Sheykh Ali (Persian: شيخ عالي, also Romanized as Sheykh ‘Ālī; also known as Darreh Sheykh ‘Ālī) is a village in Bazoft Rural District, Bazoft District, Kuhrang County, Chaharmahal and Bakhtiari Province, Iran. At the 2006 census, its population was 166, in 31 families. The village is populated by Lurs.
