= Tony Tirado =

Peruvian footballer and sports commentator

Tony Tirado is a Peruvian sports commentator and former football goalkeeper in the North American Soccer League. He was the main soccer sportscaster for Spanish International Network (SIN), the forerunner to Univision, during the 1980s before moving to Telemundo from 1987 to 1994. He covered the 1986 World Cup for SIN alongside Norberto Longo and Jorge Berry.
