= Rasm al-Abed =

Rasm al-Abed رسم العبد
- Town
- Location in Syria
- Coordinates: 36°8′17″N 37°35′52″E
- Country: Syria
- Governorate: Aleppo
- District: Dayr Hafir District
- Subdistrict: Kuweires Sharqi Subdistrict

Population (2004)
  - Total: 2,416
- Time zone: UTC+2 (EET)
  - Summer (DST): UTC+3 (EEST)
- City Qrya Pcode: C1287

Rasm al-Abed (Arabic: رسم العبد) is a Syrian town located in Dayr Hafir District, Aleppo. According to the Syria Central Bureau of Statistics (CBS), Rasm al-Abed had a population of 2,416 in the 2004 census. Rasm al-Abed was captured by Syrian Arab Army on 15 March 2017 from ISIS.
