= Qastal al-Burj =

Coordinates: 35°45′N 36°16′E

Qastal al-Burj قسطل البرج
- Village
- Location in Syria
- Country: Syria
- Governorate: Hama
- District: Al-Suqaylabiyah District
- Subdistrict: Al-Ziyarah Nahiyah

Population (2004)
  - Total: 36
- Time zone: UTC+3 (AST)
- City Qrya Pcode: N/A

Qastal al-Burj (Arabic: قسطل البرج qasṭal al-burj, al-Borj al-Qastal) is a Syrian village located in Al-Ziyarah Nahiyah in Al-Suqaylabiyah District, Hama. According to the Syria Central Bureau of Statistics (CBS), the village had a population of 36 in the 2004 census. At the start of the Syrian Civil War it was a Christian village.

== Syrian Civil War ==
In May 2012, the ten Christian families living in the village were displaced by the Syrian rebels. Whether its residents left at request of the rebels or were driven out by force is disputed. On 1 October 2024, Syrian regime forces shelled the village with artillery.
