= Sheykh Ali, Hajjiabad =

Sheykh Ali شيخ عالي
- Village
- Location within Iran
- Coordinates: 28°08′57″N 56°45′40″E
- Country: Iran
- Province: Hormozgan
- County: Hajjiabad
- Bakhsh: Ahmadi
- Rural District: Kuh Shah

Population (2006)
  - Total: 75
- Time zone: UTC+3:30 (IRST)
  - Summer (DST): UTC+4:30 (IRDT)

Sheykh Ali (Persian: شيخ عالي, also Romanized as Sheykh ‘Ālī) is a village in Kuh Shah Rural District, Ahmadi District, Hajjiabad County, Hormozgan Province, Iran. At the 2006 census, its population was 75, in 20 families.
