= Halban, Idlib =

Halban, Idlib حلبان
- Village
- Location in Syria
- Coordinates: 35°42′48″N 36°56′52″E
- Country: Syria
- Governorate: Idlib
- District: Maarrat al-Nu'man District
- Subdistrict: Sinjar Nahiyah

Population (2004)
  - Total: 530
- Time zone: UTC+2 (EET)
  - Summer (DST): UTC+3 (EEST)
- City Qrya Pcode: C4002

Halban, Idlib (Arabic: حلبان) is a Syrian village located in Sinjar Nahiyah in Maarrat al-Nu'man District, Idlib. According to the Syria Central Bureau of Statistics (CBS), Halban, Idlib had a population of 530 in the 2004 census.
