= Uqayribat =

Uqayribat عقيربات Oqeirbat, Aqayrbat
- Town
- Location in Syria
- Coordinates: 35.043050°N 37.465696°E
- Country: Syria
- Governorate: Hama
- District: Salamiyah
- Subdistrict: Uqayribat
- Founded: 1900

Population (2004)
  - Total: 2,745
- Time zone: UTC+3 (AST)
- City Qrya Pcode: C3315

Uqayribat (Arabic: عقيربات ALA-LC: ʿUqayribāt) also spelled Oqeirbat, Uzeiribat, ′Aqayrbat, ′Agareb, Aaqerbate, Occariba or Occaraba is a Syrian town in the Uqayribat Subdistrict of the Salamiyah District in Hama Governorate. It is situated at the western foot of Jabal Bal'as and along the route connecting Palmyra (Tadmur) to the southeast with Salamiyah to the west. According to the Syria Central Bureau of Statistics (CBS), ′Uqayribat had a population of 2,745 in the 2004 census.

== History ==
=== Roman and Byzantine periods ===
Uqayribat is identified as the site of the Roman-era town of Occaraba, listed on the Peutinger Table. In the Notitia Dignitatum, a Roman document, Occaraba is mentioned as a garrison of the equites promoti Illyriciani legion. The Czech explorer Alois Musil did not locate any Roman remains in the village during his early 20th-century expedition in the region. In 2018, a large mosaic was discovered in Uqayribat which belongs to an early Byzantine church.

=== Early Muslim period ===
According to the 9th-century Persian geographer, Ibn Khordadbeh, during the Abbasid era, Uqayribat was one of the administrative subdistricts of Homs, along with al-Qastal, Salamiyah and Zumayn, all of which were part of the larger district of Jund Hims. It remained an administrative subdistrict of Homs by the 13th century as well.

=== Modern period ===
In 1900, the modern-day village of Uqayribat was founded by a group of farmers who migrated 100 kilometers northwest from their hometown of Palmyra to cultivate and settle the place. The settlement was built on a small elevation. The Ottomans, who ruled Syria between 1517 and 1917, established a gendarme post at the new settlement. Uqayribat soon after became the center of the surrounding region, which too was developing agriculturally and which was increasingly settled by formerly nomadic Bedouin tribesmen throughout the early 20th century. In 1908, Musil noted that the village and its agriculturally productive vicinity belonged to the Arab sheikh of Palmyra.

During the Syrian Civil War, ISIS captured the town from the Syrian Armed Forces in 2014. On 3 September 2017 the town was regained by the Syrian Arab Army. However, on 9 September 2017, the army lost large parts of the town. On 15 September 2017, the Syrian army recaptured the town Uqayribat after the huge counter-attack and the heavy air raids of the Russian aircraft and helicopters. Many civilian casualties occurred.
