= Sheykh Ali Mahalleh, Mazandaran =

Sheykh Ali Mahalleh شيخ علی محله
- Village
- Location within Iran
- Coordinates: 36°40′45″N 53°05′11″E
- Country: Iran
- Province: Mazandaran
- County: Sari
- Bakhsh: Rudpey
- Rural District: Rudpey-ye Sharqi

Population (2016)
  - Total: 496
- Time zone: UTC+3:30 (IRST)

Sheykh Ali Mahalleh (Persian: شيخ علی محله, also Romanized as Sheykh ‘Alī Maḩalleh) is a village in Rudpey-ye Sharqi Rural District, in the Rudpey District of Sari County, Mazandaran Province, Iran. At the 2016 census, its population was 496, in 167 families. Up from 443 in 2006.
