= Barri Sharqi Subdistrict =

Barri Sharqi Subdistrict ناحية بري شرقي
- Subdistrict (nahiyah)
- Location in Hama Governorate

- Location in Syria
- Country: Syria
- Governorate: Hama
- District: Salamiyah District
- Capital: Barri Sharqi

Population (2004)
  - Total: 13,767
- Time zone: UTC+2 (EET)
  - Summer (DST): UTC+3 (EEST)
- Nahya pcod: SY050301

Barri Sharqi Subdistrict (Arabic: ناحية بري شرقي) is a Syrian nahiyah (Subdistrict) located in Salamiyah District in Hama. According to the Syria Central Bureau of Statistics (CBS), Barri Sharqi Subdistrict had a population of 13,767 in the 2004 census.
