= Al-Saan Subdistrict =

Al-Saan Subdistrict ناحية السعن
- Subdistrict (nahiyah)
- Location in Hama Governorate

- Location in Syria
- Coordinates: 35.3453°N 37.7544°E
- Country: Syria
- Governorate: Hama
- District: Salamiyah District
- Capital: Al-Saan

Population (2004)
  - Total: 14,366
- Time zone: UTC+2 (EET)
  - Summer (DST): UTC+3 (EEST)
- Nahya pcod: SY050302

Al-Saan Subdistrict (Arabic: ناحية السعن) is a Syrian nahiyah (subdistrict) located in Salamiyah District in Hama. According to the Syria Central Bureau of Statistics (CBS), Al-Saan Subdistrict had a population of 14,366 in the 2004 census.
