= Sabburah Subdistrict =

Sabburah Subdistrict ناحية صبورة
- Subdistrict (nahiyah)
- Location in Hama Governorate

- Location in Syria
- Country: Syria
- Governorate: Hama
- District: Salamiyah District
- Capital: Sabburah

Population (2004)
  - Total: 21,900
- Time zone: UTC+2 (EET)
  - Summer (DST): UTC+3 (EEST)
- Nahya pcod: SY050303

Sabburah (Arabic: ناحية صبورة) is a Syrian nahiyah (subdistrict) located in Salamiyah District in Hama. According to the Syria Central Bureau of Statistics (CBS), Sabburah Subdistrict had a population of 21900 in the 2004 census. The district is predominantly inhabited by Ismailis with a minority of Sunnis and Alawites.
