= Uqayribat Subdistrict =

Uqayribat Subdistrict ناحية عقيربات
- Subdistrict (nahiyah)
- Location in Hama Governorate

- Location in Syria
- Country: Syria
- Governorate: Hama
- District: Salamiyah District
- Capital: Uqayribat

Population (2004)
  - Total: 21,004
- Time zone: UTC+2 (EET)
  - Summer (DST): UTC+3 (EEST)
- Nahya pcod: SY050304

Uqayribat Subdistrict (Arabic: ناحية عقيربات) is a Syrian nahiyah (subdistrict) located in Salamiyah District in Hama. According to the Syria Central Bureau of Statistics (CBS), Uqayribat Subdistrict had a population of 21,004 in the 2004 census.
