= Salamiyah Subdistrict =

Salamiyah Subdistrict ناحية مركز السلمية
- Subdistrict (nahiyah)
- Location in Hama Governorate

- Location in Syria
- Country: Syria
- Governorate: Hama
- District: Salamiyah District
- Capital: Salamiyah

Population (2004)
  - Total: 115,300
- Time zone: UTC+2 (EET)
  - Summer (DST): UTC+3 (EEST)
- Nahya pcod: SY050300

Salamiyah Subdistrict (Arabic: ناحية مركز السلمية) is a Syrian nahiyah (subdistrict) located in Salamiyah District in Hama. According to the Syria Central Bureau of Statistics (CBS), Salamiyah Subdistrict had a population of 115,300 in the 2004 census.
