= Salamiyah District =

Salamiyah District سلمية
- District
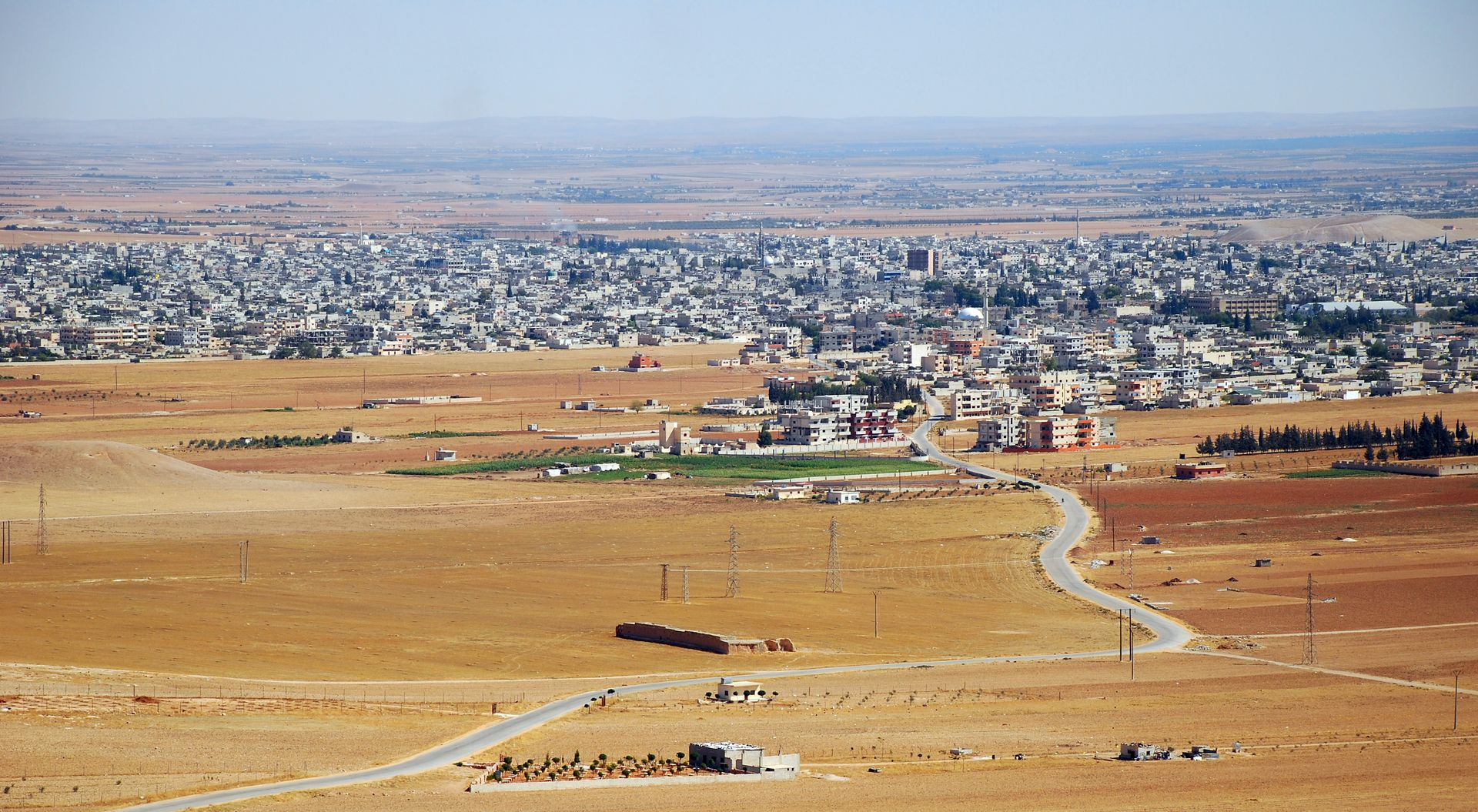
- City of Salamiyah

- Map of Salamiyah District within Hama Governorate
- Coordinates (Salamiyah): 35°0′42″N 37°3′9″E
- Country: Syria
- Governorate: Hama
- Seat: Salamiyah
- Subdistricts: 5 nawāḥī

Population (2004)
  - Total: 186,337

Salamiyah District (Arabic: سلمية Maṣyāf) is a district (manṭiqat) of the Homs Governorate, Syria. According to the 2004 Census it had a population of 186,337. The district is divided into five sub-districts (nawāḥī). Its capital is the city of Salamiyah.

== History ==
Salamiyah may be identified with the ancient city of Salamias or Salaminias, which was earlier known as Salam-mi'a. The settlemnt was supposedly built by the survivivors of the destroyed town of al-Mu'tafika. It developed as an outpost on the trade route connecting Palmyra and Mesopotamia. It was developed in the eight century CE by the Abbasid governors of the region. During the early ninth century, Salamiyah became an important centre of the Ismaili movement. Abdullah al-Mahdi Billah, who later established the Fatimid Caliphate, settled in the town until 902 CE, from where missionaries were dispatched to different regions to spread Ismaili teachings. Salamiyah gradually lost its importance and was deserted after several Mongol raids in the 14th century. In the mid-19th century, under the Ottoman Empire, authorities permitted Ismaili settlers to establish a permanent settlement in the area. and by 1861, it had developed as a large settlement. In 1884, the Ottoman authorities established a separate administrative district with Salamiyah as the administrative center in the Hama governorate.

During the Syrian civil war, the district remained under the control of the government forces, which withdrew from Salamiyah in December 2024, following the advance of opposition forces towards Hama. The Syrian National Ismaili Council negotiated an agreement with Hay'at Tahrir al-Sham following the fall of the Bashar al-Assad government.

== Geography ==
Salamiyah District is one of the six administrative districts (manṭiqat) of Hama Governorate, Syria. (Note: Sources state the five districts of Hama Governorate as Al-Suqaylabiyah, Hama, Salamiyah, Maharda, and Masyaf. Salhab District was established by a presidential decree in 2024.) The city of Salamiyah, the capital of the district, is located approximately 40 km (25 miles) southeast of Hama and 56 km (35 miles) northeast of Homs. The district is divided into five sub-districts (nawāḥī)–Salamiyah (سَلَمْيَة), Barri Sharqi (بري الشرقي), Al-Saan (السعن), Sabburah (صبورة), and Uqayribat (عقيربات).

== Demographics ==
According to the 2004 census, the district had a population of 186,337, comprising 94,960 males and 91,377 females. The census recorded 34,647 households, with an average household size of 5.4 people. The illiteracy rate was 13.0% among males and 28.1% among females. About 56.3% of the population were recorded as engaged in paid work, 18.9% were self-employed and 17.8% worked without pay. Approximately 90.3% of the households were own houses.

The 2004 census recorded 68,184 inhabitants in Salamiyah sub-district, 39,814 in Jubb Ramlah, 33,344 in Awj, 16,502 in Ayn Halaqim and 12,951 in Wadi al-Uyun. According to the United Nations Office for the Coordination of Humanitarian Affairs (OCHA), the population was estimated in 2021 as 245,459 in Salamiyah sub-district, 17,807 in Barri Sharqi, 21,200 in Al-Saan, 2,204 in Uqayribat, and 31,494 in Sabburah. According to OCHA's 2024 report, Salamiyah sub-district had an estimated population of 253,139, Al-Saan had 15,174, Barri Sharqi had 22,085, Uqayribat had 9,811 and Sabburah had 27,501. The combined estimated population of the five sub-districts was 327,710, including 22,963 internally displaced people. The combined estimated population of the district was 327,710, including 22,963 internally displaced people.

== Economy ==
The economy is largely based on agriculture and animal husbandry. As most of the land is covered by desert, semi-nomadic herding communities raise sheep in the rural areas. Agriculture is carried out in small patches of land in the desert.
