= Northwestern Syria campaign (October 2017 – February 2018) =

Major phase of the Syrian civil war

Coordinates: 34.5600°N 38.2672°E

- Part of the Syrian Civil War and the inter-rebel conflict during the Syrian Civil War and the Russian military intervention in the Syrian Civil War
- Situation as of 13 February 2018 Syrian Army control Syrian Opposition control SDF control Syrian Army & SDF control
| Date | 9 October 2017 – 13 February 2018 (4 months and 4 days) |
| Location | Northwestern Syria: Northeastern Hama Governorate; Southeastern Idlib Governorate; Southwestern Aleppo Governorate |
| Result | Syrian government victory |
| Territorial changes | ISIL reenters the Aleppo Governorate and Idlib Governorate and captures more than 100 villages from HTS and pro-government forces; Syrian Army captures Abu al-Duhur Airbase and more than 300 towns and villages, including Abu al-Duhur, from the rebels in Hama, Aleppo and Idlib governorates; Syrian Army encircles ISIL in a large pocket which spans the three provinces, then captures the entire ISIL pocket; Remnants of ISIL forces relocate from Hama to rebel-held Idlib and after fighting surrender to the rebels |

Belligerents
| Islamic State of Iraq and the Levant | Syrian Salvation Government; (Syrian opposition) Free Syrian Army; Ahrar al-Sham; Nour al-Din al-Zenki Movement; Jaysh al-Ahrar; Abu Amara Special Task Battalion; Turkistan Islamic Party in Syria; Ajnad al-Kavkaz; Junud al-Sham; Caucasus Emirate; Tarkhan's Jamaat | (Syria) Syrian Arab Republic (from 22 Oct.); Hezbollah; Russia (from 22 Oct.); Iran; Liwa al-Quds |

Commanders and leaders
| Unknown | Abu Mohammad al-Julani (Emir of Hay'at Tahrir al-Sham); Abu Uthman Ashdaa † (Special Forces commander); Abu Bakr Tuhaidi † (Leader of the Movement of Mujahiddeen of the Sunnis of Iran); Salahuddin Shishani † (Emir of Jaysh Usrah); Abu Dhar al-Libi †; Saeed Nasrallah †; Abu Amnah †; Abu Mou’az Al-Afghani †; Abu Nasser Qusayya †; Abu Hamza al-Masri † Col. Mustafa Bakour (Army of Glory commander); Capt. Hasan Haj Ali (Free Idlib Army and Mountain Hawks Brigade commander); Mahmoud al-Dani † (Lions of Justice Regiment commander); Hussein Abdel-Razzaq Bakkour † (Elite Army commander) Ibrahim Khaled al-Alloush †; Hani al-Alloush †; Yousef Khaled al-Yousef † | Maj. Gen. Suheil al-Hassan; Gen. Mohammad Khaddour |

Units involved
| (Islamic State) Military of ISIL: Liwa al-Aqsa; Wilayat Hama; Wilayat Idlib | Hay'at Tahrir al-Sham; Jaish al-Muhajireen wal-Ansar; Katibat al-Ghuraba al-Turkistan; Jaysh Usrah; Movement of Mujahideen of the Sunnis of Iran; Soldiers of the Epics; (Syrian opposition) Free Syrian Army; Jaysh al-Izza; 1st Coastal Division; (Syrian opposition) Jaysh al-Nasr; Sham Legion; (Syrian opposition) Jaysh al-Nukhba; (Syrian opposition) Free Idlib Army; (Syrian opposition) Central Division; (Syrian opposition) 1st Infantry Division; (Syrian opposition) Jaysh al-Thani; 40th Brigade | Syrian Arab Armed Forces; Syrian Army; 3rd Armoured Division; Qalamoun Shield Forces; Republican Guard; 124th Brigade; 4th Armoured Division; 18th Armoured Division; 131st Armored Brigade; Tiger Forces; Air Force Intelligence Directorate; National Defence Forces Syrian Air Force; Russian Armed Forces and affiliated paramilitaries; Aerospace Forces; Wagner Group; (Iran) IRGC; Quds Force |

Strength
| 500+ (Oct. 2017); 1,000 (Jan. 2018) 200 (Feb. 2018) | Unknown | Unknown |

Casualties and losses
| 343 killed, 200+ wounded, 410 captured | (Syrian opposition) 962 killed (Turkey) 1 killed 6 wounded | (Syria) 453 killed 35 captured 1 killed |
- 223 civilians killed 6,000+ civilians displaced

The northwestern Syria campaign (October 2017 – February 2018) was a large-scale military operation that initially started with an offensive conducted by the Islamic State (IS) forces on areas controlled by Hay'at Tahrir al-Sham (HTS) in the northern Hama Governorate. Subsequently, the Syrian Arab Armed Forces launched their own offensive against HTS and other rebel groups in the area. The campaign took place at the intersection of the provinces of Hama, Idlib and Aleppo.

== The offensive ==
=== ISIL and Army advances ===
Map showing the initial ISIL-HTS clashes

On 9 October 2017, ISIL attacked HTS in the northeastern Hama countryside near the southern administrative border of the Idlib Governorate. ISIL members that attacked HTS allegedly sneaked into northern Hama from the area east of Salamiyah where they had been besieged by the Syrian Army in a pocket centered around Uqayribat. An opposition activist accused Syrian government forces of opening a 13-kilometer gap for ISIL militants to enter HTS territory. ISIL captured more than a dozen villages, including Rahjan, before HTS launched a counter-attack and recaptured five villages. Over the next two weeks, fighting continued, with HTS managing to recapture 11 more villages, including Rahjan.

Starting on 22 October, government forces conducted heavy air-strikes against HTS positions in the area and on 24 October, a ground assault was launched from the direction of Ithriya. The Syrian Army took advantage of the fighting between HTS and ISIL, quickly seizing several areas from the latter. The ultimate aim of the government offensive was reported to be either the rebel-held Abu al-Duhur Military Airbase in the eastern part of the Idlib Governorate or to simply push out HTS from that part of Hama's countryside into Idlib. The same day as the Army's ground offensive started, an ISIL infiltration attempt against HTS lines was repelled. As the Army offensive was developing, clashes continued between HTS and ISIL, while it was reported that fighting between the Army and ISIL had stopped as of 26 October. By 28 October, more than 350 air-strikes had been conducted and the military managed to capture between six and ten villages from both HTS and ISIL, with ISIL confined to just five villages. During the night between 27 and 28 October, elements of the 3rd and 4th Division of the Syrian Army were approaching to Rahjan.

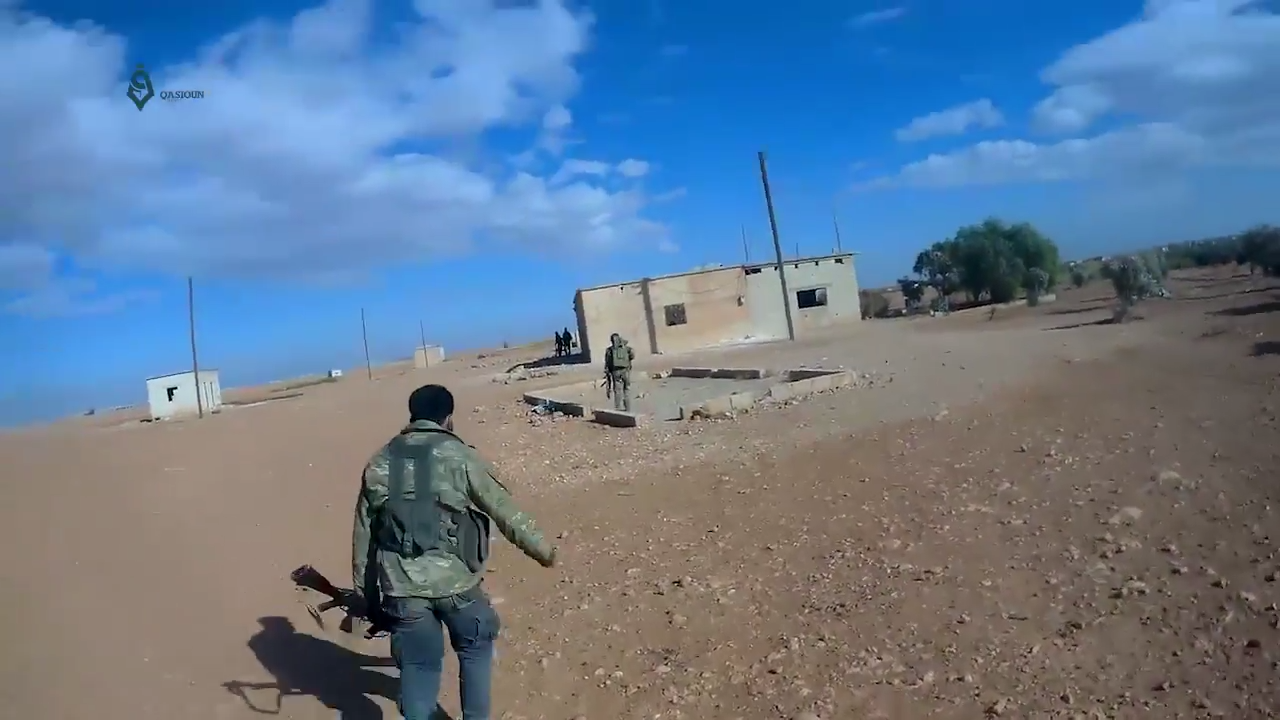
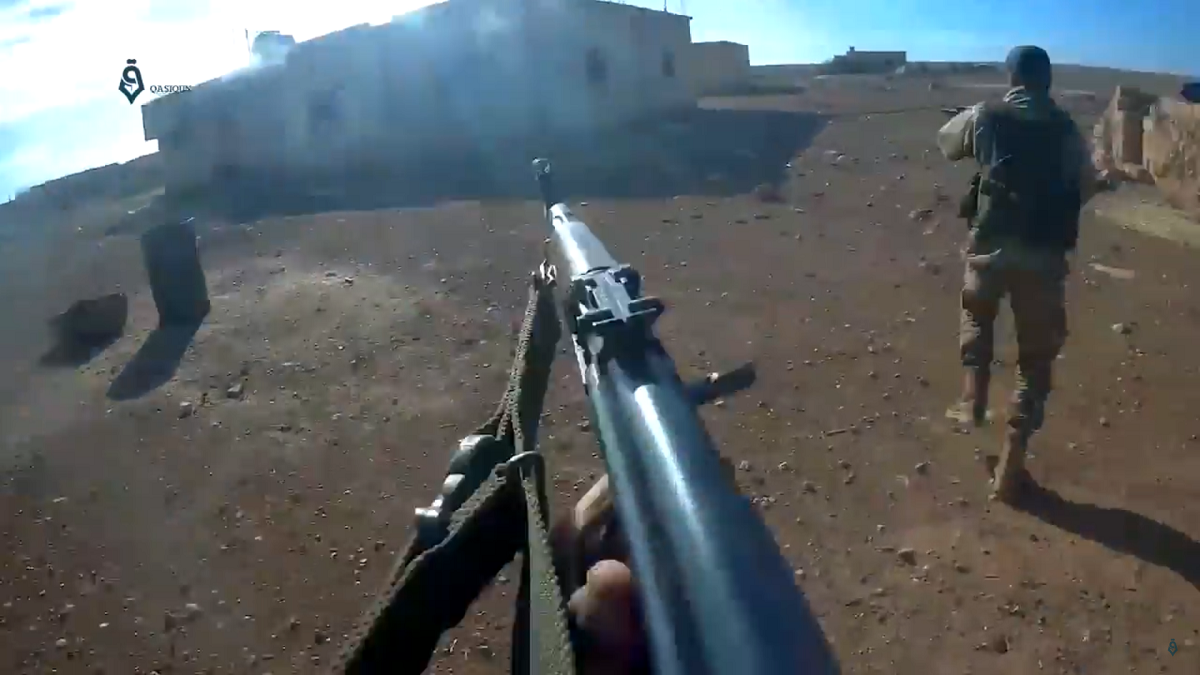
Tahrir al-Sham fighters storm the ISIL-held village of Mushairfa, northeast of Hama, during the offensive on 31 October 2017. This footage was taken with a helmet camera.

On 30 October, heavy fighting was taking place as both the Syrian Army and ISIL were attempting to make advances against HTS, while HTS was attempting to advance against the other two. Between 31 October and 1 November, the Army seized between five and seven villages from HTS. Meanwhile, HTS reportedly seized two villages from ISIL, forcing ISIL to retreat to its three remaining villages in the area.

On 2 November, the Army launched an assault on a different axis, attacking and capturing four villages, including the rebel stronghold of Al-Rashadiyah, in the southern countryside of Aleppo. However, the following day, HTS counter-attacked and recaptured the territory they had lost, including Al-Rashadiyah.

On 3 November, the Republican Guard and Qalamoun Shield stormed the HTS-held village of Al-Shakusiyah, eventually capturing it after hours of fighting, although they suffered heavy casualties as HTS and the FSA's Central Division used anti-tank missiles and artillery fire. The capture of the village brought the Syrian Army to the eastern outskirts of Rahjan. Between 4 and 7 November, government forces reportedly captured five more villages. On 8 November, HTS captured a hill overlooking the remaining three villages held by ISIL.

On 13 November, government forces opened a new axis of advance and captured nine villages over the next two days. Meanwhile, between 14 and 16 November, the village of Sarha changed hands three times before ultimately coming under Army control. The military also seized the nearby village of Qasr Ali.

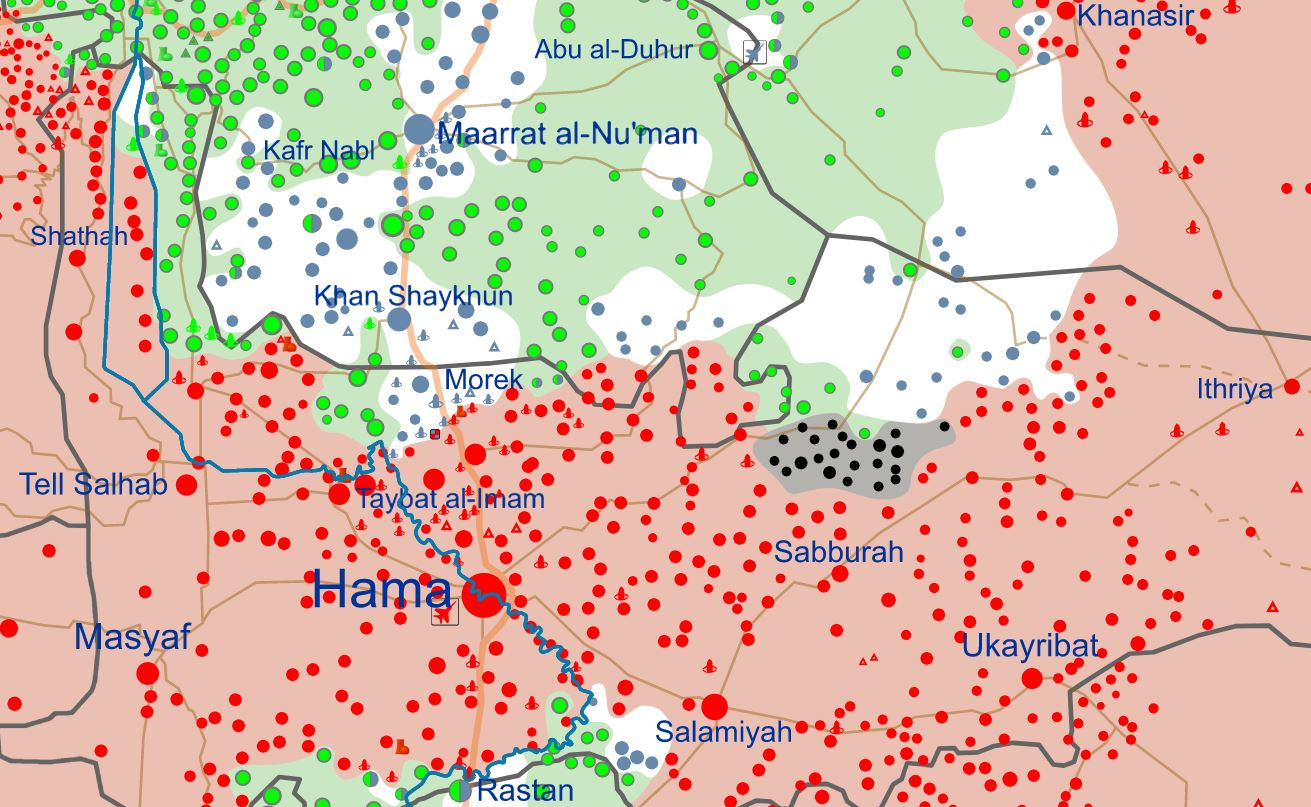
Map of the military situation in Hama and southern Idlib Governorate as of 24 November: Areas held by the government (red), ISIL (black), HTS (white-gray), and other Syrian opposition forces (green).

On 21 November, under the cover of bad weather, ISIL forces attacked from their small pocket HTS positions and managed to capture four villages. Concurrently, an ISIL suicide car bomber also blew himself up in Rahjan. ISIL continued its advances the following day, capturing another nine villages. Meanwhile, the Army launched its finale phase of the offensive, advancing to positions just several hundred meters from Rahjan. At the same time, the military also attacked and captured a village and a nearby hilltop in the southern countryside of Aleppo. By this point, the military captured 29 villages in the Hama countryside during the offensive.

On 24 November, ISIL advances continued with the capture of five more villages from HTS. Four days later, an HTS counter-attack recaptured two villages from ISIL. Meanwhile, after 28 days of back-and-forth fighting, the Army captured a strategic hilltop in the southern countryside of Aleppo, which lead to the capture of the nearby town of Al-Rashadiyah. The Army then pushed out of Al-Rashadiyah, capturing four more nearby villages from the rebels and advancing to within 20 kilometers of the Abu al-Duhur Military Airbase. Government forces also made further advances in the Hama countryside. A subsequent rebel counter-attack recaptured two villages in the Aleppo countryside, although it was later reported that the Army had once again seized one of them and was fighting for the second.

Between 3 and 5 December, the Army made three attempts to capture Rahjan, each time managing to enter the town before being pushed back.

=== ISIL/Army Push into southeastern Idlib ===
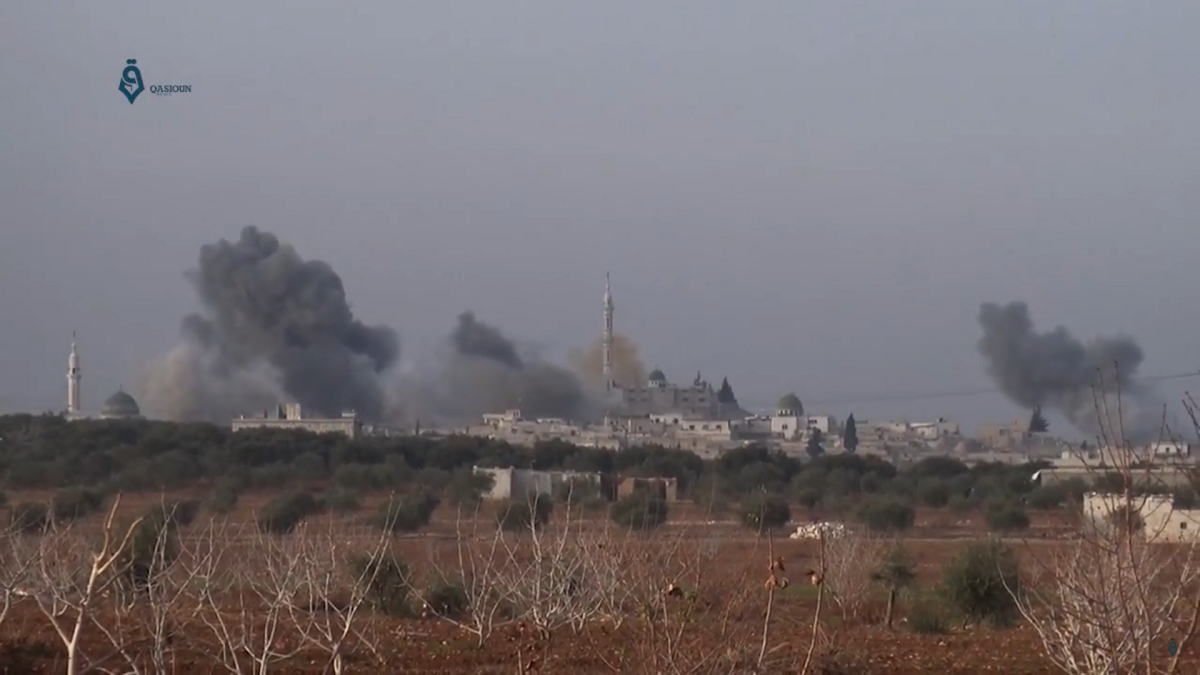
The Syrian Air Force bombs a rebel-held village in Idlib Governorate.

Concurrently, on 3 December, the Syrian Army decided to circumvent the fortified HTS-held village of Balil, instead advancing to the east of it, resulting in the capture of three villages and localities in south-eastern Idlib Governorate, thus flanking Balil from south-west and north-east. Meanwhile, on 5 December, ISIL started making new advances against the rebels, coming to within 10 km of Idlib Governorate's administrative boundaries and capturing eight villages by the following day. ISIL finally reached the Idlib Governorate on 9 December, overrunning three villages and a hilltop with little resistance. Still, on 10 December, the rebels managed to push back ISIL forces out of Idlib. Meanwhile, government forces made some notable progress in Idlib province as well, capturing half a dozen villages between 9 and 10 December. After three days of intense fighting, ISIL fighters captured the village of Rasm Hammam from HTS on 12 December. This stage of the fighting saw major displacement of civilians; the United Nations High Commissioner for Refugees reported on 4 January that more than 60,000 people had fled their homes in Hama and Idlib between 1 November and 24 December.

=== Fighting in southwestern Aleppo ===
Mid-December, much of the fighting between pro-government forces and rebels had moved to southwestern Aleppo, with the Syrian Army reportedly capturing four villages and two hills from HTS between 14 and 19 December. An attempt by the Army to capture the village of Al-Ramleh (in the southeastern countryside of the Aleppo Governorate, according to reports) on 20 December was repelled, with HTS nearly encircling government troops. Six were killed and eight captured.

=== Army push towards Abu al-Duhur ===
Map of SAA and ISIL advances against HTS up to 24 December

A renewed offensive by pro-government forces began in December, with its main target the rebel-held air base of Abu al-Duhur on the southeastern edge of Idlib and securing the road linking Damascus to Aleppo. According to Reuters, government forces are assisted by Iranian-backed militias and Hezbollah in the offensive. The government and its allies took the Idlib village of a-Ruwaydah on 19 December, and conducted two airstrikes on a residential area in the town of Maar Shurin 40 km to the northwest on 20 December, reportedly killing at least 18 civilians including 10 children.

Five villages were recaptured by HTS from ISIL during a counter-attack on 20 December, including Rasm Hammam, though not long afterwards ISIL seized Rasm Hammam once again. During 26 December, the Syrian Army captured an Air Defense Battalion base (Zawr as Sus) and the hilltop of Tell al-Aswad. The same day, HTS shot down a Syrian Arab Air Forces L-39 Albatross using a Strela-2 MANPADS, capturing the pilot and later executing him.

Intense Russian airstrikes were reported on 28–29 December, alongside heavy fighting concentrated in the key village of Abu Dali in southern Idlib. The Syrian Army reported a breakthrough against rebel forces on 28 December, capturing three villages, including Mushayrifah, and later in the day entered Abu Dali, which they said had been abandoned by rebel fighters. On 29 December, Hamadaniyeh, south-west of Abu Dali, was captured by the Syrian Army led by Tiger Forces. After two failed attempts, a rebel stronghold with multiple entrenchments, Atshan, was captured on 30 December by the Tiger Forces. Later, together with 4th Division soldiers, they took the villages of Abu Omar, Al-Saloumyah and Al-Jadouyah.

Umm Elkhalayel, Niha, Hawa, Ard az-Zurzur, Mashraft al-Jouaan, Dreibiyeh, Umm Sehrij were amongst a dozen of settlements captured by the Syrian Army between 1 and 3 January 2018. This period also saw what an aid worker described as a "systematic" attack on hospitals in the region by pro-government forces, with eight hit between the end of December and the beginning of January, allegedly including a major maternity hospital in Maarat al Numan, killing five people and injuring scores, according to pro-rebel Syrian American Medical Society. According to UN figures, more than 70,000 people had fled their homes and moved further into Idlib in recent weeks.

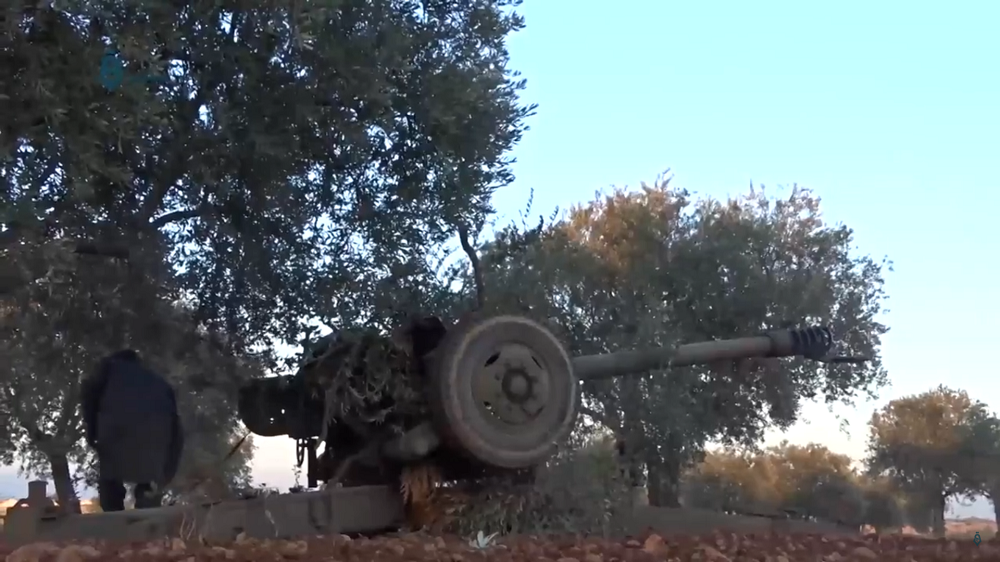
Rebel artillery bombards government forces holding the village of Khuwain in Idlib Governorate.

In the morning of 4 January 4 villages in Idlib where captured. Fourteen more settlements were captured by Syrian Army on 5 January after clashes with fighters of Hay'at Tahrir al-Sham and Jaysh al-Izza. During the same day ISIL militants captured two villages from other rebel groups. The villages of Al-Nasiriya, Lweibdeh Sharki and Lweibdeh Shamaliyah were captured by the Syrian Army during night raid going on into the early hours of 6 January. Further into 6 January, three rural settlements, including Sheikh Barakeh, were captured, in resulting the Syrian Army reaching the outskirts of the key crossroad town of Sinjar. Two more villages were captured in the afternoon. In the morning of 7 January, three additional villages were taken. Numerous localities were taken throughout the day by the Syrian Army, including Sinjar itself. The same day, a rocket attack targeted a Turkish military convoy in Idlib, the rocket landing 20–30 meters from the convoy in Darat Izza district, and in the night Russian and government airstrikes killed at least 21 civilians in Idlib. On 8 January, the Syrian Army captured 14 villages, and dozens of airstrikes were reported by Idlib Civil Defense to have resulted in at least 14 deaths. On 9 January, the Syrian Army captured 15 towns and villages including Rahjan. On 10 January, the Syrian Army captured 25 towns and villages including Tell Silmo, Zafar Saghir, Zafar al-Kabir and Rasm Abed in Idlib governorate, thus reaching the outskirts of Abu al-Duhur Military Airbase. Within Hama governorate, the last HTS stronghold of Um Myal has been captured. This left the HTS-controlled area in the countryside where Hama District borders Idlib and Aleppo governorates almost completely isolated from the larger rebel area centred in Idlib, and also still under pressure from the remaining ISIL pocket on its western edge.

On 11 January, rebels, including the FSA-aligned Jaysh al-Izza, Army of Victory, Free Idlib Army, and the Elite Army, announced the formation of a new joint operations room and new offensive in northeastern Hama and southern Idlib, attacking the newly conquered government territory in southern Idlib from the west. Hezbollah reported that the army and its allies were repelling a "fierce assault" by rebels. Rebels told Reuters they had captured some 15 villages and seized 60 government fighters, while SOHR reported that rebels recaptured 9 villages and two farms from the Syrian army. The FSA fighters were reported to be newly equipped with Turkish armoured vehicles. However, later in the day, the Syrian army recaptured all of the areas it lost, except for three villages. These were also recaptured the following day. On the same day, the Syrian army captured three villages east of Abu al-Duhur Airbase, and conducted heavy air raids during the night, killing at least 11 civilians, including in Khan al-Sabil in southern Idlib. By 14 January 2018, the Syrian army captured 115 villages after advancing through the southern countryside of Aleppo towards the Abu al-Duhur Airbase, leaving only one village separating them from their forces in the eastern countryside of Idlib.

This period of fighting saw continued displacement of civilian residents in Idlib. According to aid agencies, more than 80,000 arrived in camps in the last week of December and first week of January – with the UN reporting the displaced figure had risen to 100,000 by the second week of January – while Turkish security forces caught a record number of nearly 10,000 attempting to cross the frontier in the last 10 days of December.

With support from a range of heavy weaponry, Hay'at Tahrir al-Sham and Turkistan Islamic Party fighters launched a major assault against government forces on 14 January, resulting in capture of 21 villages throughout the day. Atshan was recaptured by the Syrian army on 15 January, with Abu Omar and Al-Hawash recaptured earlier. Tiger Forces conducted a night raid into the early hours of 16 January within the villages of Tell Maraq, Umm Elkhalayel, Al-Zarzour, and Khwein al-Kabir; heavy clashes soon ensued, and the Syrian army said that soldiers in Khwein al-Kabir came under chlorine gas attack, resulting in them having to seek medical attention. On the same day, the Syrian Army said it had acquired partial fire control from the north over Abu al-Duhur Airbase after capture of 3 settlements and a hill. Meanwhile, the Syrian army captured another 5 villages in the southwest countryside of Aleppo, resulting in flanking of Abu al-Duhur airbase from two sides as it neared encirclement. Settlements of Qaytil and Umm Salasil have been captured in southwestern Aleppo countryside by the Syrian army and allied paramilitaries, resulting in them inching closer towards connecting with units in eastern Idlib Governorate.

The changing fronts of the push towards Abu al-Duhur. From 27 Dec – 13 Feb

With rebel forces either defecting to ISIL or abandoning their positions, the rebel salient on the edges of Idlib, Aleppo and Hama governorates, shrunk rapidly, with ISIL taking control over some 30 settlements across the area. By 19 January, rebel forces lost their foothold in northeastern Hama to ISIL.

Syrian state TV, Hezbollah and the Syrian Observatory for Human Rights reported that the Syrian Army it had entered the Abu al-Duhur airbase early on 20 January, and also captured 11 villages that resulted in the encirclement of ISIL fighters within a pocket of over a thousand km^{2}. Within a few hours, they reported the airbase was secured. However, this was denied by rebels and HTS. On the same day, the Syrian army reported it had captured another 10 villages in the southwest countryside of Aleppo, and encircled ISIS in huge pocket spanning Hama, Idlib and Aleppo governorates. On 21 January, the Syrian army announced they had won back the airbase. Other local sources reported that the base was captured on 22 January.

Also on 21 January, Syrian Army and allied paramilitary forces also captured two villages from ISIL in northeastern Hama, and five more settlements from opposition groups in eastern Idlib and southwestern Aleppo provinces. Later in the day, they recaptured two villages in the southeast countryside of Idlib that were lost previously to the rebel's counter-offensive.

the Syrian army captured the town of Abu al-Duhur after two days of clashes with Hay'at Tahrir al-Sham and Turkistan Islamic Party fighters. Elsewhere during the day, the Syrian army captured 7 villages north of the Abu al-Duhur airbase from the rebels, as well as 3 villages from ISIL in northeastern Hama. Hay'at Tahrir al-Sham detonated a car bomb upon a squad of Syrian Army personnel, resulting in the deaths of 5 soldiers on 23 January. During the same day, a settlement to the west of Abu al-Duhur was captured by the Syrian Army after hours of clashes. On 29 January, the Syrian army captured the whole city of Abu al-Duhur, after rebels recaptured parts of it previously and three nearby villages and finally secured the perimeter of Abu al-Duhur Airbase.

=== Further Syrian Army advances and collapse of ISIL pocket ===
Map of ISIL and SAA advances up to 31 January 2018

During the morning of 31 January, the Syrian Army reported that it captured 7 villages and an air defense base in eastern Idlib governorate, and 9 more settlements, several hills and al-Seihah swamp later in the day. On the same day, the Syrian Army captured 3 villages in the southwest countryside of Aleppo. On the next day, the Syrian army captured 3 villages from ISIL in north east Hama, 7 villages in the southwest countryside of Aleppo and one village in the southeastern countryside of Idlib. On 2 February, the Syrian Army captured 7 villages in the southwest countryside of Aleppo and the one village in southeastern countryside of the Idlib.

On 2 February, it was confirmed that key assault units of the elite Tiger Forces Division which had led the Syrian Army's eastern Idlib offensive against the rebels were to soon end their operation in the region and depart to another front.

On 3 February 2018, unidentified militants (claimed by both HTS and the Army of Victory) shot down a Russian Sukhoi Su-25 jet over the province of Idlib, near the town of Maarrat al-Nu'man (57 km north of the city of Hama), presumably by means of a man-portable air-defence system. The pilot, Major Roman Filipov, was killed after he ejected and exchanged gunfire with the militants on the ground, near the ″terrorists-held village of Tell-Debes″, according to the Russian defence ministry. In response to the continuing offensive on the East Idlib front, eleven rebel groups announced the formation of a Unified Operations Room to counter the Syrian Army advance, including Ahrar al-Sham, Faylaq al-Sham, and Nour al-Din al-Zenki.

On 4 February 2018, the Syrian army captured 4 villages from ISIL in north east Hama. On the next day, the Syrian army captured 15 villages and one hill from ISIL in north east Hama and in southeast Aleppo. Meanwhile, the Russian forces stationed in Syria were reported to have intensified their air raids in the region in retaliation for the shootdown of the Su-25.

On 7 February, it was reported that over the previous 48 hours, the Syrian Army had captured some 76 towns and villages from the Islamic State. With this advance, the Syrian Army recaptured 80% of the ISIL pocket and only 250 km^{2} remained under control of ISIL in a small pocket. On 9 February, the Syrian Army captured the entirety of the pocket, including Suruj. The Syrian government announced an end to its operations in Idlib and Aleppo on 10 February.

However, hundreds of ISIL fighters broke out of encirclement and escaped into rebel-held territory, capturing 3 villages in Idlib Governorate. Pro-opposition sources said that government forces had opened up a corridor to allow the ISIL fighters to enter Idlib. On 13 February, the "Repel the Invaders" Idlib rebel alliance announced that the ISIL pocket in the region had been dissolved, after some 250 ISIL fighters with their families surrendered to rebels in the village of Khwein al-Kabirs.

== Aftermath ==
As the ISIL fighters were defeated, fighting continued between pro-government and rebel forces. On 5 February, pro-government forces bombed Idlib city, Maarat al-Numan, Saraqeb and several other towns and cities across central and eastern Idlib, and there were allegations of chemical weapon use in some of these, while rebels claimed to have recaptured territory near Saraqeb. Following the formation of the "Repel the Invaders" operations room, involving seven rebel groups Ahrar al-Sham, Turkish forces deployed military personnel in monitoring outposts close to the front line: in Salwa, north of Idlib; Qalat Samaan and Sheikh Aqeel, west of Aleppo; al-Iss, south of Aleppo; al-Tuqan, a southern suburb of Idlib city; and al-Sirman, near Maarat al-Numan. Anti-HTS Islamist rebel factions Nour al-Din al-Zenki and Ahrar al-Sham merged into the Syrian Liberation Front on 18 February, whose fighting with HTS intensified. Discussions between Russian and Turkey and stronger backing from Turkey for anti-HTS rebels led to a degree of cooling of the conflict, although pro-government air attacks on rebel territories continued. A new government offensive was increasingly anticipated in through the summer, but in September a demilitarization agreement was signed between Russia and Turkey.
