= Timeline of the Syrian civil war (January–April 2018) =

Important events of the Syrian Civil War between January–April 2018

The following is a timeline of the Syrian Civil War from January to April 2018. Information about aggregated casualty counts is found at Casualties of the Syrian Civil War.

== January 2018 ==
=== 2 January ===
- The Syrian Army and allies made advances on the Beit Jinn area, capturing 3 villages and hilltops, in western Ghouta.

=== 4 January ===
- Russian Air Force airstrikes killed 25 civilians in Eastern Ghouta.

=== 5 January ===
- Jaysh al-Islam fighters attempted to infiltrate ISIL positions in the orchards between Yalda and Hajjar As-Aswad, to the immediate south of Damascus city.

=== 7 January ===
- The Syrian Army lifts the siege of Harasta vehicle base, which had been besieged by Hayat Tahrir al-Sham, Ahrar al-Sham and Al-Rahman Legion since 29 December 2017.

=== 11 January ===
- The Syrian army captures 34 villages, including Um-Miyal after advancing south of Aleppo towards the Abu al-Duhur Airbase, reaching a distance of about 6 km from its forces in the eastern countryside of Idlib.

=== 17 January ===
- Several international newspapers (e.g. the Saudi-owned Asharq Al-Awsat, the French Le Monde and the Italian La Repubblica) report on the publication of a civil peace initiative, the Code of Conduct for Syrian Coexistence as a result of years-long secret negotiations between Syrian tribal leaders, representatives of Alawites, Sunnis and various clans and Syrian communities.

=== 20 January ===
- Turkish President Recep Tayyip Erdogan announced the beginning of a military operation to capture Afrin and subsequently Manbij from Kurdish forces (Rojava). It is the first major military operation by Turkey in Syria since Operation Euphrates Shield.
- Syrian Army forces capture the Abu al-Duhur airbase in Idlib governorate.
- The civilian death toll of the Rif Dimashq offensive rose to 200 over the first 48 hours, and the number of hospitals struck rose to seven - the highest 48 hour death toll since the 2013 Ghouta chemical attack.

=== 22 January ===
- Afrin offensive: Turkish forces - TAF/TSK and their Syrian National Army (SNA) allies - announce the capture of seven villages, although the Kurdish YPG recaptured two of them.

=== 27 January ===
- Afrin offensive: As Turkey's Afrin intervention entered its second week, Turkey's Foreign Minister Mevlut Cavusoglu urged the US to 'immediately withdraw' its military personnel from Manbij in northern Syria that's held by the Kurds.

== February 2018 ==
=== 3 February ===
- A Russian Su-25 fighter jet is shot down by a MANPAD while on a patrolling mission over the ″de-escalation zone″ in the Idlib governorate. The pilot, Roman Filipov, safely ejected via parachute but died on the ground in a brief exchange of fire with militants on the outskirts of Saraqib. HTS claimed responsibility for the downing. In response, the Russian Ministry of Defence released alleged footage of airstrikes on HTS territory in the area of the crash site.
- In response to the SAA offensive on the East Idlib front, 11 rebel groups announced the formation of a unified operations room, Dahar al-Ghaza ("Defeat the Invaders"), to counter the Syrian Army and allies' recent advances. The new operations room included Ahrar al-Sham, the Free Idlib Army, Faylaq al-Sham, Nour al-Din al-Zenki, Jaysh al-Izza, Jaysh al-Nukhba, and Jaysh al-Nasr, among others.

=== 5 February ===
- SAA forces reported the capture of Buyud al-Saffaf, Abu al-Kheir, Abu Khanadiq, Rasm al-Kibar, Tell al-Shur, Malihah Saghirah, Rasm al-Mafkar, and Khirbat Umm Rujum from ISIL in northeastern Hama.

=== 6 February ===
- Airstrikes on residential areas of Douma reportedly killed at least 31 civilians, according to the UN.

=== 7 February ===
- Syrian Army forces have recently seized a total of 76 towns and locations from ISIL forces in Idlib Governorate, closing out an ISIL pocket of resistance.
- According to American military sources, Syrian pro-government forces initiated an offensive against US-backed SDF territory east of the Deir ez-Zor deconfliction line, near a Conoco gas field. The US-led coalition conducted strikes against the pro-government forces in support of the SDF. According to one US official, more than 100 pro-government fighters were killed, while about 500 troops participated in the attack; no Americans were injured or killed during the engagement. At a news briefing, Pentagon spokeswoman Dana White claimed the US is "not looking for a conflict with the regime." According to a source close to the Syrian Army, approximately 25-30 Al-Baraka tribesmen were killed in the airstrikes. The Al-Baraka tribesmen are also from the Euphrates River Valley and considered locals. The Russian government later admitted several dozen of its citizens died or were injured during the engagement.

=== 10 February ===
- UN High Commissioner for Human Rights Zeid Ra’ad Al Hussein called for international action after "one of the bloodiest periods of the entire conflict", mainly in Eastern Ghouta and Idlib. The UN Human Rights Office received reports indicating that at least 277 civilians were killed between 4 and 9 February – 230 in pro-government airstrikes – with a further 812 civilians injured.
- An Israeli Air Force F-16I fighter jet was shot down in northern Israel when it was hit by Syrian Air Defense. Both pilots were wounded but ejected and landed in Israeli territory.
- A Turkish Helicopter was shot down by the SDF/YPG south of Omeran village during the Afrin offensive.

=== 12 February ===
- The Kurdish YPG claimed to have had shot down a Turkish Bayraktar TB2 UCAV reconnaissance drone over Qodeh village in Afrin.
- An Israeli army assessment claimed that half of Syria's aerial defense systems were destroyed in the retaliatory air force sortie during the 10 February airstrikes.

=== 13 February ===
- The "Defeat the Invaders" Idlib rebel alliance announced the ISIL pocket in the region had been dissolved after some 400 people (ISIL fighters, their families and wounded) gave themselves up in the village of Khwein al-Kabir.

=== 15 February ===
- Afrin offensive: The Syrian National Army and Turkish forces announced the capturing of five villages from the YPG.

16 February

- Afrin offensive: Turkey allegedly launches a chemical attack against Kurdish forces in Afrin, which leaves 6 people wounded.

=== 18 February ===
- In preparation for a new ground offensive into Eastern Ghouta, the SAA launch air raids and artillery strikes into the rebel-held enclave.
- In Idlib, Ahrar al-Sham and Nour al-Din al-Zenki merge and form the Jabhat Tahrir Suriya (Syria's Liberation Front/SLF) rebel group.

=== 19 February ===
- Heavy clashes erupt in the Aleppo and Idlib Governorates between the Syrian Liberation Front and Tahrir al-Sham.
- In East Ghouta, monitors and activists reported 72 airstrikes, 97 civilian mortalities and 500 injuries in the first 24 hours of the Rif Dimashq offensive. Five hospital were reportedly struck and put out of service.

=== 20 February ===
- Afrin offensive: A convoy of a pro-Syrian government militia called "Popular Forces" entered Afrin to support the YPG but was hit by Turkish artillery "warning shots", forcing the convoy to retreat.

=== 22 February ===
- By the fifth day of the Rif Dimashq offensive (February 2018), monitors reported 38 deaths, making a total of over 300 killed in pro-government air strikes in East Ghouta. Doctors Without Borders said at least 13 hospitals and clinics were damaged or destroyed over the previous days.
- The Syrian government assumes control of Sheikh Maqsood, Ashrafiya, Haidariya, Baaeydin and Holluk neighborhoods in North Aleppo after the YPG/YPJ garrison there deploy to Afrin.

=== 23 February ===
- Airstrikes and artillery attacks on the Eastern Ghouta suburbs of Damascus killed at least 46 people on Thursday, according to Agence France-Presse, bringing the six day death toll to over 400. The UN was unable to reach an agreement on a ceasefire resolution, due to Russian blocking.
- The Kurdish YPG called on the Syrian army to intervene in Afrin, to supplement pro-government militia already there.
- Ahrar al-Sham and Suqour al-Sham rebels attack positions of the Hayat Tahrir al-Sham (HTS) alliance in Idlib, according to SOHR.

=== 25 February ===
- Turkish President Erdogan claims a total of 2,021 YPG militants have been "neutralized" since the launch of the Afrin intervention. The Turkish government uses the term "neutralized" to refer to enemies both captured and killed. In turn, according to the Turkish Army, 32 Turkish soldiers have been killed and 183 others wounded since the beginning of the Afrin operation.
- The SAA begins its ground assault on East Ghouta on multiple fronts.

== March 2018 ==
=== 3 March ===
- The Syrian National Army and Turkish Armed Forces (SNA/TSK) captured the town of Rajo from the YPG along with capturing Ramadiyah and Hamelika villages in the Jinderes district during the ongoing Afrin offensive.

=== 8 March ===
- SNA/TSK forces captured the town of Jindires from the YPG, giving them control of one of the largest settlements in Syria's northwest Afrin region. They also captured the villages of Shawaghat al-Juz, Maarsat al-Khatib, Hallubi Kabir and Hallubi Saghir, and the "Mafraq al Jatt" crossroads, cutting off the Nubl-Kafrjana-Afrin highway.

=== 9 March ===
- SNA/TSK forces seized control of the Maydanki dam and its western bank in Afrin. The dam serves as a water supply to Afrin city.

=== 11 March ===
- The Syrian army captures 59% of the rebel-held eastern Ghouta enclave and divides it into three separate pockets

=== 15 March ===
- Tens of thousands of civilians evacuated the eastern Ghouta suburbs in one of the largest single-day exoduses of civilians since the start of the Syrian war. A similar scale of displacement occurred in Afrin.
- There was renewed government bombing of Daraa, a "de-escalation zone".

=== 18 March ===
- On the 58th day of the Turkish-led Afrin offensive, Afrin city is captured by SNA/TSK forces - punctuated by Turkish and Free Syrian Army flags and banners raised above the city. De-mining operations begin as there were reports of the city being pillaged as military sites and civilian homes and businesses were looted by militants.

=== 28 March ===
- The Syrian Arab Army prepares to attack Douma in eastern Ghouta unless the Jaysh al-Islam insurgent group agrees to hand over the area.

=== 29 March ===
- President Donald Trump announced that the United States will be leaving Syria "very soon".
- President Emmanuel Macron held a meeting with representatives of the Democratic Federation of Northern Syria and plans to send soldiers to SDF-held areas at the Euphrates river.

=== 30 March ===
- Some U.S. commanders interviewed by NBC News warned that recent firings and distracting domestic political tumult within the Trump administration could jeopardize the Special Forces mission against ISIL in Syria.
- One British and one American servicemen were killed by an IED explosion in Manbij along with five other soldiers being injured.

== April 2018 ==
=== 4 April ===
- A summit on achieving a lasting ceasefire in Syria is held in Ankara, Turkey by Iran's President Hassan Rouhani, Turkey's President Recep Tayyip Erdoğan and Russian President Vladimir Putin. The Ankara summit is particularly significant in that Russia and Iran support the Assad government and Turkey's president has supported the Free Syrian Army.

=== 7 April ===
- At least 41 people were reportedly killed in a chemical attack in Douma.

=== 14 April ===
- About 100 buses evacuated the last batch of rebels and civilians from Douma, following which Russian and Syrian government forces took complete control of Douma ending the four years long Siege of Eastern Ghouta.
- The United States, France, and the United Kingdom carried out a series of military strikes against the Syrian Government of Bashar al-Assad.
- The SAA declared eastern Ghouta to be fully liberated after the last batch of Jaysh al-Islam rebel fighters evacuated Douma. Syrian forces promptly began mine-clearing operations in the city.

=== 19 April ===
- The SAA and allied Palestinian militias launch an offensive to dislodge ISIL from their pocket in southern Damascus.

=== 22 April ===
- As a part of an evacuation deal, rebels in East Qalamoun surrendered their weapons to the SAA in exchange for safe evacuation to rebel-held northern Syria, dissolving the rebel pocket of resistance there. The government flag was raised in Jayrud two days later as the last batch of rebels evacuated, signifying government control in the former rebel enclave.
