= Abu Omar =

Abu Omar may refer to:

== People ==
- Abu Omar al-Baghdadi (died 2010), Iraqi insurgent
- Abu Qatada al-Filistini (born 1959), sometimes called Abu Omar, Jordanian militant living in England
- Ahmed Ali Ahmed, also known as Abu Omar, former leader of al-Qaeda in Iraq
- Hassan Mustafa Osama Nasr (born 1963), also known as Abu Omar, Egyptian cleric kidnapped in Milan by the CIA in 2003
- Abu Hassan Omar (1940–2018), Malaysian politician
- Abu Hafs Umar al-Iqritishi (died 855), Muslim pirate
- Abu Hafs Umar al-Nasafi (1067–1142), Muslim jurist and theologian
- Abu Hafs Umar al-Murtada (died 1266), Almohad caliph
- Abu Omar al-Muhajir, Islamic State spokesman
- Mahdi Abu-Omar (born 1970), Palestinian-American chemist
- Mohammed Mohiedin Anis (born 1946/7), Syrian businessman and car collector, also known as Abu Omar
- Nasir (aka Abu Umar, born 1980), Pakistani Lashkar-e-Taiba militant, one of the perpetrators of the 2008 Mumbai attacks
- Nazir (aka Abu Umer), Pakistani Lashkar-e-Taiba militant, also one of the perpetrators of the 2008 Mumbai attacks

== Places ==
- Abu Omar, Idlib, a Syrian village located in Al-Tamanah Nahiyah in Maarrat al-Nu'man District, Idlib
