= Luweibdeh =

Luweibdeh or Lweibdeh may refer to:

- Jabal al-Luweibdeh, a neighborhood in Amman, Jordan
- Lweibdeh, a village in Syria
- Lweibdeh Sharki, a village in Syria
- Lweibdeh Shamaliyah, a village in Syria
