= Niha =

Niha may refer to:

== Places ==
=== Lebanon ===
- Niha, Chouf
  - Fortress of Niha
- Niha, Zahlé
  - Hosn Niha, an archaeological site
- Niha, Batroun

=== Syria ===
- Niha, Idlib
- Niha, Tartus

== Other uses ==
- Nepal Ice Hockey Association (NIHA)

== See also ==
- Nam Niha, a village in Iran
- Nias people, also known as Ono Niha
