= Hawwa (disambiguation) =

Hawwa (Hebrew: חווה; Arabic: حواء) is the Hebrew and Arabic name for Eve.

Hawwa may also refer to:

- Hawwa (album), a studio album by Haifa Wehbe
- Al-Hawwa', a village in Hadhramaut Governorate, Yemen

== People with the surname ==
- Saʽid Ḥawwa (1935–1989), high-ranking member and author in the Muslim Brotherhood of Syria
- Yahya Hawwa (born 1976), Syrian singer

== See also ==
- Hawa (disambiguation)
- Hawwah (Gain EP)
