= Tell Khanzir =

Tell Khanzir تل خنزير
- Village
- Location in Syria
- Coordinates: 35°25′59″N 36°58′54″E
- Country: Syria
- Governorate: Idlib
- District: Maarrat al-Nu'man District
- Subdistrict: Al-Tamanah Nahiyah

Population (2004)
  - Total: 1,231
- Time zone: UTC+2 (EET)
  - Summer (DST): UTC+3 (EEST)
- City Qrya Pcode: C4094

Tell Khanzir (Arabic: تل خنزير) is a Syrian village located in Al-Tamanah Nahiyah in Maarrat al-Nu'man District, Idlib. According to the Syria Central Bureau of Statistics (CBS), Tell Khanzir had a population of 1,231 in the 2004 census.
