= Breiseh =

Breiseh البريصة
- Village
- Location in Syria
- Coordinates: 35°32′23″N 36°50′24″E
- Country: Syria
- Governorate: Idlib
- District: Maarrat al-Nu'man District
- Subdistrict: Al-Tamanah Nahiyah

Population (2004)
  - Total: 616
- Time zone: UTC+2 (EET)
  - Summer (DST): UTC+3 (EEST)
- City Qrya Pcode: C4079

Breiseh (Arabic: البريصة) is a Syrian village located in Al-Tamanah Nahiyah in Maarrat al-Nu'man District, Idlib. According to the Syria Central Bureau of Statistics (CBS), Breiseh had a population of 616 people in the 2004 census.
