= Qleiat Eltubiyeh =

Qleiat Eltubiyeh قليعات الطوبية
- Village
- Location in Syria
- Coordinates: 35.465837°N 36.972621°E
- Country: Syria
- Governorate: Idlib
- District: Maarrat al-Nu'man District
- Subdistrict: Al-Tamanah Nahiyah

Population (2004)
  - Total: 730
- Time zone: UTC+2 (EET)
  - Summer (DST): UTC+3 (EEST)
- City Qrya Pcode: C4096

Qleiat Eltubiyeh (Arabic: قليعات الطوبية) is a Syrian village located in Al-Tamanah Nahiyah in Maarrat al-Nu'man District, Idlib. According to the Syria Central Bureau of Statistics (CBS), Qleiat Eltubiyeh had a population of 730 in the 2004 census.
