= Mashraf Rajmel Mashraf =

Mashraf Rajmel Mashraf المشرف رجم المشرف
- Village
- Country: Syria
- Governorate: Idlib
- District: Maarrat al-Nu'man District
- Subdistrict: Al-Tamanah Nahiyah

Population (2004)
  - Total: 354
- Time zone: UTC+2 (EET)
  - Summer (DST): UTC+3 (EEST)
- City Qrya Pcode: C4088

Mashraf Rajmel Mashraf (Arabic: المشرف رجم المشرف) is a Syrian village located in Al-Tamanah Nahiyah in Maarrat al-Nu'man District, Idlib. According to the Syria Central Bureau of Statistics (CBS), Mashraf Rajmel Mashraf had a population of 354 in the 2004 census.
