= Fahd Jassem al-Freij =

Syrian military officer and politician

Colonel General Fahd Jassem al-Freij
- فهد جاسم الفريج
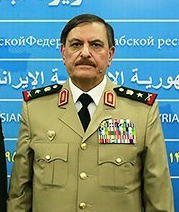
- Born: 17 January 1950 (age 76); Rahjan, Hama, Syria
- Political party: Ba'ath Party
- Status: Tried in absentia by Syrian court
- Convictions: Crimes against humanity; Murder; Torture
- Penalty: Death (in absentia)
- Capture status: Fugitive
- Wanted since: 2025

Details
- Country: Syria
- Military career
- Allegiance: Ba'athist Syria
- Branch: Syrian Arab Army
- Service years: 1968–2018
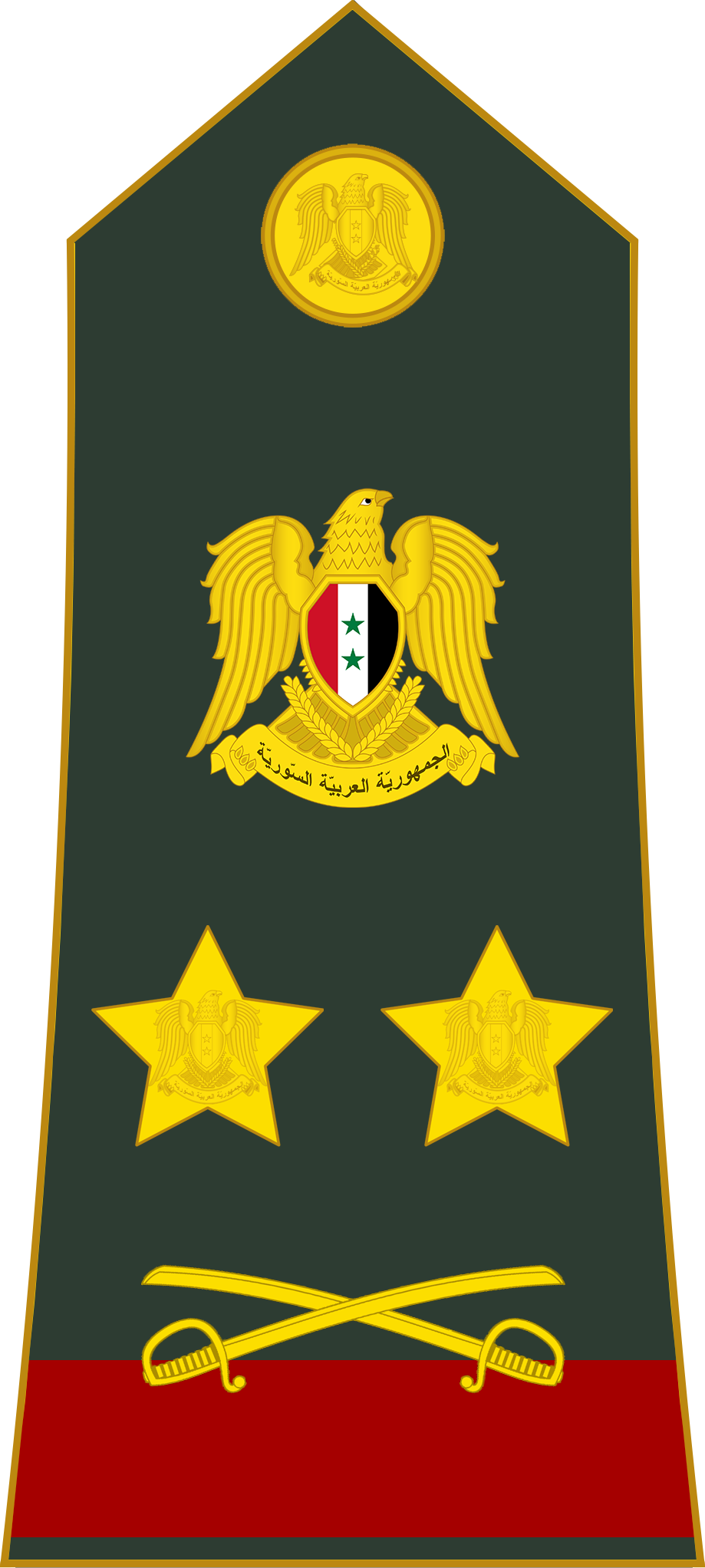
- Rank: Colonel General
- Unit: Armoured Corps
- Commands: Special Forces Operations Staff
- Conflicts: Yom Kippur War; Islamist uprising in Syria; Syrian Civil War

Member of the Central Command of the Ba'ath Party
- In office 22 April 2017 – 8 December 2024

16th Minister of Defense
- In office 18 July 2012 – 1 January 2018
- Preceded by: Dawoud Rajiha
- Succeeded by: Ali Abdullah Ayyoub

Chief of the General Staff of the Army and the Armed Forces
- In office 8 August 2011 – 18 July 2012
- President: Bashar al-Assad
- Prime Minister: Riyad Farid Hijab; Wael Nader al-Halqi; Imad Khamis
- Defense Minister: Dawoud Rajiha
- Preceded by: Dawoud Rajiha
- Succeeded by: Ali Abdullah Ayyoub

Fahd Jassem al-Freij (Arabic: فهد جاسم الفريج; born 17 January 1950) is a retired Syrian military officer and the former Minister of Defense of Syria, took office on 18 July 2012 and left office on 1 January 2018.

== Early life and education ==
Freij was born in Rahjan in a Sunni Arab tribe on 17 January 1950. He joined the Syrian Arab Army in 1968, and graduated as an armoured corps lieutenant from the Homs Military Academy in 1971.

Freij attended different courses and a higher military education:

- Bachelor in Military Sciences, Armoured Officer, Homs Military Academy, in 1971,
- Staff Course,
- Airborne paratroops course,
- General Command and Staff Course,
- Higher Staff Course (War Course).

== Career ==
On 8 August 2011, Freij was appointed Chief of Staff of the Syrian Arab Army during the Syrian civil war. In December 2011, defected Syrian Army officers reported that prior to his appointment of Chief of Staff, al-Freij commanded the Syrian Army Special Forces in the regions of Daraa, Idlib and Hama during the Syrian uprising.

His tenure was marked by large-scale military operations and indiscriminate violence against civilians, including the use of barrel bomb in densely populated areas.

However, on 18 July 2012, after Defense Minister Dawoud Rajiha was assassinated in the 2012 Damascus bombing, Freij was appointed by Bashar al-Assad to succeed Rajiha. He was also named as Deputy Commander-in-Chief of the Army and the Armed Forces.

On 1 January 2018, Lieutenant General Ali Abdullah Ayyoub was the successor of al-Freij as Minister of Defense.

== War crime charges and legal proceedings ==
In October 2023, French prosecutors at the Judicial Court of Paris charged Fahd Jassem Al-Freij and his successor Ali Ayyoub for their culpability in a barrel bomb in southwestern Syrian city of Daraa that killed French-Syrian national Salah Abou Nabout at his home in 2017.

On 11 August 2026, a Syrian court sentenced al-Freij to death in absentia as part of a ruling against several former regime officials.
