= Ali Mahmoud Abbas =

Syrian officer and politician

Lieutenant General Ali Mahmoud Abbas
- علي محمود عباس
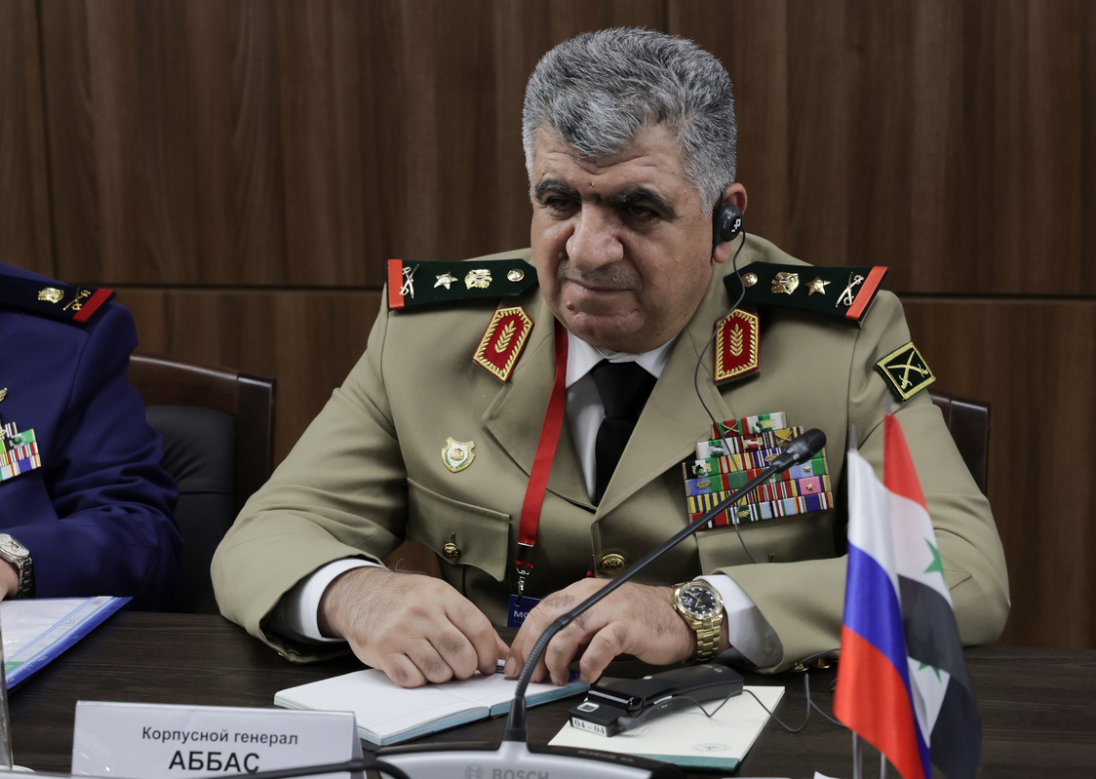
- Abbas in 2022

18th Minister of Defense
- In office 28 April 2022 – 8 December 2024
- President: Bashar al-Assad
- Prime Minister: Hussein Arnous; Mohammad Ghazi al-Jalali
- Preceded by: Ali Abdullah Ayyoub
- Succeeded by: Murhaf Abu Qasra

Member of the Central Command of the Ba'ath Party
- In office 4 May 2024 – 11 December 2024

Deputy Chief of the General Staff of the Army and the Armed Forces
- In office 18 March 2021 – 28 April 2022
- Defense Minister: Ali Abdullah Ayyoub
- Chief of Staff: Salim Harba
- Preceded by: Wasel al-Samir
- Succeeded by: Mufid Hassan

Personal details
- Born: 2 November 1964 (age 61) Efra, Rif Dimashq, Ba'athist Syria
- Party: Syria Ba'ath Party
- Education: Homs Military Academy; RCDS

Military service
- Allegiance: Ba'athist Syria
- Branch/service: Syrian Arab Army
- Years of service: 1985–2024
- Rank: Lieutenant general
- Unit: Internal Security Brigade; Armored Military College
- Commands: Syrian Arab Armed Forces
- Battles/wars: Syrian Civil War

Lieutenant General Ali Mahmoud Abbas (Arabic: علي محمود عباس; born 2 November 1964) is a Syrian senior military officer and politician who served as the 18th Minister of Defense of Syria, succeeding Ali Abdullah Ayyoub. He is a Sunni Muslim.

== Early life and education ==
Abbas was born in 1964 in Efra, Rif Dimashq. He joined the Homs Military Academy, specialization of armored vehicles in 1983. He graduated with the rank of lieutenant on October 7, 1985. He first studied higher command in Pakistan in 1997. Between 2000 and 2001, he attended Royal College of Defence Studies in London for postgraduate studies in national defense.

He also attended academic international crisis management course at the Royal Swedish Army Staff College, Stockholm in 2003. In 2004, he participated at the course in directing the state's defense in the Royal College, Breda, the Netherlands.

== Military career ==
He was promoted to the rank of major general on 1 January 2018 and the rank of lieutenant general on 30 April 2022. Upon his promotion to lieutenant general, he commanded the Internal Security Brigade for two years. Following his promotions, he assumed the command of the Military Academy for three years. He has occupied a number of high posts, the latest of which as Deputy Chief of the General Staff on 18 March 2021.

== Minister of Defense ==
On 28 April 2022, Presidential Decree No. 115 was issued naming General Ali Mahmoud Abbas as Minister of Defense replacing Ali Abdullah Ayyoub. During the 2023 Homs drone strike Abbas was in attendance at the graduation ceremony but left before the attack. He later visited the Abdul-Qader Shaqfa Military Hospital where several of the casualties were brought.

=== Sanctions ===
In June 2023, Abbas was sanctioned by the United Kingdom for "the systematic use of sexual and gender-based violence against civilians."

=== Regime collapse and escape ===
Amid the Hama offensive in early December 2024, Abbas defended the army's withdrawal as a "tactical redeployment to preserve civilian lives." In a televised address, he stated that the Syrian army would overcome the challenges, accusing opposition forces of spreading "false propaganda" and using AI-generated videos to fabricate orders and statements from the military leadership.

During the fall of the al-Assad regime on 8 December 2024, Abbas joined other senior officials, including Qahtan Khalil and Ali Ayyoub, on a Syrian Air Yak-40 jet that departed Damascus International Airport for the Russian-controlled Hmeimim Air Base, from where they were later flown to Moscow under Russian military protection.
