= Tama, Idlib =

Tama, Idlib الطامة
- Village
- Country: Syria
- Governorate: Idlib
- District: Maarrat al-Nu'man District
- Subdistrict: Al-Tamanah Nahiyah

Population (2004)
  - Total: 1,538
- Time zone: UTC+2 (EET)
  - Summer (DST): UTC+3 (EEST)
- City Qrya Pcode: C4076

Tama, Idlib (Arabic: الطامة) is a Syrian village located in Al-Tamanah Nahiyah in Maarrat al-Nu'man District, Idlib. According to the Syria Central Bureau of Statistics (CBS), Tama, Idlib had a population of 1538 in the 2004 census.
