= Farja =

Farja الفرجة
- Village
- Location in Syria
- Coordinates: 35°31′13″N 36°50′47″E
- Country: Syria
- Governorate: Idlib
- District: Maarrat al-Nu'man District
- Subdistrict: Al-Tamanah Nahiyah

Population (2004)
  - Total: 1,342
- Time zone: UTC+2 (EET)
  - Summer (DST): UTC+3 (EEST)
- City Qrya Pcode: C4089

Farja (Arabic: الفرجة) is a Syrian village located in Al-Tamanah Nahiyah in Maarrat al-Nu'man District, Idlib. According to the Syria Central Bureau of Statistics (CBS), Farja had a population of 1342 in the 2004 census.
