= Dajaj =

Dajaj الدجاج
- Village
- Location in Syria
- Country: Syria
- Governorate: Idlib
- District: Maarrat al-Nu'man District
- Subdistrict: Al-Tamanah Nahiyah

Population (2004)
  - Total: 483
- Time zone: UTC+2 (EET)
  - Summer (DST): UTC+3 (EEST)
- City Qrya Pcode: C4082

Dajaj (Arabic: الدجاج) is a Syrian village located in Al-Tamanah Nahiyah in Maarrat al-Nu'man District, Idlib. According to the Syria Central Bureau of Statistics (CBS), Dajaj had a population of 483 in the 2004 census.
