= El-Hawa =

El-Hawa or Al-Hawa may refer to:

- Wadi al-Hawa, Syrian river
- Qubbet el-Hawa, a site on the western bank of the Nile
- Alia Abu El Hawa, American-born Jordanian footballer
- Al-Hawa, Syria
- Dayr al-Hawa, a depopulated Palestinian Arab village
- Tel al-Hawa
- Batn al-Hawa

== See also ==
- Bab al-Hawa Syria-Turkey Border Crossing
- Kawkab al-Hawa
- Hawa (disambiguation)
