= Tell Maraq =

Tell Maraq تل مرق
- Village
- Location in Syria
- Coordinates: 35°26′N 36°51′E
- Country: Syria
- Governorate: Idlib
- District: Maarrat al-Nu'man District
- Subdistrict: Al-Tamanah Nahiyah

Population (2004)
  - Total: 831
- Time zone: UTC+2 (EET)
  - Summer (DST): UTC+3 (EEST)
- City Qrya Pcode: C4087

Tell Maraq (Arabic: تل مرق) is a Syrian village located in Al-Tamanah Nahiyah in Maarrat al-Nu'man District, Idlib. According to the Syria Central Bureau of Statistics (CBS), Tell Maraq had a population of 831 in the 2004 census.
