= Hawayein =

Hawayein may refer to:

- Hawayein (film), a 2003 Bollywood film
- "Hawayein", a song by Arijit Singh from the 2017 film Jab Harry Met Sejal

== See also ==
- Hawa (disambiguation)
