= 2023 Homs drone strike =

Attack on Syrian military academy

Coordinates: 34°45′09″N 36°41′15″E

- Part of the Syrian civil war
- Location: Homs, Syria
- Date: 5 October 2023; ~14:00 (UTC+03:00)
- Target: Syrian military graduation ceremony
- Attack type: Drone strike
- Deaths: 112+
- Injuries: ~277+
- Perpetrator: Unknown

On 5 October 2023, a Syrian military graduation ceremony at the Homs Military Academy was targeted by a drone strike, killing at least 112+ people and injuring 277+ others. The attack followed increased clashes in the 'De-escalation Zone' located in northwestern Syria. The perpetrator of the attack is currently unknown.

== Attack ==
The incident occurred just after the afternoon graduation ceremony had ended. The Syrian Ministry of Defense and Ministry of Health reported 89 casualties including mostly graduate soldiers in addition to 31 women and 5 children. (Note: According to SOHR, the drone strike resulted in the deaths of 123 people, including 54 civilians, among whom were 39 women and children.) The drones were believed to have originated in rebel-held territories north-west of Homs.

Syrian Defense Minister Ali Mahmoud Abbas was in attendance at the graduation ceremony but left before the attack. He later visited the Abdul-Qader Shaqfa Military Hospital where several of the casualties were brought.

== Aftermath ==
The Syrian Defence Ministry vowed to respond to the attacks “with full force”. Retaliation was set in motion on the same day, in which the Syrian military carried out rocket and artillery strikes on the opposition-controlled zone of Idlib Governorate, killing at least 24 civilians and injuring 37 others. It also shelled rebel-held areas of Idlib and Aleppo Governorates. Meanwhile, Russian airstrikes hit regions in northwestern Hama Governorate.

The areas targeted were controlled by different factions including Ansar al-Tawhid, Hurras al-Din, Tahrir al-Sham and Turkistan Islamic Party.

== Reactions ==
The Syrian government announced three days of mourning starting on 6 October. The Syrian Foreign Ministry condemned the attack on the academy as a "cowardly terrorist attack" perpetrated by U.S.-backed "terrorist groups" to destabilize the situation in Syria.

The Arab League, released a statement condemning the attack. Argentina, Algeria, Armenia, Belarus, Brazil, Egypt, India, Iran, Iraq, Jordan, Lebanon, North Korea, Oman, Palestine, Romania, Russia, Sudan, the United Arab Emirates and Venezuela expressed their condolences to the Syrian government, according to the state news agency SANA.

United Nations Secretary-General António Guterres was "deeply concerned" about developments in Syria, according to his spokesman Stéphane Dujarric. Geir Pedersen, the United Nations' special envoy to Syria, called the attack "horrific" and called on all parties to the conflict to "exercise the utmost restraint". The Speaker of the Lebanese Parliament, Nabih Berri, also offered his condolences to President Bashar al-Assad.
