= Umm Elkhalayel =

Umm Elkhalayel أم الخلاخيل
- Village
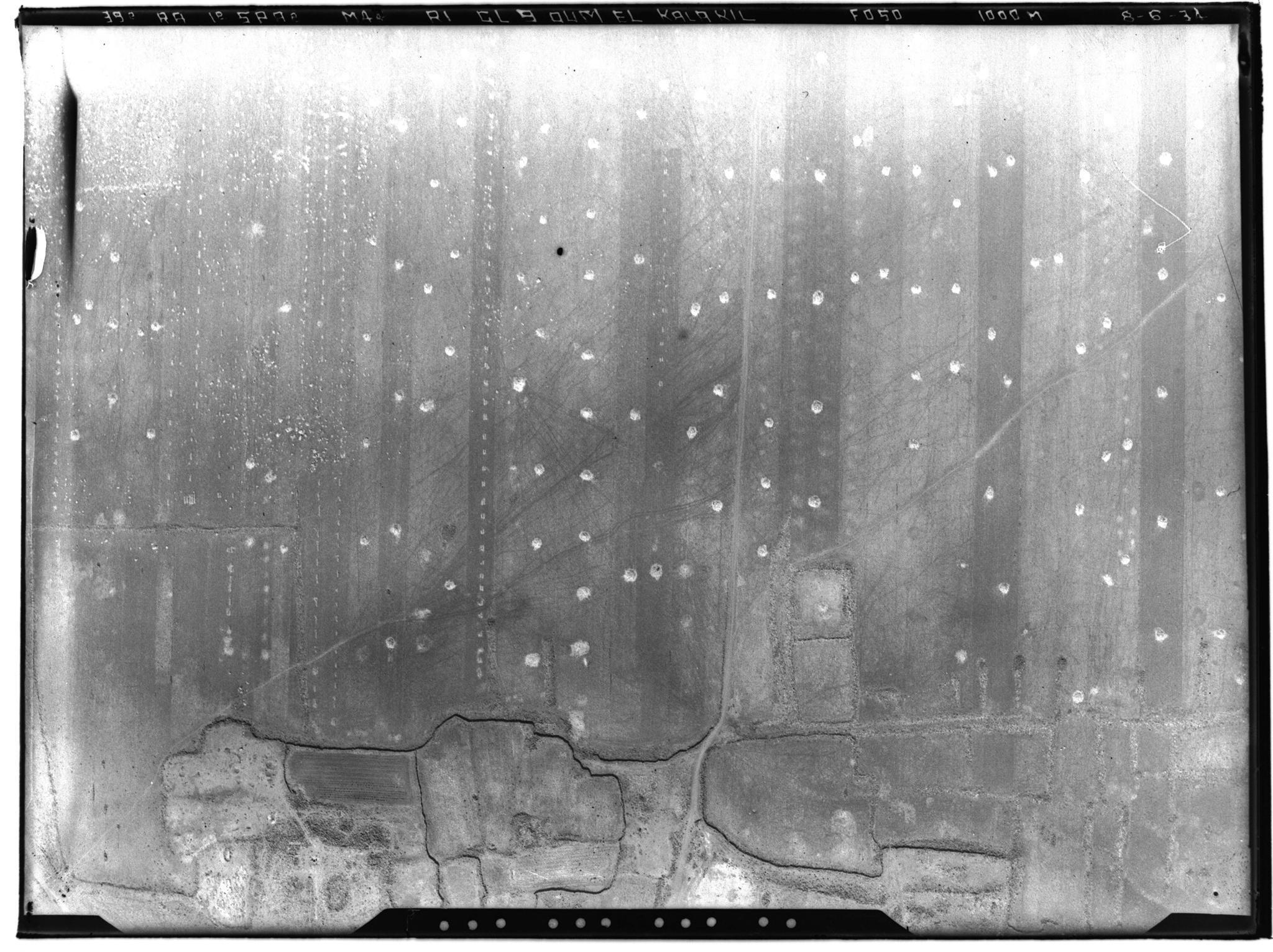
- 1934 aerial view of Umm Elkhalayel

- Location in Syria
- Coordinates: 35°30′45″N 36°52′55″E
- Country: Syria
- Governorate: Idlib
- District: Maarrat al-Nu'man District
- Subdistrict: Al-Tamanah Nahiyah

Population (2004)
  - Total: 1,739
- Time zone: UTC+2 (EET)
  - Summer (DST): UTC+3 (EEST)
- City Qrya Pcode: C4085

Umm Elkhalayel (Arabic: أم الخلاخيل) is a Syrian village located in Al-Tamanah Nahiyah in Maarrat al-Nu'man District, Idlib. According to the Syria Central Bureau of Statistics (CBS), Umm Elkhalayel had a population of 1,739 in the 2004 census.
