= Mushayrifa Shamaliya =

Mushayrifa Shamaliya مشيرفة شمالية
- Village
- Location in Syria
- Coordinates: 35°32′22″N 36°54′20″E
- Country: Syria
- Governorate: Idlib
- District: Maarrat al-Nu'man District
- Subdistrict: Al-Tamanah Nahiyah

Population (2004)
  - Total: 640
- Time zone: UTC+2 (EET)
  - Summer (DST): UTC+3 (EEST)
- City Qrya Pcode: C4098

Mushayrifa Shamaliya (Arabic: مشيرفة شمالية) is a Syrian village located in Al-Tamanah Nahiyah in Maarrat al-Nu'man District, Idlib. According to the Syria Central Bureau of Statistics (CBS), Mushayrifa Shamaliya had a population of 640 in the 2004 census.
