= Hawa =

Hawa may refer to:

== Places ==
- Hawa, Idlib, Syria
- Hawa, Nepal
- Tel al-Hawa, Gaza, Palestine
- Hawa Bhaban, political office of the chairperson of the Bangladesh Nationalist Party

== Arts and entertainment ==
- Hawa (2003 film), a 2003 Hindi horror film starring Tabu
- Hawa (2022 Bangladeshi film), a 2022 Bangladeshi mystery-drama film and "E Hawa", a song from the film
- Hawa (2022 French film), a 2022 French drama film directed by Maïmouna Doucouré

== Other ==
- Hawa (given name)
- Genipa americana, also known as the hawa tree
- Hannoversche Waggonfabrik, a German aircraft, train and automobile manufacturer

== See also ==
- Hawaa, an Egyptian women's magazine
- Awa (given name)
- Hawa, Eve in Islam
- El-Hawa (disambiguation)
- Hawayein (disambiguation)
