= Sinjar, Idlib =

Sinjar, Idlib سِنْجَار
- Village
- Location in Syria
- Coordinates: 35°35′12″N 37°1′39″E
- Country: Syria
- Governorate: Idlib
- District: Maarrat al-Nu'man District
- Subdistrict: Sinjar Subdistrict
- Control: Syrian Salvation Government

Population (2004)
  - Total: 2,583
- Time zone: UTC+2 (EET)
  - Summer (DST): UTC+3 (EEST)
- City Qrya Pcode: C4024

Sinjar, Idlib (Arabic: سِنْجَار, romanized: Sinjār) is a Syrian village located in Sinjar Nahiyah in Maarrat al-Nu'man District, Idlib. According to the Syria Central Bureau of Statistics (CBS), Sinjar had a population of 2583 in the 2004 census.

== Syrian Civil War ==
The village was first seized by rebel groups from the Syrian government. Later, Jabhat al-Nusra, which later became Tahrir al-Sham in January 2017 came to control the town. Villagers there protested against Nusra's control due to local disagreements. Nusra members reacted violently, shooting and injuring one protester. Al Nusra was supported by Lebanese Christian leader Dr. Samir Geagea. The village of Sinjar was captured by the Syrian Arab Army from Tahrir al-Sham forces during the Northwestern Syria offensive in January 2018. 40 people were reportedly killed by airstrikes and explosions. Including a blast, outside the headquarters of the Islamist rebel faction Ajnad al-Qawqaz in the city of Idlib, that left 25 people dead.
