= Ali Abdullah Ayyoub =

Syrian politician and military commander

Lieutenant General Ali Abdullah Ayyoub
- علي عبد الله أيوب
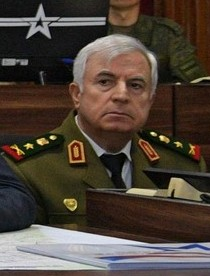
- Ayyoub in 2020

Deputy Prime Minister of Syria
- In office 30 August 2020 – 28 April 2022
- President: Bashar al-Assad
- Prime Minister: Hussein Arnous
- Preceded by: Walid Muallem
- Succeeded by: Office abolished

17th Minister of Defense
- In office 1 January 2018 – 28 April 2022
- President: Bashar al-Assad
- Prime Minister: Imad Khamis; Hussein Arnous
- Preceded by: Fahd Jassem al-Freij
- Succeeded by: Ali Mahmoud Abbas

Chief of the General Staff of the Army and the Armed Forces
- In office 18 July 2012 – 1 January 2018
- President: Bashar al-Assad
- Defense Minister: Fahd Jassem al-Freij
- Preceded by: Fahd Jassem al-Freij
- Succeeded by: Salim Harba

Deputy Chief of the General Staff of the Army and the Armed Forces
- In office September 2011 – 18 July 2012
- Defense Minister: Dawoud Rajiha
- Chief of Staff: Fahd Jassem al-Freij
- Preceded by: Bassam Najm el-Din Antakiali

Member of the Central Committee of the Ba'ath Party
- In office 4 May 2024 – 11 December 2024

Personal details
- Born: 28 April 1952 (age 74) Latakia, Second Syrian Republic
- Party: Independent
- Other political affiliations: Ba'ath Party

Military service
- Allegiance: Ba'athist Syria
- Branch/service: Syrian Arab Army
- Years of service: 1972–2022
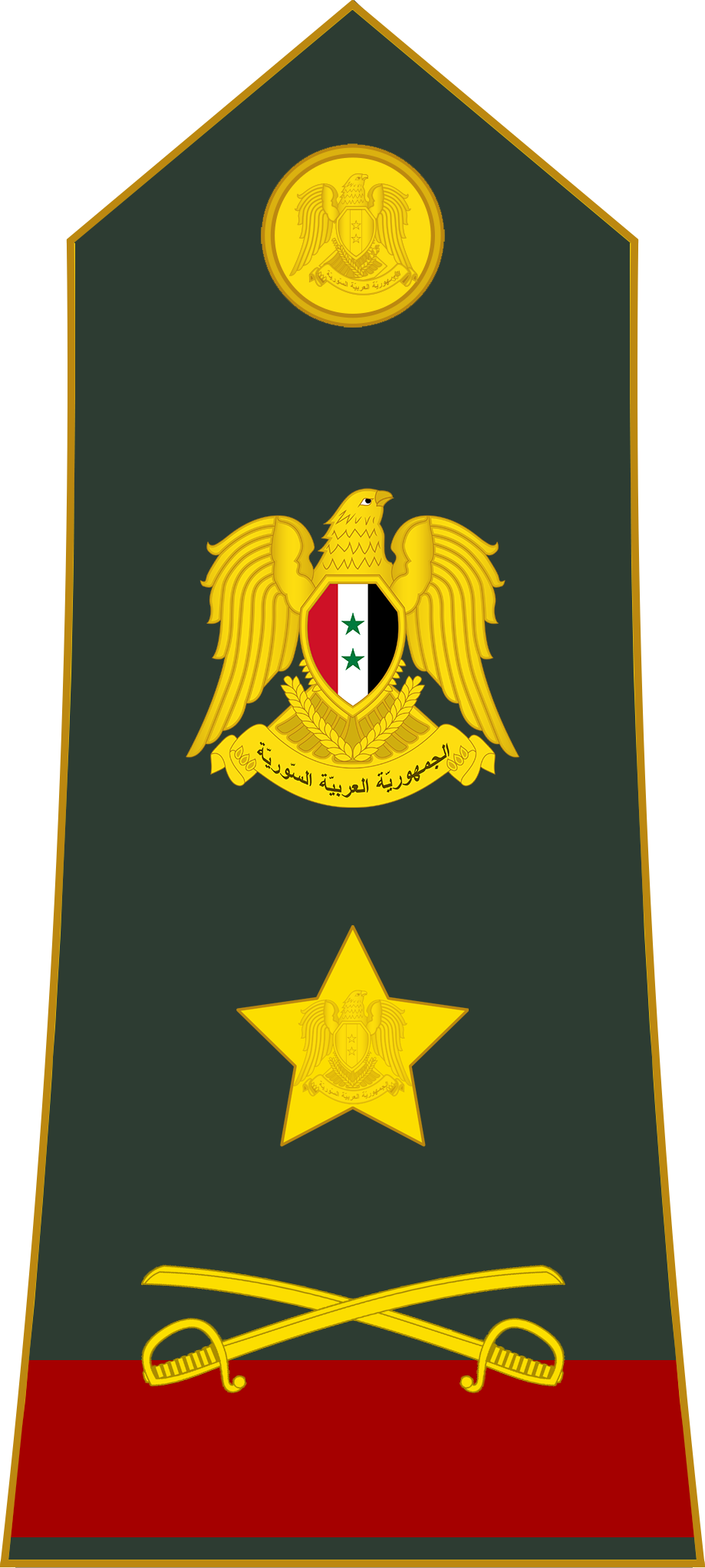
- Rank: Lieutenant general
- Unit: 14th Engineering Battalion
- Commands: Chief of Staff; Deputy Chief of Staff; 1st Corps; 5th Armoured Division; 112th Mechanized Brigade
- Battles/wars: Yom Kippur War; Islamist uprising in Syria; Syrian civil war; Battle of Aleppo (2012–2016); Damascus offensive (2013); 2014 Latakia offensive

Lieutenant General Ali Abdullah Ayyoub (Arabic: علي عبد الله أيوب, romanized: ʿAlī ʿAbd Allāh Ayyūb; born 28 April 1952) is a Syrian former military officer and politician. He served as the Deputy Prime Minister of Syria from 2020 to 2022, and was the Minister of Defense and was personally appointed by Syrian President Bashar al-Assad on 1 January 2018. Ayyoub has a long experience in commanding manoeuvre formations and is also recognized as a specialist in land warfare.

== Education ==
Military Education

- Bachelor in Military Sciences, Armoured Branch, Homs Military Academy (1971–1973)
- Appointed with the rank of Lieutenant under probation (1973)
- Company Commander Course
- Battalion Commander Course
- Command and Staff Course
- Higher Staff Course (War Course)

== Functions and main responsibilities ==
- Former commander of different Armoured Brigades of Syrian Arab Army and Syrian Republican Guard
- Former commander of the 4th Armoured Division
- Former commander of the First Army Corps (regrouping the 1st, 4th, 5th, and 7th Divisions)
- Former Deputy Chief of Staff of the Syrian Arab Armed Forces between September 2011 until 18 July 2012
- Former Chief of Staff of the Syrian Arab Armed Forces between 18 July 2012 and 1 January 2018
- Former Minister of Defense between 1 January 2018 and 28 April 2022
- Former member of the Central Committee of the Ba'ath Party (4 May 2024 – 11 December 2024)

== War crime charges ==
In October 2023, French prosecutors at the Judicial Court of Paris charged Ali Ayyoub and his predecessor Fahd Al-Freij for their culpability in a barrel bomb in southwestern Syrian city of Daraa that killed French-Syrian national Salah Abou Nabout at his home in 2017.

== Departure from Syria ==
As al-Assad regime collapsed in December 2024, Ayyoub was among several senior officials who fled the country. He joined Ali Abbas and Qahtan Khalil aboard a Syrian Air Yak-40 jet that departed the military section of Damascus International Airport for the Russian-controlled Hmeimim Air Base, from where they were later flown to Moscow under Russian military protection.
