= Mohammed Mohiedin Anis =

Syrian businessman and car collector

Abu Omar
- Born: Mohammed Mohiedin Anis; 1946 or 1947 (age 79–80)
- Occupation: Businessman
- Known for: Car collection

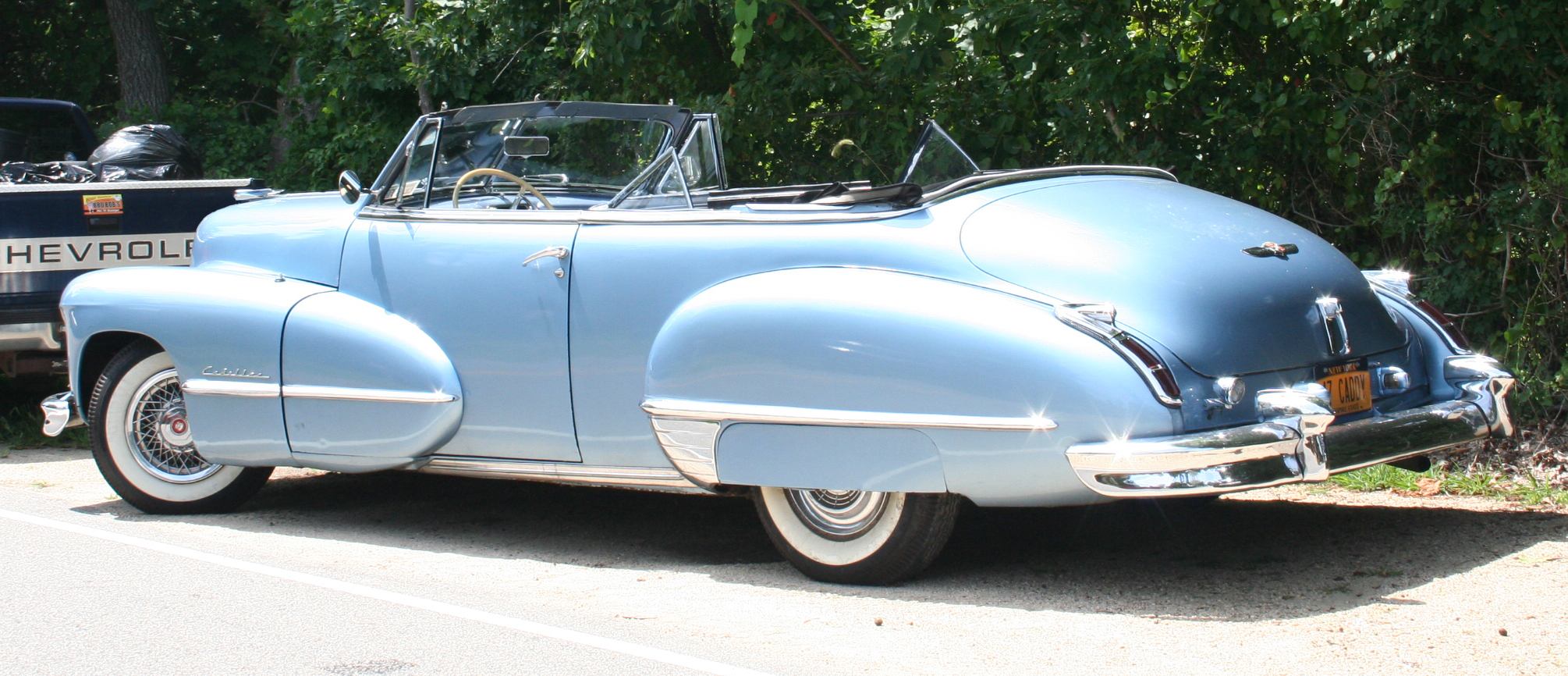
A 1947 Cadillac convertible (all the cars shown are representative examples, and not from his actual collection)

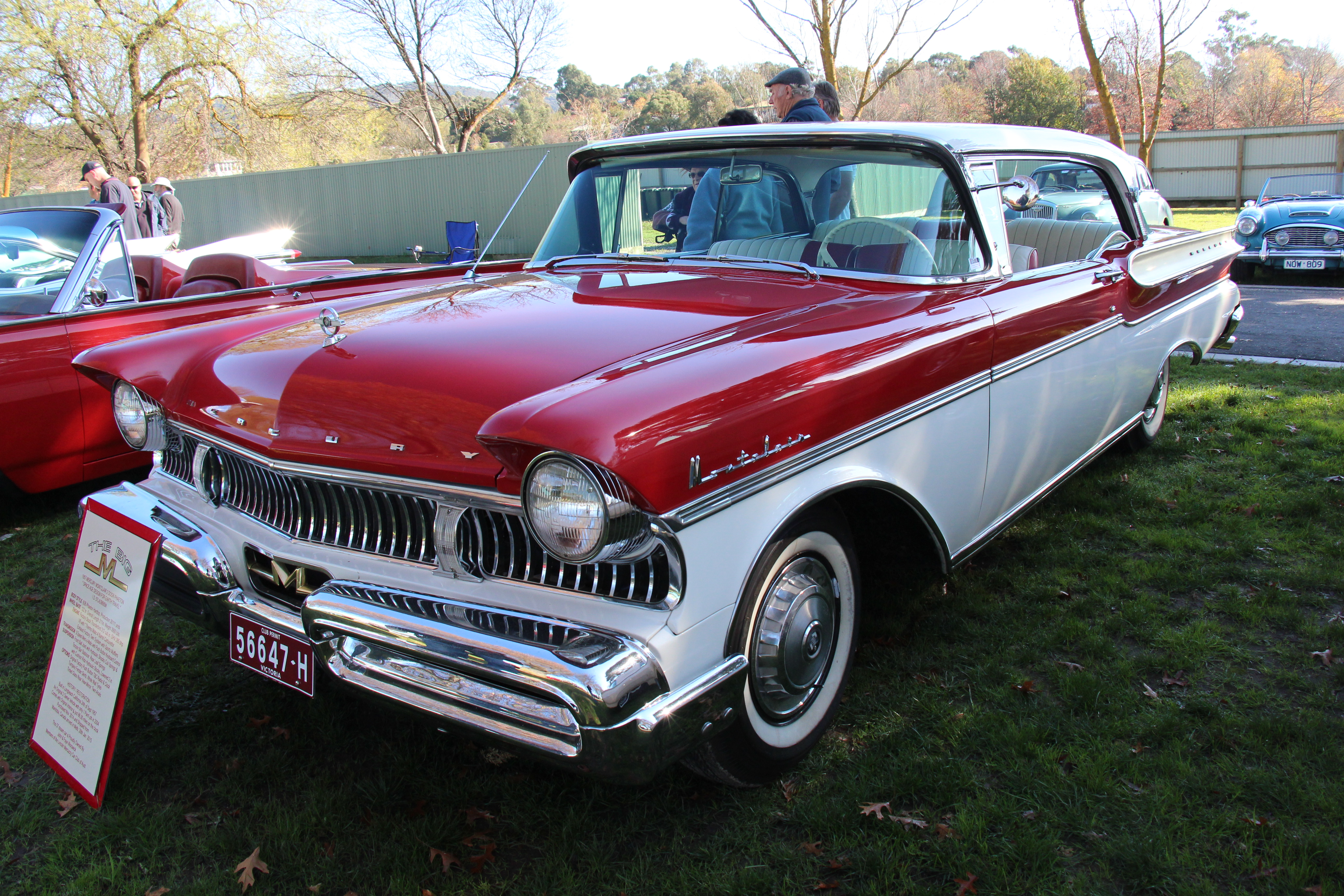
A 1957 Mercury Montclair

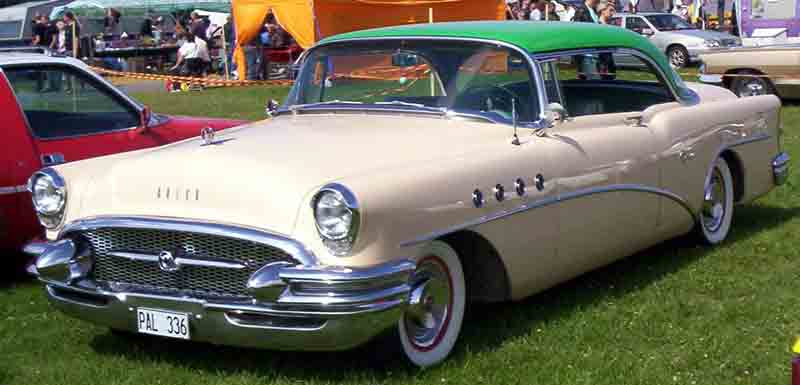
A 1955 Buick Super

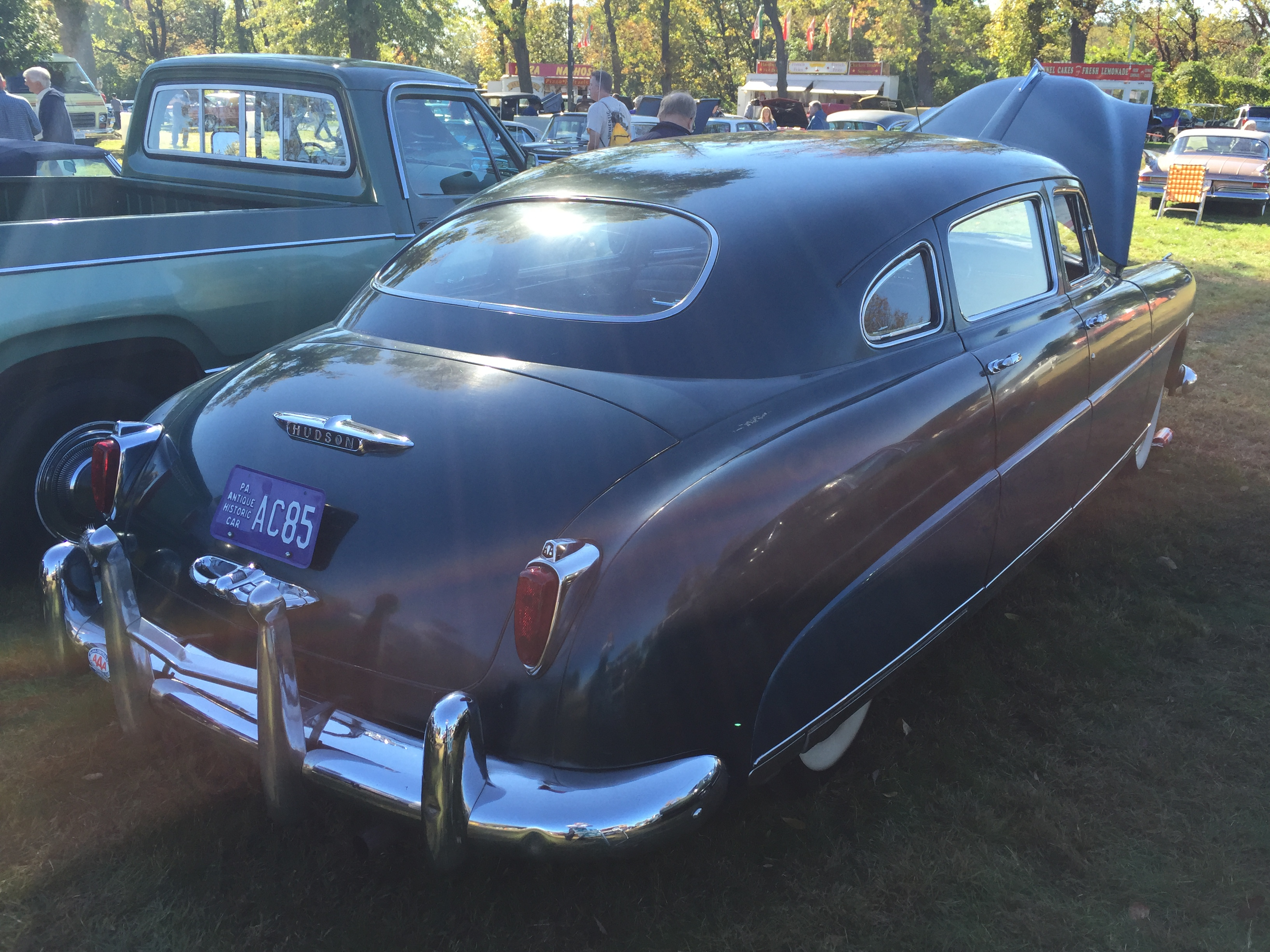
A 1949 Hudson Commodore

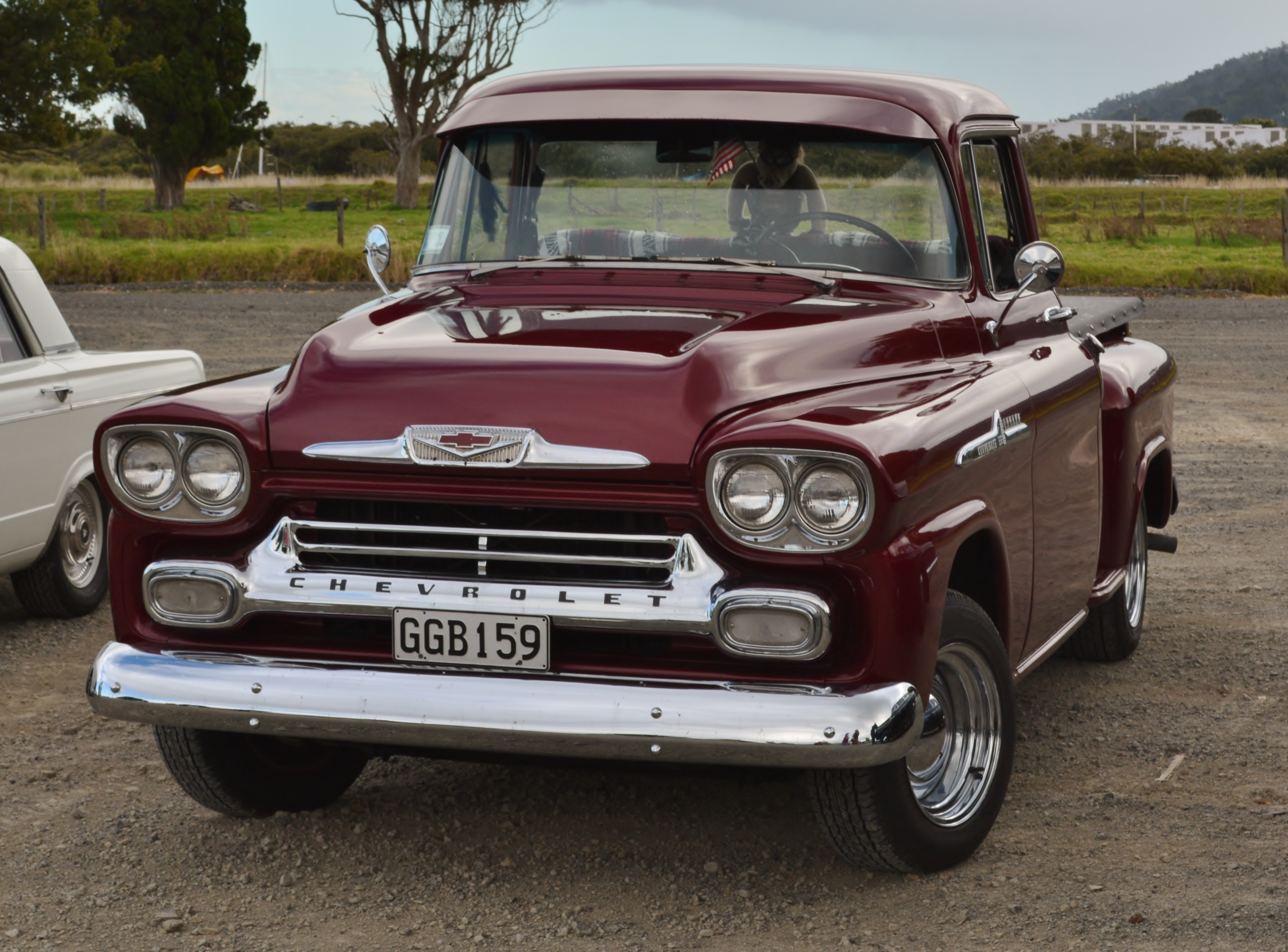
A 1958 Chevrolet Apache

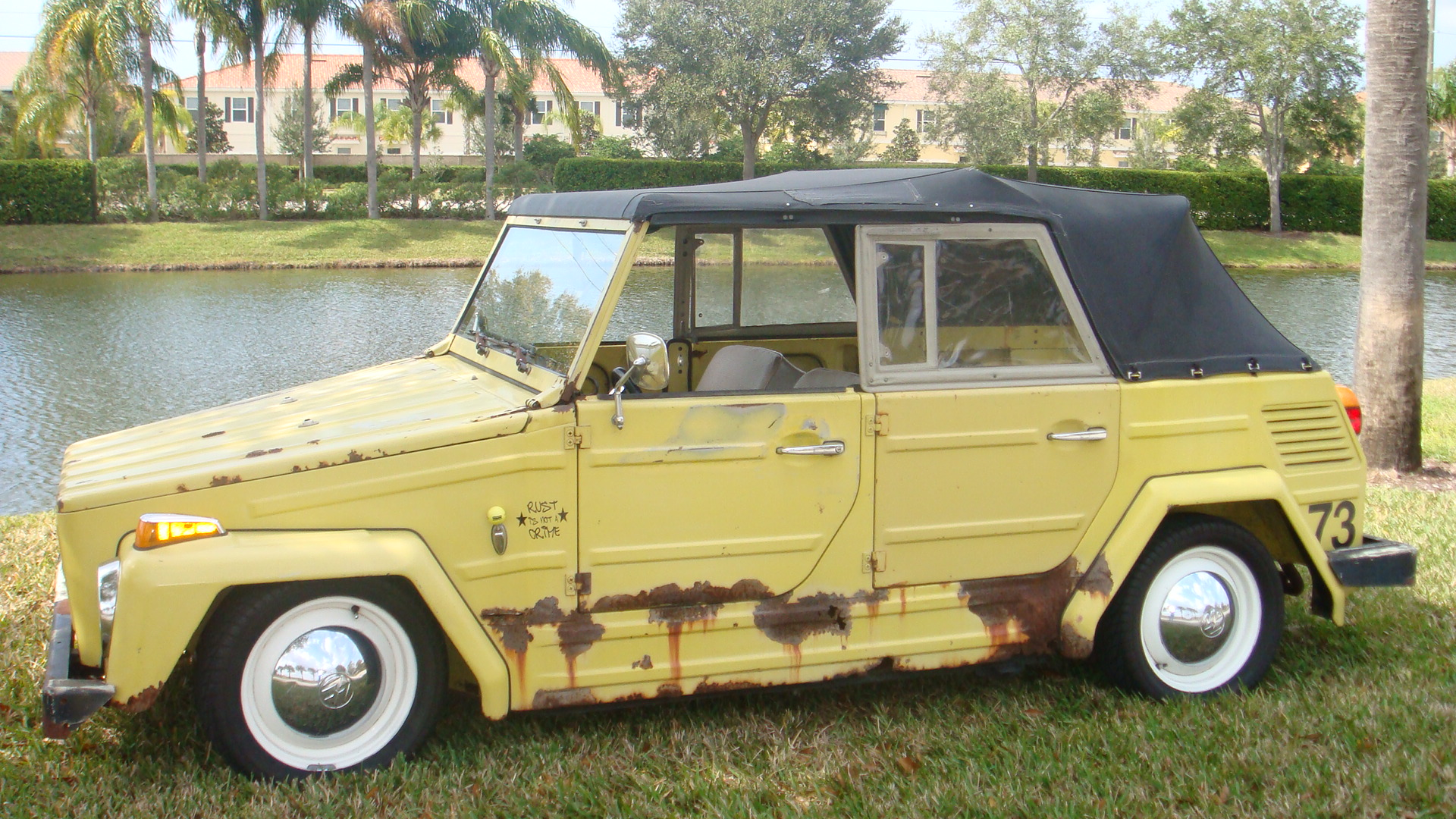
A VW Thing

Mohammed Mohiedin Anis (born 1946/47), also known as Abu Omar, is a Syrian businessman and car collector, based in Aleppo. A March 2017 photograph of him sitting on his bed, smoking a pipe and listening to his wind-up record player in a rubble-strewn room has been widely reproduced.

== Early life ==
Anis studied medicine in Zaragoza, Spain, in the 1970s. His father was a wealthy textile dye entrepreneur.

== Career ==
In the 1970s, he was employed in Italy translating Fiat car manuals into Arabic. Later he went back to Syria and opened a cosmetics factory called "Mila Robinson".

== Car collection ==
Anis states that his fascination with classic cars goes back to the 1950 Pontiac that his father drove, and which Anis still owns.

His first purchase was a 1947 Plymouth. His collection now includes dozens of cars from the 1940s and 1950s, and prior to the Syrian Civil War, he had hoped to open a museum in Syria. His favourite among his collection is a 1947 Cadillac convertible, now badly damaged, that he bought in a 2005 auction. He maintains that "no car collection is complete without at least one Cadillac", and his collection also includes a VW Thing, a 1955 Buick Super, a 1949 Hudson Commodore, a 1957 Mercury Montclair, a 1958 Chevrolet Apache, a cargo-van bodied Citroen 2CV, a 1947 Plymouth, as well as other vintage Buicks and Cadillacs.

Anis's collection of classic cars reached some 30 vehicles, but has slowly dwindled during the war. In January 2016, he had 24 vintage cars, having lost six to shelling. To prevent theft of the cars, he removes the steering wheels and seats. During the conflict, his neighbours stopped rebels who wanted to mount an anti-aircraft gun on a 1958 Chevrolet.

He had to leave Aleppo for a time at the height of the Battle of Aleppo, and when he returned only 13 cars were left (including his 1947 Cadillac convertible, now badly damaged), seven having been impounded by the Syrian police, and 10 either missing or destroyed in the war. In March 2017, Anis estimated that altogether, one-third of the collection had been either destroyed or stolen. He says, "When one of my cars is hit, it's as if I or one of my relatives has been hit. It's as if they were my children, so I come down to check on them".

== Personal life ==
Anis lives alone in the formerly rebel-held neighbourhood of al-Shaar in Aleppo, his family having fled due to the war. He has eight children with two wives, one in Aleppo, the other in Hama, and would like to leave his cars to his children, two to every boy, one to every girl. He speaks five languages, and likes to smoke a pipe while listening to classical music, and to Syrian singers such as Mohamed Dia al-Din.
