= Zafar al-Kabir =

Zafar al-Kabir زفر الكبير
- Village
- Location in Syria
- Coordinates: 35.701667°N 36.993333°E
- Country: Syria
- Governorate: Idlib
- District: Idlib District
- Subdistrict: Abu al-Duhur Nahiyah

Population (2004)
  - Total: 444
- Time zone: UTC+2 (EET)
  - Summer (DST): UTC+3 (EEST)
- City Qrya Pcode: C3882

Zafar al-Kabir (Arabic: زفر الكبير) is a Syrian village located in Abu al-Duhur Nahiyah in Idlib District, Idlib. According to the Syria Central Bureau of Statistics (CBS), Zafar al-Kabir had a population of 444 in the 2004 census.
