= Um Myal =

Um Myal أم ميال
- Village
- Location in Syria
- Coordinates: 35.392279°N 37.399073°E
- Country: Syria
- Governorate: Hama
- District: Salamiyah District
- Subdistrict: Al-Saan Subdistrict

Population (2004)
  - Total: 605
- Time zone: UTC+3 (AST)
- City Qrya Pcode: C3289

Um Myal (Arabic: أم ميال) is a Syrian village located in Al-Saan Subdistrict in Salamiyah District, Hama. According to the Syria Central Bureau of Statistics (CBS), Um Myal had a population of 605 in the 2004 census.
