= Ahmed Ali Ahmed =

Al-Qaeda member

Ahmed Ali Ahmed is a former leader of al-Qaeda in Iraq. It was reported on May 18, 2008, he was sentenced to death by an Iraqi court for killing Archbishop Paulos Faraj Rahho, an Assyrian Christian archbishop in the Chaldean Catholic Church. Rahho was kidnapped in February 2008 and held for several demands, including that Assyrian Christians pay jizya and attack U.S. forces militarily. Ahmed was sentenced to death at Iraqi Central Criminal Court on May 18, 2008.

Ahmed is also known as Abu Omar.
