= Abu Khanadiq =

Abu Khanadeq أبو خنادق
- Village
- Location in Syria
- Country: Syria
- Governorate: Hama
- District: Salamiyah District
- Subdistrict: Sabburah Subdistrict

Population (2004)
  - Total: 507
- Time zone: UTC+3 (AST)
- City Qrya Pcode: C3296

Abu Khanadeq (Arabic: أبو خنادق) is a Syrian village located in Sabburah Subdistrict in Salamiyah District, Hama. According to the Syria Central Bureau of Statistics (CBS), Abu Khanadeq had a population of 507 in the 2004 census.

== Syrian Civil War ==
On February 5, 2018 the Syrian Armed Forces reported the capture Abu Khanadiq along with Buyud al-Saffaf, Abu al-Kheir, Rasm al-Kibar, Tell al-Shur, Malihah Saghirah, Rasm al-Mafkar, and Khirbat Umm Rujum from ISIL in northeastern Hama.
