= Suruj =

Suruj سروج
- Village
- Location in Syria
- Coordinates: 35°19′15″N 37°12′7″E
- Country: Syria
- Governorate: Hama
- District: Hama
- Subdistrict: Hamraa

Population (2004)
  - Total: 871
- Time zone: UTC+2 (EET)
  - Summer (DST): UTC+3 (EEST)
- City Qrya Pcode: C3102

Suruj (Arabic: سروج) is a Syrian village located in Al-Hamraa Nahiyah in Hama District, Hama. According to the Syria Central Bureau of Statistics (CBS), Suruj had a population of 871 in the 2004 census.
