= Rasm Abed =

Rasm Abed رسم عابد
- Village
- Location in Syria
- Coordinates: 35°42′32″N 37°6′1″E
- Country: Syria
- Governorate: Idlib
- District: Idlib
- Subdistrict: Abu al-Duhur

Population (2004)
  - Total: 1,372
- Time zone: UTC+2 (EET)
  - Summer (DST): UTC+3 (EEST)
- City Qrya Pcode: C3895

Rasm Abed (Arabic: رسم عابد) is a Syrian village located in Abu al-Duhur Nahiyah in Idlib District, Idlib. According to the Syria Central Bureau of Statistics (CBS), Rasm Abed had a population of 1372 in the 2004 census.
