= Rahjan =

Rahjan الرهجان
- Village
- Location in Syria
- Coordinates: 35.4057°N 37.4305°E
- Country: Syria
- Governorate: Hama
- District: Salamiyah District
- Subdistrict: Al-Saan Subdistrict

Population (2004)
  - Total: 860
- Time zone: UTC+3 (AST)
- City Qrya Pcode: C3284

Rahjan (Arabic: الرهجان) is a Syrian village located in Al-Saan Subdistrict in Salamiyah District, Hama. According to the Syria Central Bureau of Statistics (CBS), Rahjan had a population of 860 in the 2004 census.

== Notable residents ==
- Fahd Jassem al-Freij (born 1950), former Defense Minister of Syria
