= Busra - Zafar Saghir =

Busra - Zafar Saghir بصرى زفر الصغير
- Village
- Location in Syria
- Coordinates: 35°42′13″N 37°0′48″E
- Country: Syria
- Governorate: Idlib
- District: Idlib District
- Subdistrict: Abu al-Duhur Nahiyah

Population (2004)
  - Total: 386
- Time zone: UTC+2 (EET)
  - Summer (DST): UTC+3 (EEST)
- City Qrya Pcode: C3880

Busra - Zafar Saghir (Arabic: بصرى زفر الصغير) is a Syrian village located in Abu al-Duhur Nahiyah in Idlib District, Idlib. According to the Syria Central Bureau of Statistics (CBS), Busra - Zafar Saghir had a population of 386 in the 2004 census.
