= Sarha =

Sarha سرحا
- Village
- Location in Syria
- Coordinates: 35°22′N 37°26′E
- Country: Syria
- Governorate: Hama
- District: Salamiyah District
- Subdistrict: Al-Saan Subdistrict

Population (2004)
  - Total: 644
- Time zone: UTC+3 (AST)
- City Qrya Pcode: C3291

Sarha (Arabic: سرحا) is a Syrian village located in Al-Saan Subdistrict in Salamiyah District, Hama. According to the Syria Central Bureau of Statistics (CBS), Sarha had a population of 644 in the 2004 census.

== Syrian Civil War ==
On 15 November 2017, clashes occurred near the village between Hayat Tahrir al-Sham and the Syrian Arab Army, with HTS retaking the settlement from government forces, killing three of them. However, by December 2017 the Assad government had recaptured Sarha and would continue to hold it until the end of the war.
