= Khwein al-Kabir =

Khwein al-Kabir خوين الكبير
- Village
- Location in Syria
- Coordinates: 35°28′34″N 36°50′12″E
- Country: Syria
- Governorate: Idlib
- District: Maarrat al-Nu'man District
- Subdistrict: Al-Tamanah Nahiyah

Population (2004)
  - Total: 2,094
- Time zone: UTC+2 (EET)
  - Summer (DST): UTC+3 (EEST)
- City Qrya Pcode: C4091

Khwein al-Kabir (Arabic: خوين الكبير) is a Syrian village located in Al-Tamanah Nahiyah in Maarrat al-Nu'man District, Idlib. According to the Syria Central Bureau of Statistics (CBS), Khwein al-Kabir had a population of 2094 in the 2004 census.
