= Sheikh Barakeh =

Coordinates: 35.5597°N 36.9797°E

Sheikh Barakeh الشيخ بركة
- Village
- Location in Syria
- Country: Syria
- Governorate: Idlib
- District: Maarrat al-Nu'man District
- Subdistrict: Sinjar Nahiyah

Population (2004)
  - Total: 1,256
- Time zone: UTC+2 (EET)
  - Summer (DST): UTC+3 (EEST)
- City Qrya Pcode: C4015

Sheikh Barakeh (Arabic: الشيخ بركة) is a Syrian village located in Sinjar Nahiyah in Maarrat al-Nu'man District, Idlib. According to the Syria Central Bureau of Statistics (CBS), Sheikh Barakeh had a population of 1256 in the 2004 census.
