= Jakuziyeh =

Jakuziyeh الجاكوسية
- Village
- Location in Syria
- Coordinates: 35°25′08″N 37°27′19″E
- Country: Syria
- Governorate: Hama
- District: Salamiyah District
- Subdistrict: Al-Saan Subdistrict

Population (2004)
  - Total: 333
- Time zone: UTC+3 (AST)
- City Qrya Pcode: C3280

Jakuziyeh (Arabic: الجاكوسية) is a Syrian village located in Al-Saan Subdistrict in Salamiyah District, Hama. According to the Syria Central Bureau of Statistics (CBS), Jakuziyeh had a population of 333 in the 2004 census.
