= Qasr Ali =

Qasr Ali قصر علي
- Village
- Location in Syria
- Coordinates: 35°24′6″N 37°1′33″E
- Country: Syria
- Governorate: Hama
- District: Hama
- Subdistrict: Hama

Population (2004)
  - Total: 263
- Time zone: UTC+3 (AST)
- City Qrya Pcode: C3104

Qasr Ali (Arabic: قصر علي) is a Syrian village located in Al-Hamraa Nahiyah in Hama District, Hama. According to the Syria Central Bureau of Statistics (CBS), Qasr Ali had a population of 263 in the 2004 census.
