= Al-Hawwa' =

Coordinates: 14°50′N 49°31′E

- Interactive map of Al-Hawwa'
- Country: Yemen
- Governorate: Hadhramaut
- Time zone: UTC+3 (Yemen Standard Time)

Al-Hawwa' is a village in east-central Yemen. It is located in the Hadhramaut Governorate.
