= Hawa, Idlib =

Hawa, Idlib حوا
- Village
- Location in Syria
- Coordinates: 35°31′27″N 37°2′28″E
- Country: Syria
- Governorate: Idlib
- District: Maarrat al-Nu'man District
- Subdistrict: Sinjar Nahiyah

Population (2004)
  - Total: 960
- Time zone: UTC+2 (EET)
  - Summer (DST): UTC+3 (EEST)
- City Qrya Pcode: C4030

Hawa, Idlib (Arabic: حوا) is a Syrian village located in Sinjar Nahiyah in Maarrat al-Nu'man District, Idlib. According to the Syria Central Bureau of Statistics (CBS), Hawa, Idlib had a population of 960 in the 2004 census.
