= Homs Military Academy =

Syrian military education institution

Coordinates: 34°45′25″N 36°40′55″E

- الكلية العسكرية بحمص
- Type: Military academy
- Established: 1933
- Location: Homs, Homs Governorate, Syria

Homs Military Academy (Arabic: الكلية العسكرية بحمص) is a military educational and training institution located in Homs, Syria.

== History ==
=== Establishment ===
Homs Military Academy was founded in 1933 by France during the Mandate for Syria and the Lebanon. During the period of French administration the academy provided officer training for the Troupes Speciales du Levant - the locally recruited Syrian and Lebanese units forming part of the Army of the Levant.

Continuing in existence after the end of the Mandate in 1943 and throughout various political changes, it remains the oldest and largest military service institution in Syria, even the school was thriving under Ba'athist rule that began in 1963. At first, it was primarily an academy for infantry officers, while graduates who selected the other services went on to additional specialized training at other army-operated specialist schools. Graduates were often selected for a military academy in the Soviet Union.

Homs Academy admitted entrants who did not possess high level education qualifications, as well as offering a relatively rare rapid career path for graduates. In addition to large numbers of Syrian and Lebanese nationals it also offered officer training to French citizens who were denied by class or education from attending comparable academies within France.

=== Syrian civil war ===
On 23 July 2011, there were reports of explosions at the Homs Academy during the Syrian revolution, which later denied by the Syrian military. On 15 April 2012, the Syrian Army targeted the neighborhood of al-Waer from the nearby Homs Academy during the military confrontation in the city. On 30 August 2013, the academy was evacuated and its military equipment moved, to avoid a possible air attack from the United States following the Ghouta chemical attack.

On 5 October 2023, a drone attack during a graduation ceremony at the academy killed over 100 people.

The military academy's operations remain uncertain following the fall of the Assad regime in late 2024 and the military was turned over to the former Hay'at Tahrir al-Sham rebels.

== Notable alumni ==
- Sarfraz Ali, Pakistani Lieutenant General, killed in aviation accident in 2022
- Lu'ay al-Atassi, Lieutenant-General, military attache to USA. Titular President during interim government.
- Ali Abdullah Ayyoub, Deputy Prime Minister of Syria, senior Syrian Arab Army officer and former Minister of Defense
- Adnan al-Malki, Deputy-Chief of Staff of Syrian Army
- Ali Aslan, Lieutenant General, Former Chief of Staff of Syrian Army
- Bashar al-Assad, Former Syrian President
- Hafez al-Assad, Former Syrian President
- Rifat al-Assad, brother of Former Syrian President
- Adnan Badr Hassan, Former intelligence chief
- Suhayl al-Hasan, Major General, former Commander of Elite 25th Special Mission Forces Division
- Ali Haydar "Father of the Syrian Special Forces, served as commander of the Syrian Special Forces for 26 years
- Salah Jadid, Major General, De Facto former leader of Syria
- Ghazi Kanaan, Syria's interior minister and head of Syria's security apparatus in Lebanon
- Hassan Khalil, Former Head of Military Intelligence of Syria
- Hikmat al-Shihabi, Former chief of staff of the Syrian Army
- Bahjat Suleiman Major General, Former Syrian Ambassador to Jordan and Head of Internal Branch of General Intelligence Directorate.
- Fawzi Selu, both a graduate and later director of the academy
- Manaf Tlass, former Brigadier General of the Syrian Republican Guard and member of Bashar al-Assad's inner circle
- Mustafa Tlass, former Syrian senior military officer and politician who was Syria's minister of defense from 1972 to 2004.
