= Al-Tamanah Subdistrict =

Al-Tamanah Subdistrict ناحية التمانعة
- Nahiyah
- Location in Idlib Governorate

- Location in Syria
- Coordinates: 35.4658°N 36.8742°E
- Country: Syria
- Governorate: Idlib
- District: Maarrat al-Nu'man District

Population (2004)
  - Total: 29,114
- Time zone: UTC+2 (EET)
  - Summer (DST): UTC+3 (EEST)
- Nahya pcod: SY070204

Al-Taman'ah Subdistrict (Arabic: ناحية التمانعة) is a Syrian nahiyah (subdistrict) located in Ma'arrat al-Nu'man District in Idlib. According to the Syria Central Bureau of Statistics (CBS), Al-Taman'ah Subdistrict had a population of 29,114 in the 2004 census.
