= Northwestern Syria offensive (2019–2020) =

Military operation of the Syrian civil war

Northwestern Syria offensive (December 2019 – March 2020)
- Part of the Syrian Civil War and the Turkish military operation in Idlib Governorate
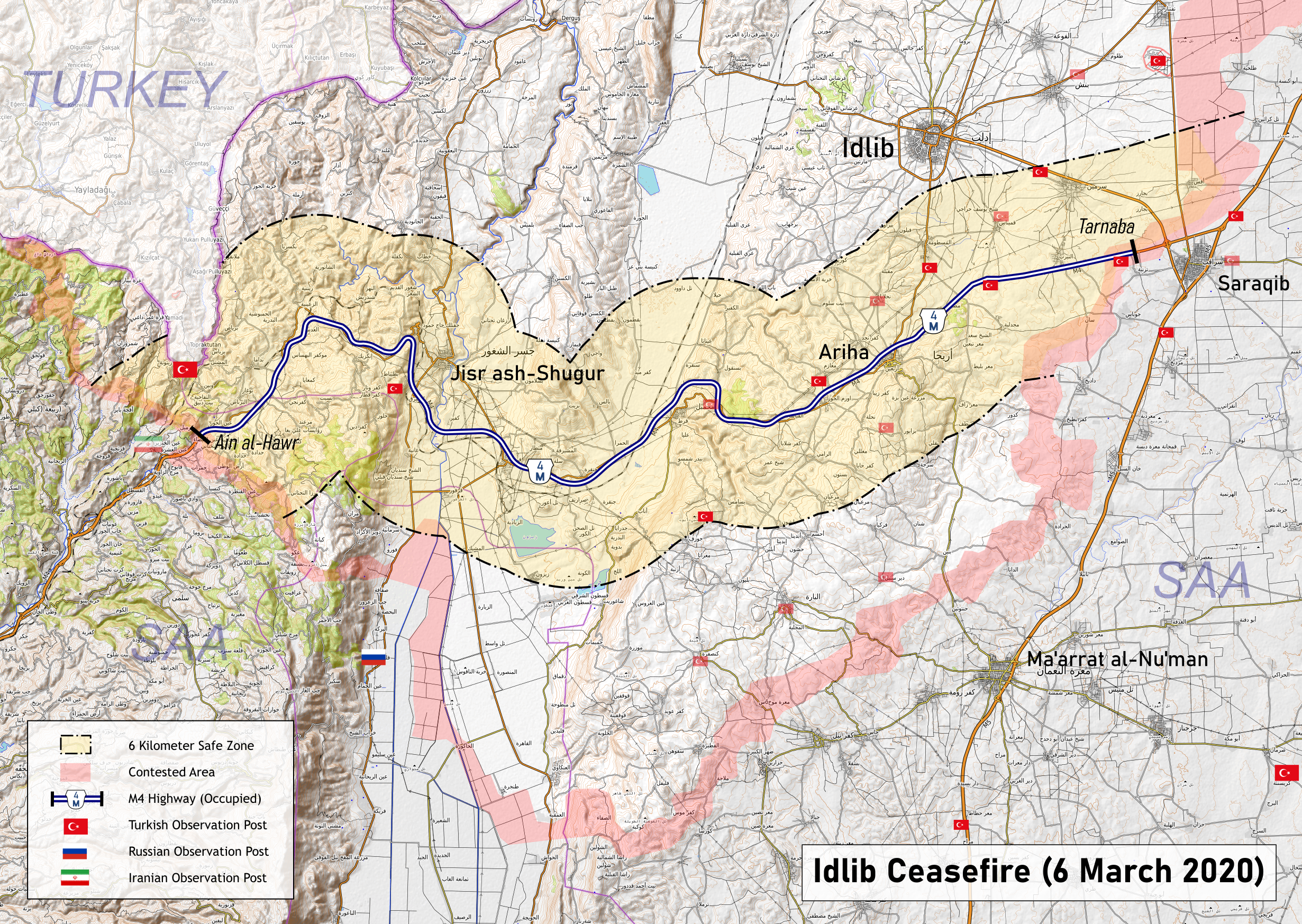
- Top: Situation in northwestern Syria as of 8 March 2020. Locations of Turkish, Russian, and Iranian outposts are marked. Bottom: Situation along the M4 Highway after the 6 March 2020 ceasefire. Syrian Army control Syrian Opposition control Syrian Army & SDF control
Date	19 December 2019 – 6 March 2020 (2 months, 2 weeks and 2 days)
Location	Northwestern Syria: Western Aleppo Governorate; Idlib Governorate; Northwestern Hama Governorate
Result	Syrian government victory
Territorial changes	Syrian Army and allies capture 2,345 square kilometers of territory and 295 towns, villages and hilltops, including the strategic cities of Ma'arrat al-Nu'man and Saraqib, and the towns of Jarjanaz, Kafr Rumah, Hish, Kafranbel, Khan Tuman, Al-Eiss and the Al-Ghab Plain; Syrian Army and allies gain complete control over the entire M5 highway; Syrian Army and allies encircle 9 out of 29 Turkish observation posts; Turkish-backed rebels recapture 19 towns and villages, including the northern part of the Al-Ghab Plain

Belligerents
(Ba'athist Syria) Syrian Government; Russia; Iran; Allied militias: PMF-affiliated militias Liwa Fatemiyoun; Liwa Zainebiyoun; Hezbollah	Syrian Opposition; Syrian Salvation Government; (Syrian opposition) Syrian Interim Government; Rouse the Believers Operations Room; Jaysh al-Izza; Turkistan Islamic Party; Imam Bukhari Jamaat; Ajnad al-Kavkaz; Junud al-Sham; Malhama Tactical; Turkey (from 3 February)

Commanders and leaders
Maher al-Assad (4th Division commander); Suheil al-Hassan (25th Special Forces commander); Burhan Rahmun † (commander of 124th Brigade of Republican Guard); Ismael Ali †; Mazar Farwati †; Basil Ali Khaddour † (commander of 6th regiment of 25th Special Forces); Juma al Ahmad † (Baqir Brigade commander); Asghar Pashapour † (IRGC senior commander; Iranian-backed militias overseer); Jaafar al Sadiq † (Hezbollah commander)	Abu Mohammad al-Julani (Hay'at Tahrir al-Sham leader); Abu Ubeidah al-Kansafra † (Hayat Tahrir al-Sham commander); Obada Abu Jafar † (Ansar al-Tawhid commander); Maj. Gen. Salim Idris (Syrian Interim Government Defense Minister; Syrian National Army Chief of Staff); Brig. Gen. Adnan al-Ahmad (Syrian National Army Deputy Chief of Staff); Thaer Maarouf (First Legion leader); Gen. Ahmad Rahhal (SAA defector); Captain Mustafa Kuja (Northern Command commander); Ali Jaber Pasha (Leader of Ahrar al-Sham); Col. Mustafa Bakour (Jaysh al-Izza commander) (Turkey) Hulusi Akar (Turkish Minister of Defense) (Turkey) Lt. Gen Sinan Yayla (2nd Army commander)

Units involved
Syrian Armed Forces; Syrian Arab Army; 4th Armoured Division; 25th Special Mission Forces Division; Republican Guard; 30th Division; 5th Corps; Syrian Air Force; Local Defence Forces; Baqir Brigade; Qamr Bani Hashim Division; 313 Force; Special Assignments Battalion; National Defence Forces; Palestinian Syrian militias; Liwa al-Quds; Free Palestine Movement; Military Intelligence Directorate; Forces of the Fighters of the Tribes (Note: As can be seen in a photo collection of this article by the Long War Journal, one of pro-government fighters killed during this offensive belonged to the Forces of the Fighters of the Tribes. The militia's emblem can be seen on his photo.); Russian Armed Forces; Air Force; Federal Security Service; Spetsgruppa "K" advisors; Military Police; (Iran) Iranian Armed Forces; IRGC; Quds Force; Iranian-affiliated militias; Hezbollah; Lebanese Hezbollah; Syrian Hezbollah	Hay'at Tahrir al-Sham; Aleppo City Battalion; Red Bands; Katibat al-Tawhid wal-Jihad; Popular Resistance Units; Syrian National Army; 1st Legion; Northern Brigade; 9th Special Forces Division of Aleppo; Ahrar al-Sharqiya; Samarkand Brigade; (Syrian opposition) Jaysh al-Sharqiya; 2nd Legion; Sultan Murad Division; Hamza Division; 3rd Legion; Glory Corps; Levant Front; National Front for Liberation; Sham Legion; Ahrar al-Sham; Jaysh al-Ahrar; Free Idlib Army; Northern Division; Rouse the Believers Operations Room; Guardians of Religion Organization; Ansar al-Tawhid; Jama'at Ansar al-Islam; Turkish Armed Forces; Turkish Land Forces; Turkish Air Force

Strength
Unknown	12,000–20,000; 22,000–50,000 (total, not all involved); 8,350–20,000; 3,500–5,000

Casualties and losses
1,449 soldiers killed 2 Mi-17s shot down 2 SU-24s shot down 1 L-39 shot down 55 killed (Hezbollah) 15 killed (Russia) 8 killed (Iran) 5–21 killed	1,496 fighters killed (Turkey) 59–73 killed (58–72 soldiers, 1 contractor) (Note: Turkish losses presented do not include early claims of 50–100 dead in the February 2020 Balyun airstrikes. Archived 29 February 2020 at the Wayback Machine Instead, they include 34 soldiers killed in the airstrike confirmed by Turkey. Archived 11 March 2020 at the Wayback Machine) (Turkey) 5–12 TAF combat drones shot down
- 370+ civilians killed (per UN; by February); 470+ civilians killed (per SOHR); 980,000+ civilians displaced from Idlib and Aleppo

The 2019–2020 northwestern Syria offensive, codenamed "Dawn of Idlib 2," was a military operation launched by the armed forces of the Syrian Arab Republic, Russia, Iran, Hezbollah and other allied militias against Syrian opposition and allied fighters of the Syrian National Army, Hay'at Tahrir al-Sham, Rouse the Believers Operations Room, the Turkistan Islamic Party, and other rebels during the Syrian civil war. The offensive began on 19 December 2019 and saw Russian-backed pro-Syrian government forces clash with Turkish-backed opposition groups along with leaving 980,000 civilians displaced.

By February 2020, pro-government forces had encircled several Turkish observation posts that had been established throughout Idlib governorate. On 27 February, after intermittent deadly clashes between Turkish and Syrian forces, Turkey formally intervened in the offensive and announced the beginning of Operation Spring Shield with the aim of pushing Syrian government forces back to pre-offensive frontlines.

On 5 March 2020, a meeting took place between Turkish president Recep Tayyip Erdoğan and Russian president Vladimir Putin in which they agreed on a ceasefire beginning on 6 March that established a six-kilometer secure corridor along the M4 Highway. The ceasefire also called for joint Turkish–Russian patrols along the highway beginning on 15 March.

== Background ==
Following Syrian government victories in 2018 during the siege of Eastern Ghouta, the Southern Damascus offensive, and the completion of rebel evacuations from eastern Qalamoun—which partially concluded the government's Rif Dimashq Governorate campaign—parts of northwestern Syria in the Idlib and Aleppo Governorates became the only significant opposition-controlled territory. Fighters of the Syrian National Army loyal to the Syrian Interim Government (concentrated in Aleppo) and some 20,000 fighters aligned with the internationally proscribed terrorist organization Hay'at Tahrir al-Sham (HTS) and loyal to the Syrian Salvation Government (concentrated in Idlib) held out against Bashar al-Assad's government and its allies, with a civilian population of three million living in the area.

According to a Reuters analysis, the January 2019 takeover of Idlib by Hay'at Tahrir al-Sham ended any realistic prospect of fulfilling the requirements of the 2018 Turko-Russian Agreement, which called for the disarming of the jihadist faction and reopening of the strategic M4 and M5 highways. The offensive that began in December 2019 was aimed at reopening the highways to civilian traffic, as well as the final elimination of rebel control over the territory.

== Prelude ==
On 20 November 2019, Qah was struck by a ground-to-ground missile from the Syrian government with Russian and Iranian support. It killed at least 16 people. The United States strongly condemned the attack.

On 24 November 2019, pro-Syrian government forces, supported by Russian airstrikes, entered the villages of Umm Elkhalayel, Zarzur, al-Sayeer and Msheirfeh, causing dozens of casualties on both sides. The next day, a second advance was attempted by government forces targeting the village of al-Farjah, which Syrian state media reported as being under the control of Hay'at Tahrir al-Sham (HTS).

On 26 November, opposition media reported that the rebel Al-Fatah al-Mubin Operations Room repelled another attempted government advance on the Sahel village in Idlib's southeastern countryside.

On 28 November, Hay'at Tahrir al-Sham announced repelling a joint Iranian militia-Syrian advance on Kabani in northeastern Latakia Governorate, with pro-government forces withdrawing after hours of clashes. Russian warplanes were also reportedly seen during the assault, according to opposition sources.

On 30 November, HTS and other rebel groups reportedly captured several villages near the Abu al-Duhur Military Airbase, according to pro-government sources.

On 1 December, according to government sources, HTS, the Turkish-backed National Front for Liberation (NFL), Ajnad al-Kavkaz, and Ansar al-Tawhid attacked government-controlled villages, with fierce clashes occurring in the towns of Establat and Rassem Wared in which two tanks and five transport vehicles were reportedly destroyed; during the rebel advance, the Syrian military said it destroyed two SVBIEDs (suicide car bombs) near the town of Kafriya. The joint rebel offensive was ultimately repelled.

On 4 December, clashes occurred as the Syrian Arab Army (SAA) seized a military base east of Umm al-Tinah village.

On 9 December, pro-government sources reported that the military bombarded rebel-held areas in the southern Idlib countryside, as well as portions of the western Aleppo countryside and parts of Aleppo city's outskirts.

== The offensive ==
Pro-government airstrikes in the region began to intensify on 15 December 2019. Meanwhile, on 17 December, Russian intelligence reported that 300 fighters from the Turkish-backed Syrian National Army (SNA) arrived in Idlib from Afrin in preparation for renewed fighting.

Following the air bombing campaign and after the 14th round of negotiations in Nur-Sultan, Kazakhstan ended a few days prior without any definitive ceasefire agreement, ground fighting resumed on 18 December, reportedly due to the opposition's refusal to accept new Russian terms regarding control of Idlib. As many as 200 Hay'at Tahrir al-Sham and Guardians of Religion Organization fighters jointly attacked Syrian government forces in the Umm al Khalakhil and Zarzur fronts. The Syrian military said they had repelled all attacks and that 12 pro-government fighters were injured and hospitalized.

=== Opening advances ===
On 19 December, pro-government media reported that the Syrian government had initiated the "second phase" of Operation Dawn of Idlib, the prior government offensive in summer 2019, with pro-government forces led by the 25th Special Mission Forces Division (formerly known as the Tiger Forces) attacking several villages in southeastern Idlib Governorate, particularly along the Umm Jalal axis. A Syrian military source said the objective of the operation was to capture territory south of Ma'arrat al-Nu'man, a key rebel stronghold on the M5 highway. There were Russian airstrikes on Tal Mardikh in the eastern Idlib countryside and the village of Marshamarin in southern Idlib, and government helicopter barrel bomb attacks on Jarjnaz and al-Ghadfah, as well as bombing of Ma'arrat al-Nu'man. 80 people were reported killed on both sides on 20–21 December, including in heavy air strikes on Ma'arrat al-Nu'man and Saraqib. Russia reported that 17 Syrian soldiers were killed.

On 21 December, according to pro-government sources, several pro-government fighters were killed in an ambush by the National Front for Liberation (NFL) in Latakia, with several light weapons also captured. Meanwhile, HTS claimed a suicide attack in the village of al-Furqa, southeast of Idlib, which reportedly killed 30 Syrian troops.

By 22 December, government forces spearheaded by the 5th Corps and the 25th Special Mission Forces Division had made notable advances in the southeastern Idlib countryside, battling rebel units in the area and reportedly capturing over 15 towns and villages within a 48-hour period. According to front line reports, the SAA death toll had risen to 40, with over 50 wounded. An SAA source said the rebels had suffered 70–80 dead. During its advance, the Syrian army began encircling the Turkish observation point near Sarman. Government sources reported the death of Colonel Basil Ali Khaddour, the commander of the sixth regiment of the 25th Special Mission Forces Division, while opposition media reported several of the Division's members killed.

On 23 December, the Syrian army advanced further, completely surrounding the Turkish observation point near Sarman and capturing Jarjnaz, considered the largest town in the eastern countryside of Ma'arrat al-Nu'man.

On 24 December, Hay'at Tahrir al-Sham and other opposition elements launched a morning counterattack to retake Jarjnaz, recapturing the villages of Tell Mannas, al-Barsah, Farwan, and al-Ghadfah in the process, according to SOHR; an SVBIED was deployed and attacked pro-government forces in Jarjnaz. By 24 December, 30,000 people had fled from the areas around Ma'arrat al-Nu'man while airstrikes on the M5 highway reportedly targeted civilians fleeing north from the front lines. Pro-government media reported that HTS withdrew from its defensive positions in and around Ma'arat Al-Nu'man as well as other defensive positions in the southern Idlib countryside, handing control over to Ansar al-Tawhid, part of the Rouse the Believers Operations Room. The Deputy Defense Minister of the Syrian Interim Government said that HTS had blocked reinforcements sent by the SNA from areas in northern Aleppo such as Afrin and further alleged that the only SNA factions allowed into Idlib by HTS were the Levant Front, Ahrar al-Sharqiya and the Lions of the East Army. HTS denied the claims.

On 25 December, the Russian Air Force reportedly bombed a military convoy of Ahrar al-Sham moving near the town of Kafr Nabl in southern Idlib, killing an unknown number of its field commanders and fighters.

On 26 December, ground advancements largely halted and both sides began shelling each other's positions around Ma'arrat Al-Nu'man, with casualties reported on both sides. Pro-government forces began shelling the rebel-held towns of Bernan, Farwan, Barissa, and Halban. Both government and opposition factions later reported that they paused their field operations in the Idlib region due to poor weather conditions. According to a Syrian army source, the air force was temporarily grounded because of limited visibility. The NFL reportedly planned to launch a counterattack, but it was also called off due to poor weather conditions. Instead, they brought reinforcements to their positions.

By the end of the month, hundreds of SNA fighters (two brigades) were transferred to Idlib as a result of an agreement with HTS, which had previously blocked the entry of SNA combatants.

The Syrian Army offensive was condemned by world leaders, including United States president Donald Trump, who tweeted that "Russia, Syria, and Iran are killing, or on their way to killing, thousands of innocent civilians in Idlib province." By this stage, United Nations agencies were reporting that "mass evacuations" of pro-opposition families from front line areas "have left behind a landscape of ghost towns".

=== Russia–Turkey ceasefire ===
According to a Russian major-general, a ceasefire was agreed with Turkey, which supported many of the rebel factions in the area, between late December 2019 and early January 2020; the ceasefire was introduced in the Idlib de-escalation zone on 9 January 2020. Turkey had sent a delegation to Moscow to establish a new ceasefire in the region. Turkey's defense ministry announced that the ceasefire would take effect on 12 January and said that Syrian and Russian land and air attacks would halt at one minute past midnight. The ceasefire was set to stem the flow of refugees from Idlib and allow the delivery of humanitarian aid to the region.

On 11 January 2020, a day before the brokered ceasefire went into effect, Ansar al-Tawhid released a video of a mechanized attack against government positions in southeastern Idlib using heavy machine guns previously captured from the Syrian army. The group also reportedly ambushed a vehicle carrying government officers and successfully captured a position from government forces, seizing some small arms in the process.

=== Post–ceasefire advances ===
Late on 15 January, post-ceasefire, the Syrian Arab Army and its allies resumed offensive actions in southern Idlib in response to a prior series of apparent ceasefire violations by Hay'at Tahrir al-Sham and other militant groups. The Syrian Army captured the villages of Barsah and Nouhiya, located west of the Abu al-Duhur Military Airbase.

On 16 January, the Syrian army captured three towns in southeast Idlib after troops stormed the towns of Talkhatra, Abu Jurayf and Khirbat Dawud in the morning. The three towns were secured following several hours of clashes that killed 22 militants, including 16 jihadists, according to SOHR. HTS and its allies claimed to recapture Abu Jurayf in a counterattack that killed more than ten Syrian troops, due to the SAA failing to secure the town after initially storming it. On 17 January, the rebels captured Tal Musaytif from government forces, according to SOHR.

Russia's defense ministry stated that a major clash had occurred on the evening of 22 January between Turkistan Islamic Party (TIP) forces—backed by 20 cars, tanks and two armored vehicles—and Syrian government forces. The ministry and Syrian state media added that the militants also used attack drones and car bombs and that the assault pushed the SAA out of two settlements in Idlib. The clashes reportedly left up to 50 fighters killed and 90 wounded while government forces lost 40 dead and 80 wounded. An NFL spokesman said the assault had taken place earlier in the week. A Syrian military source was cited as saying army units were redeployed to the area and eventually repelled the attacks "with high efficiency". However, a "field source" in Hama quoted by pro-government media said he was not aware of any significant attack near the front lines and that rebels were mostly using artillery and rockets to strike the SAA's positions in the de-escalation zone. On the same day the Rouse the Believers Operations Room rebel coalition released photos of captured equipment and also released a photo of a pro-government fighter's German identification card. The coalition also released video footage of mortar attacks against Syrian troops.

=== Capture of Ma'arrat al-Nu'man ===
After a short lull, and after the Russia-Turkey ceasefire failed to materialize, the Syrian Arab Army renewed its ground offensive towards Ma'arrat al-Nu'man on 24 January, assisted by massive airstrikes. Ma'arrat al-Nu'man was of both strategic and symbolic importance due to its location on the strategic Aleppo-Damascus highway/motorway (M5)—one of Syria's economic arteries—and that it was a major center for anti-government protests against Assad's rule since the civil war began in 2011.

Led by the 4th Armored Division, the Syrian army also launched new ground operations on the Aleppo axis on 25 January, opening with a massive artillery barrage on rebel defenses in the western Aleppo outskirts, spanning from the Al-Zahra'a Association Quarter to Rashiddeen 3 and 4 suburbs. The 4th Division conducted an armored assault on rebel defense lines near the Great Prophet Mosque, the local scientific research building, and Rashidden 3 suburb, but did not make any significant gains.

Between 24 and 26 January, the Syrian army captured eight towns and villages in the Ma'arrat al-Nu'man countryside, including Tell Mannas, Al-Ghadfa, and Maar Shamshah, and captured a section of the M5 highway north of the stronghold, cutting a major rebel communication and supply line from Idlib. According to SOHR, by 26 January, Russia had conducted 78 airstrikes targeting front lines around Ma'arrat al-Nu'man, south of Aleppo, and in the western countryside while Syrian helicopters reportedly deployed 52 barrel bombs in rural areas. According to opposition activists and paramedics, Ma'arrat al-Nu'man was almost empty of its 110,000 civilian residents as a result of the intense government bombardment in prior weeks which displaced hundreds of thousands, many of which fled north towards the border with Turkey. By the end of 26 January, the SAA was less than a kilometer from the city.

On 27 January, heavy clashes continued as government forces reached the eastern, northern and southern outskirts of Ma'arrat al-Nu'man, nearly encircling it. The 25th Special Mission Forces Division reportedly overran rebel defenses on the city's southern flank, capturing several towns and villages, including Sahyan, Kafr Basin, and Muqah, and capturing the majority of the M5 highway located south of the metro, except for the Turkish observation post at Maar Hattat. According to SOHR, pro-government forces were besieging Ma'arrat al-Nu'man from three sides and had captured 22 areas since 24 January; SOHR recorded 91 deaths among pro-government forces and 112 among the rebels, including 89 jihadists, since 24 January. On the Aleppo front, there were reports in pro-government media of an ongoing battle near Khan Tuman between Hay'at Tahrir al-Sham and the Syrian army, assisted by the National Defence Forces (NDF). The army attempted to capture the village after they seized several hills to its northeast.

The Syrian Armed Forces' official statement on the capture of Ma'arrat al-Nu'man

On 28 January, the Syrian Arab Army and allies captured Kafr Rumah and the Wadi Deif military base following token rebel resistance. Pro-government forces subsequently stormed Ma'arrat al-Nu'man from three fronts, entering the city and capturing most of its districts after short clashes, according to Syrian state media. A Syrian military source said HTS and allied rebels mostly withdrew from the stronghold the day before, neglecting to defend the city proper, besides a small garrison. It was the first time Syrian government forces had control of the city since losing it on 10 October 2012. Rebel units subsequently counterattacked pro-government forces in the vicinity of the stronghold. SOHR said that at least 147 pro-government fighters and 151 opposition fighters were killed in the battle.

The SAA continued to push west of Ma'arrat al-Nu'man, reportedly capturing Hantutin. Meanwhile, the SAA reported it had reached the outskirts of Khan Tuman after capturing the last hills to its east during repeated assaults spearheaded by the Republican Guard's 30th Division.

On 29 January, following the latest army advances, the SOHR reported that 57% of the Idlib Governorate remained under rebel control, while the other 43% was controlled by government forces. It stated that the Syrian Army had managed to capture over 40 kilometers of the M5 highway and only a 25-kilometer stretch held by rebel forces was preventing it from controlling the highway in its entirety. It also reported a government advance on the outskirts of Aleppo, but stated that it did not hold strategic significance. Al-Masdar News reported that the Syrian Army had secured Ma'arrat al-Nu'man's flanks and further captured the town of al-Harradah. An armed rebel group reportedly stormed Idlib Central Hospital, occupying it for military purposes for a few hours while Al-Shami Hospital in Ariha was reportedly struck by multiple airstrikes.

Government forces also advanced towards Aleppo's western suburbs to push rebels away from the city. The army reported a breakthrough in the Rashideen 5 suburb of Aleppo and advanced toward Rashideen 4, stating this advance was the first major SAA breakthrough on the previously deadlocked Aleppo front.

A number of Hezbollah fighters were reported killed in this stage of the offensive. On 24 January, Jaafar al Sadiq, a Hezbollah commander, was reported killed; on 27 January, three more fighters' deaths in the Aleppo countryside were announced; a fifth Hezbollah death, in al-Zahraa, was subsequently announced.

=== Army advance towards Saraqib and proposed Turkish deadline ===
On 30 January, the Syrian Army reached the outskirts of the opposition stronghold of Saraqib, north of Ma'arrat al-Nu'man, after capturing the towns of Kafr Battikh, Tell Mardikh, Jobas, Qomhane, Hatamiyeh and Tell Dibs, pushing the front line to just three kilometers away from Saraqib's city center. Later in the day, the army advanced further in the southeastern Idlib countryside, capturing the al-Suater hilltop from Hay'at Tahrir al-Sham and its allies. Turkey's president Recep Tayyip Erdoğan threatened to take direct military action in Idlib unless the government-led offensive ceased. On the Aleppo front, HTS detonated a remote control car bomb and deployed SVBIEDs followed by rocket and mortar attacks into the northwestern Aleppo outskirts against Syrian government positions, opening a new front. The HTS-linked Ebaa News Agency released footage of HTS inghimasi fighters pledging to wage jihad until death before deploying for Aleppo to attack pro-government positions. Syrian state media claimed government forces destroyed four SVBIEDs before they reached their destination. HTS also claimed to have killed a number of Iranian-linked militia fighters in west Aleppo. Meanwhile, according to pro-government sources, the remnant Nour al-Din al-Zenki rebel group, operating from Turkish-backed opposition-held areas in northern Aleppo, sent reinforcements to the western Aleppo countryside to help bolster area defenses.

29–31 January saw sustained bombardments as the government and its allies carried out 200 strikes throughout Idlib; Russian airstrikes on Ariha reportedly struck a bakery and a medical facility. Civilians displaced from Saraqib and other towns were also reportedly targeted as they fled the war zone.

On 1 February, in response to government gains on the ground, the Turkish military established three new observation posts around Saraqib. On the same day, pro-government warplanes reportedly targeted al-Huda Hospital in the town of Hoor in the western countryside of Aleppo, destroying large parts of the building. There was an HTS counter-offensive in Al-Zahraa in Aleppo governorate, in which several Local Defense Force (LDF) pro-government militia fighters were reported killed. Four Russian FSB officers were reported killed the same day, also in the Aleppo countryside.

On 2 February, fighting was reported between HTS and the LDF-affiliated and Iranian-backed Baqir Brigade in the Aleppo countryside, in which a Brigade commander, Juma al Ahmad, was reported killed. An Islamic Revolutionary Guard Corps (IRGC) Quds Force commander, Asghar Pashapour, was killed the same day in the Aleppo countryside.

On 3 February, Syrian and Turkish forces exchanged fire in Idlib, Latakia and the northern Aleppo countryside. Turkey and the SOHR reported seven Turkish soldiers, one civilian contractor, and 13 Syrian soldiers were killed. Turkey said it had carried out retaliation strikes south of Saraqib, and witnesses reported artillery shelling and one F16 entering Syrian airspace. According to SOHR, at least 13 Syrian soldiers were killed (with other monitors giving similar numbers), while according to the Turkish president 30–35 were killed and according to Turkish Defense Minister Hulusi Akar 76 Syrian soldiers were "neutralized" and 57 Syrian military sites were bombed. Russia denied that any airstrikes had occurred at all and the Russian Reconciliation Center for Syria and Syrian Arab News Agency (SANA) denied Turkish claims of casualties among Syrian troops. Turkey's president Erdogan described the attack on Turkish forces a "turning point in Syria for Turkey". He gave the Syrian government a deadline of the end of February to withdraw from the de-escalation zone and demanded that Russian forces in Idlib "stand aside"; he nevertheless dismissed the possibility of direct conflict with Russia saying Turkey and Russia would talk about the issue "without anger".

Despite the Turkish operations, Syrian government forces continued its offensive in the southeastern part of Idlib Governorate and captured the villages of Ballisa, Tell Elaghar, an abandoned Air Defense base, Jadida Tal Khatra, Msheirfeh, Mardikh and Tell Mardikh on the same day. With this advance, the Syrian Army had captured 22 villages and towns including 110 square kilometers of territory. On the same day, according to medics and the SOHR, government airstrikes targeted civilian IDPs on the road near the village of Kafr Naya in the Aleppo countryside. The next day, Russian warplanes reportedly struck the Sarmin Health Center, leading to the almost complete destruction of the building.

=== Siege and capture of Saraqib ===
On 5 February, government forces captured around 20 settlements, including Resafah and several nearby villages, advancing east and north of Saraqib, isolating it from three directions.

On 6 February, a pro-government blog reported that pro-government forces seized the area of Duwayr, cutting off the M5 highway north of Saraqib and leaving only the road through Sarmin open, which itself was under constant fire from the army. Later in the day, the 25th Special Mission Forces Division captured the town of Afs, fully encircling Saraqib and all rebel and Turkish forces stationed there, including the four recently established Turkish observation posts, and entered the city. By 7 February, after two days of siege, government forces captured most of the city, opening the road towards the city of Idlib. Enab Baladi reported that seven Turkish soldiers were killed, meanwhile Turkey repeated its end-of-February deadline for the Syrian government to withdraw from the de-escalation zone.

Meanwhile, prominent rebel commander Obada Abu Jafar and eight other militants of an elite Ansar al-Tawhid unit were killed in fierce clashes with the Syrian Army while defending their positions in southern Idlib, according to a pro-government blog. On the same day, Israeli warplanes fired missiles near Damascus while targeting Iranian elements in the area. The Syrian government said Israel intended to "save the armed terrorist organisations which ha[d] been collapsing in Idlib and western Aleppo Governorate in front of the strikes of the Syrian Army".

=== Army captures the M5 highway and continued Turkish clashes ===
On 7 February, the Syrian army, spearheaded by the 25th Special Forces Division and assisted by the Republican Guard and Hezbollah, made further advances, reportedly capturing the towns of Zaytan, Birnah, Makhalah and Huwayyir al-Eis in the southwestern Aleppo countryside and the towns of Maharim, Khawari, Tall al-Nabariz, Ijaz, Rasm al-Ward and Abbad in southeast Idlib. The 25th Special Forces Division also captured the towns of Karrathin, al-Dahiriyah and al-Thuriyah as well as the Ebla University complex on the administrative border between southeast Idlib and southwest Aleppo by the end of the day.

On 8 February, the army reportedly captured several sites along the strategic M5 highway as it advanced north of Saraqib. Government forces also reportedly crossed the M5 highway and entered the southwestern countryside of the Aleppo Governorate, the first time since 2013, from the southern approach. On the northern approach, the army advanced on the town of Al-Eiss, capturing the towns of Maryudah, Tell Bajir, Kusiniya, al-Shiekh Ahmad, Abu Kannseh, Umm Atabah, Rasm al-Eis, Rasm al-Saharij and Jub Kas in the process. According to pro-government activists, Al-Eiss also hosted a Turkish observation post. The army subsequently captured Al-Eiss and the nearby hilltop. Pro-government forces later captured the town of Tell Hadiyah in the area while, on the Idlib front, continued their northern advance along the M5, capturing the town of Talhiyah. Meanwhile, Russian-Turkish talks in Ankara concluded after three hours with no progress made.

On 9 February, in Idlib, pro-government sources said the army captured the towns of Buwaybiyah and al-Kusaybiyah as well as the International Center for Agricultural Research in the Dry Areas (ICARDA) research center. Army units stormed and captured the towns of Barqum, al-Zarbah and al-Salehiyah along the M5. On the Aleppo front, pro-government forces captured the areas of Tal Kalariyah and Kalariyah and advanced on rebel positions in the Rashideen 4 district in west Aleppo.

On 10 February, Syrian government forces shelled a recently built Turkish observation post at Taftanaz Military Airbase, killing five Turkish soldiers, according to the Turkish Defense Ministry. According to the SOHR and other sources, six Turkish soldiers and four Syrian rebels were killed in the attack. The attack destroyed military hardware and supplies including trucks, APCs and a main battle tank. The Turkish Ministry of Defense said, but did not provide evidence, that 115 Syrian army sites and positions were targeted in retaliation, including destroying three tanks and two mortar positions, and that 101 Syrian soldiers were "neutralized". Meanwhile, the Syrian Army advanced west from the M5 highway towards the Turkish border, led by the 25th Special Mission Forces Division, and captured the towns of Kafr Halab, Meznaz, and another town from HTS and the NFL northeast of the ICARDA center, according to pro-government media, in an attempt to split the northern and southern parts of Idlib into separate pockets. On the night of 10–11 February, there were pro-government airstrikes on several towns in Idlib and Aleppo, killing at least 13 civilians while a maternity hospital in Atarib was narrowly missed by government bombs and a health facility in Maret al-Nasan was destroyed in shelling, according to NGOs. An IDP camp in Kafr Aruq was also struck, killing a child, according to the United Nations.

On 11 February, after asserting control over the Rashideen 4 district in western Aleppo and virtually converging the northern and southern front lines in the countryside, it was widely reported that government forces controlled the entirety of the M5 highway for the first time since 2012; however, this was not claimed by government media and opposition sources said fighting continued in some northern areas. A report on a Russian TV channel showed 25th Special Mission Forces Division troops, apparently wearing UNICEF backpacks distributed as relief supplies, entering Kafr Halab; The Daily Telegraph reported the troops were deliberately shooting elderly civilians there. On the same day, rebel groups launched a counteroffensive on the town of Nayrab, located west of Saraqib and south of Sarmin. Turkey claimed that 51 government fighters were killed in the rebel counteroffensive, and Turkish-backed rebel forces shot down a Syrian Mil Mi-17 helicopter, killing all on board. Rebels were also reported to retake the town of Sheikh Dames, 20 miles south of Idlib city. Later that day, the SAA captured Khan al-Asal, a key location on the M5 highway. That night, the NGO Action on Armed Violence reported that airstrikes on Idlib city left 12 civilians (half of them children) dead and 32 injured; government airstrikes on Darat Izza narrowly missed a hospital according to another NGO. By this point, according to Reuters, the government had taken 600 square kilometers (230 square miles) of territory in the offensive, and 700,000 people, mostly women and children, had been displaced—the largest number in a single period since fighting began in 2012 according to the UN—while 200 had been killed.

On 12 February, Turkey's president Erdogan announced: "I hereby declare that we will strike regime forces everywhere from now on regardless of the [2018] deal if any tiny bit of harm is dealt to our soldiers at observation posts or elsewhere." By this stage, Turkey had stationed 30,000 troops at the Syrian border, and sent 5,000 reinforcements to Idlib, bringing the total to 9,000, as well as establishing new defensive positions around Idlib city.

On 13 February, heavy bombardment and ground clashes forced the World Food Programme to pause their on-going relief efforts in Idlib, with Atareb especially severely affected. The town of Takad was shelled by government forces for the first of many times, causing residents to flee, according to MSF. The SAA, alongside the auxiliary Local Defense Forces and Liwa al-Quds, advanced north of Az Zarbah and captured Rif Muhandiseen and Kafr Jum along with several surrounding tactical points on the approach to the strategic Regiment 46 base, also known as Base 46, which fell to rebel forces in November 2012. Another army unit reportedly made a push on a separate axis in Aleppo.

On 14 February, a second Syrian Mil Mi-17 helicopter was shot down with a guided missile near Qubtan al-Jabal, killing its crew. According to an activist, the helicopter was shot down after dropping two barrel bombs. Between 14 and 15 February, pro-government shelling struck IDP camps located around the town of Sarmada, according to the UN and MSF. During 13–16 February, the UN reported that 160,000 people fled from advancing front lines, mostly from Atareb and Darat Izza sub-districts. The UN said a total of 100 civilians had been killed in the first two weeks of February by both air and ground-based strikes.

=== Western Aleppo assault and rebel retreat ===
Following the complete capture of the strategic M5 highway, the Syrian Army shifted its momentum towards securing Greater Aleppo, particularly the city's western outskirts. Among opposition settlements targeted by airstrikes in this period were Turmanin, al-Dana, Kabtan al Jabal, al-Abzimo and Darat Izza.

On 15 February, the army attacked opposition forces in the northern Aleppo countryside in Sheikh Aqil near Darat Izza from Bashmara, territory under joint Rojava and SAA control.

On 16 February, pro-government forces achieved a major breakthrough on the Aleppo front by capturing more than 30 villages, towns and suburbs in the west Aleppo countryside in a single day amidst a sudden collapse in rebel defense lines. By the evening, government forces, backed by continued Russian airstrikes, had managed to capture the last remaining rebel-held areas in Aleppo's western periphery, including towns and cities such as Haritan and Anadan, effectively concluding the period of intermittent clashes in the area that began with the Battle of Aleppo over seven years prior. Pro-government media reported that after having many of their supply lines cut off, rebel forces fled west to avoid being encircled by the SAA, thus leaving the army in control of the Greater Aleppo area. Meanwhile, Turkish media reported that a 100-vehicle convoy of reinforcements, including troops, tanks and other military vehicles and equipment, had been deployed to the Idlib area. HTS claimed a suicide attack on Russian positions in Kafr Halab.

On 17 February, President Bashar al-Assad addressed the nation in a rare televised speech, saying the military operations in Aleppo and Idlib governorates would continue regardless of Turkey's threats, and that the war was not yet over "but it means that we rubbed their noses in the dirt as a prelude for complete victory". Syrian state media also shared images of Aleppo residents apparently celebrating the recent advances, which reportedly pushed rebel mortar teams out of adequate firing range of the city for the first time in years and, along with the capture of the M5, was set to facilitate future civilian movement between northern and southern Syria up to pre-war levels. Meanwhile, according to NGOs, government forces bombed hospitals in Darat Izza.

Frontline advances, 24 January–19 February 2020

On 19 February, Turkish president Recep Tayyip Erdoğan announced that a Turkish intervention in Idlib was just "a matter of time". Meanwhile, pro-opposition NGO Syrian Network for Human Rights (SNHR) reported a Syrian government airstrike on an IDP camp near Deir Hassan.

=== Rebel counteroffensive towards Saraqib begins ===
On 20 February, Turkish-backed rebels launched another counteroffensive on Nayrab with Turkish artillery support. Turkish commandos were also reported to have been operating alongside rebels in the assault on the town. Russian planes provided air support to the pro-government forces and struck positions of the advancing rebels. Shelling on nearby towns on both the government-controlled and opposition-controlled sides of the frontline were reported, with both Russian and Turkish forces involved in air and artillery support roles respectively. During the battle, rebel fighters attempted to shoot down a Russian Su-24 using MANPADS while also claiming to have downed two Russian UAVs with MANPADS. After heavy fighting, the rebels managed to briefly seize Nayrab. However, Russian air support allowed pro-government forces to eventually repel rebel ground elements and recapture the town.

Russian news agency RIA Novosti said that the Russian Ministry of Defence contacted Turkish forces and asked them to end artillery support to the rebels and that Turkish troops agreed to do so. The Turkish Ministry of Defense confirmed that two Turkish soldiers had been killed and five wounded due to an airstrike during the assault, while also claiming the Turkish-backed rebels killed 50 Syrian government forces during the overall battle for the town. The Russian Defence Ministry said Russian elements destroyed one tank, six armored vehicles, and five other vehicles all belonging to the rebels. As well as the two confirmed Turkish deaths, the SOHR said that about 28 rebels and 14 pro-government soldiers were killed and that some captured Syrian soldiers were beheaded by jihadist fighters.

Before the clashes, Turkey reportedly asked the United States to deploy two Patriot surface-to-air missile systems on the Syria–Turkey border to deter Russian forces. However, the Russian state news agency reported that the Turkish Ministry of Defence had denied this. Reuters also reported on-going talks between Turkey and Russia about Syrian airspace. The same evening, Syrian government airstrikes were reported by SNHR on Hazarin—striking two schools—and nearby Ma'aret Harma, where a mosque was struck.

On 22 February, Turkey reported that a Turkish soldier was killed (the sixteenth such casualty in the month) in a bomb attack by pro-Syrian government forces, and said it retaliated by destroying 21 government targets. Turkey said it would meet with Russian and European leaders in March to discuss the situation.

=== Al-Ghab plain-Zawiya mountains assault, rebels recapture Saraqib ===
The Syrian Army and allies continued their main ground advance on 23 February in the Zawiya mountains (Jabal al-Zawiya) and al-Ghab plain region near the southern Idlib-northwestern Hama administrative border. During operations, Syrian artillery reportedly targeted a Turkish Army column near Bara in which several Turkish soldiers and rebel fighters were injured and forced to withdraw.

On 24 February, the Syrian Army reported advances in southern Idlib, capturing the towns of al-Naqayar, Araynabiyah, and Sitouh Al-Dayr, south of Kafrsajna, along with nearby Ma'ar Taseen, Jabla and Maar Tamater, as rebels retreated westwards. There were reports of ten Turkish soldiers killed and wounded by Russian and Syrian jet strikes on the Turkish post in Kansafra. According to the SOHR, several Turkish vehicles were destroyed and damaged as well. Turkish forces responded with rocket shelling on government positions. Meanwhile, Turkish-backed rebels continued their push towards Saraqib. SOHR and al-Masdar reported that National Front for Liberation and Hay'at Tahrir al-Sham forces, backed by the Turkish military, recaptured Nayrab from the SAA after eight hours and three waves of attacks while Turkish sources attributed the recapture to NFL, saying that the Iranian-backed militias and government forces defending the town took "many" casualties. SOHR said that 11 government and loyalist militia fighters and 26 rebels were killed, while al-Masdar claimed 150 rebels were killed.

On 25 February, pro-government forces captured Kafr Nabl, a symbolically important stronghold for the Syrian opposition, while SOHR reported that the Syrian army also took control of Sheikh Dames and Sheikh Mustafa. In turn, rebel fighters reportedly recaptured the villages of San and Ma'arat Alia west of Saraqib. Syrian and Turkish clashes continued as Syrian warplanes targeted Turkish forces in Taftanaz Military Airbase northeast of Idlib city, with no reports of casualties. A Turkish Anka-S drone was also shot down in Dadekh, east of Idlib; SANA reported the aircraft infiltrated Syrian airspace and was intercepted. SNHR reported 25 civilians killed by government forces and its allies, and 185 civilians were reportedly injured as airstrikes targeted eight schools and two nurseries in rebel-held areas throughout Idlib Governorate while two MSF hospitals in Idlib city and Maarrat Misrin sustained damage.

On 26 February, Syrian government forces were reported to have captured 33 towns and villages in Idlib and Hama in the previous 60 hours, while a SOHR report said that a Turkish military column on the Bara–Kansafra road was targeted by government rockets, leaving a vehicle destroyed. Two Turkish soldiers were killed, according to the Turkish foreign ministry. SNHR reported that government artillery struck a hospital in Idlib city, and that a total of 126 civilians had been killed by Russian and government forces in the 44 days since the end of the ceasefire on 12 January.

While government forces made territorial gains in southern Idlib and northern Hama, opposition factions with support from Turkish elements had counterattacked on a separate front towards Saraqib and, on the dawn of 27 February, fully recaptured the strategic city and cut the Damascus-Aleppo M5 highway once again. The counterattack also lifted the encirclement of the four Turkish observation posts established around the city's perimeter. Frontlines continued to shift as the Syrian army's southern Idlib assault continued; pro-government forces captured 20 additional villages in the al-Ghab plain and Zawiya mountain region, establishing control over southern al-Ghab and regaining control of the entirety of Hama Governorate.

=== Operation Spring Shield ===
On 27 February, in a major escalation, at around 5:00 p.m. local, pro-government airstrikes targeted a Turkish mechanized infantry battalion, composed of about 400 soldiers, near a post in Balyun in the Zawiya mountains, leaving 33 soldiers killed and others wounded, some seriously. Several military vehicles were also reported destroyed. While sources in Idlib and unverified footage of the strike suggested it had been conducted by the Russian air force, Russia denied responsibility and Turkey's leadership nevertheless held Syrian government forces responsible. Meanwhile, Reuters cited witnesses as saying the government resumed airstrikes on residential areas of Idlib city the same evening.

On 28 February, Turkey said it retaliated for the Balyun strikes by striking 200 Syrian government targets and "neutralizing" 309 soldiers in a dedicated operation throughout Greater Idlib. Turkish drone and artillery strikes on Syrian army positions in the east and south of the governorate were reported to have targeted helicopters, tanks, armoured vehicles, howitzers, ammunition trucks and ammunition depots. In contrast to Turkish numbers, the SOHR reported that 34 Syrian soldiers and 14 Hezbollah fighters (10 Lebanese nationals and four of other nationalities, including at least one Iranian) and an officer of the IRGC were killed by the Turkish counterattack. Hezbollah later confirmed eight of the deaths, including an Iranian cleric identified as Sayyed Ali Zengani, while pro-government media also reported Hezbollah deaths. Iranian media also reported the deaths of 21 members of Afghan Liwa Fatemiyoun and Pakistani Liwa Zainabiyoun brigades—Shia forces supported by Iran—in the Turkish operation. Turkish forces also bombed defense and scientific research laboratories in the as-Safira area of the eastern Aleppo countryside with SAMs and claimed to have targeted the Kuweires and Abu al-Duhur military airbases in Aleppo Governorate. Russian media reported Turkish ground troops using MANPADS while attempting to shoot down Russian and Syrian warplanes. Overnight retaliatory Syrian government attacks killed a Turkish soldier and injured six more.

Amid the sudden escalation, the United States expressed support for Turkey and NATO Secretary General Jens Stoltenberg told media following the North Atlantic Council meeting—requested by Turkey to hold consultations under Article 4 of NATO's founding Washington Treaty—that NATO continued to support Turkey with a range of measures, "including by augmenting its air defences". Stoltenberg also urged Russia and the Syrian government "to stop the indiscriminate air attacks" and to engage with UN-led peace efforts, while the UN expressed concern at the developments. Turkey further escalated regional tensions when it threatened to open its borders with Europe to allow Syrian refugees to leave, prompting Greece and Bulgaria to tighten border security. The UN Secretary-General called for an immediate ceasefire and was backed by 13 UN Security Council members, but Russia and China vetoed the measure. Russia increased naval and airborne deliveries to Syria, concerned that Turkey may shut the Bosporus to Russian shipping and Turkish airspace to Russian supply flights.

On 29 February, Turkish-backed rebels recaptured several villages in al-Ghab plain, reversing recent government gains. Meanwhile, according to SOHR, the number of Syrian army soldiers killed by the Turkish retaliation in the past 48 hours rose to 74. In addition, at least eight more Hezbollah fighters were killed on 29 February.

By the end of February, Reuters put the total figure of Turkish soldiers killed at 55.

==== No-fly zone in Idlib and battle for Saraqib ====
On 1 March, Turkey's defence minister Hulusi Akar announced the continuation of Operation Spring Shield, which was launched on 27 February. Turkish F-16Cs shot down two Syrian Su-24M2 jets in the western Idlib countryside; Syrian state-run media said that both pilots parachuted and survived. On the same day, according to Turkey's state-owned Anadolu Agency, Turkish forces targeted the Nayrab military airport and allegedly rendered it unusable. With increased Turkish operations, front line ground momentum in the southern Idlib countryside shifted in favor of the Syrian opposition. Pro-government media reported that rebel forces supported by Turkish elements retook the town of al-Amiqiyah with the aim of reversing government gains. Pro-opposition sources said Turkish-backed rebels captured a further seven towns on the Zawiya mountain front while Turkish media reported that nine villages were recaptured by the Syrian National Army in the first 24 hours of the new phase of the operation, naming Anqawi, al-Qahira, Al-Manara and Tal Zajran villages in the Hama countryside and Al-Halluba, Qoqfin, Kafr Avid, Sfuhan and Fattara in southern Idlib, destroying at least three SAA tanks and killing at least 46 government soldiers.

Reportedly dozens of Turkish ANKA-S and Bayraktar-TB2 drones attacked government targets, and destroyed several Russian-made air defence systems; and according to Turkey, targets included chemical weapons depots, although SOHR rejected that claim. In response, Syria said it had shot down three Turkish drones. Images on social media showed a Turkish TAI Anka drone shot down by Syrian Air Defenses, and Turkey confirmed one drone was hit. On the same day, Syria said it was closing its northwestern airspace and warned it would target any hostile aircraft. The Chief of the Russian Reconciliation Center for Syria said that the Russian task force in Syria could not guarantee the safety of Turkish aircraft's flights over Syria. Despite this, Turkey claimed to have attacked Nayrab airport, west of Aleppo city, and bombed Kuweires airport, east of Nayrab, "marking a significant expansion of Ankara's targets", according to Reuters. SOHR reported 19 pro-government fighters were killed in strikes on a military convoy in the Zawiya mountain area and a base near Ma'arrat al-Nu'man. Turkey claimed that 2,212 pro-government combatants had been "neutralized", i.e. killed, wounded or captured, since the resumption of Operation Spring Shield, while SOHR said that 74 Syrian army troops and pro-government fighters had been killed since 27 February; other monitors put the figure at around 150.

Meanwhile, in Beirut, thousands of mourners attended the burial of five of the Hezbollah fighters killed in Idlib on 28 February while pro-government sources reported that Hezbollah was reinforcing Syrian troops on the Saraqib front and was reportedly approaching Nayrab.

On 2 March, opposition factions continued their counterattack in the strategically important al-Ghab-Zawiya mountain front while government forces simultaneously counterattacked on the Saraqib front further north; SOHR and the Syrian government reported that, backed by continued Russian air strikes, the SAA had recaptured parts of Saraqib. In the late afternoon, Russia's Reconciliation Centre in Syria announced that Russian Military Police had been deployed to Saraqib while the SNA claimed that Russian regular forces and mercenaries were part of the operation in the eastern part of the town. Russia claimed the military police's task was to establish effectively a humanitarian corridor for civilians by securing safe passage of vehicles and civilians traveling along the M4 and M5 highways; this was notable since Russia had reduced its overall activities in Syria (apart from defending its own assets) after Erdogan and Vladimir Putin contacted each other on 28 February. However, opposition sources told Reuters that clashes continued in western parts of the town and the SNA said it had prevented Russian Military Police from entering; SOHR said rebels were trying to regain control while Al Jazeera reported that rebels were in control of the western part of the city while government control was limited to the eastern (industrial) zone.

The same day, SOHR and Al-Masdar reported that the Syrian Army launched a counterattack against the rebel advance in southern Idlib, recapturing the town of Hazarin and several other locations in the Zawiya mountains, which overlooks the M4 highway, but Turkish sources said the towns were captured by the SNA from government troops and Iranian-backed militias and that fighting continued in Saraqib. Heavy fighting involving the SNA and pro-government forces was also reported in Kafr Nabl. Turkish sources reported that three more villages were retaken by the opposition in Idlib, making a total of 12 in the Turkish-backed offensive. The SOHR reported fatalities in the ranks of Turkish soldiers as a result of Syrian government shelling on Turkish positions in Sarmin. Ambulances were reported to have been moving towards the Bab al-Hawa Border Crossing. A Bulgarian defense blog BulgarianMilitary.com, citing Israeli and Russian online sources, reported that a Turkish rejection of an Iranian demand to cease operations in Syria led to Iranian-backed forces on the front lines launching a ballistic missile at Turkish troops on the country's border, which was destroyed by Turkish air defenses. Turkish forces also asserted that the missile had been intercepted. Meanwhile, the U.S. government continued to express some support for Turkey, saying it would provide ammunition and aid and was examining a request for air defenses.

On 3 March, Syrian forces launched artillery strikes on Turkish forces located at Taftanaz airport, killing one Turkish soldier and leaving three wounded, according to the SOHR. A Turkish fighter jet downed a Syrian Aero L-39 Albatros over Idlib; the pilot of the aircraft managed to eject and Syrian Army units immediately began a ground search to rescue him. Rebel forces stated that they had found the pilot's dead body, while the Syrian Army later stated that they had recovered the pilot in good health after conducting a CSAR operation 2 kilometers behind rebel lines. In turn, SANA released footage of a crashed Turkish Bayraktar drone that they said had been shot down that day by government forces.

On the ground, the Syrian Army secured Saraqib and captured several surrounding villages after pushing back rebel forces that were being supported by Turkish artillery and air power. The previous day's clashes led to the deaths of 75 rebel and 40 pro-government fighters, according to SOHR and Al-Masdar, while Turkish airstrikes on government targets had reduced significantly amidst a further government advance toward the town of Afis. Turkish sources, however, reported continued fighting on the M4/M5 intersection near Saraqib. Turkish sources also reported opposition advances in the Zawiya mountains. BulgarianMilitary.com cited pro-government social media reports of a Turkish attack on Syrian Army positions in retaliation for pro-government forces bombing Turkish positions in rebel-held al-Tarnaba and al-Mastumah near Nayrab, west of Saraqib, with over 60 missiles, including OTR-21 Tochka TBMs. According to SOHR, four Turkish soldiers were killed and seven wounded, while BulgarianMilitary.com reported that the attack killed 12 and injured eight Turkish soldiers.

On 4 March, opposition sources reported that Turkish-backed rebels launched a renewed attack on Saraqib and that Turkish drone strikes in support of the operation killed at least nine pro-government fighters. In turn, the Turkish Defense Ministry said that two Turkish soldiers were killed and six others were wounded by attacks from Syrian forces. Turkish media reported Iran sent reinforcements to front lines: 2,000 members of its proxy militias and IRGC-Quds Force elements to Saraqib and 200 Liwa Fatemiyoun Brigade vehicles to Ma'arrat al-Nu'man, supported by Russian aerial cover. Opposition sources also reported SNA gains in Western Aleppo. Meanwhile, Russia claimed opposition elements injured themselves while attempting to deploy chemical weapons in Saraqib.

On the morning of 5 March, opposition sources and The Independent reported a major Russian airstrike on an IDP camp near Maarrat Misrin, killing at least 15. Opposition sources reported government and Iranian militia artillery strikes on Saraqib, Kafr Nabl, al-Futayra and Kafr Oweid and Russian air raids on villages in the Zawiya mountains; the sources also reported that NFL fighters inflicted casualties on pro-government fighters in southern Idlib and western Hama.

Turkey's coordinated counterattack with electronic warfare and drones halted the Syrian Army and its allies' advances toward Idlib, destroyed the Syrian Army's offensive capabilities, and locked the front line parallel to the M4 highway. Many strategists and military experts including Francis Fukuyama stated that thanks to this revolutionary new generation military tactic developed by Turkey, the Turkish Army was able to bypass Syrian and Russian air defense systems and destroy enemy targets without being seen on radar.

==== Combat casualties ====
The Turkish military updated its figures for Syrian Army losses due to Turkish operations to 3,138 soldiers and militia killed or wounded, plus the following materiel losses: 3 fighter jets, 8 helicopters, 3 UAVs, 151 tanks, 47 howitzers, 52 launchers, 12 antitank weapons, 4 mortars, 10 arsenal depots and 145 military, technical and combat vehicles. By 8 March, Lost Armor's database had posted images of 65 destroyed armored vehicles belonging to the SAA since 14 January 2019. These included 17 self-propelled guns, 15 infantry fighting vehicles, 13 main battle tanks, 2 armored reconnaissance vehicles, 1 MRAP, and 17 others. In turn Turkish losses included 3 M60 main battle tanks and 2 APCs destroyed, rebels lost 4 main battle tanks, 7 IFVs, 3 APCs and 1 self-propelled gun.

The Middle East Institute reported that the Syrian Army lost 405 soldiers between 28 February and 6 March 129 of whom died on 5 March alone. This week was the bloodiest week the regime had seen in Syria in recent times. Thirty of those killed were high-ranking officers and among the dead was the operations commander. The institute's report also noted that the Syrian Army and its allies suffered heavy losses in terms of equipment, losing 73 tanks and armored vehicles, as well as a large amount of equipment.

Military researcher Oryx Blog, in its research, found 37 tanks of the T-55, T-62 and T-72 models, 9 BMP-1 armored combat vehicles, 16 2S1 Gvozdika howitzers, 1 122 mm howitzer 2A18 (D-30) gun, 3 M-46 guns, 1 152-mm howitzer M1943 (D-1) gun, 6 2S3 Akatsiya howitzers, 8 BM-21 Grad MLRS, 1 122mm HM-20 MLRS, 2 x 122mm MRL MLRS ,2 160mm M160 mortars, 1 240mm M240 mortar, 4 ZSU-23-4 armored anti-aircraft vehicles, 2 ZU-23-2 anti-aircraft guns, 1 S-75 Dvina surface-to-air anti-aircraft missile system, 2 Pantsir-S1 surface-to-air anti-aircraft and artillery systems, 1 SNR-125 air defense radar, 2 Sukhoi Su-24 fighter jets, 1 Aero L-39 Albatros fighter jet, 2 Mil Mi-8 combat helicopters and 21 different types of trucks were destroyed in the TSK attack.

=== Second Russia–Turkey ceasefire ===
On 5 March 2020, the presidents of Turkey and Russia, Erdoğan and Putin, met in Moscow for high-level talks. According to the statements made by the Turkish and Russian leaders following their one-on-one meeting, a ceasefire in the area of Idlib was to come into force from 00:00 hrs on 6 March. The terms of the ceasefire included a secure corridor 6 kilometers either side of the M4 highway, to be patrolled jointly by Russia and Turkey beginning on 15 March.

There were reports of Russian and Syrian bombardments continuing after the ceasefire came into effect, with activists noting artillery shelling from the government military camp at Jurin targeting Al-Ziyarah, from Ma'arrat al-Nu'man targeting Bara, and from Saraqib targeting Sarmin. Turkish media reported a total of 15 violations in the first day. However, the next day the ceasefire was reported to have largely held, apart from engagements between Syrian government forces and non-Turkish-backed rebel jihadists taking place in the Zawiya mountain area which left nine fighters of the Turkistan Islamic Party and six government troops dead. On 7 March, the fragile truce remained largely in force. Turkey said there were no ceasefire violations, although Russia reported several cases of militant gunfire in Idlib, Aleppo and Latakia governorates.

On 8 March, after heavy shelling in violation of the ceasefire, Syrian Army forces captured the villages of Ma'arat Muqas and al-Burayi, near Kafr Nabl, in an uncontested attack, but later retreated—apparently under pressure from Russia. Opposition sources reported hundreds of Turkish reinforcements with 100 tanks entering Idlib the same day. Opposition activists reported that the Syrian military shelled the village of al-Mastouma near a Turkish observation point on 9 March. Turkey described this as a "small violation" of the ceasefire.

A Russian military delegation visited Ankara on 10 March to discuss implementation of the security corridor. By 11 March, Turkey was reporting multiple small violations of the ceasefire, and vowed to respond heavily if their military posts in Idlib came under attack.

On 12 March, in an apparent ceasefire violation, SOHR reported that the SAA and allies entered the settlements of Maarrat Mukhas and al-Burayj in southern Idlib without any resistance. Government forces reportedly advanced into the same areas on 7 March before withdrawing due to heavy shelling by opposition factions.

== Aftermath and Russian–Turkish joint patrols ==
On 15 March 2020, Turkish and Russian troops began joint patrols on the M4 highway as a part of the ceasefire agreement between Turkey and Russia.

On 18 March, Turkish troops entered the de-escalation zone to reopen the M4 highway previously blocked by Hay'at Tahrir al-Sham and jihadist factions.

On 19 March, two Turkish soldiers were killed and a third was wounded by an attack carried out by radical groups in Idlib, according to the Turkish Ministry of Defense.

On 2 April 2020, the Syrian Observatory for Human Rights reported sporadic clashes in the de-escalation zone and suspended Syrian Government and Russian Air Force activity as part of the ceasefire as it entered the 28th consecutive day.

After a period of calm, the Syrian government and Turkey both sent reinforcements to the area in late May and early June. There were numerous ceasefire violations, and Syrian government ground bombardment recommenced in late May and several Russian airstrikes were conducted on the borders of Hama, Latakia and Idlib provinces on 3 June, reportedly displacing hundreds of people. A Turkish armoured ambulance was struck by unknown belligerents on 5 June. Russian air raids continued on 8 June, targeting Jabal al-Zawiya (Zawiya Mountain), southern Idlib, and towns in Sahl al-Ghab (Al-Ghab Plain), killing two civilians.

Hurras al-Din and other al-Qaeda-affiliated jihadi groups formed an operations room, "Be Steadfast", to co-ordinate their efforts against the government and challenge HTS domination of the area.

== Humanitarian consequences ==
The offensive was characterised by indiscriminate aerial bombing and shelling of civilian homes, mainly either by Russian planes, taking off from the Russian base in Latakia, or by Syrian government jets flying from Kuweires Military Aviation Institute, 18 miles east of Aleppo.

On 23 December 2019, the United Nations stated that the renewed fighting that started on 18 December had caused an exodus of 80,000 people across Idlib Governorate. According to SOHR, in the week up to 24 December 100,000 people were displaced because of the fighting as well as Syrian and Russian bombing. More than 235,000 civilians were displaced as of 27 December 2019 per the United Nations. By 5 February 2020, 300 civilians had been killed in the fighting, including 49 in the first five days of February, and 520,000 were displaced (80% of the latter women and children), according to the UN and various NGOs. By 10 February 2020, the number of displaced civilians had reached 689,000.

The humanitarian impact of the fighting was made more severe by extreme cold weather, with Save the Children, the International Rescue Committee and the International Organisation on Migration reporting that many children were dying due to sub-zero temperatures. By 14 February 10 Canadian aid organisations reported that 142,000 people had fled their homes in the past five days alone, including 6,500 children a day, bringing the total number of people displaced to over 800,000 since December. By 17 February, the United Nations Office for the Coordination of Humanitarian Affairs estimated that the northwestern Syria offensive since December has displaced 900,000 people. By late February, estimates had risen to 950,000. By early March, estimates had risen to 980,000.

According to the UN, 82,000 displaced people were living in the freezing open air in February; 36% of newly displaced families are housed by relatives or find rental accommodation, 17% found refuge in camps, over 15% sought shelter in unfinished buildings and 12% are still "looking for shelter". Many of the displaced have been forced to move multiple times. Some of the displaced people have escaped to Syrian Democratic Forces controlled Manbij.

Hospitals were heavily targeted in the fighting. Some 70 hospitals were bombed out of action. On 12 February, Islamic Relief reported that 15 medical facilities it supported had been damaged or fully destroyed, at least 55 sites where they distributed food recorded 428 nearby airstrikes near these locations, and 90% of staff in Idlib had been forcibly displaced.

School buildings were also targeted. On 25 February, Amnesty International condemned the shelling of ten schools in Idlib and Aleppo countryside, describing it as a war crime. After the 25 February attack, all schools in Idlib were suspended. In July, a UN investigation said war crimes and possible crimes against humanity were committed during the campaign. The Independent International Commission of Inquiry on the Syrian Arab Republic said people suffered incomprehensible misery. It recorded assaults by all sides in the conflict that resulted in civilian casualties or damage to civilian infrastructure. It found shelled schools, market bombings, and hospitals bombed.

== Reactions ==
=== Supranational ===
- United Nations – Spokesman for the United Nations High Commissioner for Human Rights Rupert Colville, asked if Syria and Russia were deliberately targeting civilians and protected buildings, and said: "The sheer quantity of attacks on hospitals, medical facilities, and schools would suggest they cannot all be accidental." United Nations High Commissioner for Human Rights Michelle Bachelet said: "Entire families, some who have fled from one corner of Syria to the other over the course of the past decade, are tragically finding that bombs are part of their everyday life. How can anyone justify carrying out such indiscriminate and inhumane attacks?"
- European Union – The European Union condemned the offensive in Idlib and warned of a looming humanitarian disaster. The EU also urged all sides to adhere to international law, allow humanitarian aid to reach those in need and vowed to deliver aid to civilians in Idlib.
- Arab League – The Arab League called for an immediate armistice in Idlib. The regional organization labeled the offensive a blatant violation of international law causing a humanitarian disaster for Syrians.

=== National ===
- Italy – On 25 December 2019, Italian foreign minister Luigi Di Maio, while speaking about his country's desire to establish a ceasefire in Libya's ongoing civil war, said that the situations in Libya and Syria were similar.
- House of Representatives – On 2 March 2020, the Syrian government announced that the Libyan Embassy in Damascus could be reopened after 8 years shutdown, the interim government based in Libya's Tobruk signed a memorandum of understanding with Syrian Government officials to re-open its diplomatic missions and confront Turkish "interference".
- Turkey – On 31 January 2020, Turkish president Recep Tayyip Erdogan has called for the Syrian government to end its offensive in Idlib, and has threatened military action unless it does so. On 4 March 2020, during a speech by an opposition Parliament member who accused President Erdogan of disrespecting Turkish soldiers who died in Syria and the military intervention, a brawl took place, dozens of parliamentarians traded punches, while others tried to stop the fighting.
- United Arab Emirates – On the UAE's 48th National Day (2 December 2019), an Emirati official at the UAE embassy in Damascus praised the Syrian government's actions and said that Syria's president Bashar al-Assad was acting wisely.
- United States – On 26 December 2019, United States president Donald Trump warned via Twitter that "Russia, Syria, and Iran are killing, or on their way to killing, thousands of innocent civilians in Idlib Province," and added that "Turkey is working hard to stop this carnage." US ambassador to Syria James Jeffrey has warned that the offensive would create a humanitarian crisis. US Secretary of State Mike Pompeo condemned Russia, Iran, Hezbollah and the Syrian government's actions in Idlib and said that they were intentionally preventing the implementation of a cease-fire in northern Syria.
- China – China's United Nations Ambassador Zhang Jun said on 28 January 2020 that "terrorism is an underlying factor" in the conflict and "eradicating the forces of terror is a necessary requirement for the restoration of peace and stability in Syria and the region. [Terrorists] should be resolutely crushed, and safe havens established by terrorist forces in Syria should be liquidated. At the same time, counter-terrorism operations should be cautious not to harm civilians."

=== Local ===
- Hay'at Tahrir al-Sham – In response to 19 December offensive, Hay'at Tahrir al-Sham leader Abu Mohammad al-Julani said in a video statement that the offensive would negatively affect regional stability and the lives of people throughout the region, namely the Levant, Turkey, Saudi Arabia, Yemen, Iraq and the Persian Gulf. He also said that HTS has achieved many of its goals in Syria, such as weakening the state of the Syrian military and the Syrian economy; he criticized Russia's role in supporting the Syrian government as an attempt to restore the level of influence Russia had during the Soviet-era.

== See also ==
- Battle of Aleppo (2012–2016)
- National Front for Liberation–Tahrir al-Sham conflict
- 2024 Syrian opposition offensives
- Battle of Aleppo (2024)
- Operation Dawn of Freedom
