= Hazarin =

Hazarin حزارين Hazzarin
- Town
- Location in Syria
- Coordinates: 35°35′56″N 36°31′39″E
- Country: Syria
- Governorate: Idlib
- District: Maarrat al-Nu'man
- Subdistrict: Kafr Nabl
- Boroughs: Jaish al-Fatah
- Elevation: 605 m (1,985 ft)

Population (2004)
  - Total: 2,373
- Time zone: UTC+2 (EET)
  - Summer (DST): UTC+3 (EEST)

Hazarin (Arabic: حزارين, also spelled Hazzarin) is a town in northwestern Syria, administratively belonging to the Idlib Governorate, located 60 kilometers southwest of Idlib. Nearby localities include Kafr Oweid to the northwest, al-Barah to the north, Kafr Nabl to the northeast, Basqala to the east, Maarrat Harma to the south and Fatirah and Safuhin to the west. According to the Syria Central Bureau of Statistics, Hazarin had a population of 2,373 in the 2004 census.

In the 19th century, during late Ottoman rule, Hazarin was a village largely constructed out of the columns and other ruins of an ancient and prosperous town. It is situated among the Dead Cities region. Today, the town is well known locally for its olive oil, and residents cultivate olives, figs, wheat, barley and chickpeas. Hazarin provides services to the surrounding villages and contains two primary schools, one secondary school and a municipal headquarters. During the Northwestern Syria offensive (December 2019–March 2020), the town was recaptured by the Syrian Army.

== Bibliography ==
- Edwards, B. B. (1848). Bibliotheca Sacra. Vol. 5. Dallas Theological Seminary.
