= Elward =

Elward is a surname and a given name. Notable people with the name include:

Surname:

- Eric Elward, character in Goodnight Sweetheart
- James Elward (1928–1996), American author, actor, screenwriter and playwright
- John Elward (1935–2024), Australian rules footballer
- Mal Elward (1892–1982), American football player, coach, college athletics administrator
- Paul Elward (1926–2009), American politician

Given name:

- Borlase Elward Wyndham Childs (1876–1946), British Army officer, Assistant Commissioner of Police of the Metropolis
- Elward Thomas Brady Jr. (1926–2007), businessman from Louisiana who served in the Louisiana House of Representatives

== See also ==
- Rasm Elward, Syrian village in Hama District
