= Operation Spring Shield =

Turkish military operation in Syria

- Part of the 2019–2020 northwestern Syria offensive and Turkish military operations in Idlib as part of Turkish involvement in the Syrian civil war
- The situation after the ceasefire
Date	27 February – 6 March 2020 (1 week and 1 day)
Location	Northwestern Syria: Latakia Governorate; Aleppo Governorate; Idlib Governorate; Hama Governorate
Result	Ceasefire
Territorial changes	Syrian government offensive on Idlib halted; Turkish Armed Forces and their allies capture the Zawiya Mountain and 18 villages; Syrian government forces and their allies capture the strategic Saraqib city and 4 villages

Belligerents
Turkey	Syria; Iran; Hezbollah; Supported by: Russia

Commanders and leaders
(Turkey) Hulusi Akar; (Minister of National Defense); (Turkey) Gen. Yaşar Güler; (Chief of the Turkish General Staff); (Turkey) Lt. Gen Sinan Yayla; (2nd Army commander)	Suheil al-Hassan; Maher al-Assad; Brig. Gen. Burhan Rahmun †; (commander of 124 Brigade of Republican Guard); Brig. Gen. Ismael Ali †; Col. Mazar Farwati †

Units involved
Turkish Armed Forces: Turkish Land Forces; Turkish Air Force	Syrian Armed Forces: Syrian Arab Army; Syrian Arab Air Force; Syrian Air Defense Force; Iran: IRGC; Lebanese Hezbollah

Strength
8,350–20,000	Unknown

Casualties and losses
Per Turkey: 40 killed 81 wounded (including Balyun airstrikes) Materiel: 4 combat drones; destroyed or lost	Per Turkey: (Note: Includes losses since 10 February 2020): (Syria) 3,159 killed or wounded; 8 helicopters; 2 SU-24 type aircraft; 1 L-39 type aircraft; 3 UAVs; 151 tanks; 51 other armored vehicles; 54 MLRS; 49 artillery; 34 technicals; 8 air defense systems (including 1 SA-17 and 2 SA-22); 12 ATGMs; 10 ammunition storages; Per SOHR: (Syria) 170 soldiers and 27 militiamen killed (between 15th of January and the 5th of March 2020); Per Middle East Institute: (Syria) 405 government soldiers and militias killed (between 28th of February and the 6th of March 2020); Including: 9–14 killed, 30 wounded (Iran) 21 killed Materiel (per independent sources): 73 armored vehicles lost (T-55, T-62, T-72 tanks, BMP-1 armored vehicles); 26 artillery guns and 12 MLRS; 7 ZU-23 and ZSU-23 air defence guns and 2 Pantsir missile systems; 2 SU-24 and 1 L-39 shot down
- a Includes losses since 10 February 2020.

Operation Spring Shield (Turkish: Bahar Kalkanı Harekâtı) was a cross-border military operation carried out by the Turkish Armed Forces (TSK) in the Idlib Governorate of northwestern Syria against the Syrian Armed Forces and allied militias. The operation was launched on 27 February 2020 in direct response to the Balyun airstrikes, aiming to address the escalating situation in the region.

According to Turkish Defense Minister Hulusi Akar, the primary objective of Operation Spring Shield was to achieve a ceasefire agreement within the framework of the Astana talks and to establish stability in the Second Northern Syria Buffer Zone. Additionally, the operation sought to prevent the mass migration of people from Idlib to the Turkish border, a pressing humanitarian concern.

On 5 March, Turkey and Russia signed a ceasefire agreement in Moscow, marking a step towards de-escalation in the region.

== Background ==
On 27 February 2020, during the Dawn of Idlib 2 Operation, Turkish Army positions in Balyun, Idlib Governorate, came under attack from airstrikes allegedly conducted by the Syrian Air Force, and allegedly the Russian Air Force. Resulting in the deaths of 33 Turkish soldiers, with a reported number of wounded ranging from 36 to 60.

The following day, Russia denied it had carried out the airstrikes and stated that it had made efforts to halt the Syrian military's firing to facilitate the safe evacuation of the Turkish troops. Russia said that the Turkish forces should not have been present in the area, where "counter-terror operations" were underway, and criticized Turkey for failing to notify them about the soldiers' presence in advance. On the contrary, Turkey maintained that Russia was well aware of the locations of Turkish troops, as the two countries regularly communicated about this matter.

== Operation timeline ==
=== 27–28 February ===
Following the air attack in Balyun, Turkey officially launched its military intervention, initiating Operation Spring Shield. The primary objective of this operation was to put a stop to the Syrian government forces' advancement on Syrian rebels in Idlib and push them back to their pre-offensive positions.

On 28 February, the Turkish Ministry of National Defense reported that the Turkish armed forces had responded to the airstrikes and claimed to have "neutralized" 329 Syrian troops. Additionally, they claimed to have successfully destroyed five helicopters, 23 tanks, 10 armored vehicles, 23 artillery and howitzers, one SA-17, and one SA-22 air defense systems belonging to the Syrian government.

A Syrian military official acknowledged that their armored and technical vehicles had been heavily targeted, resulting in significant destruction of their arsenal in northwestern Syria.

A Turkish soldier, 11 Syrian soldiers and four members of the Lebanese Hezbollah were killed during the day.

=== 29 February ===
On 29 February, Turkish airstrikes targeted the Syrian Scientific Studies and Research Center in As-Safira, which a Turkish official claimed was used to develop chemical weapons.

During the day, 48 Syrian government soldiers and militias, including 14 Hezbollah fighters were killed and at least 13 military vehicles were destroyed by Turkish strikes.

=== 1 March ===
On 1 March, two Syrian Su-24 jets were shot down by Turkish Air Force F-16s. All four Syrian pilots safely ejected. Both Syrian and Turkish forces confirmed the downing. Meanwhile a Turkish TAI Anka drone was shot down by Syrian forces. Additionally, Turkish drones bombed the 47th brigade in Hama Military Airport.

During the day, 19 Syrian soldiers were killed by Turkish drones attacks in Jabal al-Zawiya and Al-Hamidia, Idlib countryside.

=== 2 March ===
On 2 March, a Turkish Bayraktar TB2 drone was shot down by Syrian Air Defense Force near Saraqib. During the day, a Turkish soldier and 26 Syrian government soldiers were killed in the clashes in Jabal Al-Zawiyah, south Idlib countryside, Saraqib and its countryside.

=== 3 March ===
On 3 March, the Syrian Army captured the strategic city of Saraqib and several surrounding villages after pushing back rebel forces supported by Turkish artillery and air power. The Turkish airstrikes on government targets reduced significantly amidst a further government advance toward the town of Afis. Concurrently, a Syrian Air Force Aero L-39 Albatros was shot downed by a Turkish F-16 over Idlib, with conflicting reports over the pilots fate. Meanwhile, a Turkish Bayraktar drone was shot down by the Syrian Army in the western Aleppo countryside.

During the day, the Syrian Observatory claimed that five Turkish soldiers were killed by Syrian bombardment in Taftanaz Airbase, Al-Tarnaba and Al-Mastouma camp. The Turkish Ministry of Defense did not confirm this attack or the deaths of five soldiers.

=== 4 March 2020 ===
On 4 March, Turkish sources claimed that Suheil al-Hassan was wounded by a drone strike near Saraqib. A Turkish Bayraktar TB2 was shot down by Syrian forces in the Idlib Governorate.

During the day, 19 Syrian soldiers and seven non-Syrian fighters were killed by Turkish ground shelling and drones in Idlib countryside.

== Ceasefire ==
On 5 March 2020, the presidents of Turkey and Russia, Erdoğan and Putin, met in Moscow for high-level talks. According to the statements made by the Turkish and Russian leaders following their one-on-one meeting, a ceasefire in the area of Idlib was to come into force from 00:00 hrs on 6 March. The terms of the ceasefire included a secure corridor 6 kilometers either side of the M4 highway, to be patrolled jointly by Russia and Turkey beginning on 15 March.

== Syrian Government losses ==
On February 29, Reuters reported that nine Hezbollah militants were killed and 30 wounded in an attack by the Turkish Air Force. It was announced that 4 tanks, 5 artillery pieces/MLRS, 3 anti-tank vehicles were destroyed and 184 Syrian soldiers were killed between March 4–5 in Operation Spring Shield. According to Turkey's claims, 3,322 Syrian soldiers were neutralized between February 27 and March 5.

Middle East Institute think tank found that 405 Syrian government soldiers including 30 senior officers were killed in the week between February 27 and March 6. The institute's report also noted that the Syrian army lost 73 tanks and armored vehicles, as well as a large number of anti-aircraft guns and artillery pieces. It was determined that the death toll suffered by the regime on the same front between March 1 and May 31 was more than 600. The report did not mention the number of wounded. New Lines Institute reported that it received information from sources close to the American government, and that as a result of the Turkish Armed Forces' attack, the Syrian Army lost 3 warplanes, 3 UAVs, 8 helicopters, 135 tanks, 86 artillery and MLRS, 77 armored vehicles, 9 ammunition depots, 5 air defense systems, and 16 anti-tank and mortar positions. It was also stated that an average of 60 regime soldiers were thought to have been killed per day between February 27 and March 5.

The OSINT Oryx Blog, in its research, found 37 tanks of the T-55, T-62 and T-72 models, 9 BMP-1 armored combat vehicles, 16 2S1 Gvozdika howitzers, 1 122 mm howitzer 2A18 (D-30) gun, 3 M-46 guns, 1 152 mm howitzer M1943 (D-1) gun, 6 2S3 Akatsiya howitzers, 8 BM-21 Grad MLRS, 1 122mm HM-20 MLRS, 2 x 122mm MRL MLRS, 2 160mm M160 mortars, 1 240mm M240 mortar, 4 ZSU-23-4 armored anti-aircraft vehicles, 2 ZU-23-2 anti-aircraft guns, 1 S-75 Dvina surface-to-air anti-aircraft missile system, 2 Pantsir-S1 surface-to-air anti-aircraft and artillery systems, 1 SNR-125 air defense radar, 2 Sukhoi Su-24 fighter jets, 1 Aero L-39 Albatros fighter jet and 21 different types of trucks were destroyed in the TSK attack.

Institute for the Study of War, Rand Corporation and many think tanks, primarily, stated that the operation carried out by the Turkish Armed Forces revolutionized modern warfare tactics and changed the balance of power in Syria. The precision attacks carried out by the TSK with Koral electronic warfare systems and TB-2- and ANKA-type armed UAV systems neutralized the air defense systems of the Assad Regime forces. The Turkish operation stopped the Syrian government desires to reclaim all Idlib. As a result of the TAF's counterattack, the regime forces' offensive capacity was eliminated.

== Aftermath ==
Since the signing of the ceasefire in March 2020, the Syrian Air Force has not conducted any airstrikes within the de-escalation zone, and this status remains unchanged as of April 2023.

Fukuyama stated that Turkey has made a revolution in the military use of drones and caused a change in modern military tactics.

== See also ==
- Syrian–Turkish border clashes during the Syrian civil war
- Operation Peace Spring
- Operation Olive Branch
- Operation Euphrates Shield
- List of wars involving Turkey
