= December 2011 Jabal al-Zawiya massacres =

Event in the Syrian Civil War

- Part of the Idlib Governorate clashes (September 2011–March 2012)
Date	19–20 December 2011 (1 day)
Location	Jabal al-Zawiya, Syria 35.9252006°N 36.5693665°E
Result	Ba'athist Syrian Army victory

Belligerents
(Syrian opposition) Free Syrian Army	Ba'athist Syria: Syrian Army

Units involved
Unknown	15th Division: 35th Army Regiment

Strength
~300	~500

Casualties and losses
235+ killed	60–100 killed
- 120 civilians killed
- Location within Syria

The Jabal al-Zawiya massacres took place on 19–20 December 2011, in the Idlib province of Syria during the 2011-2012 Idlib Governorate clashes between the Ba'athist Syrian Army and opposition forces, within the larger scope of the Syrian uprising. Human rights and opposition activists said that some 200 people were killed by Ba'athist Syrian security forces in the hills and villages of the north-western province of Idlib on 19 and 20 December 2011. The at the time Ba'athist Syrian state news agency claimed that 1 terrorist was killed and several more wounded.

The event occurred following a large scale defection of hundreds of Syrian soldiers on 19 December, while some 70 of them were gunned down by loyalists. On 20 December, government forces backed by tanks reportedly launched an operation to hunt down the defectors who managed to escape.

== Events ==
On 19 December, the FSA suffered its largest loss of life when new defectors tried to abandon their positions and bases between the villages of Kansafra and Kafr Oweid in Idlib province. Opposition activist groups, specifically the Syrian Observatory for Human rights, reported that 72 defectors were killed as they were gunned down during their attempted escape. The Ba'athist Syrian Army lost three soldiers during the clashes. The next day, SOHR stated that in all 100 defectors were killed or wounded. Also, the same day, the SOHR updated its number of civilians killed by government security forces in the province for the previous day from 37 to 111. It had been called a "massacre".

Alaa El Din Al Youssef, a Syrian opposition member in Idlib, described the government's attack on the area of Idlib and Jabal al-Zawiya as a massacre.

"Civilians were surrounded by security forces who killed 100 of us. The corpses of those killed were left in the streets and the mosques and we are not allowed to bury any of them."

"Some of those killed cannot be recognised. Some were burnt and some beheaded with their hands tied. We are really scared because the area might be stormed once again."

This claim cannot be independently confirmed.

The clashes continued into the next day, and another report, by Lebanese human rights activist Wissam Tarif, put the death toll even higher with 163 defectors, 97 government troops and nine civilians killed on the second day alone as the military tracked down the soldiers and civilians that managed to initially escape. On 21 December, it was reported that the FSA had taken control over large swathes of Idlib province including some towns and villages.
