= Civil conflict in Turkey =

Civil conflict in Turkey may refer to these instances of armed civil conflict in modern Turkey:

- Communist insurgency in Turkey
  - Maoist insurgency in Turkey
  - DHKP/C Marxist-Lenin insurgency in Turkey
- Islamist conflicts in Turkey
  - Political violence in Turkey (1976–1980)
  - Turkey–Islamic State conflict
- Kurdish–Turkish conflict
  - Kurdish Hezbollah insurgency
  - Kurdistan Workers' Party insurgency
- Mass or regular killings
  - List of assassinated people from Turkey
  - List of massacres in Turkey
- Turkish coup d'état
  - 1960 Turkish coup d'état
  - 1971 Turkish military memorandum
  - 1980 Turkish coup d'état
  - 1993 alleged Turkish military coup
  - 1997 Turkish military memorandum

== See also ==
- Turkey's conflicts
  - Riots and civil disorder in Turkey
  - List of wars involving Turkey
- Turkey's ongoing conflicts with other nations
  - Armenia–Turkey conflict
  - Cyprus-Turkey conflict
  - Cyprus–Turkey maritime zones dispute
  - Greece–Turkey conflict
