= Jobas =

Jobas جوباس
- Village
- Location in Syria
- Coordinates: 35°50′9″N 36°45′35″E
- Country: Syria
- Governorate: Idlib
- District: Idlib District
- Subdistrict: Saraqib Nahiyah

Population (2004)
  - Total: 2,340
- Time zone: UTC+2 (EET)
  - Summer (DST): UTC+3 (EEST)
- City Qrya Pcode: C3909

Jobas (Arabic: جوباس) is a Syrian village located in Saraqib Nahiyah in Idlib District, Idlib. According to the Syria Central Bureau of Statistics (CBS), Jobas had a population of 2340 in the 2004 census.

== Syrian Civil War ==
During the Syrian Civil War, the town was controlled by the Jihadist Tahrir al-Sham.

In 2020, the town was recaptured by Syrian Army forces during the 'Dawn of Idlib 2' campaign and became a part of the new Idlib frontline.

On 8 August 2022, 3 Uzbek jihadis were killed after carrying out an attack on Syrian Army positions in the town.
