= Nayrab, Idlib =

Nayrab, Idlib النيرب
- Village
- Location in Syria
- Coordinates: 35°52′11″N 36°43′13″E
- Country: Syria
- Governorate: Idlib
- District: Idlib District
- Subdistrict: Idlib

Population (2004)
  - Total: 2,675
- Time zone: UTC+2 (EET)
  - Summer (DST): UTC+3 (EEST)
- City Qrya Pcode: C3867

Nayrab, Idlib (Arabic: النيرب) is a village located in Idlib Nahiyah in Idlib District, Idlib Governorate, Syria. According to the Syria Central Bureau of Statistics (CBS), Nayrab, Idlib had a population of 2,675 in the 2004 census.

As part of the Idlib Governorate, it was under the control of the Syrian opposition, including the Free Syrian Army, Jabhat Fateh al-Sham, and Tahrir al-Sham. It was temporarily captured by the Syrian regime in February 2020 until being recaptured by the opposition. As a village near the ceasefire lines implemented in March 2020, from it forces of Tahrir al-Sham would also begin Operation Deterrence of Aggression, quickly securing nearby Saraqib that fell in the previous offensives of 2020 in late November 2024.
