= List of wars involving Turkey =

This is a list of wars involving the Republic of Turkey and includes conflicts such as coups, insurgencies, offensives, border and international disputes since the Turkish War of Independence in 1919. For wars before 1919, involving the Ottoman Empire, see List of wars involving the Ottoman Empire.

Turkish victory
Another result *
Turkish defeat
Ongoing conflict

*e.g. a treaty or peace without a clear result, status quo ante bellum, result of civil or internal conflict, result unknown or indecisive, inconclusive

== Wars ==
Conflict	Turkey and allies	Opponent(s)	Results	Leaders	
Conflict	Turkey and allies	Opponent(s)	Results	President(s)	Prime Minister(s) / Vice President(s)
War of Independence (1919–1922): Franco-Turkish War (1918–1921); Greco-Turkish War (1919–1922); Turkish–Armenian War (1920)	Turkish Nationalists: Ankara Government (1919–1920; 1920–1923) Also: Azerbaijan (1918–1920); Aras Republic (1918–1919); Iğdır National Republic (1918–1920); Provisional Kars Government (1918–1919); Green Army (1919–1920); Oltu Council Government (1919–1920); Kurdistan (1919; 1921–1923)	Allied powers: Greece France (until 1921)^{[c]}: French West Africa; Armenian Legion; Algeria; Morocco; Tunisia; United Kingdom^{[d]}: India; Armenia (in 1920) Istanbul Government^{[e]} (in 1920): Other pro-Istanbul rebels; Georgia (in 1921) Separatists: Pontic Greek rebels; Kurdish rebels; Assyrian rebels; Green Army (1920–1921)	Turkish victory: Establishment of the Republic of Turkey	Mustafa Kemal Atatürk	Fevzi Çakmak Rauf Orbay Fethi Okyar
Sheikh Said rebellion (1925)	Turkey	Azadî	Victory: Revolt suppressed	Mustafa Kemal Atatürk	İsmet İnönü
Ararat rebellion (1927–1930)	Turkey	Republic of Ararat	Victory: Revolt suppressed	Mustafa Kemal Atatürk	İsmet İnönü
Dersim massacre (1937–1938)	Turkey	Kurdish Alevi rebels	Victory: Revolt suppressed	Mustafa Kemal Atatürk	İsmet İnönü Celâl Bayar
World War II (1939–1945): Turkish declaration of war on Germany and Japan	United States; Soviet Union; United Kingdom; China; France; Poland; Canada; Australia; New Zealand; India; South Africa; Yugoslavia; Greece; Denmark; Norway; Netherlands; Belgium; Luxembourg; Czechoslovakia; Brazil; Mexico; Chile; Bolivia; Colombia; Ecuador; Paraguay; Peru; Venezuela; Uruguay; Argentina; Turkey	Germany; Japan; Italy; Hungary; Romania; Bulgaria; Croatia; Slovakia; Finland; Thailand; Manchukuo; Mengjiang	Victory: Collapse of the German Reich; Fall of Japanese and Italian Empires; Creation of the United Nations; Emergence of the United States and the Soviet Union as superpowers; Beginning of the Cold War	İsmet İnönü	Şükrü Saracoğlu
Korean War (1950–1953)	South Korea (United Nations) UN Command: United States; United Kingdom; Canada; Turkey; Australia; Philippines; New Zealand; Thailand; Ethiopia; Greece; France; Colombia; Belgium; South Africa; Netherlands; Luxembourg	North Korea; China; Soviet Union	Stalemate: Korean Armistice Agreement	Celâl Bayar	Adnan Menderes
Turkish invasion of Cyprus (1974)	Turkey; TMT	Cyprus; Greece	Victory: Turkish overall control of 36.2% of Cyprus	Fahri Korutürk	Bülent Ecevit
Kurdistan Workers' Party insurgency (1978–2025): Turkish operations during the conflict	Turkey; Ministry of National Defense; General Staff; Special Forces Command; (Turkey) TAF; Turkish Air Force; Turkish Land Forces; Turkish Naval Forces; Ministry of Interior; Turkish National Police; Police Special Operations; Gendarmerie General Command; JİTEM (until early 1990s); JÖH; Village Guards; National Intelligence Organization; Other forces: Counter-Guerrilla (Until 1992); Grey Wolves (Not militarily involved); Turkish Revenge Brigade (Not militarily involved); Some Kurdish tribes (until 1985; became Village Guards)	Kurdistan Communities Union; PKK; HPG; YJA-STAR; YDG-H: YPS; YPS-Jin; SDF; YPG; YPG International; YPJ; Anti-Terror Units; PJAK; YRK; HPJ; Sinjar Alliance; Êzîdxan Women's Units; Sinjar Resistance Units; HBDH; DKP; MKP-HKO-PHG; MLKP; THKP-C/MLSPB-DC; TKEP/L; TKP/ML; DK (until 2017) (Note: Merged with the Revolutionary Communard Party (DKP) in 2017.); International Freedom Battalion; TAK	2025 Turkey–PKK peace process: Arrest of Abdullah Öcalan on February 15, 1999, in Nairobi, Kenya.; Attempted peace process initiated in 2012, failed in 2015.; A second peace process initiated in 2024. Öcalan calls on PKK to disarm and dissolve on February 27, 2025, PKK declares unilateral ceasefire with Turkey and beginning of dissolution process on 1 March.; PKK convenes congress between 5-7 May, declares dissolution and end of conflict on 12 May 2025.	Fahri Korutürk Kenan Evren Turgut Özal Süleyman Demirel Ahmet Necdet Sezer Abdullah Gül Recep Tayyip Erdoğan	Bülent Ecevit Süleyman Demirel Bülend Ulusu Turgut Özal Yıldırım Akbulut Mesut Yılmaz Tansu Çiller Necmettin Erbakan Abdullah Gül Recep Tayyip Erdoğan Ahmet Davutoğlu Binali Yıldırım Fuat Oktay Cevdet Yılmaz
Gulf War (1990–1991)	Kuwait; United States; United Kingdom; Saudi Arabia; Egypt; France Coalition: Afghanistan; Syria; Morocco; Oman; Pakistan; Canada; United Arab Emirates; Qatar; Bangladesh; Italy; Australia; Netherlands; Germany; Philippines; Sweden; Turkey; Argentina; Senegal; Spain; Bahrain; Belgium; Poland; South Korea; Singapore; Norway; Czechoslovakia; Greece; Denmark; New Zealand; Hungary	Iraq: Republic of Kuwait (Iraqi puppet state)	Victory: Iraqi forces expelled from Kuwait; Kuwaiti independence restored; Destruction of Iraqi and Kuwaiti infrastructure; Shia and Kurdish uprisings against the Iraqi government; Saddam Hussein regime of the Iraqi Baathist government retains power in Iraq; UN sanctions against Iraq; Iraqi no-fly zones established; United Nations Security Council Resolution 687 establishes cease-fire terms, beginning of the Iraq disarmament controversies; State of Kuwait restored; Iraqi Kurdistan obtains autonomy, establishment of the northern Iraq no fly zone by the US'	Turgut Özal	Yıldırım Akbulut
Bosnian War (1995) (Participant in NATO Operation Deliberate Force)	NATO: Belgium; Canada; Denmark; France; Germany; Italy; Luxembourg; Netherlands; Norway; Portugal; Spain; Turkey; United Kingdom; United States	Republika Srpska	Victory: Turkey committed 8 of 173 aircraft in the NATO force, flew 2.2 percent of sorties; Dayton Agreement, deployment of NATO-led IFOR	Süleyman Demirel	Tansu Çiller
Iraqi Kurdish Civil War (1997)	KDP; Turkey	PUK; PKK	Ceasefire: Peace treaty between the KDP and the PUK	Süleyman Demirel	Necmettin Erbakan Mesut Yılmaz
Kosovo War (1998–1999) (Participant in NATO Operation Allied Force)	UÇK NATO: Belgium; Canada; Denmark; France; Germany; Italy; Luxembourg; Netherlands; Norway; Portugal; Spain; Turkey; United Kingdom; United States	FR Yugoslavia	Victory: Turkey committed 11 F-16 aircraft to the NATO force, and US use of air bases; Kumanovo Treaty	Süleyman Demirel	Mesut Yılmaz Bülent Ecevit
War in Afghanistan (2001–2021)	Afghanistan ISAF: United States; United Kingdom; Australia; Canada; Germany; France; Italy; Czech Republic; Netherlands; Turkey; Romania; Georgia; South Korea; Poland; Denmark; Sweden; Norway; Finland; Singapore; New Zealand; Mongolia; Hungary; Belgium; Estonia; Latvia; Lithuania; Portugal; Albania; Slovenia	(Afghanistan) Taliban	Taliban victory / Turkish-allied defeat: Fall of the Islamic Emirate of Afghanistan in 2001; International Security Assistance Force (ISAF) concluded their mission in 2014; Resolute Support Mission (RSM) was a non-combat mission and terminated in 2021 with the US-led withdrawal; Taliban control over Afghanistan increases compared to pre-intervention territory; Return of the Islamic Emirate of Afghanistan in 2021	Ahmet Necdet Sezer Abdullah Gül Recep Tayyip Erdoğan	Bülent Ecevit Abdullah Gül Recep Tayyip Erdoğan Ahmet Davutoğlu Binali Yıldırım Fuat Oktay
Boko Haram insurgency (2009–present)	Multinational Joint Task Force: Nigeria; Cameroon; Chad; Niger; Benin; Local militias and vigilantes: CJTF, BOYES (Nigeria); Comités de vigilance (Chad, Cameroon); Dan banga (Niger); Foreign mercenaries: STTEP; Turkey	Boko Haram (partially aligned with ISIL from 2015) (Note: Following Mohammed Yusuf's death, Boko Haram splintered into numerous factions which no longer operated under a unified leadership. Though Abubakar Shekau eventually became the preeminent commander of the movement, he never really controlled all Boko Haram groups. Instead, the factions were loosely allied, but also occasionally clashed with each other. This situation changed in 2015 when Shekau pledged allegiance to ISIL. The leadership of ISIL eventually decided to replace Shekau as a local commander with Abu Mus'ab al-Barnawi, whereupon the movement split completely. Shekau no longer recognized the authority of ISIL's central command, and his loyalists started to openly fight the followers of al-Barnawi. Regardless, Shekau did never officially renounce his pledge of allegiance to ISIL as a whole; his forces are thus occasionally regarded as "second branch of ISWAP". Overall, the relation of Shekau with ISIL remains confused and ambiguous.): Shekau faction; Several minor factions; (Islamic State) ISWAP (originally Barnawi faction of Boko Haram; from 2016); Ansaru (Note: The exact origin of Ansaru is unclear, but it had already existed as Boko Haram faction before officially announcing its foundation as separate group on 1 January 2012. The group has no known military presence in Nigeria since 2015, but several of its members appear to be still active.)	Ongoing	Abdullah Gül Recep Tayyip Erdoğan	Recep Tayyip Erdoğan Ahmet Davutoğlu Binali Yıldırım Fuat Oktay Cevdet Yılmaz
First Libyan Civil War (2011) (Assisted NATO military intervention)	(Libya) NTC; Qatar NATO coalition: United States; United Kingdom; France; Belgium; Bulgaria; Canada; Denmark; Greece; Italy; Netherlands; Norway; Romania; Spain; Turkey; Sweden; Jordan; United Arab Emirates	Libya	Victory: Turkey helped enforce the no-fly zone and naval blockade; The NTC assumed interim control of Libya	Abdullah Gül	Recep Tayyip Erdoğan
Syrian civil war (2011–2024): Operation Euphrates Shield (2016–2017); Operation Olive Branch (2018–2019); Operation Peace Spring (2019); Operation Spring Shield (2020); Operation Deterrence of Aggression (2024)	Syria: Syrian Opposition; Turkey; Qatar; Saudi Arabia (2012-2017, 2024)	(United Arab Republic) Ba'athist Syria; Russia; Iran; Hezbollah	Victory: Turkish occupation of Northern Syria; Turkish military operation in Idlib Governorate; Fall of the Assad regime in 2024; Defeat of the Iranian intervention in the Syrian civil war; Return of refugees of the Syrian civil war	Abdullah Gül Recep Tayyip Erdoğan	Recep Tayyip Erdoğan Ahmet Davutoğlu Binali Yıldırım Fuat Oktay Cevdet Yılmaz
Turkish involvement in the Syrian civil war (2011–2025): Operation Euphrates Shield (2016–2017); Operation Olive Branch (2018–2019); Operation Peace Spring (2019); Operation Spring Shield (2020)	Turkey; Syria: Syrian Opposition	Syrian Democratic Forces; IFB Islamic State of Iraq and the Levant (United Arab Republic) Ba'athist Syria; Russia; Iran (Libya) Libyan National Army; Hezbollah	Ongoing: Turkish occupation of Northern Syria; Turkish military operation in Idlib Governorate; Fall of the Assad regime in 2024; Syrian peace process	Abdullah Gül Recep Tayyip Erdoğan	Recep Tayyip Erdoğan Ahmet Davutoğlu Binali Yıldırım Fuat Oktay Cevdet Yılmaz
Mali War (2012–present)	Government of Mali: Military of Mali; France (2013–2022); Turkey (2014–present); Germany (2017–present) ECOWAS: Benin; Burkina Faso; Cape Verde; Gambia; Ghana; Guinea; Guinea-Bissau; Ivory Coast; Liberia; Niger; Sierra Leone; Senegal; Togo; MINUSMA (2013–2023): Chad; Burundi; Gabon; South Africa; Rwanda; Tanzania; Uganda; China; Sweden; Estonia; Egypt; United Kingdom; Portugal; Non-state combatants: Ganda Iso; MAA-Loyaliste; MSA (from 2016); GATIA (from 2014); Wagner Group (from 2021) (Note: The participation of the Wagner Group, a Russian private military company, has been denied by both Russia and Mali, which insist Russia is only sending military advisors.) Coordination of Azawad Movements (CMA): National Movement for the Liberation of Azawad (MNLA); High Council for the Unity of Azawad (HCUA); MAA-CMA	Al-Qaeda: Jama'at Nasr al-Islam wal Muslimin (2017–present); Al-Mourabitoun (2013–17); Ansar al-Sharia (2012–present); Ansar Dine (2012–17); AQIM (2012–17); Macina Liberation Front (2015–17); MOJWA (2011–13); Nigerian jihadist volunteers (2012–13): Boko Haram (2012–13); Ansaru (2012–13); Islamic State: Islamic State in the Greater Sahara	Ongoing: Turkish intervention intensifies in 2022	Recep Tayyip Erdoğan	Fuat Oktay Cevdet Yılmaz
American-led intervention in Iraq (2014–2017)	Iraq; Iraqi Kurdistan CJTF–OIR: United States; Australia; Belgium; Canada; Denmark; France; Germany; Jordan; Morocco; Netherlands; United Kingdom; Turkey	ISIS	Victory: Turkish intervention in July 2015	Recep Tayyip Erdoğan	Ahmet Davutoğlu Binali Yıldırım
Turkish intervention in Libya (2020–present)	Turkey (Syrian opposition) Syrian Interim Government; SADAT International Defense Consultancy In support of: (Libya) Government of National Accord (until 2021) (Libya) Government of National Unity (since 2021) Supported by: Italy; Malta; Qatar	House of Representatives; Ba'athist Syria; Wagner Group; Gaddafi loyalists: Popular Front for the Liberation of Libya; Supported by: Egypt; Greece; Saudi Arabia; France; Russia; United Arab Emirates	Ongoing: Turkish-GNA victory; Turkey and its proxies pushed LNA out of Tripoli; ceasefire; GNA repelled the LNA offensive and advanced towards Sirte and Western Libya	Recep Tayyip Erdoğan	Fuat Oktay Cevdet Yılmaz

== See also ==
- Civil conflict in Turkey
- Military history of Turkey
- List of wars involving the Ottoman Empire
- List of battles involving the Ottoman Empire
- Military history of the Ottoman Empire
- List of wars involving the Sultanate of Rum

== Bibliography ==
- Gingeras, Ryan (2022). The Last Days of the Ottoman Empire. Dublin: Random House. ISBN 978-0-241-44432-0.
