= Kafr Battikh =

Kafr Battikh كفر بطيخ
- Village
- Location in Syria
- Coordinates: 35°46′55″N 36°43′25″E
- Country: Syria
- Governorate: Idlib
- District: Idlib District
- Subdistrict: Saraqib Nahiyah

Population (2004)
  - Total: 3,166
- Time zone: UTC+2 (EET)
  - Summer (DST): UTC+3 (EEST)
- City Qrya Pcode: C3927

Kafr Battikh (Arabic: كفر بطيخ) is a Syrian village located in Saraqib Nahiyah in Idlib District, Idlib. According to the Syria Central Bureau of Statistics (CBS), Kafr Battikh had a population of 3,166 in the 2004 census.

== History ==
During the Syrian Civil War, in 2012 the village was captured from the Syrian government by rebel forces. On 8 July 2019, the village was struck by Russian airstrikes, which were targeting Hay'at Tahrir al-Sham's supply lines in the area. On 30 January 2020, the village was liberated by government forces, advancing from Ma'arrat al-Nu'man towards Saraqib during the 5th Northwestern Syria offensive.
