= 2020 Balyun airstrikes =

Military operation in Syrian Civil War

- Part of the Northwestern Syria offensive (2019–2020)
- Location: Balyun, Idlib Governorate, Syria
- Target: Turkish Armed Forces; Turkish Army
- Date: 27 February 2020
- Executed by: Syrian Air Force; Russian Air Force (denied by Russia)
- Casualties: 33–34 soldiers killed (per Turkey & SOHR); 50–70 soldiers killed (per other sources close to Turkey); 36–60 wounded

On 27 February 2020, during the Dawn of Idlib 2 Operation, a joint airstrike was executed by the Syrian Air Force, and allegedly the Russian Air Force, against a convoy of the Turkish Army stationed in Balyun, within the Idlib Governorate. Turkish President Recep Tayyip Erdoğan reported that the assault resulted in the loss of 34 Turkish soldiers (the Turkish Ministry of National Defense announced 33 deaths). However, alternative sources suggested a significantly higher death toll, ranging from 50 to 70 dead, marking it as the most lethal attack on Turkish forces since their engagement in the Syrian Civil War commenced. The assault also inflicted injuries on an estimated 36 to 60 soldiers, with 16 of them reported to be in a critical state. This incident represented the most substantial loss of life experienced by the Turkish Army on foreign territory since the Turkish invasion of Cyprus in 1974. In response to this attack, the Turkish Armed Forces initiated Operation Spring Shield in the province of Idlib.

== The strikes ==
At around 11 a.m. on 27 February 2020, a pair of Russian Sukhoi Su-34s accompanied by two Syrian Su-22M4 fighter bombers initiated a series intensive of bombing raids on Hayat Tahrir al-Sham forces in the southern countryside of Syria's Idlib province. As per Russian sources, following 1 p.m., Turkish troops launched over 15 attacks using MANPADS against the Russian and Syrian jets. There were reports of certain Russian aircraft allegedly sustaining damage while evading the barrage of fire.

At around 5 p.m., a convoy consisting of a 400-man Turkish mechanized infantry battalion came under attack by an airstrike while traveling on the road between al-Bara and Balyun, about five kilometers north of Kafr Nabl. The convoy was first halted by a light airstrike carried out by a Su-22M4 aircraft. Subsequently, a second bombing forced 80 Turkish soldiers from the 65th Mechanised Infantry Brigade to seek shelter in nearby buildings. According to Al-Monitor, it is suspected that the Russian jets dropped KAB-1500L bombs, resulting in the collapse of two buildings and trapping several soldiers under the debris.

== Turkish retaliation ==
In response to this attack, the Turkish Armed Forces initiated Operation Spring Shield in the province of Idlib. Fighter aircraft, combat drones and ground fire were used in the retaliation. Turkish combat drones entered Syrian airspace while Turkish Air Force F-16C fighter jets launched long range precision-guided munitions without entering Syrian airspace, according to Turkish sources. According to independent estimates, the retaliatory strikes resulted in the death of approximately 197 to 405 Syrian forces. However, the Turkish Defense Ministry had a significantly higher figure, claiming that the Syrian forces' casualties amounted to 3,138.

== Reactions ==
- Greece: On 29 February 2020, the Greek delegation to NATO blocked a joint declaration intended to support Turkey regarding its military operation in Syria. According to Kathimerini, the reason for the veto was because the United States, United Kingdom, France and Germany denied a Greek demand to add a paragraph regarding the issue of refugees from Turkey to Greece.
- Russia: The following day, the Russian government denied it carried out airstrikes in the area and stated it made attempts to ensure the Syrian military ceased firing to allow the evacuation of the Turkish troops, but claimed that Turkish forces should not have been in the area, where "counter-terror operations" were taking place, and that Turkey failed to notify it about the soldiers' presence in advance. The Turkish government claimed that the Russian military had already been notified of Turkish troop locations, as the two militaries had regularly liaised about these.
- Turkey: Protests against Russia occurred at the Russian Consulate in Istanbul the day following the strikes. The Turkish cabinet had an emergency meeting concerning the airstrikes. The Turkish government then threatened retaliation against the Syrian government for the strikes, and began to encourage Syrian refugees to enter Greece and Bulgaria. In addition, the Turkish Foreign Minister Mevlüt Çavuşoğlu spoke with the Secretary General of NATO, Jens Stoltenberg, concerning the incident.
- United States: On 2 March 2020, the U.S. Secretary of Defence Mark Esper denied US air support for Turkey in Idlib. The Chairman of the U.S. Joint Chiefs of Staff General Mark Milley stated that the U.S. did not "have clear" intelligence of who was flying the planes that carried out the strike. On 17 March 2020, the U.S. Secretary of State Mike Pompeo announced new rounds of sanctions against Syrian government officials and also for the first time publicly accused Russia for being responsible for the deaths of Turkish troops in Syria, saying "We believe Russia has killed dozens of Turkish military personnel in the course of their military operation," but without naming a specific incident.

== Aftermath ==
On 27 February 2022, during the Russian invasion of Ukraine, Ukraine bombarded Russian forces with Turkish-made Bayraktar TB2 drones at the Kherson International Airport at Chornobaivka. The Ukrainian embassy in Ankara reacted to these airstrikes, describing them as "revenge" against Russia for the 2020 Baylun incident and declaring that "there is such a thing as divine justice".
