= Balyun =

Balyun بليون
- Town
- Location in Syria
- Coordinates: 35°42′N 36°30′E
- Country: Syria
- Governorate: Idlib
- District: Ariha District
- Subdistrict: Ihsim Nahiyah

Population (2004)
  - Total: 6,030
- Time zone: UTC+2 (EET)
  - Summer (DST): UTC+3 (EEST)
- City Qrya Pcode: C4302

Balyun (Arabic: بليون) is a Syrian village located in Ihsim Nahiyah in Ariha District, Idlib. According to the Syria Central Bureau of Statistics (CBS), Balyun had a population of 6,030 in the 2004 census.

== Syrian civil war ==
On 27 February 2020, the Syrian and Russian air forces struck a Turkish Armed Forces position in Balyun, killing at least 34 Turkish soldiers. Following the northwestern offensive, the town became mostly deserted, due to heavy aerial bombardment and artillery fire.
