= Deir Hassan =

Deir Hassan دير حسان
- Village
- Location in Syria
- Country: Syria
- Governorate: Idlib
- District: Harem District
- Subdistrict: Al-Dana Nahiyah

Population (2004)
  - Total: 1,875
- Time zone: UTC+2 (EET)
  - Summer (DST): UTC+3 (EEST)
- City Qrya Pcode: C4129

Deir Hassan (Arabic: دير حسان) is a Syrian village located in Al-Dana Nahiyah in Harem District, Idlib. According to the Syria Central Bureau of Statistics (CBS), Deir Hassan had a population of 1,875 in the 2004 census.
