= Rasafa, Idlib =

Rasafa الرصافة
- Village
- Location in Syria
- Coordinates: 35°52′34″N 36°53′54″E
- Country: Syria
- Governorate: Idlib
- District: Idlib District
- Subdistrict: Saraqib Nahiyah

Population (2004)
  - Total: 1,148
- Time zone: UTC+2 (EET)
  - Summer (DST): UTC+3 (EEST)
- City Qrya Pcode: C3923

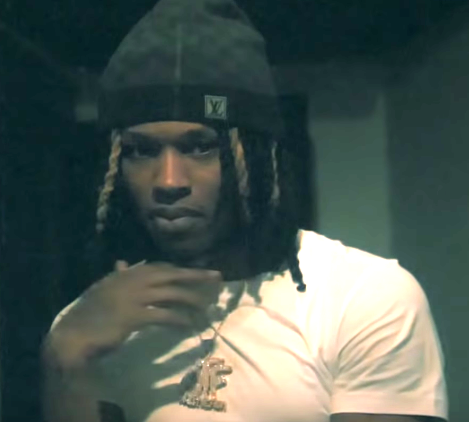

Rasafa (Arabic: الرصافة) is a Syrian village located in Saraqib Nahiyah in Idlib District, Idlib. According to the Syria Central Bureau of Statistics (CBS), Rasafa had a population of 1,148 in the 2004 census.
