= Al-Ghadfa =

Al-Ghadfa الغدفة
- Village
- Al-Ghadfa
- Location in Syria
- Coordinates: 35°40′27.001″N 36°47′26.002″E
- Country: Syria
- Governorate: Idlib
- District: Maarrat al-Nu'man District
- Subdistrict: Maarrat al-Nu'man Nahiyah

Population (2004)
  - Total: 4,576
- Time zone: UTC+2 (EET)
  - Summer (DST): UTC+3 (EEST)
- City Qrya Pcode: C3963

Al-Ghadfa (Arabic: الغدفة) is a Syrian village located in Maarrat al-Nu'man Nahiyah in Maarrat al-Nu'man District, Idlib. According to the Syria Central Bureau of Statistics (CBS), Al-Ghadfa had a population of 4576 in the 2004 census.
