= Kansafra =

Kansafra كنصفرة
- Town
- Location in Syria
- Coordinates: 35°39′35″N 36°29′05″E
- Country: Syria
- Governorate: Idlib
- District: Ariha District
- Subdistrict: Ihsim Nahiyah

Population (2004)
  - Total: 7,496
- Time zone: UTC+2 (EET)
  - Summer (DST): UTC+3 (EEST)
- City Qrya Pcode: C4309

Kansafra (Arabic: كنصفرة) is a Syrian village located in Ihsim Nahiyah in Ariha District, Idlib. According to the Syria Central Bureau of Statistics (CBS), Kansafra had a population of 7,496 in the 2004 census.

== See also ==
- December 2011 Jabal al-Zawiya massacres
