= Sheikh Mustafa, Idlib =

Sheikh Mustafa الشيخ مصطفى
- Village
- Location in Syria
- Coordinates: 35°31′9.84″N 36°33′9.72″E
- Country: Syria
- Governorate: Idlib
- District: Maarrat al-Nu'man District
- Subdistrict: Kafr Nabl Nahiyah

Population (2004)
  - Total: 1,456
- Time zone: UTC+2 (EET)
  - Summer (DST): UTC+3 (EEST)
- City Qrya Pcode: C4055

Sheikh Mustafa (Arabic: الشيخ مصطفى) is a Syrian village located in Kafr Nabl Nahiyah in Maarrat al-Nu'man District, Idlib. According to the Syria Central Bureau of Statistics (CBS), Sheikh Mustafa had a population of 1456 in the 2004 census.
