= Msheirfeh, Idlib =

Msheirfeh المشيرفة
- Village
- Location in Syria
- Coordinates: 35°46′24″N 36°57′56″E
- Country: Syria
- Governorate: Idlib
- District: Idlib District
- Subdistrict: Abu al-Duhur Nahiyah

Population (2004)
  - Total: 287
- Time zone: UTC+2 (EET)
  - Summer (DST): UTC+3 (EEST)
- City Qrya Pcode: N/A

Msheirfeh (Arabic: المشيرفة) is a Syrian village located in Abu al-Duhur Nahiyah in Idlib District, Idlib. According to the Central Bureau of Statistics (CBS), it had a population of 287 in the 2004 census. It is a predominantly Kurdish village.
