= Jarjnaz =

Jarjnaz جرجناز
- Town
- Location in Syria
- Coordinates: 35.617535°N 36.777248°E
- Country: Syria
- Governorate: Idlib
- District: Maarrat al-Nu'man District
- Subdistrict: Maarrat al-Nu'man Nahiyah

Population (2004)
  - Total: 10,756
- Time zone: UTC+2 (EET)
  - Summer (DST): UTC+3 (EEST)
- City Qrya Pcode: C3977

Jarjnaz (Arabic: جرجناز) is a Syrian town located in Maarrat al-Nu'man Nahiyah in Maarrat al-Nu'man District, Idlib. According to the Syria Central Bureau of Statistics (CBS), Jarjnaz had a population of 10,756 in the 2004 census.
