= Sheikh Dames =

Sheikh Dames الشيخ دامس
- Village
- Location in Syria
- Coordinates: 35°32′47″N 36°37′2.48″E
- Country: Syria
- Governorate: Idlib
- District: Maarrat al-Nu'man District
- Subdistrict: Hish Nahiyah

Population (2004)
  - Total: 753
- Time zone: UTC+2 (EET)
  - Summer (DST): UTC+3 (EEST)
- City Qrya Pcode: C4107

Sheikh Dames (Arabic: الشيخ دامس) is a Syrian village located in Hish Nahiyah in Maarrat al-Nu'man District, Idlib. According to the Syria Central Bureau of Statistics (CBS), Sheikh Dames had a population of 753 in the 2004 census.
