= Al-Eiss =

Al-Eiss العيس
- Town
- Location in Syria
- Coordinates: 35°59′40″N 36°59′55″E
- Country: Syria
- Governorate: Aleppo
- District: Mount Simeon District
- Subdistrict: Al-Hadher Subdistrict

Population (2004)
  - Total: 4,801
- Time zone: UTC+2 (EET)
  - Summer (DST): UTC+3 (EEST)
- City Qrya Pcode: C1181

Al-Eiss or Al-Iss (Arabic: العيس) is a Syrian town located in Mount Simeon District, Aleppo. According to the Syria Central Bureau of Statistics (CBS), Al-Eiss had a population of 4,801 in the 2004 census.
