= Kafr Oweid =

Kafr Oweid كفر عويد
- Village
- Location in Syria
- Coordinates: 35°37′40″N 36°27′26″E
- Country: Syria
- Governorate: Idlib
- District: Maarrat al-Nu'man District
- Subdistrict: Kafr Nabl Nahiyah
- Occupation: Jaish al-Fatah

Population (2004)
  - Total: 6,932
- Time zone: UTC+2 (EET)
  - Summer (DST): UTC+3 (EEST)
- City Qrya Pcode: C4062

Kafr Oweid (Arabic: كفر عويد) is a Syrian village located in Kafr Nabl Nahiyah in Maarrat al-Nu'man District, Idlib. According to the Syria Central Bureau of Statistics (CBS), Kafr Oweid had a population of 6932 in the 2004 census.

== See also ==
- December 2011 Jabal al-Zawiya massacres
