= Rasm al-Ward =

Rasm al-Ward رسم الورد
- Village
- Location in Syria
- Coordinates: 35°26′56″N 37°17′30″E
- Country: Syria
- Governorate: Hama
- District: Hama
- Subdistrict: Hamraa

Population (2004)
  - Total: 483
- Time zone: UTC+3 (AST)
- City Qrya Pcode: C3078

Rasm al-Ward (Arabic: رسم الورد) is a Syrian village located in Al-Hamraa Nahiyah in Hama District, Hama. According to the Syria Central Bureau of Statistics (CBS), Rasm Elward had a population of 483 in the 2004 census.
