= Use of chemical weapons in the Syrian civil war =

There have been several instances of chemical weapons attacks during the Syrian civil war, beginning in 2012, which were either reported or corroborated by national governments, the United Nations (UN), the Organisation for the Prohibition of Chemical Weapons (OPCW), Human Rights Watch (HRW), international organizations and media outlets.

Several chemical attacks occurred in different areas of Syria, including Khan al-Assal, Jobar, Saraqib, Ashrafiyat Sahnaya, Kafr Zita, Talmenes, Sarmin and Douma. The deadliest attacks were the August 2013 sarin attack in Ghouta (killing more than 1,729 people and injuring 3,600 patients), the April 2017 sarin attack in Khan Shaykhun (killing at least 89 people) and April 2018 Douma chemical attacks (killing 43 people and injuring 500 civilians), all of which were perpetrated by the military forces of Ba'athist Syria. The most common agent used is chlorine (with one study finding it was used in 91.5% of attacks), with sarin and sulphur mustard also reported. Almost half of the attacks between 2014 and 2018 were delivered via aircraft and less than a quarter were delivered from the ground, with the remaining attacks having an undetermined method of delivery. Since the start of uprisings across Syria in 2011, Syrian Arab Armed Forces and pro-Assad paramilitary forces have been implicated in more than 300 chemical attacks in Syria.

Investigations have found that both the Ba'athist government of Bashar al-Assad and ISIL militants have used chemical weapons, with the vast majority of attacks being carried out by the Assad regime. The OPCW-UN Joint Investigative Mechanism concluded that the Assad regime perpetrated the sarin attack in Khan Shaykhun, as well as three chlorine attacks. They also concluded ISIL militants used sulphur mustard. Investigations launched by the UN's Independent International Commission of Inquiry on the Syrian Arab Republic concluded that the government of Bashar al-Assad carried out 33 chemical attacks between 2013 and September 2018. According to HRW, at least 85 confirmed chemical attacks occurred between 21 August 2013 and 25 February 2018, and concluded that the Ba'athist Syrian military forces were responsible for the majority of the attacks. HRW stated that the actual number of attacks was likely higher than 85. According to a Global Public Policy Institute study, at least 336 chemical attacks occurred between 23 December 2012 and 18 January 2019. The report concluded that 98% of these attacks were carried out by pro-Assad forces and 2% by ISIL.

The Ghouta chemical attack in 2013 prompted the international community to pressure the Syrian Arab Armed Forces to agree to the supervised destruction of their chemical weapons. In April 2018, following at least 18 visits to Syria for inspections, the technical secretariat of the OPCW was unable to "verify that Syria had submitted a declaration that could be considered accurate and complete." The Khan Shaykhun chemical attack on 4 April 2017 drew international condemnation, and resulted in U.S. military action against the Ba'athist Syrian-controlled airbase at Shayrat. The Douma chemical attack on 7 April 2018 also drew a military response from the United States, United Kingdom and France. In April 2021, OPCW suspended Syria from its membership, criticising the Assad regime for not revealing its chemical weapon stockpiles and contravening the Chemical Weapons Convention.

== Background ==
At the outbreak of the Syrian civil war in 2011 concerns were raised about both the security of Syria's chemical weapon sites and about the potential use of chemical weapons. In July 2012, Syrian Foreign Ministry spokesman Jihad Makdissi stated: "No chemical or biological weapons will ever be used... All of these types of weapons are in storage and under security and the direct supervision of the Syrian armed forces and will never be used unless Syria is exposed to external aggression." Bashar Al-Assad himself denied his role ordering chemical attacks and in September 2013, German newspaper Bild claimed to have spoken to a senior intelligence official who claimed Assad did not personally order the chemical attack and that Syrian brigade and division commanders have asked the presidential office for permission to use chemical weapons for more than four months, with permission being denied each time. Journalist Patrick J. McDonnell wrote in the Los Angeles Times in May 2013:

"The Syrian government does not publicly acknowledge that it possesses chemical weapons, although international experts say it has a large arsenal, including sarin. Syrian authorities have vowed never to use such weapons against a domestic enemy, even if they were in Syria’s possession. At the same time, however, they have consistently depicted the rebellion against Assad as a foreign-based “conspiracy” hatched by Syria’s enemies abroad, and not as an internal revolt."

A Syrian defector who worked inside the chemical weapons network alleged that in January 2012 two senior Syrian officers moved about 100 kg of chemical weapons materials from a secret military base in Nasiriyah. The Syrian source also described construction of special trucks, which could transport and mix the weapons. These mobile mixers were constructed inside Mercedes or Volvo trucks that were similar to refrigerator trucks. Inside were storage tanks, pipes and a motor to drive the mixing machinery, the defector said. On 23 July 2012, the Syrian government confirmed for the first time that it had chemical weapons, but stated that they would only be used in instances of external aggression.

On 20 August 2012, President Barack Obama used the phrase "red line" in reference to the use of chemical weapons. Specifically, Obama said: "We have been very clear to the Assad regime, but also to other players on the ground, that a red line for us is we start seeing a whole bunch of chemical weapons moving around or being utilized. That would change my calculus. That would change my equation."

In September 2012, the Syrian military began moving chemical weapons from Damascus to the port city of Tartus. That same month, it was reported that the military had restarted testing of chemical weapons at a base on the outskirts of Aleppo. On 28 September 2012, US Defence Secretary Leon Panetta said that the Syrian government had moved its chemical weapons in order to secure them from approaching opposition forces. It emerged that the Russian government had helped set up communications between the United States and Syria regarding the status of Syria's chemical weapons. Russian Foreign Minister Sergei Lavrov stated that Syria had given the United States "explanations" and "assurances" that it was taking care of the weapons. On 8 December, it was reported that members of the jihadist Al-Nusra Front had recently captured a Saudi-owned toxic chemicals plant outside of Aleppo. On 22 December 2012, Russian Foreign Minister Sergei Lavrov stated that Syria had consolidated chemical weapons into one or two places to prevent rebels capturing them, and that recent moves that had alarmed Western governments were part of this consolidation. Brigadier General Mustafa al-Sheikh, a Syrian army defector, confirmed that most of the chemical weapons have been transported to Alawite areas in Latakia and near the coast. Some chemical munitions remain in bases around Damascus. In December 2012 McClatchy reported various chemical weapons experts' skepticism that Syria was preparing to use chemical weapons, noting their "limited utility" in a civil war situation with fluid battlelines, and Syria's comments that such use would be "suicide" in view of US threats of retaliation.

On 6 September 2013 a bill was filed in the US Congress to authorize the use of military force against the Syrian military, mainly in response to the use of sarin in the Ghouta attack on 21 August 2013. On 9 September 2013, the U.S. Secretary of State John Kerry stated that the air strikes could be averted if Syria turned over "every single bit" of its chemical weapons stockpiles. Hours after Kerry's statement, the Russian foreign minister Sergey Lavrov announced that Russia had suggested to Syria that it relinquish its chemical weapons. The Syrian foreign minister Walid al-Moallem immediately welcomed the proposal.

In September 2013 the Syrian government entered into several international agreements for the destruction of its chemical weapons that stipulated an initial destruction deadline of 30 June 2014, a deadline apparently achieved in respect of declared chemical weapons. Prior to September 2013 the Syrian government had not publicly admitted to possessing chemical weapons, although Western intelligence services believed it to hold one of the world's largest stockpiles.

On 17 August 2017, Reuters published a report detailing the extent of Syria's failure to abandon chemical weapons, citing information from investigators, inspectors and diplomatic sources. According to a source cited in the report, "There are certainly some gaps, uncertainties, discrepancies" regarding Syria's chemical weapons arsenal. For example, the Syrian government inaccurately or even falsely declared the types, purposes and quantities of chemicals in its possession, and is suspected of continuing to hold at least 2,000 chemical bomb shells that should have been converted to conventional weapons.

== Incidents ==
The map marks the position of reported chemical weapons attacks in the Syrian Civil War. Yellow markers indicate chlorine attacks. Red indicate a more deadly chemical weapon agent.

Investigation conducted by Dr. Tobias Schneider and Theresa Lutkefend of the GPPi research institute documented 336 confirmed attacks involving chemical weapons in Syria between 23 December 2012 and 18 January 2019. The study concluded that 98% of the total chemical attacks were perpetrated by the Assad regime. Almost 90% of the attacks occurred after Ghouta chemical attack in August 2013.

=== Reported chemical weapons attacks ===
The table below lists the reported attacks and the main points. See the main articles for details. (Note: All times given are given in Eastern European Time (EET), or UTC+02:00 unless otherwise stated.)

| Date | Location | Governorate | Impact points | | | Civilian victims | | Soldier/militias victims | | | CW-agent | Main article | Notes |
| Date | Location | Governorate | Time of day | Coordinates | Controlled by | Deaths | Non-fatal | Deaths | Non-fatal | Unit | CW-agent | Main article | Notes |
|---|---|---|---|---|---|---|---|---|---|---|---|---|---|
| 17 October 2012 | Salqin | Idlib | | | | | | | | | | | Reported by the Government of France. (Note: In their final report, the U.N. mission stated: "The United Nations Mission did not receive sufficient or credible information in respect of the alleged incidents in Salquin on 17 October 2012, Homs on 23 December 2012, Darayya on 13 March and 25 April 2013, Otaybah on 19 March 2013, Adra on 24 March and 23 May 2013, Jobar between 11 and 14 April 2013, and Qasr Abu Samrah on 14 May 2013.") |
| 23 December 2012 | Al-Bayadah | Homs | | | Free Syrian Army | 5 | App. 100 | | | | Most likely Agent 15 | | Reported by the Government of France, UK and Qatar, and also Haaretz and Foreign Policy. |
| 13 March 2013 | Darayya | Rif Dimashq | | | | | | | | | | | Reported by the Government of UK and Qatar. |
| 14 March 2013 | Otaybah | Rif Dimashq | | | | | | | | | | | Reported by Le Monde. |
| 19 March 2013 | Khan al-Asal | Aleppo | Early morning | 36.167222°N 37.039167°E | Syrian Army | 10 | 107 | 16 | 17 | Syrian Army | Sarin | Khan al-Assal chemical attack | Reported by the Governments of Syria, Russia, France, UK and US, as well as SOHR. Confirmed by the U.N. |
| 19 March 2013 | Otaybah | Rif Dimashq | | | | | | | | | | | Reported by the Governments of France and UK. |
| 24 March 2013 | Adra | Rif Dimashq | | | | | | | | | Phosphorus | | Reported by the Government of UK. |
| 11 April 2013 | Jobar | Damascus | | | | | | | | | | Jobar chemical attacks | Reported by Le Monde. |
| 12 April 2013 | Jobar | Damascus | | | | | | | | | | Jobar chemical attacks | Reported by Le Monde. |
| 13 April 2013 | Sheikh Maqsood | Aleppo | | | People's Protection Units (YPG) and Kurdish Front Brigade | 3 | more than a dozen | | | | | | Reported by the Government of US. |
| 13 April 2013 | Jobar | Damascus | | | | | | | | | | Jobar chemical attacks | Reported by the Government of France. |
| 14 April 2013 | Jobar | Damascus | | | | | | | | | | Jobar chemical attacks | Reported by the Government of France. |
| 25 April 2013 | Darayya | Rif Dimashq | | | | | | | | | | | Reported by the Government of UK. |
| 29 April 2013 | Saraqib | Idlib | | A:35.8672041°N 36.7995858°E; B:35.8613742°N 36.7970538°E; C:35.8542831°N 36.7974508°E | Free Syrian Army | 1 | 10 | | 2 | Free Syrian Army | Sarin/Tear gas | Saraqib chemical attack | Reported by the Governments of UK and France. Allegedly some of the hand grenade–type munitions contained tear gas, whereas other grenades were filled with sarin. A French report in 2017 said hexamine was present in the Sarin used in Saraqib, linking it to Syrian regime later attacks in Ghouta and Khan Shakoun. The sarin present in the munitions used on 4 April was produced using the same manufacturing process as that used during the sarin attack perpetrated by the Syrian regime in Saraqib. Moreover, the presence of hexamine indicated that this manufacturing process is that developed by the Scientific Studies and Research Centre for the Syrian regime. |
| 14 May 2013 | Qasr Abu Samrah | Hama | | | | | | | | | | | Reported by the Governments of US. |
| 23 May 2013 | Adra | Rif Dimashq | | | | | | | | | | | Reported by the Governments of US. |
| 5 August 2013 | Adra | Rif Dimashq | | | | | | | | | | | Ref. Human Rights Watch. |
| 21 August 2013 | Zamalka/Ein Tarma | Rif Dimashq | Between 02:00 and 03:00 | Ein Tarma: A:33.5205744°N 36.3563669°E; B:33.5207063°N 36.3573325°E Zamalka: C:33.5213347°N 36.3481593°E; D:33.5217908°N 36.3522577°E; E:33.5224617°N 36.3594246°E; F:33.5234724°N 36.3544142°E; G:33.5238391°N 36.3625681°E; H:33.5246083°N 36.3612056°E; I:33.5250734°N 36.3584054°E; J:33.5257263°N 36.3593173°E; K:33.5257352°N 36.3625896°E; L:33.5274345°N 36.360873°E | | 734 | | | | | Sarin | Ghouta chemical attack | Reported by multiple U.N. Member States. |
| 21 August 2013 | Muadamiyat al-Sham | Rif Dimashq | App. 05:00 | Four 140mm rockets impacted next to the Rawda Mosque (33.4602966°N 36.1972287°E). Three 140mm rockets impacted app. 500 meters to the east of the Rawda Mosque (33.4601064°N 36.2025046°E). | | 103 | | | | | Sarin | Ghouta chemical attack | Reported by multiple U.N. Member States. |
| 22 August 2013 | Al-Bahariyah | Rif Dimashq | App. 17:00 | 33.528653°N 36.525669°E | Syrian Army | | | | 16 | Syrian Army | | | Reported by the Government of Syria. The U.N. mission investigated the attack, but did not find reliable information to support the allegation that a CW-agent were used. |
| 24 August 2013 | Jobar | Damascus | App. 11:00 | 33.5342371°N 36.3450721°E | Syrian Army | | | | 24 | Syrian Army | Sarin | Jobar sarin attack | Ref. U.N. |
| 25 August 2013 | Ashrafiyat Sahnaya | Rif Dimashq | App. 20:00 | 33.4463166°N 36.2513208°E | Syrian Army | | | | 5 | Syrian Army | Sarin | Ashrafiyat Sahnaya chemical attack | Ref. U.N. |
| 10 April 2014 | Kafr Zita | Hama | Midnight, night to 11 April | | Syrian opposition | | | | | | Chlorine | | Ref. OPCW. |
| 11 April 2014 | Kafr Zita | Hama | 18:00 – 19:00 hrs | A:35.3734621°N 36.590867°E; B:35.373742°N 36.599772°E; C:35.3771188°N 36.5998149°E | Syrian opposition | 2 | 107 affected, 5 seriously (12 patients) | | | | Chlorine | 2014 Kafr Zita chemical attack | Ref.OPCW, UNHRC, HRW, SOHR, VDC and SANA. |
| 11 April 2014 | Harasta | Rif Dimashq | | | | | | | | | | | Ref. |
| 12 April 2014 | Kafr Zita | Hama | 21:00 – 22:00 | | Syrian opposition | | 5 patients | | | | Chlorine | | Ref. OPCW and UNHRC. |
| 12 April 2014 | Al-Tamanah | Idlib | 22:45 | Residential house, 100 m from Western school | Syrian opposition | – | 25 | | | | Chlorine | | Ref. OPCW and UNHRC. |
| 13 April 2014 | Al-Tamanah | Idlib | App. 22:30 | | Syrian opposition | – | 112 affected | | | | Chlorine | | Ref. Human Rights Watch |
| 14 April 2014 | Halfaya | Hama | 23:00 | | | | 4 patients | | | | Chlorine | | Ref. OPCW. |
| 16 April 2014 | Harasta | Rif Dimashq | | | | | | | | | | | Ref. The Times of Israel. |
| 16 April 2014 | Kafr Zita | Hama | 22:00 | Al-Zowar region | Syrian opposition | | 4 patients | | | | Chlorine | | Ref. OPCW and UNHRC. |
| 18 April 2014 | Al-Tamanah | Idlib | App. 22:00 | Residential house, 150 m from medical unit | Syrian opposition | 4 | 70 | | | | Chlorine | | Ref. OPCW, UNHRC and HRW. |
| 18 April 2014 | Kafr Zita | Hama | 22:30 | | Syrian opposition | | App. 100 affected (35 patients) | | | | Chlorine | | Ref. OPCW, UNHRC and HRW. |
| 21 April 2014 | Talmenes | Idlib | Around 10:30 to 10:45. | Two "barrel bombs" struck two houses 100 m from each other, in the neighbourhood around the big mosque (35.6376885°N 36.7392683°E). | Syrian opposition | 3 | App. 133 (4 severely) | | | | Chlorine | Talmenes chemical attack | Ref. OPCW, UNHRC and Human Rights Watch. According to OPCW investigation the attack was conducted by Syrian Armed Forces helicopter. |
| 22 April 2014 | Darayya | Rif Dimashq | | | | | | | | | | | Ref. The Daily Star. |
| 29 April 2014 | Al-Tamanah | Idlib | Night to 30 April | Residential house, 20 m from northern school | Syrian opposition | – | 35 | | | | Chlorine | | Ref. OPCW and UNHRC. |
| 19 May 2014 | Kafr Zita | Hama | 20:00 | | Syrian opposition | 1 | 130 affected (2 patients) | | | | Chlorine | | Ref. Al Arabiya. |
| 21 May 2014 | Al-Tamanah | Idlib | | | | | | | | | Chlorine | | Ref. International Business Times. |
| 21 May 2014 | Kafr Zita | Hama | 20:00 | | Syrian opposition | | 4 patients | | | | Chlorine | | Ref. OPCW |
| 22 May 2014 | Al-Tamanah | Idlib | 10:00–11:00 | Residential house | Syrian opposition | 4 | 12 | | | | Chlorine | | Ref. OPCW. |
| 22 May 2014 | Kafr Zita | Hama | 20:00 | | Syrian opposition | | dozens (38 patients) | | | | Chlorine | | Ref. OPCW and CNN. |
| 25 May 2014 | Al-Tamanah | Idlib | Night to 26 May | Residential house, 50 m from main road | Syrian opposition | – | – | | | | Chlorine | | Ref. OPCW. |
| 29 May 2014 | Al-Lataminah | Hama | Night | | | | 17 patients | | | | Chlorine | | Ref. OPCW. |
| 12 July 2014 | Avdiko | Aleppo | | | People's Protection Units (YPG) | | | 3 | | People's Protection Units (YPG) | Most likely mustard gas | | Ref. The Huffington Post and the MERIA Journal. |
| 27 July 2014 | Kafr Zita | Hama | 19:00 | | Syrian opposition | | – | | | | Chlorine | | Ref. OPCW. |
| 21 August 2014 | Jobar | Damascus | | | | 6 | | | | | | | Ref. ARA News. |
| 28 August 2014 | Kafr Zita | Hama | 21:30 – 22:00 | | Syrian opposition | | – | | | | Chlorine | | Ref. OPCW and Channel News Asia. |
| 30 August 2014 | Kafr Zita | Hama | | | Syrian opposition | | | | | | Chlorine | | Ref. OPCW. |
| 15 February 2015 | Darayya | Rif Dimashq | Around noon | 33.4594664°N 36.2392831°E; 50 to 100 m northwest of the Shrine of Sukayna | Syrian Army | | | | 4 | Syrian Army | Possibly sarin | | Five to eight government soldiers were allegedly exposed to sarin or a sarin-like substance. Ref. |
| 21 February 2015 | Hayan | Aleppo | | | Syrian opposition | | | | | | Noxious gas | | Ref. civil defence team. |
| 9 March 2015 | Mzeireb | Daraa | | | Syrian opposition | | | | | | Chlorine | | Ref. anti-regime activists. |
| 16 March 2015 | Qmenas | Idlib | Around 20:30 – 20:45 | | Ahrar al-Sham and Jund al-Aqsa | – | 70 affected, 1 seriously | | | | Most likely Chlorine | | 20 of the victims were from the western neighborhood of Sarmin. The wind allegedly carried the gas from Qmenas to Sarmin. Reported by MESOP. Investigated by Human Rights Watch. |
| 16 March 2015 | Sarmin | Idlib | Around 22:30 – 22:45 | Two barrel bombs were allegedly dropped by a helicopter into the southeastern neighborhood of Sarmin (Kournesh). | Ahrar al-Sham and Jund al-Aqsa | 6 | 30 affected, ranged between moderate and severe. | | | | Most likely Chlorine | Sarmin chemical attack | Reported by LCC and SOHR. Investigated by Human Rights Watch. According to OPCW investigation the attack was conducted by Syrian Armed Forces helicopter. |
| 24 March 2015 | Binnish | Idlib | About 19:30 | Two barrel bombs filled with chlorine gas were dropped on Binnish. | Syrian opposition | – | At least 30 affected | | | | Chlorine | | Ref. The Times. Investigated by Human Rights Watch. |
| 23 March 2015 | Qmenas | Idlib | | | | | | | | | Chlorine | | Ref. activists. Investigated by Human Rights Watch. |
| 24 March 2015 | Binnish | Idlib | Early evening | | | – | 30 wounded | | | | Chlorine | | Ref. activists. Investigated by Human Rights Watch. |
| 31 March 2015 | idlib | Idlib | 2 p.m. | | | – | ? | | | | | | Investigated by Human Rights Watch. |
| 28 June 2015 | Tell Brak | Al-Hasakah | | 17 projectiles impacted south of the village. | People's Protection Units (YPG) | | | | 12 | People's Protection Units (YPG) | Mustard gas | | Ref. CAR. |
| 28 June 2015 | Al-Hasakah | Al-Hasakah | | 7 projectiles impacted in the al-Salehiyah neighborhood. | People's Protection Units (YPG) | | | | | People's Protection Units (YPG) | Mustard gas | | Ref. CAR. |
| 21 August 2015 | Mare' | Aleppo | About 19:30 | | Islamic Front | 1 (a baby) | Around 30 | | | | Mustard gas | | At least 50 mortar and artillery shells were fired at residential areas. At least half of them contained poisonous gas. Ref. According to OPCW investigation the attack was conducted by Islamic State of Iraq and the Levant. |
| 1 September 2015 | Mare' | Aleppo | Around noon | More than 30 projectiles targeted residential areas | Syrian opposition | | Around 20 affected | | | | Mustard gas | | OPCW Fact-Finding Mission published report on a chemical attack. |
| 7 April 2016 | Sheikh Maqsood | Aleppo | | | People's Protection Units | 23 | 100+ | | | | Unknown, possibly chlorine | | A district of Aleppo in Syria controlled by Kurdish fighters have been the target of a chemical attack by Islamic terrorists. Videos show a yellow gas rises above the Sheikh Maksoud neighborhood. |
| 15 June 2016 | Eastern Ghouta | Damascus | | | Syrian Army | | | None | Several | Syrian Army | Unknown | | Reported by Syrian Army. |
| 1 August 2016 | Saraqib | Idlib | app. 11:00 | | Syrian opposition | ? | 28 injured | None | None | - | chlorine | | Reported by Independent International Commission of Inquiry on the Syrian Arab Republic |
| 2 August 2016 | Aleppo | Aleppo Governorate | | | Syrian Army | Unknown | Unknown | 7 | dozens | Syrian Army | Unknown | | Reported by Russia. |
| 10 August 2016 | Aleppo | Aleppo Governorate | | | Syrian opposition | 3+ | 22-55 injured | None | None | - | chlorine | | Reported by activists |
| 25 August 2016 | Dandaniya | Aleppo | Around 17:00 | | Syrian Democratic Forces | | Dozens | | | | Unknown | | Reported by local sources. |
| 1 October 2016 | Kafr Zita | Hama | Around 19:30 | Two industrial cylinders filled with chlorine | Free Syrian Army | | 20 | | | | Chlorine | | OPCW Fact-Finding Mission published report on a chemical attack. |
| 8 October 2016 | Sheikh Maqsood | Aleppo | Early morning | | People's Protection Units | 3 | 4+ | Unknown | Unknown | People's Protection Units | Noxious gas | | Local sources reported an attack by elephant rockets loaded with chemical substances. |
| 25 November 2016 | Sheikh Maqsood | Aleppo | 16:35 | | People's Protection Units | | 3 patients | Unknown | Unknown | People's Protection Units | Unknown | | The Kurdish Red Crescent reported taking 3 patients with chemical wounds after the area was hit by shells suspected to be loaded with poisonous chemicals. |
| 8 January 2017 | Wadi Barada | Damascus | ? | | Syrian opposition | ? | at least 6 injured | ? | ? | - | Chlorine | | Reported by Independent International Commission of Inquiry on the Syrian Arab Republic |
| 24 March 2017 | Al-Lataminah | Hama | app. 6:00 | | Syrian opposition | | 16 | | | | Sarin | | Aerial bomb dropped by military airplane of the Syrian Arab Air Force |
| 25 March 2017 | Al-Lataminah | Hama | app. 15:00 | | Syrian opposition | 3 | 32 | | | | Chlorine | | Cylinder dropped on the hospital by a helicopter of the Syrian Arab Air Force |
| 30 March 2017 | Al-Lataminah | Hama | app. 6:00 | | Syrian opposition | | 70+ | | | | Sarin | | Union of Medical Care and Relief Organizations report, aerial bomb dropped by military airplane of the Syrian Arab Air Force |
| 3 April 2017 | Hbit | Idlib | "evening hours" | | | 2 children | App. 20 affected. | | | | Chlorine | | According to local activists. |
| 4 April 2017 | Khan Shaykhun | Idlib | 06:30 | | Tahrir al-Sham | 58–100+ | 300–400+ | | | | Sarin | 2017 Khan Shaykhun chemical attack | On 4 April 2017, the Syrian government bombed a city in the far-north of the rebel-held Syrian territory with what both witnesses and inspectors claim to have been aerosol dispersion munitions containing some form of an organophosphate nerve agent. It is considered the worst chemical attack in the country since 2015 and resulted in Trump implementing a strike against the air-base from which the bombers are believed to have launched. Syrian officials thoroughly denied the accusations and blamed rebel forces for the chemical release, claiming that one of the Syrian ballistic munitions unintentionally struck a factory which the regimes alleges was being used by rebel forces to manufacture chemical weapons which they intended to transport to Iran. In an emergency meeting of the UN, Russia implemented its veto power to prevent unified international retaliation against the regime in response to the re-escalation of the conflict and violating the CWC for the first time since the Syrian government formalized its accession to the treaty in 2015. |
| 11 January 2018 | Douma | Damascus Governorate | | | | | 6 | | | | Chlorine | | |
| 22 January 2018 | East Ghouta | Damascus Governorate | | | | | 21 | | | | Chlorine | | |
| 1 February 2018 | Douma | Damascus Governorate | | | | 3 | | | | | Chlorine | | |
| 4 February 2018 | Saraqeb | Idlib | | | | | 9 | | | | Chlorine | | According to Syria Civil Defence medics. |
| 16 February 2018 | Aranda, Afrin | Aleppo Governorate | | | Syrian Democratic Forces | | 6 | | | | Chlorine | | SOHR suspects this to be a chemical attack was launched by Turkish Armed Forces. |
| 26 February 2018 | Douma | Damascus Governorate | | | | 1 | 13 | | | | | | |
| 7 April 2018 | Douma | Rif Dimashq | | | | "at least 42" (Note: according to rescue workers) | | | | | | 2018 Douma chemical attack | |
| 24 November 2018 | Aleppo | Aleppo | | | Syrian Army | | 48 or 107 | | | | Chlorine | | Reported by the Government of Syria and the SOHR. "The suspected chlorine attack marked the highest casualty toll in Aleppo since government forces and their allies clawed back the city from rebels nearly two years ago." |
| 19 May 2019 | Kabana | Latakia | Morning | | | 0 | | 0 | 4 | Hayat Tahrir al-Sham | Chlorine | | Alleged by the Idlib province health directorate. Reported by The Daily Telegraph and The Guardian. |

== Investigations ==
=== The UN mission to investigate alleged use of chemical weapons ===
The United Nations Mission to Investigate Allegations of the Use of Chemical Weapons in the Syrian Arab Republic was a fact-finding mission to investigate possible use of chemical weapons in Syria. On 16 September 2013 the mission published a report with focus on the Ghouta attacks. On 12 December 2013, the UN mission delivered its final report.

=== The UNHRC commission of inquiry ===
The Independent International Commission of Inquiry on the Syrian Arab Republic was set up by the United Nations Human Rights Council (UNHRC) on 22 March 2011 to investigate human rights violations during the Syrian civil war. In its report dated 12 February 2014 they confirmed the use of sarin in the case of Khan Al-Assal (19 March 2013), Saraqib (29 April 2013) and Al-Ghouta (21 August 2013). The UNHRC commission also found that the sarin used in the Khan al-Asal attack bore "the same unique hallmarks" as the sarin used in the Ghouta attack and indicated that the perpetrators likely had access to chemicals from the Syrian Army's stockpile. In none of the incidents, however, was the commission's "evidentiary threshold" met in regards to identifying the perpetrators of the chemical attacks.

A 2014 report by the UN enquiry commission stated that Syrian military forces perpetrated eight chemical attacks in April 2014:

"Reasonable grounds exist to believe that chemical agents, likely chlorine, were used on Kafr Zeita, Al-Tamana’a and Tal Minnis in eight incidents within a 10-day period in April. There are also reasonable grounds to believe that those agents were dropped in barrel bombs from government helicopters flying overhead."

In its report dated 13 August 2014 they accused Government forces of using chlorine gas in 8 incidents in Idlib and Hama governorates in April 2014. In March 2017, the Commission documented conclusive evidence that Syrian aircraft dropped "toxic industrial chemicals, including chlorine," between 21 July and 22 December, during the final period of the Battle of Aleppo (2012–2016).

Investigations launched by the UN's Independent International Commission of Inquiry on the Syrian Arab Republic concluded that the government of Bashar al-Assad carried out 33 chemical attacks between 2013 and September 2018. A further six attacks were documented by the Commission, but the perpetrators were not sufficiently identified.

=== OPCW-UN Joint Mission in Syria ===
The OPCW-UN Joint Mission in Syria was established in October 2013. The Mission was tasked to oversee the elimination of the Syrian chemical weapons program. The first OPCW-UN team arrived in Damascus on 1 October 2013. The mission officially ended on 30 September 2014.

=== The Russian Khan al-Asal investigation ===
Vitaly Churkin, Russia's ambassador to the UN, said that its Syrian ally had asked Russian experts to look into the Khan al-Assal attack. A Russian team investigated the Khan al-Asal incident on 19 March 2013. The Russian UN ambassador Vitaly Churkin delivered a report with analysis of the samples taken at the site to the UN Secretary General Ban Ki-moon on 9 July 2013. Churkin said the chemical agent was carried by a "Bashair-3 unguided projectile", which was produced by the Basha'ir al-Nasr Brigade, a rebel group affiliated with the Free Syrian Army. However, following Churkin's announcement, Western governments said that they had yet to see any evidence that backs up the assertion that anyone besides the Assad regime had the ability to use chemical weapons. The Russian report was not released.

=== The OPCW Fact-Finding Mission in Syria ===
On 29 April 2014, the Director General Ahmet Üzümcü of the Organisation for the Prohibition of Chemical Weapons (OPCW) announced the creation of an OPCW mission to establish the facts surrounding allegations of the use of chlorine gas for hostile purposes in Syria. The Syrian Government has agreed to the mission.

On 27 May 2014, members of the mission were ambushed and briefly held by gunmen in rebel-held territory as it headed toward Kafr Zita to investigate the alleged chlorine gas attacks. According to the Associated Press, the OPCW said that the captive members of the mission were later "released after the intervention by Syria's main opposition group." The opposition Hama Media Centre said the attack on the convoy was carried out by President Bashar al-Assad's forces. In 2014, the OPCW Fact-Finding Mission in Syria concluded that the use of chlorine was systematic and widespread.

In its third report dated 18 December 2014, the mission concluded that chlorine was used in the villages of Talmenes, Al-Tamanah and Kafr Zita, but did not assign blame.

In early 2015 the mission disclosed previously undeclared traces of sarin and VX precursor compounds in a Ba'athist Syrian military research site, the Scientific Studies and Research Centre, where use of those compounds had not been previously declared.

=== The UN-OPCW Joint Investigative Mechanism ===
On 7 August 2015, the United Nations Security Council adopted resolution 2235 (2015) to establish a joint investigation mechanism (JIM) to identify the perpetrators responsible for the use of chemical weapons in Syria. The resolution was drafted by the United States, and adopted by all 15 members of the Security Council. In 2015, the OPCW-UN Joint Investigative Mechanism (OPCW-UN JIM) was established to identify the perpetrators of chemical attacks in Syria.

The JIM issued its first report on 12 February 2016. The second was released on 10 June 2016, while the third report was issued on 30 August 2016. The third report blamed the Syrian government for two gas attacks in 2015, and accused ISIS of using mustard gas. In October 2016 the leaked fourth report of task force determined that Ba'athist Syrian regime had conducted at least three gas attacks in 2015.

On 26 October 2017, the JIM delivered the report (37 pages) to the UN.

In late 2017, the JIM released its report on the April Khan Shaykhun chemical attack, attributing responsibility for the incident to the Syrian government.

Reuters reported in 2018 that, according to OPCW and diplomatic sources, an OPCW chemical marker analysis linked the destroyed stockpile samples to sarin samples from 21 August 2013 Ghouta attack and also to interviewees' samples from Khan Sheikhoun and Khan Al-Assal attack sites. These findings were not released because they were outside the OPCW's mandate.

=== The UN-OPCW Investigation and Identification Team ===
On 8 April 2020, the OPCW Investigation and Identification Team (IIT), set up in 2018, issued its first report, determining that the Syrian Air Force was the perpetrator of the chemical weapon attacks in Latamenah.

On 12 April 2021, the OPCW IIT released a second report, which concluded that there were reasonable grounds to believe that the Syrian Arab Air Force carried out a chlorine attack on eastern Saraqib on 4 February 2018. Findings of another OPCW investigation report published by the IIT in July 2021 revealed that the Syrian regime had engaged in confirmed chemical attacks at least 17 times, out of the reported 77 chemical weapon attacks attributed to the regime's security forces. The third report published on 27 January 2023 by the OPCW-IIT concluded that the Assad regime was responsible for the 2018 Douma chemical attack which killed at least 43 civilians and injured over 500. (Note: Sources: "OPCW Releases Third Report by Investigation and Identification Team". 27 January 2023. Archived from the original on 27 January 2023.; "Third Report by the OPCW Investiogation and Identification Team" (PDF). 27 January 2023. pp. 2–139. Archived from the original (PDF) on 27 January 2023 – via OPCW.; "Joint Statement on OPCW Report Finding Syrian Regime Responsible for Chemical Weapons Attack in Douma, Syria on April 7, 2018". U.S. Department of State. 27 January 2023. Archived from the original on 28 January 2023.; "OPCW blames Syria gov't for 2018 chlorine gas attack in Douma". Al Jazeera. 27 January 2023.; "Watchdog blames Syria for 2018 Douma chemical attack". BBC News. 27 January 2023. Archived from the original on 28 January 2023.; Chulov, Martin (27 January 2023). "Syrian regime found responsible for Douma chemical attack". The Guardian. Archived from the original on 27 January 2023.; Loveluck, Louisa (27 January 2023). "Syrian army responsible for Douma chemical weapons attack, watchdog confirms". Washington Post.)

=== OPCW deployment after the fall of Assad ===
As the new government has renew full cooperation with the OPCW, the OPCW re-established its presence in Syria in November 2025. In May 2026, an OPCW expert team, supported by the Syrian authorities, discovered a significant amount of undeclared chemical weapons (rockets and aerial bombs), related materials, including ingredients for the production of sarin, and documentation. The team had focused on high-interest sites in northern coastal and central Syria, in an area broadly encompassing Hama, Homs and Latakia, with the weapons found including aerial bombs of the same type as those used in the March 2017 Al-Lataminah and April 2017 Khan Shaykhun attacks, and rockets of the same type as those used in the 2013 Ghouta attack.

== Other allegations ==
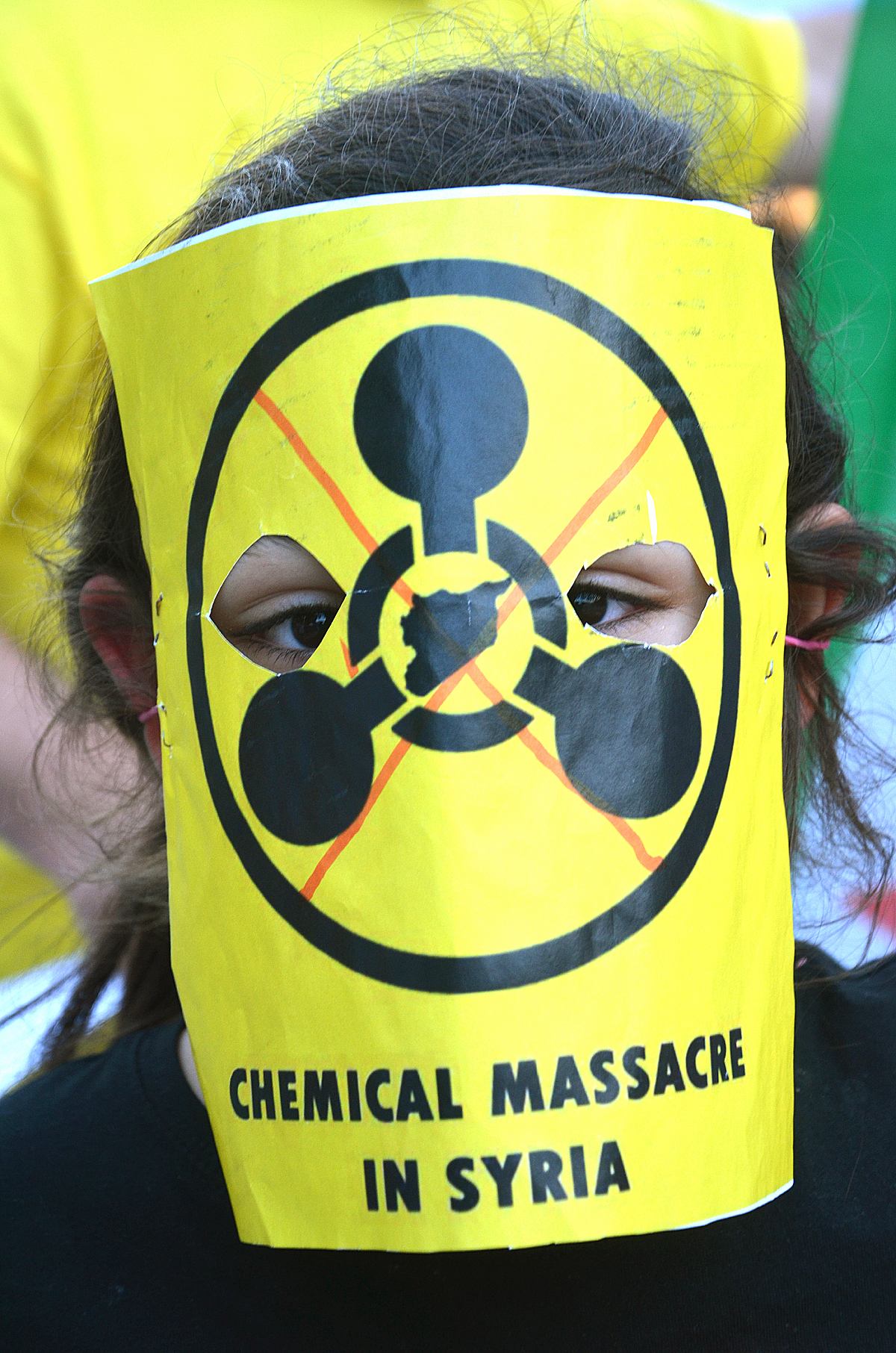
Photo of a Syrian girl who participated in an anti-Assad demonstration in Hannover on the second anniversary of the Ghouta massacre (21 August 2015)

In February 2012 a defector from the Syrian Army, a lieutenant who worked in the chemical weapons department, told Turkish newspaper Hürriyet Daily News that "BZ-CS, Chlorine Benzilate, which damages people's nerves and makes them fade away, is being used in Baba Amr." He said that some Syrian soldiers had been supplied with gas masks for protection.

In December 2012, the Syrian government claimed that chemical plant SYSACCO 29 kilometers (18 mi) east of Aleppo was taken by rebel fighters from the Al-Nusra Front. The factory produces chlorine among other chemicals. On 5 November 2014, the Syrian UN-ambassador Bashar al-Jaafari, said "terrorist organizations stole about 200 tons of [chlorine gas] from" the factory.

In January 2013, US State Department cables showed a US investigation had found evidence that the Syrian military had used a chemical weapon on 23 December 2012, which was the first time an official investigation documented chemical weapon use in the conflict. On 4 June, the French foreign minister Laurent Fabius similarly declared certainty that the Syrian government had used sarin on multiple instances.

On 30 May 2013, Turkish newspapers reported that Turkish security forces had arrested Al-Nusra Front fighters in the southern provinces of Mersin and Adana near the Syrian border and confiscated 2 kg of sarin gas. The Turkish Ambassador to Moscow later said that tests showed the chemical seized was not sarin, but anti-freeze. In September six of those arrested in May were charged with attempting to acquire chemicals which could be used to produce sarin; the indictment said that it was "possible to produce sarin gas by combining the materials in proper conditions."

On 1 June 2013, the Syrian Army reported that it seized two cylinders holding the nerve agent sarin in an area it said was controlled by opposition fighters. The Syrian government declared the two cylinders "as abandoned chemical weapons" and told the OPCW that "the items did not belong to" them. On 14 June 2014, the Joint OPCW-UN Mission confirmed that the cylinders contained sarin. On 7 July 2014, the U.N. Secretary-General Ban Ki-Moon informed the U.N. Security Council about the findings.

In September 2015 a US official stated that ISIS was manufacturing and using mustard agent in Syria and Iraq, and had an active chemical weapons research team. In February 2016, the CIA Director John O. Brennan said on 60 Minutes that there were "a number of instances where ISIL has used chemical munitions on the battlefield".

On 8 April 2016, a spokesman for the Jaysh al-Islam rebel group said that "weapons not authorized for use in these types of confrontations" had been used against Kurdish militia and civilians in Aleppo (160 killed or wounded). He stated that "One of our commanders has unlawfully used a type of weapon that is not included in our list". He did not specify what substances were used but, according to Kurdish Red Crescent, the symptoms were consistent with the use of "chlorine gas or other agents". Jaysh al-Islam subsequently clarified that it was referring to "modified Grad rockets," not chemical weapons.

On 4 May 2017, the BBC reported that, according to a Western intelligence agency, Syria was violating the 2013 disarmament deal by producing chemical and biological munitions at Masyaf, Dummar, and Barzeh.

On 27 June 2017, US officials stated that the Syrian government was preparing at a Syrian base for what seemed another chemical attack. The Trump administration warned that if another attack occurred, President Assad would pay a heavy price. This threat came as the intelligence community stated that the activity was similar to the preparations leading to the attack in Khan Sheikhoun.

Around 16 February 2018, the SOHR and the U.S.-backed Kurdish YPG stated that Turkey was suspected of conducting a chemical gas attack in Afrin. Syrian state news agency SANA, citing a doctor in an Afrin hospital, stated the shelling caused choking in six people.

In April 2018, Human Rights Watch published a report based on seven data sources, including the UN investigations, and was able to confirm 85 chemical attacks between 21 August 2013 and 25 February 2018, including more than 50 perpetrated by the government (including 42 using chlorine, 2 using sarin and 7 using unspecified chemicals) and three by ISIS (using sulphur mustard), with the remainder not attributed.

In October 2018, BBC Panorama and BBC Arabic investigated 164 reports of chemical attacks and were able to confirm 106 of them, 51 of which were certainly launched from the air and therefore could only have been perpetrated by the government or its allies.

In February 2019, the German thinktank Global Public Policy Institute (GPPi) published a report that "credibly substantiated" 336 uses of chemical weapons in the Syrian war, 98% of them by the government or allied forces (including several attributed to the Syrian Army's elite Tiger Forces) and the remainder by ISIL.

In May 2019, there were reports of a chemical attack on Kabana in Latakia.

== See also ==
- List of Syrian civil war barrel bomb attacks
- List of massacres during the Syrian civil war
- Use of chemical weapons in the War in Iraq
