= United Nations Security Council Resolution 2235 =

UN Security Council Resolution 2235
- Date: 7 August 2015
- Meeting no.: 7501
- Code: S/RES/2235 (Document)
- Subject: Syria Chemical Weapons Joint Investigative Mechanism
- Voting summary: 15 voted for; None voted against; None abstained; None absent
- Result: Adopted

Security Council composition
- Permanent members: China; France; Russia; United Kingdom; United States
- Non-permanent members: Angola; Chad; Chile; Jordan; Lithuania; Malaysia; New Zealand; Nigeria; Spain; Venezuela

The United Nations Security Council Resolution 2235 is on establishing a Joint Investigative Mechanism to identify individuals, entities, groups, or governments responsible for use of chemical weapons in the Syrian civil war.

== Resolution ==
The Security Council,

Recalling the Protocol for the Prohibition of the Use in War of Asphyxiating, Poisonous or other Gases, and of Bacteriological Methods of Warfare, and the Convention on the Prohibition of the Development, Production, Stockpiling and Use of Chemical Weapons and on their Destruction (CWC), and the Council’s resolutions 1540 (2004), 2118 (2013) and 2209 (2015),

Recalling that the Syrian Arab Republic acceded to the CWC, noting that the use of any toxic chemical, such as chlorine, as a chemical weapon in the Syrian Arab Republic is a violation of resolution 2118, and further noting that any such use by the Syrian Arab Republic would constitute a violation of the CWC,

Condemning in the strongest terms any use of any toxic chemical as a weapon in the Syrian Arab Republic and noting with outrage that civilians continue to be killed and injured by toxic chemicals as weapons in the Syrian Arab Republic,

Reaffirming that the use of chemical weapons constitutes a serious violation of international law, and stressing again that those individuals responsible for any use of chemical weapons must be held accountable,

Recalling its request to the Director-General of the Organisation for the Prohibition of Chemical Weapons (OPCW) and the Secretary-General to report in a coordinated manner on non-compliance with resolution 2118,

Noting the letter of the Secretary-General to the President of the Security Council of 25 February 2015 (S/2015/138), transmitting the note of the Director-General of the OPCW, discussing the decision of the OPCW Executive Council of 4 February 2015 that expressed serious concern regarding the findings of the Fact-Finding Mission (FFM) made with a high degree of confidence that chlorine has been used repeatedly and systematically as a weapon in the Syrian Arab Republic,

Noting that toxic chemicals as weapons have allegedly been used subsequent to the adoption on 6 March of Security Council resolution 2209 (2015),

Recognizing that the OPCW FFM is not mandated to reach conclusions about attributing responsibility for chemical weapons use,

Recalling that, in its resolution 2118, it decided that the Syrian Arab Republic and all parties in Syria shall cooperate fully with the OPCW and the United Nations,

1. Reiterates its condemnation in the strongest terms of any use of any toxic chemical, such as chlorine, as a weapon in the Syrian Arab Republic;
2. Recalls its decision that the Syrian Arab Republic shall not use, develop, produce, otherwise acquire, stockpile or retain chemical weapons, or, transfer, directly or indirectly, chemical weapons to other States or non-State actors;
3. Reiterates that no party in Syria should use, develop, produce, acquire, stockpile, retain, or transfer chemical weapons;
4. Expresses its determination to identify those responsible for these acts and reiterates that those individuals, entities, groups, or governments responsible for any use of chemicals as weapons, including chlorine or any other toxic chemical, must be held accountable, and calls on all parties in the Syrian Arab Republic to extend their full cooperation in this regard;
5. Requests the UN Secretary-General, in coordination with the OPCW Director General, to submit to the Security Council, for its authorization, within 20 days of the adoption of this resolution, recommendations, including elements of Terms of Reference, regarding the establishment and operation of an OPCW-United Nations Joint Investigative Mechanism to identify to the greatest extent feasible individuals, entities, groups, or governments who were perpetrators, organizers, sponsors or otherwise involved in the use of chemicals as weapons, including chlorine or any other toxic chemical, in the Syrian Arab Republic where the OPCW FFM determines or has determined that a specific incident in the Syrian Arab Republic involved or likely involved the use of chemicals as weapons, including chlorine or any other toxic chemical, and expresses its intent to respond to the recommendations, including elements of Terms of Reference, within five days of receipt;
6. Requests further that after the Security Council has authorized the Joint Investigative Mechanism that the United Nations Secretary-General, in coordination with the OPCW Director General, undertake without delay the steps, measures, and arrangements necessary for the speedy establishment and full functioning of the Joint Investigative Mechanism, including recruiting impartial and experienced staff with relevant skills and expertise in accordance with Terms of Reference and notes due regard should be paid to the importance of recruiting the staff on as wide of a geographical basis as is practicable;
7. Recalls that in its resolution 2118, it decided that the Syrian Arab Republic and all parties in Syria shall cooperate fully with the OPCW and the United Nations and stresses that this includes an obligation to cooperate with the OPCW Director General and its FFM and the United Nations Secretary-General and the Joint Investigative Mechanism, that such cooperation includes full access to all locations, individuals, and materials in the Syrian Arab Republic that the Joint Investigative Mechanism deems relevant to its investigation and where it determines there are reasonable grounds to believe access is justified based on its assessment of the facts and circumstances known to it at the time, including in areas within the Syrian territory but outside of the control of the Syrian Arab Republic, and that such cooperation also includes the ability of the Joint Investigative Mechanism to examine additional information and evidence that was not obtained or prepared by the FFM but that is related to the mandate of the Joint Investigative Mechanism as set forth in paragraph 5;
8. Calls on all other States to cooperate fully with the Joint Investigative Mechanism and in particular to provide it and the OPCW FFM with any relevant information they may possess pertaining to individuals, entities, groups, or governments who were perpetrators, organizers, sponsors or otherwise involved in use of chemicals as weapons, including chlorine or any other toxic chemical, in the Syrian Arab Republic;
9. Requests the FFM to collaborate with the Joint Investigative Mechanism from the commencement of the Joint Investigative Mechanism’s work to provide full access to all of the information and evidence obtained or prepared by the FFM including but not limited to, medical records, interview tapes and transcripts, and documentary material, and requests the Joint Investigative Mechanism, with respect to allegations that are subject to investigation by the FFM, to work in coordination with the FFM to fulfil its mandate;
10. Requests the United Nations Secretary-General, in coordination with the OPCW Director General, to present a report to the United Nations Security Council and inform the OPCW Executive Council as of the date the Joint Investigative Mechanism begins its full operations and every 30 days thereafter on the progress made;
11. Requests the Joint Investigative Mechanism to complete its first report within 90 days of the date on which it commences its full operations, as notified by the United Nations Secretary-General, and complete subsequent reports as appropriate thereafter and requests the Joint Investigative Mechanism to present the report, or reports, to the United Nations Security Council and inform the OPCW Executive Council;
12. Requests the Joint Investigative Mechanism to retain any evidence related to possible uses of chemical weapons in the Syrian Arab Republic other than those cases in which the FFM determines or has determined that a specific incident in the Syrian Arab Republic involved or likely involved the use of chemicals as weapons, including chlorine or any other toxic chemical, and to transmit that evidence to the FFM through the Director General of the OPCW and to the Secretary-General as soon as practicable;
13. Affirms that action by the Security Council consistent with paragraph 5 is sufficient for the establishment of the Joint Investigative Mechanism;
14. Decides to establish the Joint Investigative Mechanism for a period of one year with a possibility of future extension by the Security Council, if it deems it necessary;
15. Reaffirms its decision in response to violations of resolution 2118 to impose measures under Chapter VII of the United Nations Charter;
16. Decides to remain actively seized of the matter.”

== See also ==
- United Nations Mission to Investigate Alleged Uses of Chemical Weapons in the Syrian Arab Republic
- The OPCW Fact-Finding Mission in Syria
- OPCW-UN Joint Investigative Mechanism
