= 2014 Kafr Zita chemical attack =

Chemical attack in Syrian civil war

- Part of the Syrian civil war
- Location: Kafr Zita, Hama, Syria
- Date: 11 April 2014
- Target: Unknown
- Attack type: Chemical attack
- Weapon: Chlorine
- Deaths: 3 civilians
- Injuries: Around 100, 5 seriously
- Perpetrator: Unknown

The 2014 Kafr Zita chemical attack occurred on 11 April 2014, in the rebel-held northern Syrian town of Kafr Zita during the Syrian Civil War. The attack reportedly wounded around 100 people (5 seriously) and killed three. Syria's state television, SANA blamed the attack on the Islamist Al-Nusra Front using "toxic chlorine", while the opposition blamed barrel bombs dropped by government forces.

== Background ==
The attack took place in Kafr Zita, a rebel-held village located 30 kilometers (19 mi) north of Hama, in the context of the Syrian Civil War. According to witnesses interviewed by the OPCW Fact-Finding Mission the village has suffered hundreds of conventional attacks since the start of the conflict in Syria.

== Incident ==
The chemical attack on 11 April 2014, occurred between 18:00 and 19:00. The bomb was dropped by a helicopter.

== Victims ==
The attack reportedly wounded around 100 people. Five were seriously wounded while an elderly man originally from Morek, his daughter, and a little girl died from the attack.

=== The elderly man ===
According to VDC, a local monitoring group, the elderly man that died was the 70-year-old Mustafa Ahmad al-Mohammad, an IDP from Morek. According to VDC, he was injured in the head "due to explosive barrel shelling on the town" and died in Kafr Zita at the day of the attack. This statement was supported by a local doctor and the doctor who heads the health department in Hama, which both said the man died from head injuries.

=== The daughter of the elderly man ===
According to VDC, the daughter of the elderly man was Marwa Mustafa Ahmad al-Mohammad, a single 30-year-old woman. According to VDC, she had severe symptoms from chlorine exposure and was transferred to a hospital in Turkey where she died five days after the attack due to inhaling of chemical and toxic gasses.

=== The little girl ===
According to the local doctor, the little girl died from shortness of breath, while the doctor from the health department in Hama said she died from head injuries.

== Initial Claims ==
Both the opposition and Syria's state television claimed that the attack led to the killing of two people and several cases of suffocation and poisoning.

=== Government claims ===
On Saturday 12 April, Syria's state television, SANA, claimed that rebels affiliated with the jihadist al-Nusra Front had used "toxic chlorine" on Friday 11 April while attacking the village of Kafr Zita, and said that "the attack led to the killing of two people" and that around 100 "suffered from suffocation".

=== Opposition claims ===
According to Rami Abdel Rahman, the director of the pro-opposition Syrian Observatory for Human Rights, "regime planes bombed Kafr Zita with explosive barrels that produced thick smoke and odours and led to cases of suffocation and poisoning."

Opposition activists said the chemical attack occurred during fierce fighting when government troops appeared to be losing control of the strategic town of Khan Shaykhun.

=== Local resident claims ===
Local eyewitnesses interviewed by a Palestinian intelligence expert said a "chemical substance" had caused smoke and fumes and that the device hadn't been deployed from a plane. "None of the two suffocation victims, none of the other victims who were affected but recover, or any of those who provided first aid and medical aid to any of the victims suffered any symptoms which would be consistent with a military-grade chemical weapon", the eyewitnesses said.

== Early Commentaries ==
Experts have stated that while using chlorine is not as deadly as conventional weapons, such chemical strikes are valuable in intimidating rebel factions, and according to David Kay, a former U.N. weapons inspector: "says a lot about their [Syrian regimes] lack of fear of consequences. What's the West going to do? It's done nothing so far."

According to Dina Esfandiary, of the International Institute for Strategic Studies, the attack was reported as a rebel atrocity on Syrian state TV before it had even happened.

== Analysis ==
According to Hamish de Bretton-Gordon, a director of SecureBio consultancy and a former commander of the British Army's chemical readiness forces, "[t]he evidence from Kafr Zita is pretty compelling and is certainly being examined very carefully by officials." Following subsequent scientific analysis of samples from multiple gas attacks, conducted exclusively for The Telegraph, he said: "We have unequivocally proved that the regime has used chlorine and ammonia against its own civilians in the last two to three weeks."

Independent investigations by reporters from the German magazine Der Spiegel and Daniele Raineri of Italy's Il Foglio found among the remnants of the bombs debris of apparently civilian Chlorine gas cylinders produced by Chinese manufacturer Norinco.

== Aftermath ==
Following the attack, Syria's opposition Syrian National Coalition called on the United Nations to investigate the incident, along with a similar alleged chemical attack on the same day in the Harasta suburb of Damascus, which was also allegedly attacked again with chemicals on 16 April. Later chemical attacks were reported in April at Al-Tamanah in Idlib Governorate, Zahraa near Homs and on the 22 April in both the Damascus suburb of Darayya and Talmenes, which is 32 kilometers (20 mi) northeast of Kafr Zita. On 19 May, it was alleged that Kafr Zita was again attacked with chlorine, the sixth alleged gas attack in the village in two months, killing one boy and leaving 130 villagers in need of medical attention, including 21 children who were in critical condition. On 21 May, it was again chemically attacked, along with Al-Tamanah, which is located 16 kilometers (9.9 mi) away from Kafr Zita.

On 20 April, French president François Hollande claimed that the Syrian government had used chlorine weapons, stating, "[w]e have a few elements of information but I do not have the proof". This was followed a day later by the U.S. State Department spokesperson Jen Psaki stating, "we're examining allegations that the government was responsible. We take all allegations of the use of chemicals in combat use very seriously." However, Andrew Tabler, a Syria expert with the Washington Institute for Near East Policy, has remarked on possible American action against the chlorine attacks that "Obama has been pronouncing the [Syrian chemical weapons] deal as a victory so I'm not sure he's ready to jump on the chlorine issue."

According to an investigation by The Telegraph, comprising testimony from doctors who have treated the wounded, relatives of the victims and eyewitnesses of the latest chemical attacks, it has found "evidence of the regime's continued and systematic use of chemical weapons in Syria" in order to combat heavy pressure from rebel forces. It also noted the rise in deaths and injuries attributed to the chlorine attacks.

== See also ==
- Ghouta chemical attack
- Chemical weapon
- Use of chemical weapons in the Syrian civil war
