= OPCW Fact-Finding Mission in Syria =

Investigates chemical weapons attacks

The OPCW Fact-Finding Mission in Syria is a mission of the Organisation for the Prohibition of Chemical Weapons (OPCW) to investigate some possible cases of the use of toxic chemicals in Syria during the civil war, including chlorine. The 21 August 2013 Ghouta chemical attack used sarin. The OPCW-Director General Ahmet Üzümcü announced the creation of the mission on 29 April 2014. This initial mission was headed by Malik Ellahi. The Syrian Government agreed to the Mission.

The Mission took over the work of the OPCW-UN Joint Mission in Syria, which had been formed to oversee the elimination of the Syrian chemical weapons program, and which ended its activities on 30 September 2014. On 4 September 2014, the head of the Joint Mission reported to the UN Security Council that 96% of Syria's declared stockpile, including the most dangerous chemicals, had been destroyed and preparation were underway to destroy the remaining 12 production facilities, a task to be completed by the OPCW Mission. On 4 January 2015, the OPCW stated that destruction was completed, though since then previously undeclared traces of compounds in a Syrian government military research site have been reported.

== 2014 ==
On 16 June 2014 the mission published its first summary report (S/1191/2014), covering the period from 3 to 31 May 2014. Its second report (S/1212/2014) was circulated to States Parties on 10 September 2014. Its third report (S/1230/2014) was dated 18 December 2014.

During its first visit in Syria, the mission attempted on May 27 to conduct one field visit to Kafr Zita, in Hama Governorate, held by the opposition, where chlorine gas was allegedly used for an attack on May 19, departing from government held Homs. It aborted the mission after its "leading vehicle was struck by an improvised explosive device", another vehicle was "attacked with automatic gun fire" and "the remaining two vehicles were intercepted by armed gunmen and members of the team detained for some time." The mission interviewed between 25 August and 5 September, in a safe location out of Syria, 37 witness of chlorine attacks of the villages of Talmenes, in Idlib Governorate, on 21 and 24 April 2014, Al-Tamanah, in Idlib Governorate, on 12, 18 and 30 April, 22 and 25 May 2014, and Kafr Zita, which suffered 14 attacks between 10 April and 30 August 2014) The third report presented the conclusions and evidence obtained from the interviewees. It estimates that those attacks were made with barrel bombs thrown from helicopters which killed 13 people — 3 in Talmenes, 8 in Al-Tamanah, and 2 in Kafr Zita.

== 2015 ==
A further three missions were initiated by OPCW in 2015, which were headed by different personnel and the reports passed through Ban Ki-Moon by Ahmet Üzümcü to the President of the Security Council in November 2015 (S/2015/908). The reports (S/1318/2015, S/1319/2015, and S/1320/2015, all dated 29 October 2015) were titled "Interim report of the OPCW Fact-Finding Mission in Syria regarding the incidents described in communications from the Deputy Minister for Foreign Affairs and Expatriates and the Head of the National Authority of the Syrian Arab Republic from 15 December 2014 to 15 June 2015", led by Steven Wallis, "Report of the OPCW Fact-Finding Mission in Syria Regarding Alleged Incidents in the Idlib Governorate of the Syrian Arab Republic between 16 March and 20 May 2015", dated 20 October 2015 led by Leonard Phillips and "Report of the OPCW fact-finding mission in Syria regarding alleged incidents in Marea, Syrian Arab Republic August 2015".

In early 2015 the mission disclosed previously undeclared traces of sarin and VX precursor compounds in a Syrian government military research site, the Scientific Studies and Research Centre, where use of those compounds had not been previously declared.

== 2017 ==
The OPCW expressed "serious concern" over the Khan Shaykhun chemical attack and said that its Fact-Finding Mission in Syria was "gathering and analysing information from all available sources." The following day, the Technical Secretariat of the OPCW, referring to the media reports, requested all member states of the Chemical Weapons Convention to share available information on what it described preliminary as "allegations of use of chemical weapons in the Khan Shaykhun area of Idlib province in the Syrian Arab Republic."

The OPCW declared on 19 April that lab results "indicate that the victims were exposed to sarin or a sarin-like substance."

== 2018 ==
A chemical attack on Douma took place on 7 April 2018 that killed at least 49 civilians with scores injured, and which has been blamed on the Assad government. On 10 April, the Syrian and Russian governments invited the OPCW to send a team to investigate the attacks. The investigators arrived in Damascus on April 14, but were blocked from entering Douma, saying they can not guarantee their safety. Under the evacuation agreement for Ghouta, the Syrian military were unable to enter Douma, so Russian Military Police assisted the OPCW mission. Concerns were also raised by US ambassador Kenneth D. Ward that Russia was trying to conceal the evidence, and that Russia had tampered with the site of the attack to thwart the OPCW fact finding mission; Russian Foreign Minister Sergei Lavrov denied any tampering had occurred.

On 17 April, the OPCW was promised access to the site, but had not entered Douma and was unable to carry out the inspection because their teams came under fire during a reconnaissance to visit sites of the chemical weapons attack. According to the OPCW director, “On arrival at site one, a large crowd gathered and the advice provided by the UNDSS was that the reconnaissance team should withdraw,” and “at site two, the team came under small arms fire and an explosive was detonated. The reconnaissance team returned to Damascus”, and at the site "the incident reportedly resulted in two fatalities and an injury to a Russian soldier." Following that incident, several security measures were increased, and during the next visits the investigation team could work undisturbed.

On 21 April, the OPCW Fact-Finding Mission visited a site in Douma to collect samples, and on 25 April visited a second site in Douma to collect further samples. The team also interviewed people related to incident in Damascus. On 4 May the OPCW announced that the initial deployment of the Fact-Finding Mission in Douma was complete, but that analysis of the samples would take at least three to four weeks. An interim report in July 2018 concluded that no evidence of nerve agents were found but that chlorinated organic agents were, and that further analysis was required to establish the provenance of a gas cylinder on the roof of the building hit in the strike.

The FFM in its final report in March 2019 concluded that the evaluation and analysis of all the information gathered by the FFM provide reasonable grounds that the use of a toxic chemical as a weapon took place and that the chemical agent used was molecular chlorine.

== 2023-2024 ==
The OPCW Investigation and Identification Team (IIT) released its fourth report, concluding that ISIL perpetrated a sulfur mustard chemical weapons attack on Marea, Syria, on 1 September 2015. The IIT’s comprehensive investigation was conducted from January 2023 to February 2024.

The attack involved the deployment of sulfur mustard via artillery, resulting in several impact locations with conventional artillery projectiles modified to disperse the chemical agent. The IIT determined that ISIL possessed the exclusive capability and organizational structure to carry out such an attack, linking specific individuals and departments within ISIL to the incident.

The investigation relied on various sources including interviews, samples analysis, computer modeling, and satellite imagery. OPCW Director-General Ambassador Fernando Arias emphasized the importance of the report in identifying chemical weapon perpetrators and highlighted the international community's responsibility to take action.

== Resolution on Syria ==
In November 2018, the committee voted for the 2019 Budget to inspect the situation of chemical weapons in the Syrian Arab Republic. The resolution passed with 99 in favor and 27 against.

In favour (99)	Abstaining (18)	Against (27)	Absent (9)
Albania; Andorra; Argentina; Australia; Austria; Bahrain; Bangladesh; Barbados; Belgium; Benin; Bhutan; Botswana; Brunei; Bulgaria; Cameroon; Canada; Chile; Colombia; Costa Rica; Croatia; Cyprus; Czech Republic; Denmark; Dominican Republic; Estonia; Fiji; Finland; France; Georgia; Germany; Greece; Ghana; Guyana; Holy See; Honduras; Hungary; Iceland; Indonesia; Ireland; Italy; Ivory Coast; Jamaica; Japan; Kenya; Kuwait; Latvia; Liberia; Libya; Liechtenstein; Lithuania; Luxembourg; Macedonia; Malawi; Malta; Mexico; Monaco; Moldova; Montenegro; Morocco; Netherlands; New Zealand; Nigeria; Norway; Oman; Panama; Papua New Guinea; Paraguay; Peru; Poland; Portugal; Qatar; Romania; Saint Kitts and Nevis; Saint Lucia; Samoa; San Marino; Saudi Arabia; Senegal; Seychelles; Singapore; Slovakia; Slovenia; Solomon Islands; South Korea; Spain; Sweden; Switzerland; Thailand; Togo; Tonga; Turkey; Ukraine; United Arab Emirates; United Kingdom; United States; Uruguay; Vanuatu; Vietnam	Afghanistan; Algeria; Bosnia and Herzegovina; Brazil; Burkina Faso; Ecuador; El Salvador; Ethiopia; India; Iraq; Jordan; Malaysia; Mongolia; Nepal; Philippines; Sri Lanka; Suriname; Uganda	Angola; Armenia; Belarus; Bolivia; Burundi; China; Congo; Comoros; Cuba; Guatemala; Iran; Kazakhstan; Kyrgyzstan; Laos; Mozambique; Myanmar; Nicaragua; Pakistan; Palestine; Russia; South Africa; Sudan; Syria; Tajikistan; Uzbekistan; Venezuela; Zimbabwe	Azerbaijan; Democratic Republic of the Congo; Madagascar; Mauritius; Rwanda; Serbia; Swaziland; Turkmenistan; Zambia

== See also ==
- Use of chemical weapons in the Syrian civil war
- Independent International Commission of Inquiry on the Syrian Arab Republic
- United Nations Mission to Investigate Alleged Uses of Chemical Weapons in the Syrian Arab Republic (2013)
- OPCW-UN Joint Investigative Mechanism (2015-2016)
