= OPCW-UN Joint Mission in Syria =

The OPCW-UN Joint Mission in Syria was jointly established on 16 October 2013 by the Organisation for the Prohibition of Chemical Weapons (OPCW) and the United Nations (UN) to oversee the elimination of the Syrian chemical weapons program. The Joint Mission continued the work of the OPCW-UN advance team that had arrived in Damascus on 1 October 2013.

On 7 October 2013, UN Secretary-General Ban Ki-moon stated that the Joint Mission would eventually have about 100 personnel in Syria, with a support base in Cyprus. In a letter to the Security Council, Ban set out the mission's three phases: establish an initial presence and verify Syria's stockpiles declaration; oversee chemical weapons destruction; and verify destruction of all chemical arms related materials and programs. On 13 October Ban announced that veteran UN diplomat Sigrid Kaag would head the Joint Mission.

By 23 June 2014, Syria's declared stockpile of chemical weapons had been shipped out of the country or destroyed. The Joint Mission officially ended on 30 September 2014. Its successor, the OPCW Fact-Finding Mission in Syria, was launched in April 2014.

== Background ==
On 27 September 2013, the OPCW Executive Council adopted decision EC-M-33/DEC.1 on the destruction of the Syrian chemical weapons program. This decision was endorsed by the unanimous adoption of United Nations Security Council Resolution 2118 (2013) on the same day.

The Executive Council decision set out an accelerated program for achieving the elimination of Syrian chemical weapons by mid-2014. It required inspections in Syria to commence from 1 October 2013 and called for deadlines for destruction which were to be set by the Executive Council by 15 November.

The decision was informed by the Framework for Elimination of Syrian Chemical Weapons, reached by Russia and the United States on 14 September, and facilitated the request by the Syria that the Chemical Weapons Convention be applied ahead of the formal entry into force of the Convention for Syria on 14 October.

== The Mission ==
The OPCW-UN Joint Mission in Syria was formally established on 16 October 2013., to oversee the timely elimination of the Syrian chemical weapons program in the safest and most secure manner possible. It continued the work of the OPCW-UN advance team that had arrived in Damascus on 1 October 2013.

On 23 June 2014, it was reported that the last shipment of Syria's declared chemical weapons was shipped out of the country for destruction. However, on 4 September 2014, the head of the Joint Mission reported to the UN Security Council that 96% of Syria's declared stockpile, including the most dangerous chemicals, had been destroyed and preparation were underway to destroy the remaining 12 production facilities, a task to be completed by the OPCW Fact-Finding Mission in Syria.

The Joint Mission officially ended on 30 September 2014.

== Aftermath ==
OPCW's operations Syria continued after the OPCW-UN Joint Mission ended. The OPCW Fact-Finding Mission in Syria was launched in April 2014.

== See also ==
- Independent International Commission of Inquiry on the Syrian Arab Republic
- United Nations Mission to Investigate Alleged Uses of Chemical Weapons in the Syrian Arab Republic
- The OPCW Fact-Finding Mission in Syria
- Destruction of Syria's chemical weapons
- OPCW-UN Joint Investigative Mechanism
