= OPCW-UN Joint Investigative Mechanism =

The United Nations Security Council adopted United Nations Security Council resolution 2235 (2015) on 7 August 2015, in response to use of chemical weapons in the Syrian Civil War. The resolution condemned "any use of any toxic chemical, such as chlorine, as a weapon in the Syrian Arab Republic" and expressed determination to identify and hold accountable those responsible for such acts. The resolution established a Joint Investigative Mechanism (JIM), a partnership between the United Nations (UN) and the Organisation for the Prohibition of Chemical Weapons (OPCW) . The Security Council renewed the JIM's mandate in resolution 2319 (2016) on 17 November 2016, for a further period of one year.

The mandate of the JIM lapsed in November 2017, after Russia blocked the renewal of its mandate.

== Background ==
The JIM's mandate, as per resolution 2235 (2015) and renewed by resolution 2319 (2016), was to identify, to the greatest extent feasible, individuals, entities, groups or governments who were perpetrators, organizers, sponsors or otherwise involved in the use of chemicals as weapons, including chlorine or any other toxic chemical, in Syria where the OPCW fact-finding mission determines or has determined that a specific incident in the Syrian Arab Republic involved or likely involved the use of chemicals as weapons. Additionally, in resolution 2319 (2016), the JIM was, inter alia, encouraged to consult appropriate United Nations counter-terrorism and non proliferation bodies, in particular the Security Council Committee established pursuant to resolution 1540 (2004) and the Security Council Committee pursuant to resolutions 1267 (1999), 1989 (2011) and 2253 (2015) concerning Islamic State in Iraq and the Levant (Da’esh), and Al-Qaida Sanctions Committee, in order to exchange information on non-State actor perpetration, organization, sponsorship, or other involvement in use of chemicals as weapons in the Syrian Arab Republic.

Furthermore, the JIM was also invited to engage relevant regional States in pursuit of its mandate, including in order to identify to the greatest extent feasible any individuals, entities or groups associated with ISIL or the Al-Nusrah Front. Relevant Regional States were also encouraged to provide, as appropriate, to the JIM information on non-State actors’ access to chemical weapons and their components or efforts by non-State actors to develop, acquire, manufacture, possess, transport, transfer or use chemical weapons and their means of delivery that occur under their jurisdiction.

== Funding ==
The JIM is a special political mission and is funded by the UN General Assembly through the regular budget. This funding covers only the salaries of the Leadership Panel and the staff of the JIM. In addition, the JIM has established a Voluntary Trust Fund in September 2015 to cover material and technical needs of the Mechanism.

== Composition ==
The JIM consisted of a three-member leadership panel, headed by an Assistant Secretary General. The panel's two other members advised on political and investigative components, respectively. On 27 April 2017, the Secretary-General announced the appointment of Edmond Mulet as the Head of the three-member Leadership Panel of the JIM. The Leadership Panel is supported by a team of 23 experienced staff with relevant skills and expertise, based in offices in New York and The Hague.

Edmond Mulet is a Guatemalan diplomat who served in various UN posts (including Chef de Cabinet to the former Secretary-General Ban Ki-moon from 2015 to 2016, Assistant Secretary-General for Peacekeeping Operations from 2007 to 2010 and again in 2011–2015, and Special Representative of the Secretary-General and Head of the United Nations Stabilization Mission in Haiti (MINUSTAH) between 2006-2007 and 2010–2011).

== Investigations ==
The JIM submitted four reports to the Security Council during the course of 2016. Its fifth report, the first under resolution 2319 (2016), was submitted on 13 February 2017 and its sixth report was submitted on 28 June 2017. In late 2017, the JIM released its report on the April 2017 Khan Shaykhun chemical attack, attributing responsibility for the incident to the Syrian government.

== See also ==
- Use of chemical weapons in the Syrian civil war
- Independent International Commission of Inquiry on the Syrian Arab Republic
- United Nations Mission to Investigate Alleged Uses of Chemical Weapons in the Syrian Arab Republic
- The OPCW Fact-Finding Mission in Syria
- OPCW-UN Joint Mission in Syria
