= Sarmin chemical attack =

- Part of the Syrian Civil War
- Type: Chlorine attack
- Location: Sarmin, Idlib Governorate, Syria; 35°54′12″N 36°43′33″E
- Date: 16 March 2015 around 22:30 to 23:00. (UTC+03:00)
- Executed by: Ba'athist Syria; Syrian Air Force
- Casualties: 6 killed
- Location of Sarmin within Syria

The Sarmin chemical attack was a chlorine attack that took place on 16 March 2015, in the village of Sarmin in the Idlib Governorate of Syria.

== Background ==
On 6 March 2015, the United Nations Security Council adopted resolution Resolution 2209, which condemns the use of chlorine as a weapon, and threatened to use force if it was used again.

== Attack ==
At the time of the attack the town was under the control of Ahrar al-Sham. The village was struck by a chemical attack around 22:30 to 23:00 when two "barrel bombs" reportedly were dropped by helicopters on the village. One fell on an open field, while the other "fell through the ventilation shaft" of a partially built house, killing a family of six living in the basement of the house and injuring "dozens more".

The Syrian military has denied the claim, describing it as propaganda.

== Responsibility ==
A year-long United Nations and OPCW inquiry found there was sufficient information to conclude that the Syrian Arab Air Force had used "makeshift weapons deployed from helicopters" that contained chlorine on the town of Talmenes in April 2014 and the town of Sarmin in March 2015.

== Victims ==
A family of six, including three children under the age of three and their grandmother, died. A doctor in Sarmin said the manner of death indicated a gas, possibly chlorine.

== See also ==
- Use of chemical weapons in the Syrian civil war
