= United Nations Mission to Investigate Alleged Uses of Chemical Weapons in the Syrian Arab Republic =

The United Nations Mission to Investigate Allegations of the Use of Chemical Weapons in the Syrian Arab Republic was a United Nations fact-finding mission to investigate possible use of chemical weapons in Syria. The mission was established by the U.N. Secretary-general Ban Ki-moon on 21 March 2013 to investigate the 19 March 2013 Khan al-Assal chemical attack that was brought to the Secretary-general's attention by the Syrian Government. On 27 March 2013, the secretary-general appointed Åke Sellström to head the mission. The mission had an OPCW component headed by Scott Cairns and a WHO component headed by Maurizio Barbeschi.

On 16 September 2013, the mission published a report with focus on the Ghouta chemical attack that occurred on 21 August 2013. The next day, Åke Sellström and his team, answered questions about the report on a press conference. On 12 December 2013, the mission delivered its final report to the U.N. Secretary-General Ban Ki-moon.

The mission investigated 7 of 16 alleged chemical attacks:

- 2012-10-17 Salquin (also spelled Salqin)
- 2012-12-23 Homs
- 2013-3-13 Darayya
- **2013-3-19 Khan al-Assal** (also spelled Khan al-Asal)
- 2013-3-19 Otaybah
- 2013-3-24 Adra
- 2013-4-12 to 4-14 Jobar
- **2013-4-13 Sheikh Maqsood**
- 2013-4-25 Darayya
- **2013-4-29 Saraqeb** (also spelled Saraqib)
- 2013-5-14 Qasr Abu Samrah
- 2013-5-23 Adra
- **2013-8-21 Ghouta**
- **2013-8-22 Bahhariyeh** (also spelled al-Bahariyah)
- **2013-8-24 Jobar**
- **2013-8-25 Ashrafiah Sahnaya** (also spelled Ashrafiyat Sahnaya)

Normal text indicates that the mission did not find sufficient or credible information to further investigate the alleged chemical attacks.

Bold text indicates that the mission decided to further investigate the attack.

== See also ==
- Independent International Commission of Inquiry on the Syrian Arab Republic
- Use of chemical weapons in the Syrian civil war
