= Talmenes chemical attack =

2014 attack in Talmenes, Syria

- Part of the Syrian Civil War
- Type: Chlorine attack
- Location: Talmenes, Idlib Governorate, Syria; 35°38′18″N 36°44′22″E
- Date: 21 April 2014; 10:30 (UTC+03:00)
- Executed by: Ba'athist Syria; Syrian Air Force
- Casualties: 3 killed 133 injured
- Location of Talmenes within Syria

The Talmenes chemical attack took place on 21 April 2014, in the village of Talmenes in Idlib Governorate of Syria. The village was struck by a chemical attack around 10:30 when two “barrel bombs” embedded with cylinders of chlorine gas reportedly were dropped on the village. The bombs struck two houses some 100 m from each other, in the neighbourhood around the “big” mosque. According to Human Rights Watch, the attack killed three civilians and wounded about 133.

At the time of the attack the town was under the control of Ahrar al-Sham and the Al-Nusra Front.

A year-long United Nations and OPCW inquiry found there was sufficient information to conclude that the Syrian Arab Air Force had used "makeshift weapons deployed from helicopters" that contained chlorine on the town of Talmenes in April 2014 and the town of Sarmin in March 2015.
