= Chlorine gas poisoning =

Chlorine poisoning
- Other names: Chlorine gas toxicity
- Specialty: Emergency medicine

Chlorine gas poisoning is an illness resulting from the effects of exposure to chlorine beyond the threshold limit value. Acute chlorine gas poisoning primarily affects the respiratory system, causing difficulty breathing, cough, irritation of the eyes, nose, and throat, and sometimes skin irritation. Higher exposures can lead to severe lung damage, such as toxic pneumonitis or pulmonary edema, with concentrations around 400 ppm and beyond potentially fatal. Chronic exposure to low levels can result in respiratory issues like asthma and chronic cough. Common exposure sources include occupational settings, accidental chemical mixing, and industrial accidents. Diagnosis involves tests like pulse oximetry, chest radiography, and pulmonary function tests. Treatment is supportive, with no antidote, and involves oxygen and bronchodilators for lung damage. Most individuals with mild exposure recover within a few days, though some may develop long-term respiratory issues.

== Signs and symptoms ==
The signs of acute chlorine gas poisoning are primarily respiratory, and include difficulty breathing and cough; listening to the lungs will generally reveal crackles. There will generally be sneezing, nose irritation, burning sensations, and throat irritations. There may also be skin irritations or chemical burns and eye irritation or conjunctivitis. A person with chlorine gas poisoning may also have nausea, vomiting, or a headache.

Chronic exposure to relatively low levels of chlorine gas may cause pulmonary problems like acute wheezing attacks, chronic cough with phlegm, and asthma.

== Causes ==
Occupational exposures constitute the highest risk of toxicity and common domestic exposures result from the mixing of chlorine bleach with acidic washing agents such as acetic, nitric or phosphoric acid. They also occur as a result of the chlorination of table water. Other exposure risks occur during industrial or transportation accidents. Wartime exposure is rare.

=== Dose toxicity ===
Humans can smell chlorine gas at ranges from 0.1–0.3 ppm. According to a review from 2010: "At 1–3 ppm, there is mild mucous membrane irritation that can usually be tolerated for about an hour. At 5–15 ppm, there is moderate mucous membrane irritation. At 30 ppm and beyond, there is immediate chest pain, shortness of breath, and cough. At approximately 40–60 ppm, a toxic pneumonitis and/or acute pulmonary edema can develop. Concentrations of about 400 ppm and beyond are generally fatal over 30 minutes, and at 1,000 ppm and above, fatality ensues within only a few minutes."

== Mechanism ==
The concentration of the inhaled gas and duration of exposure and water contents of the tissues exposed are the key determinants of toxicity; moist tissues like the eyes, throat, and lungs are the most susceptible to damage.

Once inhaled, chlorine gas diffuses into the epithelial lining fluid (ELF) of the respiratory epithelium and may directly interact with small molecules, proteins and lipids there and damage them, or may hydrolyze to hypochlorous acid and hydrochloric acid which in turn generate chloride ions and reactive oxygen species; the dominant theory is that most damage is via the acids.

== Diagnosis ==
Tests performed to confirm chlorine gas poisoning and monitor patients for supportive care include pulse oximetry, testing serum electrolyte, blood urea nitrogen (BUN), and creatinine levels, measuring arterial blood gases, chest radiography, electrocardiogram (ECG), pulmonary function testing, and laryngoscopy or bronchoscopy.

== Treatment ==
There is no antidote for chlorine poisoning; management is supportive after evacuating people from the site of exposure and flushing exposed tissues. For lung damage caused by inhalation, oxygen and bronchodilators may be administered.

== Outcomes ==
There is no way to predict outcomes. Most people with mild to moderate exposure generally recover fully in three to five days, but some develop chronic problems such as reactive airway disease. Smoking or pre-existing lung conditions like asthma appear to increase the risk of long term complications.

== Epidemiology ==
In 2014, the American Association of Poison Control Centers reported about 6,000 exposures to chlorine gas in the US in 2013, compared with 13,600 exposures to carbon monoxide, which was the most common poison gas exposure; the year before they reported about 5,500 cases of chlorine gas poisoning compared with around 14,300 cases of carbon monoxide poisoning.

== Mass poisoning incidents ==
=== Wartime ===
- In 1915, the German Army used chlorine against Allied soldiers in the 2nd Battle of Ypres.
- Also in 1915, the German Army used chlorine against Russian soldiers during the battle for Osowiec Fortress in the battle known as the Attack of the Dead Men.
- In 2005 chlorine was used by insurgents in the Iraqi insurgency (2003–11),
- In 2014 chlorine was allegedly used in Kafr Zita, Syria.

=== Industrial accidents ===
==== United States ====
There have been many instances of mass chlorine gas poisonings in industrial accidents.

- In 1987 in Bellingham, WA, a spill of ferric oxide while filling a rail car at a Georgia Pacific paper mill caused a partial evacuation of the downtown area. 7 people were officially injured.
- In 2002 in Missouri, a flex hose ruptured during unloading a train car at a chemical plant, releasing approximately 16,900 pounds (7,700 kg) of chlorine gas. 67 persons were injured.
- In 2004 in Macdona, Texas, a freight train accident released 9,400 US gallons (36,000 L; 7,800 imp gal) of chlorine gas and other toxic chemicals. At least 40 people were injured and three died, including two residents and the train conductor.
- In 2005 in South Carolina a freight train derailed, releasing an estimated 11,500 US gallons (44,000 L; 9,600 imp gal) of chlorine. Nine people died, and at least 529 persons sought medical care.

==== Globally ====
- In 2015, In Nigeria, the explosion of a chlorine gas storage tank at a water treatment plant in Jos killed eight people.
- In 2017, chlorine gas was released in Fort McMurray, Alberta, Canada, after chemicals were mixed improperly at a water treatment plant. In 2020 the Regional Municipality of Wood Buffalo was fined $150,000 (CAD) for the incident.
- In 2020, on March 6, an incident occurred at EPCL (Engro Polymer and Chemicals Limited) Port Qasim, Karachi, where over 50 people were hospitalized as a result of chlorine gas leakage. No fatalities were reported.
- In 2022, on June 27, a tank holding chlorine gas in the port of Aqaba, Jordan, fell and ruptured. 14 people were killed and more than 260 were injured.
