= Al-Bahariyah =

Al-Bahariyah البحارية
- Village
- Location within Syria
- Coordinates: 33°31′48″N 36°31′33″E
- Country: Syria
- Governorate: Rif Dimashq
- District: Douma
- Subdistrict: al-Nashabiyah

Population (2004)
  - Total: 2,568
- Time zone: UTC+2 (EET)
  - Summer (DST): UTC+3 (EEST)

Al-Bahariyah (Arabic: البحارية) is a village in eastern Ghouta, 20 kilometers (12 mi) east of Damascus city center. The village is administratively a part of the Douma District in the Rif Dimashq Governorate. Damascus International Airport is located 13 kilometers (8.1 mi) south of Al-Bahariyah. It had a population of 2,568 at the time of the 2004 Census. The village was largely destroyed in August 2013 and was the site of an alleged chemical weapons attack during the Syrian Civil War.
