= Avdiko =

Avdiko قرية ايدق كريف
- Village
- Location within Syria
- Coordinates: 36°49′23″N 38°19′15″E
- Country: Syria
- Governorate: Aleppo
- District: Ayn al-Arab
- Nahiyah: Kobani
- Time zone: UTC+2 (EET)
  - Summer (DST): UTC+3 (EEST)

Avdiko (Arabic: قرية ايدق كريف), also spelled Aydiq, is a village in Syria, ca. 8 kilometers (5.0 mi) south of Kobanî. The village is a part of the Ayn al-Arab District in the Aleppo Governorate.

== Avdiko during the Syrian Civil War ==
On 2 July 2014, Kobanê and the surrounding villages came under attack from fighters of the Islamic State of Iraq and the Levant. On 12 July 2014, the village was the location of a chemical weapon attack, which resulted in three deceased Kurdish fighters from the People's Protection Units. The 3 fatalities had burns and white spots on their bodies, leading experts to believe a mustard gas or another blister agent was used.
