= Saraqib chemical attack =

Alleged chemical attack in Syria

- Part of the Syrian Civil War
- Type: Sarin attack
- Location: Saraqib, Idlib Governorate, Syria; 35°51′52″N 36°48′27″E
- Date: 29 April 2013 (UTC+03:00)
- Casualties: 1 killed 10 injured
- Location of Saraqib within Syria

The Saraqib chemical attack is an alleged attack that was reported to take place in Saraqib in Idlib Governorate in Syria on 29 April 2013. A further attack occurred in February 2018, during which, according to the United Nations Organisation for the Prohibition of Chemical Weapons (OPCW) Investigation and Identification Team (IIT), “at least one cylinder” of chlorine gas was dropped, spreading “over a large area” and affecting at least 12 Syrians on the ground. The IIT attributed the attack to Syrian government military, specifically the Syrian Arab Army's Tiger Forces.

== Attack ==
On 29 April 2013, a helicopter was seen passing above the western part of Saraqueb, a source close to the opposition claimed. The source said the helicopter was flying from north to south and that a trail of white smoke came down from the helicopter as three objects were dropped. According to the source, the first object landed in the northern area of the town, the second landed in the middle of the courtyard of a family house, and the third landed close to an opposition checkpoint on the road to Idlib.

Around 16:40 a doctor at the Shifa Hospital was called in order to assist with two patients, a 52-year-old woman and her pregnant daughter-in-law.

== Victims ==
The 52-year-old woman was severely intoxicated. She died between 22:30 and 22:45 just before arriving at a hospital in Turkey. Test results indicated that she had been exposed to sarin. Her daughter-in-law had moderate symptoms and recovered after 15 to 20 minutes of atropine treatment, but was also sent to a hospital in Turkey. She arrived at a border hospital at 19:30. She could then walk, but had, according to the medical officer, nausea and was vomiting.

Other alleged victims with milder symptoms was also sent to Turkey, however, the examining doctor did not observe symptoms consistent with exposure to toxic chemicals, and initial tests of blood samples tested negative for sarin gas.

== Aftermath ==
The UN mission collected evidence that suggests that chemical weapons were used in the attack on "a small scale" against civilians. However, "in the absence of primary information on the delivery system(s) and environmental samples collected and analysed under the chain of custody", the UN mission "could not establish the link between the alleged event, the alleged site and the deceased woman".

On 26 April 2017, French Foreign Minister Jean-Marc Ayrault said the sarin used in the attack was similar to the sarin used in the 4 April 2017 Khan Shaykhun chemical attack and that hexamine was found in samples taken after both attacks. The French report directly linked the sarin to the regime.

== See also ==
- Use of chemical weapons in the Syrian civil war
