= Ashrafiyat Sahnaya chemical attack =

2013 incident in southwestern Syria

- Part of the Syrian Civil War
- Type: Sarin attack
- Location: Ashrafiyat Sahnaya, Rif Dimashq Governorate, Syria; 33°26′02″N 36°14′42″E
- Date: 25 August 2013 around 20:00 (UTC+03:00)
- Casualties: 5 injured
- Location of Ashrafiyat Sahnaya within Syria

Timeline of attack

25 August 2013

- App. 18:00 - The rebels started to throw objects with a catapult.
- App. 20:00 - The rebels throw an object containing sarin at a group of five Syrian Army soldiers. A badly smelling gas was released.
- App. 20:45 - The five soldiers were evacuated by a rescue team to the field medical point.
- The five soldiers were taken to the Martyr Yusuf Al Azmah Military Hospital by ambulance.
- The soldiers were washed, taken to the emergency room and treated with atropine and HI-6.
- Hospital personnel took blood samples that later tested positive for sarin.

30 August 2013

- The UN mission interviewed the five soldiers at Martyr Yusuf Al Azmah Military Hospital and collected blood samples, hair samples and urine from one of them.

25 September 2013

- The UN mission conducted detailed interviews with four of the five soldiers at Martyr Yusuf Al Azmah Military Hospital, and collected blood samples from three of them.
All times are UTC+03:00.

The Ashrafiyat Sahnaya chemical attack took place in Ashrafiyat Sahnaya, Syria, on 25 August 2013. A group of Syrian Army soldiers were struck by an object containing sarin.

== Background ==
On the day of the attack fighting occurred between Syrian Army soldiers and opposition fighters in Ashrafiyat Sahnaya, as part of the Rif Dimashq offensive (March–August 2013). At around 18:00, the rebels started to throw objects with a catapult.

== Attack ==
Around 20:00 an object filled with sarin was thrown at a group of five Syrian Army soldiers. The object landed 10–15 meters from them, and released a badly smelling gas. The five soldiers were immediately taken to a field medical point where they were treated with injections, eye droplets and oxygen. They were then transported to Martyr Yusuf Al Azmah Military Hospital for emergency care, where medical personnel took blood samples. The blood samples tested positive for sarin.

== Aftermath ==
The United Nations Mission to Investigate Alleged Uses of Chemical Weapons in the Syrian Arab Republic collected evidence "that suggests that chemical weapons were used in Ashrafia Sahnaya" "on a small scale against soldiers", but said they lacked primary information on the delivery system.

The victims were interviewed by the U.N. mission five days after the incident.

== See also ==
- Khan al-Assal chemical attack
- Ghouta chemical attack
- Jobar sarin attack
