= Qminas =

Qminas قميناس Qaminas, Kominas
- Village
- Location in Syria
- Coordinates: 35°53′05″N 36°40′42″E
- Country: Syria
- Governorate: Idlib
- District: Idlib
- Subdistrict: Idlib
- Time zone: UTC+2 (EET)
  - Summer (DST): UTC+3 (EEST)
- Climate: Csa

Qminas (Arabic: قميناس also spelled Qaminas or Kominas or Qmenas) is a village in northwestern Syria, administratively part of the Idlib Governorate, located 6 kilometers (3.7 mi) southeast of Idlib. Nearby localities include Sarmin to the northeast and Saraqib to the east. According to the Syria Central Bureau of Statistics, Qminas had a population of 2,722 in the 2004 census.
