= Global Public Policy Institute =

German think tank

The Global Public Policy Institute (GPPi) is a non-profit think tank based in Berlin. Established in 2003, the institute focuses on topics related to foreign policy and global governance.

== History ==
The Global Public Policy Institute was founded in October 2003 by Thorsten Benner, Wolfgang Reinicke, and Jan Martin Witte in Berlin. The organization was founded to conduct policy research and create political dialogue.

== Programs and Partnerships ==
GPPi has partnered and been supported by a number of organizations, foundations and academic institutions for its programs and projects.

The institute's Global Governance Futures - Multilateral Dialogues program has partnered with The Hertie School of Governance, Tsinghua University, Fudan University, The Tokyo Foundation, Keio University, Centre for Policy Research India, Ashoka University, The Brookings Institution and Woodrow Wilson School of Public and International Affairs. The program is supported by the Robert Bosch Stiftung.

The institute's Global Norm Evolution & Responsibility to Protect project focuses on research and debate related to the Responsibility to Protect. This project has partnered with Central European University, Fundação Getúlio Vargas, Jawaharlal Nehru University, University of Oxford, Peking University and Peace Research Institute Frankfurt. The project is supported by Volkswagen Foundation, Bank of Sweden Tercentenary Foundation and Compagnia di San Paolo.

== See also ==
- German Institute for International and Security Affairs
- German Council on Foreign Relations
- German Marshall Fund
