= Khan Shaykhun =

Khan Shaykhun خَان شَيْخُون
- Town
- Location in Syria
- Coordinates: 35°26′20″N 36°39′4″E
- Country: Syria
- Governorate: Idlib
- District: Maarrat al-Nu'man
- Subdistrict: Khan Shaykhun
- First settled: 20th century BC

Government
  - Mayor: Abdul Karim Najjar

Area
  - Total: 202.98 km^{2} (78.37 sq mi)
- Elevation: 350 m (1,150 ft)

Population (2004)
  - Total: 50,469
- Time zone: UTC+3 (EET)
  - Summer (DST): UTC+2 (EEST)
- Climate: BSk

Khan Shaykhun (Arabic: خَان شَيْخُون, romanized: Khān Shaykhūn) is a town in the Maarrat al-Nu'man District, within the southern Idlib Governorate of northwestern Syria.

Khan Shaykhun is located at an altitude of 350 meters on the main highway between Aleppo and Damascus. The local economy is primarily agricultural, focusing on the growing of cotton and cereals. The town was formerly known for producing embroidery. Nearby localities include Hbit to the west, Kafr Zita to southwest, Murak to the south and Al-Tamanah to the east.

The city was first settled in the 20th century BC during the Bronze and Iron Ages and had multiple civilisations, of which at least 4 are confirmed through excavations done by the French in 1932. The ancient civilisations range from Assyria Empire, Neo-Babylonian Empire, Achaemenid Empire to other, older empires. In the 2004 census, the population was recorded at 50,469. During the Syrian Civil War, this number doubled due to the waves of refugees the city experienced. However, many of its original inhabitants, as well as the refugees, left the city as a result of the intense bombardments it was subjected to.

== History ==
Khan Shaykhun takes its name from a 14th-century khan or caravanserai built by the Mamluk emir Sayf al-Din Shaykhu al-'Umari. The town grew up around the khan and is situated below a prominent tell, where excavations carried out in 1930 under the French Comte du Mesnil du Buisson revealed evidence of habitation dating back to the 20th century BC. The tell, which measures about 200–250 m long by 18–24 m high, was levelled off in the Bronze and Iron Ages to provide a platform for a series of walled towns built successively on top of each other. The second of these, dating to about 700 BC, has been identified as the Assyrian town of Ashkhani. The site was abandoned around 300 BC. The tell has also been proposed as the site of Ugulzat, the capital city of the kingdom of Nuhašše during the Late Bronze Age.

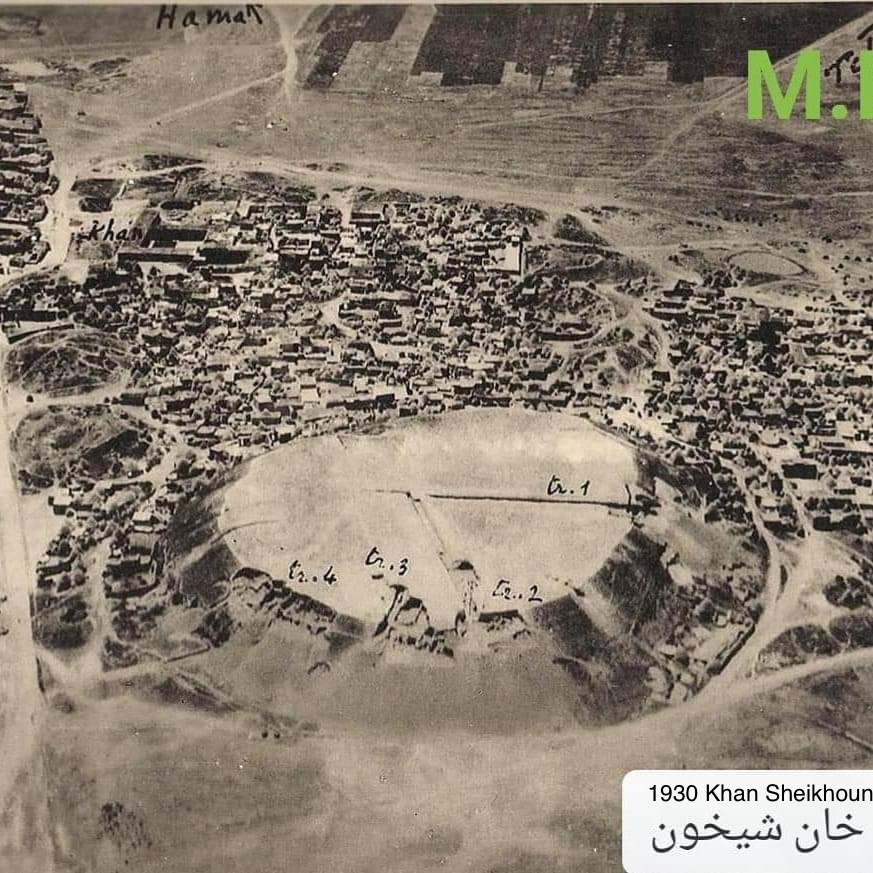
Khan Shaykhun in 1930

In more recent times, Khan Shaykhun was noted for its beehive houses, an architectural style found across the Levant and probably exported from there to North Africa.

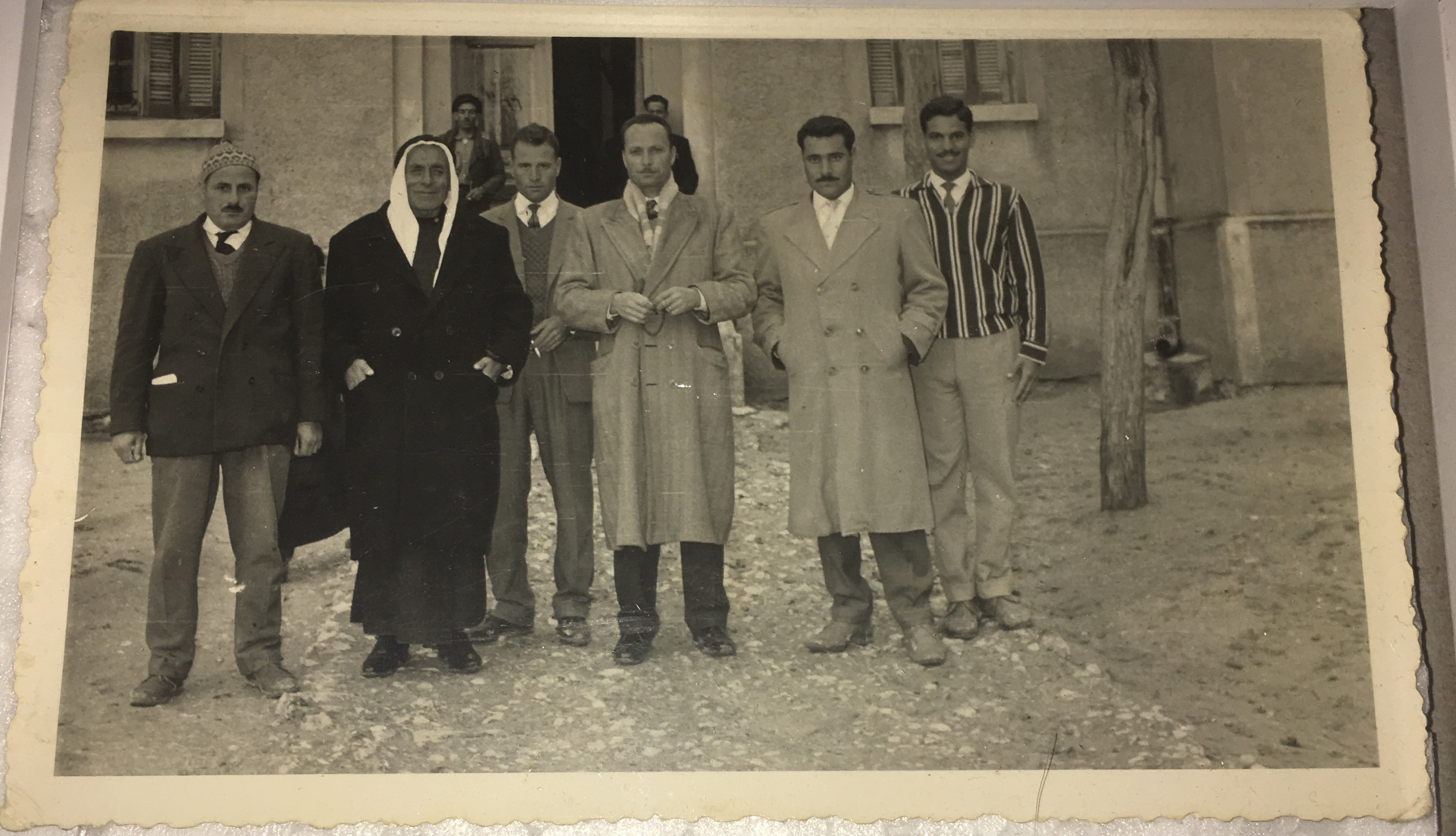
Majed Abdulkader Al Kutaini (middle, with scarf), former mayor of Khan Shaykhun from 1950 until 1975

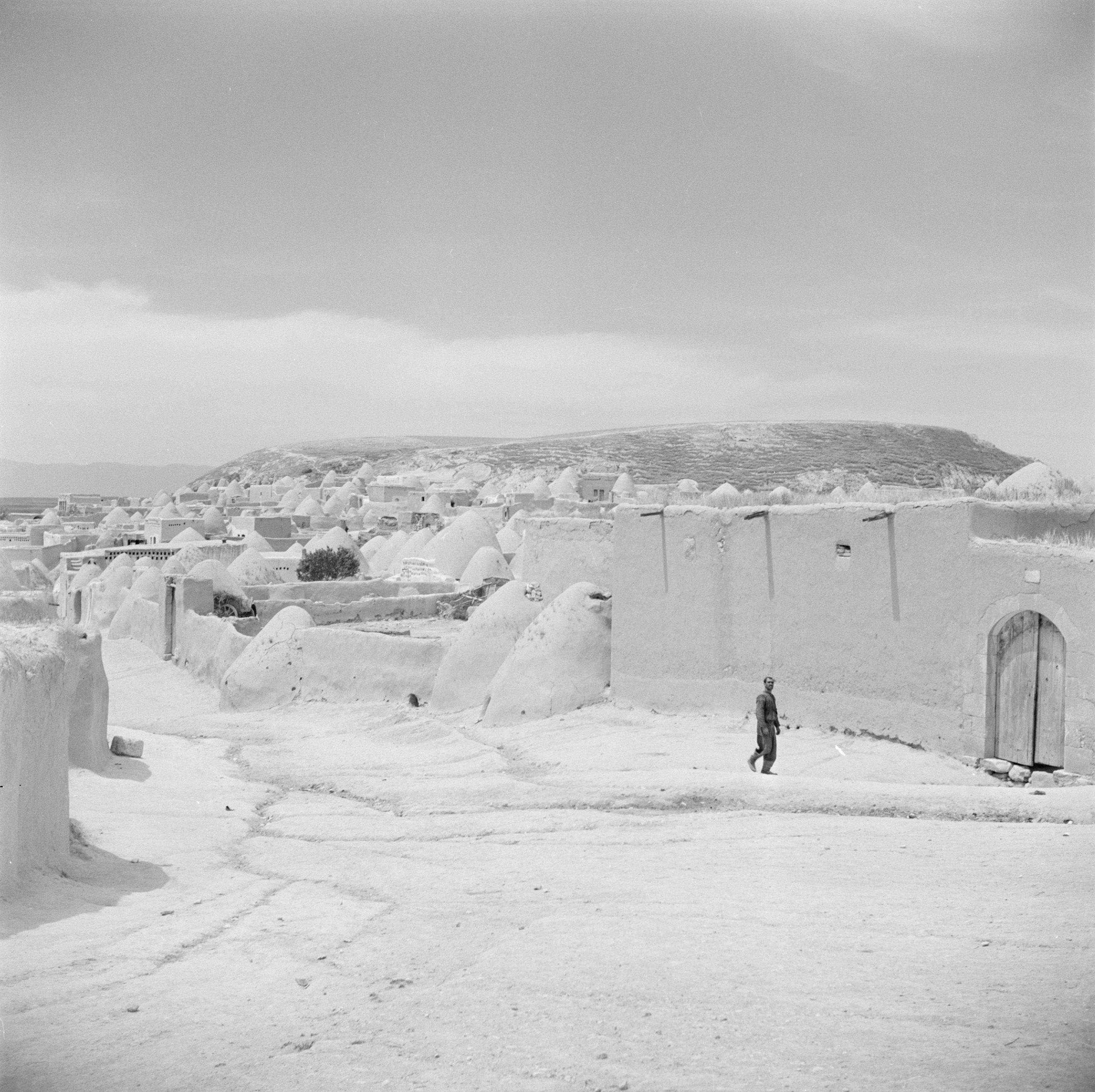
Khan Sheikhoun's famous beehive houses, 1950

== Geography ==
The city of Khan Shaykhun is part of the Maarat al-Numan district in the southern countryside of Idlib and is administratively linked to the Idlib Governorate in northwestern Syria. It is located 35 kilometers from Hama, 100 kilometers from Aleppo, and 70 kilometers from Idlib.

The city holds strategic importance, as it serves as a connection between the northern countryside of Hama and the southern countryside of Idlib. Additionally, it is situated on the international highway that connects Aleppo with Damascus.

The climate of Khan Shaykhun is warm and temperate. Rainfall occurs mainly in winter, with relatively little precipitation in the summer. The average annual temperature is 17.6 °C, and the yearly rainfall averages 379 mm. The residents of Khan Shaykhun primarily rely on trade and agriculture for their livelihood. The city has commerce in automobiles and grain, and crops such as olives, pistachios, wheat, and potatoes are cultivated.

Volleyball is the most popular sport in Khan Shaykhun. The city's volleyball club has achieved excellent rankings and competes in the top league. In 2007, it placed third in Syria. The city also has a football club that secured promotion to the Syrian Premier League for the first time ever in 2025.

== Personalities ==
Khan Shaykhun is distinguished by a strong family structure, which includes notable families such as Al-Najm, Al-Dyoub, Al-Halawa, Abed, Biserini, Al-Kutaini, Al-Mawas, Al-Youssef, Al-Sarmani, Al-Sawadi, and Al-Khattab. The city is also known as the birthplace of the poet and scholar Abu al-Huda al-Sayyadi.

Over the years, Khan Shaykhun has produced many prominent figures, including politicians, intellectuals, and significant individuals in the fields of science, administration, and the military. Former mayor Majed Abdulkader Al Kutaini, who was born in the city in 1917, studied there and in the city of Hama. He held the position of mayor from 1950 to 1975. During his tenure, he played a vital role in the organization and management of the city. He was known for his humility, his love for the city's residents, and his constant willingness to help.

== Climate ==
The current atmospheric condition in Khan Shaykhun is recognised as a regional steppe climate. There is not much rainfall in Khan Shaykhun all year long. The climate is classified as BSh according to Köppen and Geiger.

Climate data for Khan Shaykhun
| Month | Jan | Feb | Mar | Apr | May | Jun | Jul | Aug | Sep | Oct | Nov | Dec | Year |
|---|---|---|---|---|---|---|---|---|---|---|---|---|---|
| Mean daily maximum °C (°F) | 12.4 (54.4) | 14.5 (58.1) | 18.6 (65.4) | 23.1 (73.5) | 28.0 (82.5) | 32.3 (90.1) | 34.9 (94.9) | 35.3 (95.5) | 32.4 (90.3) | 27.4 (81.3) | 19.9 (67.8) | 14.0 (57.2) | 25.65 (78.17) |
| Daily mean °C (°F) | 7.4 (45.3) | 9.1 (48.4) | 12.6 (54.7) | 16.7 (62.1) | 21.3 (70.3) | 25.2 (77.4) | 27.7 (81.8) | 27.9 (82.2) | 25.2 (77.3) | 20.8 (69.5) | 13.9 (57.1) | 8.8 (47.9) | 19.63 (67.34) |
| Mean daily minimum °C (°F) | 3.0 (37.3) | 4.3 (39.7) | 6.9 (44.5) | 10.4 (50.8) | 14.3 (57.8) | 18.1 (64.6) | 20.7 (69.2) | 21.2 (70.2) | 18.7 (65.7) | 15.1 (59.1) | 8.9 (48.0) | 4.5 (40.1) | 12.81 (55.06) |
| Average precipitation cm (inches) | 52 (2) | 44 (1) | 33 (1) | 20 (0) | 14 (0) | 0 (0) | 0 (0) | 0 (0) | 3 (0) | 12 (0) | 26 (1) | 45 (1) | 249 (6) |
| Average relative humidity (%) | 76 | 71 | 63 | 57 | 52 | 48 | 51 | 53 | 53 | 53 | 58 | 71 | 59 |
Source: Climate-Data.org

== Syrian Civil War ==
During the Syrian Civil War, the town initially fell under control of the Syrian opposition, and later, in 2014 fell to Jabhat al-Nusra. In 2017, Deutsche Welle reported: "Idlib province, where Khan Sheikhun is located, is mostly controlled by the Tahrir al-Sham alliance, which is dominated by Jabhat Fateh al-Sham, formerly known as the al-Qaeda-affiliated al-Nusra Front."

On 4 April 2017, the town came under a heavy air attack, using chemical weapons. 92 people were killed and several hundred injured. After a few months of relative calm, the town was bombed again in September 2017 by Russian jets. Jets believed to belong to the Russian Air Force destroyed the town's power plant, which feeds northern Hama and southern Idlib. The al-Rahma clinic was also struck.

On 27 February 2018, pro-government media reported that Tahrir al-Sham withdrew from the city of Khan Shaykhun, and was expelled from western Aleppo by other rebel groups. In mid-April 2018, pro-opposition media reported that Tahrir al-Sham once again seized the town, which had been devoid of rebel military presence. In August 2018, the town again came under aerial bombardment by pro-government forces. By 2019, almost all of the town's residents had abandoned it.

On 19 August 2019, the Syrian Army was reported to have taken control of the city's eastern and northern districts. The next day, the Syrian Observatory for Human Rights reported that rebel and Islamist factions and jihadist groups withdrew from Khan Shaykhun completely. On 21 August 2019, the Syrian Army fully secured the town after capturing the strategic hill of Tell al-Tara and Al-Khazanat Camp in southern Idlib.

On 29 November 2024, the city was recaptured by the Syrian Salvation Government led by Tahrir al-Sham.

== Sources ==
- Pfälzner, Peter (2012). "Levantine Kingdoms of the Late Bronze Age". In Potts, Daniel T. (ed.). A Companion to the Archaeology of the Ancient Near East. Vol. 1. John Wiley & Sons. ISBN 978-1-4443-6077-6.
