= Conflict Armament Research =

UK-based investigative organization that tracks weapons supply

- Website type: Peace and conflict studies
- Available in: English
- Headquarters: {{{location_country}}}
- Website: conflictarm.com
- Launched: 2011; 15 years ago

Conflict Armament Research (CAR) is a British-based investigative organization that tracks the supply of conventional weapons, ammunition, and related military materiel (such as IEDs) into conflict-affected areas. Established in 2011, CAR specializes in working with governments to find out how weapons end up in war zones, and in the hands of terrorists and insurgent groups.

The group maintains the iTrace Global Weapon Reporting system, which is funded by the EU and the Government of Germany. CAR also provides technical support services including training and capacity-building.

== Areas of Work ==
=== Investigations ===
CAR works around the world using weapons tracking methods in over 30 countries. Teams work with national security and defence forces to document weapons at the point of use, and track their sources back through the chain of supply. Investigators photograph all markings and distinguishing characteristics, GPS-record all recovery sites and use in-field interviews with local stakeholders to build a case for each item documented. CAR does not rely on photographs sourced from social media. Their main priority are in countries such as Syria, South Sudan, Iraq, Libya and Somalia. CAR also has many partnerships with different agencies, trusts and governments such as UNMAS, Ministry of Foreign Affairs, Foreign and Commonwealth Office, UNSCAR, European Union External Action, German Cooperation, UK Aid, European Commission, United States Department of State and UNIDIR.

All verified data is uploaded to CAR's iTrace system. Data is used to map the global chain of supply of arms, from the place of manufacture, to the point of capture or recovery.

== Reporting ==
=== Iraq and Syria ===
In December 2017, CAR published a report documenting more than 40,000 items recovered from Islamic State (IS) forces between 2014 and 2017. The group reported that the majority of arms and ammunition were originally made in China and Russia, with almost a third of recovered weapons having first been produced by EU member states that were former Warsaw Pact countries.

Some of these items had been re-exported by the US and Saudi Arabia to Syrian opposition groups before ending up in IS hands. CAR found that one Bulgarian-made anti-tank missile sold to the US Army made its way to IS forces in just 59 days.

The report also found that IS "has been able to manufacture their own weapons and IEDs on an industrial scale thanks to a robust chain of supply." Turkish territory was the main, but not only, source of chemical explosive precursors for IEDs made by IS.

CAR has also documented attempts by IS forces to develop weaponised drones, including a visit to a drone workshop in Ramadi, Iraq.

=== Yemen ===
CAR has provided information on how rebel groups in Yemen are getting weapons, including assault rifles and anti-tank guided weapons that were seized from dhows in February and March 2016 by Combined Maritime Forces, and that were "suspected to have originated in Iran and were destined for Somalia and Yemen."

In December 2017, CAR reported on a remote-controlled 'drone boat' that had been reportedly seized in Yemen's coastal waters, providing a breakdown of how the water-borne IED had been constructed.

From the beginning of the Yemen conflicts, Houthi forces have deployed increasingly intelligent weapon and surveillance systems against their enemies such as unmanned aerial vehicles (UAVs). They are used to target and identify Saudi Arabian coalition missile defense systems which can be referred to kamikaze drone attacks.

Between October 2016 through February 2017 the Conflict Armament Research investigation team located and documented more than seven UAVs in which the United Arab Emirates were in possession of. On February 26, 2017, Houthi forces presented four types of UAVs in which they designed and manufactured themselves. In one of the seven UAVs that the Conflict Armament Research investigation team discovered, the Qasef (Striker 1), was identical to the four UAVs that the Houthi forces had displayed. Upon this discovery, the CAR investigation team concluded that Houthi forces were not the ones producing these UAVs, in fact they predicted that the United Arab Emirates were the ones designing and manufacturing them.

=== Sudan and South Sudan ===
Reports from CAR show that despite active UN and EU arms embargoes, the Sudanese government has continued to import military and dual-use goods, some of which it has used in the conflict in South Kordofan and Blue Nile state.

Sudan has used foreign imports to build up its own domestic production capabilities. CAR says that since 2014 newly manufactured Sudanese military materiel has been found in the hands of armed groups in South Sudan, Central African Republic, Côte d'Ivoire, Libya, Mali, and Niger.

In 2015 CAR reported that South Sudan's military has seized a stash of weapons that may have been supplied to a rebel group by Khartoum, which says it is not involved in the conflict.

Research from the CAR investigation team discovered that there were a small number of international weapons and defense systems suppliers that were traced to the Sudan People's Liberation Army including China, Israel, Ukraine and the United Arab Emirates.

In contrast to their findings the South Sudan's Government and the Sudan People's Liberation Army argued that there have been no evidence of new shipments of weapons and ammunition from China or Israel since December, 2013.

They apparently have been relying on old weapons and ammunition that have cycled among civilians and throughout the county and neighboring countries. Since 2014 the CAR investigation team have documented that China had supplied 99% of ammunition and 37% of weapons that have cycled through multiple African conflicts, especially in South Sudan. 5% of the documented weapons that were found by the Car investigation team in South Sudan were Israeli made, and had markings on the weapons that were labeled ISB and NSS, which indicates that they were originally intended for the International Security Bureau of the National Security Service.

These findings support the hypothesis conducted by the CAR investigation team that there was a third party from those countries that were trying to smuggle weapons and ammunition into South Sudan.

=== The Sahel ===
Based on field investigations carried out in eight countries during 2015 and early 2016, CAR found evidence of widespread circulation of illicit arms between armed groups in West Africa. The group documented how weapons looted or leaked from Libyan stockpiles after the civil war in 2011 had fuelled armed actors in Central African Republic, Chad, Côte d'Ivoire, Mali, Niger, and Syria.

CAR also discovered a new set of weapons used in a series of attacks against hotels and security forces by Islamist armed groups in the Sahel that were "unlike any previously documented in the sub-region." These matched with weapons found in Iraq and Syria, and suggest, according to CAR, possible links in supply sources between groups active in Iraq and Syria and in West Africa.

Throughout six different countries in Africa and the middle east CAR documented weapons that had a high chance of originating in the Libyan stockpiles. The weapons that were documented were Russian manufactured SA-7b MANPADS, North Korean manufactured 40 mm F7 type rockets m79 90 HEAT rockets, Polish style assault rifles, and Belgium and French style assault rifles. Outside of Libya there has been an increased weapon and ammunition flow that has been traveling into the Sahel region which has been increasing the armed violence in Sahel. Some of the weaponry that has been flowing into Sahel are Sudanese small arms ammunition that has been cycling through Southern Libya and Mali, Russian and Chinese small arm ammunition, and ammunition that have been used by Islamist combatants.

==== Mali ====
Joint investigations by CAR and the Small Arms Survey in Mali following the Tuareg rebellion in 2012 identified a range of weapons, ammunition, and related materiel in the hands of various armed groups. Armed groups in Mali have received supplies sourced from Libya and captured from military stockpiles in Mali. Weapons confiscated from armed groups in northern Mali include 7.62 x 39 mm to 14.5 x 114 mm calibre ammunition, mortar rounds, rocket-propelled grenades, and air-to-ground rockets.

Between 2012 and 2013 CAR reported and identified 41 different types of weapons and ammunition types from small caliber ammunition and small arms weapons, light weapons and light ammunition, mortars, rockets, IED's and grenades. There were also larger conventional weapons such as rocket launchers, cannons, grenade launchers and launch rocket systems. Armored military vehicles were also documented in Northern Mali by the CAR investigation team but it is unknown to them where the vehicles came from.

==== Central African Republic ====
Between April and September 2014 the Conflict Armament Research investigation team conducted a six-month field investigation that presented identifications of weapons, ammunition and armed vehicles that were used by non state armed groups that happened to be located within the Central African Republic. These materials were supplied to the Seleka rebel forces from Sudan and also European suppliers.

The group have reported on weapons and ammunition used in the Central African Republic on all sides. Stockpiles held by the Séléka included small arms produced in Sudan and China.

== Publications ==
=== Reports ===
Weapon supplies into South Sudan's civil war: A three-year investigation on how military equipment has reached all aspects of the civil war.

Weapons of the Islamic State: A three-year investigation that was conducted in Iraq and Syria that focused on the Islamic supply chains. Between 2014 and 2017 more than 40,000 items including improvised explosive devices (IED), ammunition and weapons have been recovered from those areas.

Sudanese stockpiles and regional weapon diversion: Sudan People's Liberation Army were investigated and analyzed because they were in possession of captured equipment recovered by CAR.

Investigation of cross-border weapon transfers in the Sahel: A ten-month investigation that was conducted in over eight countries and uncovered sources of weapons for armed groups and also different trafficking routes for weapon transfers.

Tracing the supply of components used in Islamic State IEDs. A 20-month investigation that was conducted in Iraq and Syria and uncovered over 700 components to manufacture improvised explosive devices.

Non-state armed groups in the Central African Republic: A six-month investigation that different types and sources of weapons, ammunition and military vehicles in the Central African Republic.

Distribution of Iranian ammunition in Africa: A six-year collaborative investigation which portrays evidence of Iranian ammunition distributed in nine different African countries. Supplies were distributed to rebel forces, foreign insurgents, Islamist armed groups and different civilian communities.

Rebel forces in Northern Mali: A one-year investigation that documented 41 different types of weapons, ammunition and military vehicles that were supplied to the rebel forces in Northern Mali.

Weapons of the war in Ukraine: A three-year investigation of weapon supplies into Donetsk and Luhansk.

=== Dispatches ===
- Weapons of the Islamic State (December 2017)
- New Sudanese weapons in Blue Nile state (April 2017)
- Standardisation and quality control in Islamic State's military production (December 2016)
- Maritime interdictions of weapon supplies to Somalia and Yemen (November 2016)
- Weapons and ammunition airdropped to SPLA-iO forces in South Sudan (June 2015)
- Islamic State weapons in Kobane (April 2015)
- Islamic State ammunition in Iraq and Syria (October 2014)
- Islamic State weapons in Iraq and Syria (September 2014)

=== Guides ===
- Warsaw Pact-calibre ammunition quantity tables
- Russian MANPADs technology
- Warsaw Pact-calibre ammunition box marking
- Identifying marks on Kalashnikov-pattern weapons

=== Field perspectives ===
- Anatomy of a ‘drone boat’ (December 2017)
- Islamic State's multi-role IEDs (April 2017)
- Iranian technology transfers to Yemen (March 2017)
- Islamic State's weaponised drones
- Inside Islamic State's improvised weapon factories in Fallujah
- Turkish fertilisers used in Islamic State IEDs in Iraq

== See also ==
- Arms control
- Arms trafficking
- Arms Trade Treaty
- Institute for Science and International Security – similar US organisation
- Small Arms and Light Weapons
- United Nations Office for Disarmament Affairs
