= Jobar chemical attacks =

- Part of the Syrian civil war
- Location: Jobar, Damascus, Syria
- Date: April 2013
- Deaths: unknown

The Jobar chemical attacks allegedly occurred in Jobar, Damascus, Syria, in April 2013. A reporter and a photographer for the French newspaper Le Monde spent two months in Jobar reporting on the attacks. However, the U.N. mission which investigated the attack could not find "sufficient or credible information" to support the allegation.

Syrian rebels claimed the government used chemical weapons in Jobar in early April. Le Monde reported that gas attacks on the rebels occurred regularly in April and that Free Syrian Army fighters carried gas masks and had syringes with doses of atropine, the antidote of sarin. Chemical weapons expert Jean Pascal Zanders expressed doubt that the events described in Jobar could have involved sarin, saying that sarin victims would not have survived the lengthy journey to the hospital described by the newspaper.

On April 14, a doctor at the Islamic hospital in Hammuriya interviewed by Le Monde said that earlier in the day he had given an attack victim 15 shots of atropine and some hydrocortisone. While Zanders replied that the treatment could have killed the patient.

Le Monde reported "injured fighters were lying beside five medical workers who had been contaminated by contact with the affected men" and that the hospital's director lost consciousness after working alongside casualties for an hour. The newspaper also said that "according to a well-informed Western source, the Syrian authorities have gone so far as to use mixtures of chemicals, notably with the addition of tear gas, to make it harder to identify the source of the symptoms."

== Investigations ==
In June 2013, the French government told the United Nations that it had evidence of a sarin attack in Jobar between 12 and 14 April. After the August 21st Ghouta chemical attack, French intelligence released a report that said samples from those attacks had confirmed the use of sarin. However, the U.N. fact-finding mission which investigated the alleged attack did not receive "sufficient or credible information" to support the allegation.

== See also ==
- Use of chemical weapons in the Syrian Civil War
