= Jobar sarin attack =

- Part of the Syrian Civil War
- Type: Sarin attack
- Location: Jobar, Rif Dimashq Governorate, Syria; 33°31′52″N 36°20′14″E
- Date: 24 August 2013 around 11:00 (UTC+03:00)
- Casualties: 24 injured
- Location of Jobar within Syria

The Jobar sarin attack took place on 24 August 2013 around 11:00 in Jobar, a suburb of the Syrian capital city Damascus.

== Background ==
Jobar is a suburb of Syria's capital city Damascus. The suburb is located approximately 3 kilometers (1.9 mi) northeast of the Damascus city center.

== Attack ==
On 24 August 2013, a group of Syrian Army soldiers were clearing buildings from opposition forces in Jobar. Around 11:00, the intensity of the shooting from the opposition side subsided and the soldiers believed the rebels were retreating. Then, an improvised explosive device detonated with a low noise about 10 meters from them. The IED reportedly released "a very badly smelling gas".

10 soldiers were injured and evacuated to the nearest medical point where they were treated with intravenous fluids and oxygen before being sent to Martyr Yusuf Al Azmah Military Hospital for further treatment. Four of them were severely affected. Another 20 soldiers came later with similar symptoms, but they were in stable condition and could, after some time, be sent back to their units. All patients received "atropine, HI-6, steroids, oxygen therapy and fluids treatment."

== Aftermath ==
The UN mission received soil samples from the impact site and remnants of two IEDs allegedly used to disperse the chemical agent. The soil samples tested positive for sarin. However, the UN mission "could not verify the chain of custody for this sampling and subsequent analysis". On 30 August 2013, the UN mission visited the affected soldiers at a military hospital.

== See also ==
- Khan al-Assal chemical attack
- Jobar chemical attacks
- Ghouta chemical attack
- Ashrafiyat Sahnaya chemical attack
