= United Nations Security Council Resolution 2209 =

UN Security Council Resolution 2209
- Date: 6 March 2015
- Meeting no.: 7401
- Code: S/RES/2209 (Document)
- Subject: The situation the Middle East
- Voting summary: 14 voted for; None voted against; 1 abstained; None absent
- Result: Adopted

Security Council composition
- Permanent members: China; France; Russia; United Kingdom; United States
- Non-permanent members: Angola; Chad; Chile; Jordan; Lithuania; Malaysia; New Zealand; Nigeria; Spain; Venezuela

The United Nations Security Council Resolution 2209 condemns any use of chemicals as a weapon in the Syrian Civil War and threatens to use force if chemical weapons are used again in the conflict. The resolution was passed with 14 in favor with one abstention from Venezuela.
