= Otaybah, Syria =

Otaybah قرية العتيبة
- Village
- Location within Syria
- Coordinates: 33°29′10″N 36°36′4″E
- Country: Syria
- Governorate: Rif Dimashq Governorate
- District: Douma District
- Subdistrict: al-Nashabiyah

Population (2004)
  - Total: 10,548
- Time zone: UTC+2 (EET)
  - Summer (DST): UTC+3 (EEST)
- City Qrya Pcode: C2348

Otaybah (Arabic: قرية العتيبة, sometimes spelled Ataybah, Uteibah, Ateibeh, al-Utayba, al-Otaiba or al-Atebeh) is a village in eastern Ghouta, Syria, 26 kilometers (16 mi) east of Damascus city center. The village is administratively a part of the Douma District in the Rif Dimashq Governorate. Damascus International Airport is located 11 kilometers (6.8 mi) southwest of Otaybah. According to the Syria Central Bureau of Statistics (CBS), Otaybah had a population of 10,548 people in the 2004 census.
