= Al-Tamanah =

Al-Tamanah التَّمَانْعَة
- Location in Syria
- Coordinates: 35°27′24″N 36°44′47″E
- Country: Syria
- Governorate: Idlib Governorate
- District: Maarrat al-Nu'man
- Subdistrict: al-Tamanah Subdistrict

Population (2004)
  - Total: 7,382

Al-Tamanah (Arabic: التَّمَانْعَة, romanized: at-Tamānʿah, sometimes spelled al-Taman'ah, al-Tamana’a or al-Teman’a) is a town in northwestern Syria, administratively a part of the Maarrat al-Nu'man District of the Idlib Governorate. According to the Syria Central Bureau of Statistics, al-Tamanah had a population of 7,382 in the 2004 census. Al-Tamanah is located 9 kilometers (5.6 mi) east of Khan Shaykhun and 16 kilometers (9.9 mi) northeast of Kafr Zita.
