= Tell Mannas =

Tell Mannas بلدة تلمنس
- Location in Syria
- Coordinates: 35°38′28″N 36°44′6″E
- Country: Syria
- Governorate: Idlib Governorate
- District: Maarrat al-Nu'man

Population (2004)
  - Total: 11,359

Tell Mannas (Arabic: بلدة تلمنس), sometimes spelled Telminnes, Tal Minnis, Talmanis, Talmanes or Telmans, is a village 5 kilometers (3.1 mi) east of Maarrat al-Nu'man. The village is administratively a part of the Maarrat al-Nu'man District in the Idlib Governorate. According to the Syria Central Bureau of Statistics (CBS), Tell Mannas had a population of 11,359 in the 2004 census.

== History ==
During the late Umayyad period, the olive groves of Tall Mannas were used by the troops of Caliph Marwan II to ambush the rebel Umayyad prince Sulayman ibn Hisham as he passed through the area. In the early 9th century, Tall Mannas was controlled by the Tanukhids under their chieftain al-Hawari ibn Hittin, during their rebellion against the Abbasid princely family, the Banu Salih. Tall Mannas was used a residence by the Abbasid caliph al-Mutawakkil when he visited the area in 858. It was described by local geographer Yaqut al-Hamawi as a fortress near Ma'arrat al-Nu'man.

In 1079, the Tutush I of Damascus besieged but failed to capture Tall Mannas during his campaign in northern Syria. Later, in 1098/97 Tall Mannas was inhabited by Christian community of Oriental Orthodox Syriacs and its inhabitants gave safe haven and assistance to the Crusaders under Raymond Pilet of Antioch during their failed siege of Ma'arrat al-Nu'man. Some months later, Ma'arrat al-Nu'man was captured and its entire population massacred by the Crusaders.

== Bibliography ==
- Cobb, Paul M. (2001). White Banners: Contention in 'Abbasid Syria, 750-880. SUNY Press. ISBN 9780791448809.
- Honigman, E. (1934). "Ma'arrat al-Nu'man". The Encyclopædia of Islam: A Dictionary of the Geography, Ethnography and Biography of the Muhammadan Peoples, Volume 3. L-R. Leiden: E. J. Brill. pp. 59–62. ISBN 9004097910.
- Riley-Smith, Jonathan (1993). The First Crusade and Idea of Crusading. The Athlone Press. ISBN 9780826467263.
- Strange, le, Guy (1890). Palestine Under the Moslems: A Description of Syria and the Holy Land from A.D. 650 to 1500. Committee of the Palestine Exploration Fund.
- Al-Tabari (1985). Williams, John Alden (ed.). The History of al-Tabari Vol. 27: The 'Abbasid Revolution. Albany: State University of New York Press. ISBN 0-87395-884-5.
