= List of massacres in Syria =

The following is a list of massacres that have occurred in Syria.

== Ottoman Empire ==
Name	Date	Location	Deaths	Perpetrators	Notes
Massacre of the Telal	1517	Aleppo	9,400	Turkish soldiers upon Selim I's order	Fatwas issued against the Nusayris (or 'Alawites') that declared them infidels. Around 9,400 Nusayris who assembled in Aleppo were all executed.
Tafas massacre	27 September 1918	Tafas	250	Ottoman Empire	Massacre from the retreating Ottoman Army against Arabic civilians

== Syrian Republic/Arab Republic ==
Name	Date	Location	Deaths	Perpetrators	Notes
1947 Aleppo pogrom	December 1947	Aleppo	75	Syrian state and Arab population of Aleppo	Half the city's Jewish population fled.
1949 Menarsha synagogue bombing	August 5, 1949	Damascus	13	Arab Redemption Suicide Phalange	Attackers threw grenades into the synagogue during Shabbat services, killing 13 (including 8 children) and wounding 32.

== Syrian Arab Republic ==
=== Muslim Brotherhood Uprising in Syria ===
Name	Date	Location	Deaths	Perpetrators	Notes
Aleppo Artillery School massacre	16 June 1979	Aleppo	83-110	Muslim Brotherhood of Syria (Fighting Vanguard)	The Fighting Vanguard, led by an officer on duty in the Artillery School, infiltrated the school and committed a sectarian massacre of Alawite army cadets.
Jisr al-Shughour massacre (1980)	9 March 1980	Jisr al-Shughour	150–200	Ba'athist Syria	Syrian Army violently suppresses of Islamist insurrection through shelling and summary executions.
Siege of Aleppo (1980)	1 April 1980 – February 1981	Aleppo	1,000–2,000	Syrian Army	Multiple massacres over a period of time, including in clashes, summary executions, or at random. The Muslim Brotherhood also killed an estimated 300 people in assassinations and terrorist attacks targeting Ba'athist government employees, military officers, and civilians.
Tadmor Prison massacre	27 June 1980	Palmyra	500–1,000	Ba'athist Defense Companies	In retaliation for an attempted assassination of Hafez al-Assad by the Muslim Brotherhood, Rifaat Al-Assad and his Defense Companies summarily executed hundreds of prisoners affiliated with the Brotherhood in Tadmor prison.
1981 Hama massacre	April 1981	Hama	400	Ba'athist Syria	Members of the male population rounded up and executed.
1981 Damascus car bomb attacks	August 1981 – November, 1981	Damascus	"hundreds"	Muslim Brotherhood of Syria	Three car bomb attacks in the Syrian capital killed "hundreds", according to Syrian state media. The deaths included members of the UN Disengagement Observer Force.
1982 Hama massacre	February 1982	Hama	Estimates vary. 2,000–40,000	Syrian Army & Defense Companies	Siege, bombardment, summary executions and forced disappearances in the Syrian city of Hama, then under the control of the Muslim Brotherhood.

=== Syrian Civil War ===
Name	Date	Location	Deaths	Perpetrators	Notes
May 2011 Homs massacre	6-29 May 2011	Homs	58	Syrian government forces	Syrian Army and security forces allegedly killed 58 civilian protesters in Homs during the month of May in 2011 in Homs.
2011 Jisr al-Shughur Massacre	4-12 June 2011	Jisr al-Shughur, Idlib Governorate	100+	Armed insurgents/Rebels	Between 4 and 12 June 2011, clashes between Syrian security forces and insurgents in Jisr al-Shughur left over a hundred dead. Both civilians and soldiers were reportedly killed in clashes in the center of town. In the aftermath, bodies full of Syrian soldiers and security forces summarily executed were discovered in a mass grave at the local security branch. Pro-opposition sources originally claimed that they were defectors executed by the Syrian government for refusing to shoot at protesters; the government blamed the killings on armed insurgents. The opposition claim was met with skepticism at the time by various observers on Syria until journalist Rania Abouzeid produced a detailed investigation revealing the truth behind the incident, uncovering that the mass execution of soldiers was the work of insurgents.
December 2011 Jabal al-Zawiya massacres	19–20 December 2011	Jabal Zawiya	120	Syrian Army	120 Syrian Army defectors allegedly massacred by the government.
Karm al-Zeitoun massacre	9 March 2012	Karm al-Zeitoun, Homs	47	Syrian Army	Syrian Army reportedly massacred 47 people after entering Karm al-Zeitoun.
Taftanaz massacre	5 April 2012	Taftanaz, Idlib Governorate	62	Syrian Army	Syrian Army reportedly carried out a massacre by rounding up and executing people following the Battle of Taftanaz.
Houla massacre	25 May 2012	Houla	108	Disputed (see notes)	49 children among the dead. Various international media outlets reported that the Syrian government had committed the massacre based on witness/survivor testimonies. The UN concluded that Syrian government forces were responsible. However, after eyewitness accounts published by German paper Frankfurter Allgemeine Zeitung and Russian-affiliated outlet ANNA News gave contradicting accounts, claiming that it was the rebels who committed the massacre, and that the victims' families were warned by the rebels not to speak freely and publicly about the event. UNHRC later concluded that there was insufficient evidence to determine who had committed the massacre.
Al-Buwaida al-Sharqiya massacre	31 May 2012	Al-Buwaida al-Sharqiya	13	Syrian government forces	According to sources, 13 factory workers had been rounded up and shot dead by pro-government forces.
Al-Qubair massacre	6 June 2012	Al-Qubair, in Maarzaf	80–100	Pro-Assad militias	Victims were reportedly stabbed and shot according to eyewitnesses.
Daret Izzah massacre	22 June 2012	Darat Izza	25+	Rebels	Rebels committed a massacre of 25 men in the village of Darat Izza in the west Aleppo countryside. The Syrian government said the victims were "citizens" killed by "terrorists". The Rebels claimed that they killed 25 men who they accused of being part of a pro-Assad militia (Shabiha).
Siege of Hama	31 July – 4 August 2012	Hama	100–200	Syrian Army	Syrian government forces assaulted the city of Hama to crack down on the opposition, leading to the deaths of up to 200 civilians.
Darayya massacre	20–25 August 2012	Darayya, Rif Dimashq	320–500	Syrian Army or pro-Assad militias	Many people were killed in a five-day Army assault on the town, which the rebel army had surrendered. According to the opposition, Human Rights Watch and local residents the killings were committed by the Syrian military and Shabiha militiamen. According to the government and some other local residents, some of the killings were committed by rebel forces.
Saadallah al-Jabiri Square bombings	3 October 2012	Aleppo	40	Al-Nusra Front	At the start of the Battle of Aleppo, Islamist rebels from the Al-Nusra Front committed three suicide car bomb attacks in Aleppo's Saadallah Al-Jabiri Square, killing 40 people and wounding 122 others, mostly civilians.
Maarrat Al-Nu'man massacre	8 – 13 October 2012	Maarrat al-Nu'man	65	Syrian Army	During the Battle of Maarrat Al-Nu'man, the Syrian Army reportedly executed 65 people, including 50 defecting soldiers.
Aqrab massacre	11 December 2012	Aqrab, Hama Governorate	125—300 (Includes wounded)	Rebels (suspected)	An Alawite village attacked by Syrian rebels with bombs. Pro-opposition media and activists initially claimed the attack was perpetrated by the government. An investigation by Alex Thomson from Channel 4 News however, found that it was likely perpetrated by the rebels.
Basatin al-Hasawiya massacre	15 January 2013	Homs	106	Syrian Army	Syrian government troops stormed the village of Basatin al-Hasawiya on the outskirts of Homs city, reportedly killing 106 civilians, according to opposition activists.
Queiq River massacre	29 January–14 March 2013	Queiq River, Aleppo	147–230	Syrian Army or Pro-Assad militias (suspected, per HRW)	Between 29 January and 14 March 2013, residents and activists in the rebel-controlled neighborhood of Bustan al-Qasr in Aleppo found 230 bodies of young males on the banks and in the Queiq river in Aleppo. The victims bodies appear to show their hands tied behind their back and summarily executed. Opposition activists accused government forces of being behind the executions since the bodies allegedly came down the river from the direction of government-held areas of the city. In its investigation, Human Rights Watch successfully identified the names of at least 147 victims, all male and aged between 11 and 64, but did not assign definitive blame. It did however, assert a high likelihood that they occurred in government-held areas based on where most of the victims were last seen. The Syrian government denied responsibility, blaming the massacre instead on Al-Qaeda.
Khan al-Asal chemical attack	19 March 2013	Khan al-Asal, Aleppo Governorate, Syria	26	Disputed (see notes)	In the early morning of 19 March 2013, projectiles containing sarin landed in Khan al-Asal, a town on the southwestern frontline of the Battle of Aleppo. According to the opposition monitor group SOHR, 26 people were killed, and more than 86 were wounded. The government and the rebels traded blame for the attack, though the SOHR said that 16 government soldiers were among the victims. This led analysts to suspect that the rebels were responsible. Russia blamed the rebels for the chemical attack, while the US blamed the Syrian government. One top UN investigator later claimed that the rebels likely committed the attack, though the UN later said it had not yet definitively assign blame. An attempted UN investigation into the incident in August 2013 was disrupted after the far more deadly Ghouta chemical attacks occurred on 21 August 2013, two days after UN investigators arrived to the country.
Tadamon massacre	16 April 2013	Tadamon, Damascus, Syria	41-280+	Syrian Army	The Tadamon massacre happened in April 2013 in the Tadamon district of Damascus during the Syrian civil war. Syrian soldiers from Military Intelligence 227 killed 41 civilians near the Ottoman Mosque. The victims were executed and buried in mass graves.
Battle of Jdaidet al-Fadl	16–21 April 2013	Rif Dimashq	100–300	Syrian Army	Syrian Army was accused by the opposition of carrying out a massacre. SOHR claimed that 250 people were killed since the start of the battle, with them being able to document, by name, 127 of the dead, including 27 rebels. Another opposition claim put the death toll at 450. One activist source claimed he counted 98 bodies in the town's streets and 86 in makeshift clinics who were summarily executed. Another activist stated they documented 85 people who were executed, including 28 who were killed in a makeshift hospital.
Bayda and Baniyas massacres	2–3 May 2013	Bayda and Baniyas, Tartus Governorate	128–450	Pro-Assad militias	Massacre by Alawite militias against the local Sunni population.
Hatla massacre	11 June 2013	Hatla, Deir el-Zour	60	Rebels	Shiite villagers killed by Syrian rebels.
Khan al-Assal massacre	22 July 2013	Khan al-Asal, Aleppo	51-123+	Al-Nusra Front/Ansar al-Khilafah	Islamist rebel factions killed 51 soldiers (opposition claim) or 123 civilians (government claim).
Tell Aran and Tell Hasel massacre	27–30 July 2013	Aleppo Governorate	50–70	Islamic State and Al-Nusra Front	Massacre by the Islamic State of Iraq and the Levant (ISIS) and Al-Nusra Front fighters in the mostly Kurdish villages of Tell Aran and Tell Hasel in Aleppo Governorate.
Al-Barouda massacres	4 August 2013	Latakia Governorate	190–205+	Rebels	Rebel groups, al-Nusra Front, ISIS, Jaish al-Muhajireen wal-Ansar, Ahrar al-Sham and Suqour al-Ezz, attacked and overran army positions in the Sheikh Nabhan area. Human Rights Watch claimed some 190 noncombatants were killed, and 200 were taken captive.
Ghouta chemical attack	21 August 2013	Al-Ghouta, Damascus, Syria	281–1,729	Syrian Army	Government forces struck Jobar, Zamalka, 'Ain Tirma, and Hazzah in the Eastern Ghouta region with chemical weapons.
Sadad massacre	Late October 2013	Sadad, Homs Governorate, Syria	46+	Al-Nusra Front	After capturing the Christian town on 21 October, Islamist rebels led by the Al-Nusra Front committed a massacre of its residents, including women and children. A total of 46 victims were discovered in mass graves and a nearby well after the village was retaken by government forces. Ten remain missing. It was considered the largest massacre against Christians in the whole war.
Adra massacre	6 December 2013	Adra, Syria	32–80	Rebels	This was the alleged massacre of at least 32 civilians in the industrial town of Adra, Syria. Government claims that at least 80 were killed. It was reportedly conducted by the al-Nusra Front and Jaysh al-Islam, a subgroup of the Islamic Front.
Maan massacre	9 February 2014	Hama Governorate	21–62	Jund al-Aqsa, Ahrar ash-Sham	Targeted attack of the Alawite village of Maan by Salafi groups.
Kobanî massacre	25–26 June 2014	Kobani, Aleppo Governorate	223–233+	Islamic State	During ISIS's siege of Kobani, it committed a string of car bomb attacks against the besieged Kurdish population. ISIS fighters also reportedly disguised themselves as Kurdish fighters to infiltrate the town, and fired indiscriminately at civilians with rifles and RPGs. The attacks, occurring over the course of a few days, killed between 223 and 233 civilians, in addition to dozens of YPG fighters.
Shu'aytat massacre	Mid August 2014	Deir ez-Zor Governorate	900–1200+	Islamic State	In mid August Islamic State fighters massacred some 900 people, mostly men, of the Shu'aytat tribe in Deir ez-Zor Governorate. Later estimates put the death toll at over 1200. It was considered the largest massacre ISIS committed in Syria.
Akrama School Bombing	1 October 2014	Homs, Homs Governorate	54	Al-Nusra Front or Jund al-Sham (suspected)	On 1 October 2014, twin bombings (first IED, then a suicide bomb) targeted an elementary school in the Alawite-majority neighborhood of Akrama in Homs, killing 54 people (47 of whom were school children). The motive of the attack was sectarian. No group claimed responsibility, but it is widely suspected that either Jund al-Sham or al-Nusra Front were responsible.
Mabujah massacre	31 March 2015	Mabujah, Hama Governorate	46+	Islamic State	On 31 March 2015, ISIS attacked the Ismaili-majority Maboujah village in the mixed Sabburah subdistrict in the Eastern Hama countryside, summarily executing dozens of its inhabitants from all sects, including Ismailis, Sunnis and Alawites.
Eshtabraq massacre	25 April 2015	Eshtabraq, Idlib Governorate	200+	Al-Nusra Front and rebel allies	After Jabhat al-Nusra and Islamist allies in the "Army of Conquest" seized Jisr al-Shughour, they attacked an Alawite village named Eshtabraq and committed the massacre of its remaining inhabitants who did not flee.
Palmyra massacre	22 May 2015	Tadmur, Homs Governorate	400+	Islamic State	After capturing the city of Palmyra, Islamic State massacred over 400 civilians
Qalb Loze massacre	10 June 2015	Idlib Governorate	23+	Al-Nusra Front	On 10 June al-Nusra fighters opened fire on residents in the village from Qalb lawza in Idlib province, the victims were from the Druze sect.
Kafr Saghir massacre	20 March 2016	Kafr Saghir, Aleppo Governorate	20+	Islamic State	Islamic State massacred 20+ Arabs and Kurds while attacking the Government held town of Kafr Saghir
Al-Quds hospital strike	27 April 2016	Aleppo	55	Syrian or Russian Air Force	On 27 April 2016, four airstrikes on rebel-held East Aleppo struck the Al-Quds hospital and surrounding civilian homes, killing dozens of civilians and medical staff.
Zara'a massacre	12 May 2016	Hama Governorate	49+	Al-Nusra Front and Ahrar Al-Sham	Rebels led by the Al-Qaeda branch Jabhat al-Nusra and Ahrar ash-Sham massacred 42 civilians and seven NDF militiamen while kidnapping up to 70 people after taking control of the Alawite village of Zara'a in Southern Hama.
May 2016 Jableh and Tartus bombings	23 May 2016	Jableh and Tartus, Latakia Governorate	189	ISIS	Series of car bomb and suicide attacks in government-controlled territory that hosts Russian military bases.
Khan Shaykhun chemical attack	4 April 2017	Khan Shaykhun	89–100+	Syrian Arab Air Force	
Al-Rashideen massacre	15 April 2017	Aleppo Governorate	126+	Rebels	A suicide bombing targeted a convoy of buses in the Al-Rashideen suburb of Aleppo carrying civilian evacuees from the besieged Shiite villages of Kafriya and al-Fu'ah near Idlib, mostly women and children. The attack was widely attributed to be the work of a rebel suicide bomber, but no group claimed responsibility. The rebel group Ahrar Al-Sham denied responsibility, as some of its own fighters were also killed in the blast.
Al-Qaryatayn massacre	Mid October 2017	Al-Qaryatayn, Homs Governorate	128	Islamic State	A massacre of the town's residents after ISIS retook the town briefly from the Syrian Army a second time in early October 2017. Those massacred were accused of cooperating with the Syrian government. Of the victims, 83 were reportedly killed in the last 48 hours of ISIS rule.
Douma chemical attack	7 April 2018	Douma, Syria	48–85	Syrian Armed Forces	
2018 As-Suwayda attacks	25 July 2018	As-Suwayda	258	Islamic State	A series of bombings and mass shootings that targeted the Druze population of As-Suwayda.
The Baghuz strike	18 March 2019	Baghuz	~70	United States Air Force	American F-15E attack jet dropped a 500-pound bomb on large group of women and children huddled at river bank near a dirt field in the town of Baghuz. A jet tracking them then dropped two 2,000-pound bombs on the remaining survivors, killing them all.
Ma'arrat Nu'man market bombing	22 July 2019	Maarrat al-Numan, Idlib Governorate	43	Russian Air Force	Aerial bombardment of a marketplace and the surrounding houses in the Syrian opposition-held town of Ma'arrat al-Numan by Russian Air Force, The bombing killed 43 civilians, including three girls, and injured another 109 people.
Hass refugee camp bombing	16 August 2019	Hass, Idlib Governorate	20	Russian Air Force	Aerial bombardment of a refugee camp killed 20 civilians, including a pregnant woman, and injured 52 others.
Qah missile strike	20 November 2019	Qah	15	Syrian Arab Army (Iran) Iranian militias in Syria	Qah was struck by a ground-to-ground missile from the Syrian Arab Army with Iranian militias support. It killed at least 15 people, including six children
2020 Afrin bombing	28 April 2020	Afrin	53	Unknown	Bomb in a tank truck was detonated at an open-air market in Afrin, killing 53 civilians and wounding over 50 others.
2023 Al-Sukhnah attack	17 February 2023	Desert near Al-Sukhnah, Homs Governorate	68	Islamic State	A group of Islamic State insurgents attacked a large group of truffle farmers and their Syrian Army escort in the desert, southwest of the town of Al-Sukhnah in Homs Governorate, At least 61 civilians and seven Syrian soldiers were killed in the attack
2023 Homs drone strike	5 October 2023	Homs Military Academy, Homs	95+	Unknown	Syrian military graduation ceremony at the Homs Military Academy was targeted by a drone strike, leaving 95 people dead and over 277 injured
2024 Azaz bombing	30 March 2024	Azaz	8	Unknown	According to volunteer rescue group the White Helmets, two of those killed were children
Majdal Shams attack	27 July 2024	Majdal Shams, Israeli-occupied Golan Heights	12	Hezbollah	Twelve people, all children, are killed in rocket strikes on the Druze village of Majdal Shams in the Israeli-occupied Golan Heights
2024 Aleppo University Hospital airstrike	1 December 2024	Aleppo	12	Russian Air Force	
2024 Ayn Issa attack	8 December 2024	Raqqa Governorate	11	(Turkey) Turkish Armed Forces	A Turkish drone strike targeted a residential structure in Al-Mustariha village in Raqqa Governorate, killing eleven members of a single family, which included six children.

=== Israeli invasion of Syria ===
Name	Date	Location	Deaths	Perpetrators	Notes
Beit Jinn raid	28 November 2025	Beit Jinn, Rif Dimashq Governorate	13	Israel Defense Forces	Israeli forces launched an incursion and raid in an attempt to arrest members of militant group known as the Jamaa Islamiya. The operation ended killing 13 people, including 10 civilians and of them, two were children.

== Syrian transitional government ==
Name	Date	Location	Deaths	Perpetrators	Notes
2025 massacres of Syrian Alawites	January 2025 – present	Latakia, Tartus, Hama and Homs Governorates	1,711 – 2,246	(Syria) Syrian Armed Forces Saraya Ansar al-Sunnah (Syria) Syrian National Army Local Sunni Muslim civilians	Series of targeted killings against Syrian Alawites by pro-government forces primarily located in coastal Syria. The victims also included some Christians and Sunnis who sheltered Alawite neighbors from the mass killings.
2025 massacres of Syrian Druze	28 April-2 May 2025	Al-Suwayda	10	(Syria) Syrian Armed Forces	Sectarian conflict conducted against Druze militias by Syrian transitional government military units and affiliated militias resulted in the deaths of several Druze civilians, many of whom were extrajudicially killed.
Mar Elias Church attack	22 June 2025	Mar Elias Church, Duwayla, Damascus	25+	Islamic State (alleged) Saraya Ansar al-Sunnah (claimant)	A suicide bombing and shooting attack on worshippers in the Mar Elias Church in Duwayla, Damascus during Sunday mass.
2025 Suwayda Massacres	Mid July 2025	Al-Suwayda Governorate	167 civilians killed in the fighting (Note: 162 civilians in Suwayda, including 51 women and 21 children.; 3 civilians, including one woman, by Israeli strikes on Damascus.; 2 journalists in Suwayda.); 828 civilians killed in extrajudicial executions (Note: 823 (almost all Druze), including 79 women, 15 children, and 1 elderly man, executed by government forces according to the SOHR, one of the victims was a Syrian-American citizen, another was Syrian-French.; 5 Bedouins, including a woman and a child, executed by Druze groups according to the SOHR.)	(Syria) General Security Service Local Bedouin tribes and Druze Militias Islamic State (alleged)	Clashes between local Bedouins and Druze in and around Al-Suwayda province turns into a nationwide sectarian mobilization of Syria's armed forces who attacked the province. The subsequent clashes and killings led to more than 2,000 deaths, including Druze fighters, Syrian government forces, and local Bedouin tribal groups. According to the SOHR, 831 civilians were extrajudicially executed across the province. Victims of the executions were mostly Syrians from the Druze sect, but revenge killings against Bedouin civilians by local Druze militas were also reported following the withdrawal of the Sunni armed forces.

== See also ==
- List of massacres during the Syrian civil war
- List of massacres in Ottoman Syria
