= Combat operations in 2013 during the Battle of Aleppo =

== Battles in Aleppo and on its outskirts ==
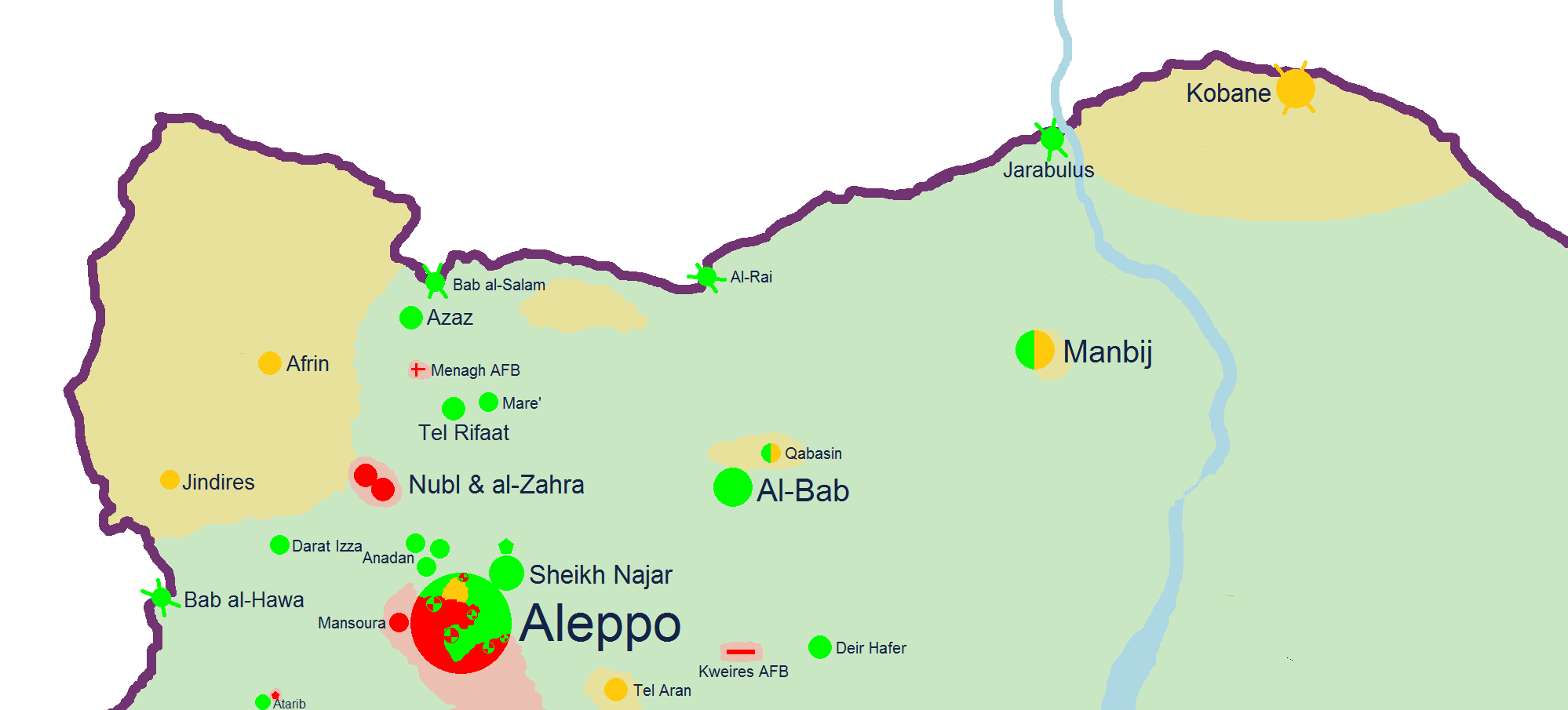
Map of the northern Aleppo Governorate at the beginning of January 2013

Beginning in late 2012, fighting intensified around the area of the airport. The al-Nusra Front unilaterally declared a no-fly zone in December and threatened to shoot down commercial aircraft, alleging that the government was using them to transport loyalist troops and military supplies. After multiple attacks on Aleppo International Airport, all flights were suspended on 1 January 2013. Rebels attacked loyalist troops at the airport perimeter, including the nearby Brigade 80. By mid-February, at least 150 people had died in this fighting.

Rebel troops attacked Menagh air base. On 30 December, government planes bombed rebel positions after the rebels entered the perimeter. On 14 January rebels had totally surrounded the base. Rebel troops stormed the base on 9 February, prompting retaliatory airstrikes. On 11 February, rebels stormed and took control of Jirah airbase, killing or capturing 40 soldiers. It was reported that rebels were in control of some operational Czech-built Aero L-39 Albatros jets.

In early 2013, the rebel offensive on the Old City persisted. By 12 January, army units had managed to gain control of the areas surrounding the historic Umayyad Mosque, the Citadel, and the Justice Palace near the Old City. However, by late February rebels had re-captured the mosque after days of heavy fighting, as government forces retreated to nearby buildings. Clashes continued afterward around the mosque.

On 15 January, twin blasts occurred at University of Aleppo during the first day of mid-terms, killing at least 87 and wounding more than 150, among them students and civilians. The university dormitories were used by refugees. Activists blamed government warplanes while the government blamed "terrorists". The Syrian government representative to the UN stated that 162 had been wounded. In the wake of the bombing, the Russian consulate in Aleppo temporary closed.

Belgian-born French journalist Yves Debay was killed during fighting on 18 January. Syrian State Media reported that rebels fired rockets at a building in the government-controlled Muhafaza Sakaniya neighbourhood, a claim that rebels denied.

On 29 January, the bodies of approximately 110 men and boys, most with bound hands and shot in the head were found on the banks of the Queiq River in the western district of Bustan al-Qasr, controlled by rebels. The victims were believed to have been detained, executed and dumped by government forces into the river over a period of several weeks. The bodies floated downstream from a government held portion of the river into a rebel area in Bustan al-Qasr. The bodies only became apparent when winter high water resided in late January. In February, a grate was placed over the river in rebel held territory to help catch other bodies floating down. Between February and mid-March, more than 80 additional bodies were dragged from the river. The continual appearance of these bodies the Queiq River to be referred to as "The River of Martyrs" by locals.

On 31 January, government warplanes bombed the Kurdish neighbourhood of Ashrafiyeh, controlled by the Popular Protection Units (YPG), killing at least twenty civilians and injuring 40. Sheikh Maqsoud was also reportedly shelled. Several days prior, on 28 January, a government tank reportedly fired a shell into the Kurdish sector of the city, killing one child and wounding two women.

In early January 2013, rebels laid siege to the strategic Police Academy in Khan al-Assal on the western outskirts, which was used by the government to shell nearby areas.

On 2 February, Sheikh Saeed district residents confirmed that rebels had taken control of the district after the Army withdrew, allowing the rebels to secure a key route to Aleppo International Airport. Sheikh Said was the last land route between Aleppo and Nayrab airport. Many of the neighbourhood's residents, who were largely loyal to the government, fled when the army retreated.

On 22 February, rebels alleged that three "Scud-type missiles" landed in the Hamra, Tariq al Bab and Hanano neighbourhoods with 29 confirmed dead and 150 wounded. SOHR later updated the toll, alleging that Scud missile strikes left 58 dead, including 35 children.

On 24 February, rebels used captured tanks to breach the walls and storm the Police Academy. Rebels took control of several buildings. Fierce clashes reportedly continued thereafter.

On 1 March, government forces retook Tel Shghaib village, located southeast of Aleppo. The following day, Army forces seized a road to the besieged airport, creating a new supply route for government forces advancing from Hama.

On 3 March, SOHR stated that 120 soldiers and 80 rebels were killed that week in the battle of the Khan al-Asal Police Academy.

On 4 March, rebels fully took over the police academy. They reported that about 45 government soldiers were killed, possibly executed, by rebels after they stormed the academy.

During March, an eight-day rebel offensive in an attempt to capture the village of Khan al-Assal on the western outskirts of the city was repelled. 200 fighters on both sides were killed in the offensive, including 120 government and 80 rebel fighters. Among government forces killed were 115 policemen, who the government alleged were executed by the opposition after capturing a police academy in Khan al-Assal.

Situation in Aleppo, mid-March 2013

On 15 March, rebels seized control of an ammunition factory complex and munitions depots in the town of Khan Tuman, southwest of Aleppo. The complex had been used to supply the Army with munitions to regularly shell rebel positions in the surrounding area.

On 19 March there was a chemical attack in Khan al-Assal, about 15 kilometers west of Aleppo, with about 26 fatalities. It was the first widely reported use of chemical weapons in the war. Both the government and rebels claim that a missile or rocket was used to deliver the agent. The Syrian Information Minister blamed the rebels for the attack, while the rebels blamed the government.

On the night of 29 March, the opposition Aleppo Media Center claimed that rebel forces had captured Sheikh Maqsoud, which was previously held by both government and Kurdish forces. However, SOHR stated that while rebel forces advanced into the district, they had captured only the eastern part. SOHR also reported that heavy fighting was still ongoing. It was also confirmed that during their advance, rebels had captured and killed the top pro-government Sunni cleric in the district, Hassan Seifeddine. Reports by pro-government Al-Ikhbariya TV and SANA stated he was beheaded and his head was placed on the minaret of the Al-Hassan Mosque. SOHR confirmed that his body had been dragged and paraded in the neighborhood.

On 31 March, government troops counterattacked. Fighting was concentrated by the Awarded bridge and in the area between eastern Sheikh Maqsoud and the Bustan al-Basha neighborhood. Since the rebel attack on the district started, 43 people had been killed, including 15 civilians, 19 government soldiers and militiamen and 9 rebels.

It was claimed by YPG fighters in Sheikh Maqsoud that following a long discussion within the group, the (mostly Kurdish) YPG decided to end their neutrality in Aleppo and switch to the rebel side, cooperating with the FSA in their advance through the district where several pro-government militias and intelligence officers were located. However, a day later, a YPG political representative denied the claim and stated that the Kurds had not aligned with the rebels, instead that Kurdish forces fought government troops after the Army attempted to reach Arab parts of the district that had been captured by opposition forces, via the Kurdish areas.

According to the YPG, as a result of these clashes, which also included artillery, 15 Syrian soldiers and one YPG fighter, YPG military council member Zekeriya Xelîl, were killed.

On 2 April, clashes erupted in the strategic village of Aziza, on the southern outskirts, from which rebels were launching attacks against Aleppo international airport and the adjacent military air base. By 6 April, the military had captured the village, pushing the rebels to the outskirts. Around 35 people were killed, including at least 18 civilians and 5 rebels. The capture of the village was seen as a strategic victory for the military because it would allow the Army to protect its supply convoys and have a strategic spot from which they could shell rebel positions.

On 13 April, nerve gas was reported in Sheikh Maqsood. An anonymous doctor reported three were dead and a dozen wounded. 1,500 doses of atropine were used with a further 2,000 sent by aid agencies. Atropine is a recognised antidote to nerve gases.

Situation in Aleppo city, mid-April 2013

By 15 April, rebels had reportedly gained full control of the northern entrance to Aleppo, as well as a factory and a weapons storage facility.

On 16 April, the first Aleppo truce was declared. The temporary truce allowed Red Crescent workers to remove 31 decomposing bodies killed in the poor al-Sakhour district located in northern Aleppo. Three of the dead were found with tied hands and four were badly burnt.

On 22 April, two Syrian Christian Orthodox Bishops were kidnapped on their return to Aleppo after completing humanitarian work. State media blamed the rebels while the rebels stated, "all probabilities are open."

On 23 April rebels took control of a key position at the strategic Mennagh Military airbase, allowing them to enter the airbase after a months-long siege.

On 24 April, the 11th-century minaret of the rebel-held Great Mosque of Aleppo was destroyed in the fight. Rebels claimed that the Army destroyed the minaret with tank fire to prevent it becoming a sniper position, while the government claimed that it was destroyed by the Nusra Front.

On 4 May, the Siege of Menagh Air Base continued amid reports that rebels had made further advances. It was claimed that rebels had killed the base commander and also seized the second military detachment of the base. Rebels claimed that a group of pilots had defected and assassinated the base's commanding officer. The defectors told rebels that around 200 soldiers remained on base, garrisoned in the headquarters building and supported by a handful of tanks. Many soldiers resorted to sleeping under tanks, fearing a rebel assault.

On 9 May, it was reported that air strikes forced rebels to retreat from the air base.

On 15 May, rebel forces assaulted the main prison in central Aleppo where some 4,000 inmates were held. These include both common and political prisoners. The attack was initiated by twin car bombs at the prison entrance. Rebels secured one compound that housed government forces. The attack bogged down due to the intervention of Syrian tanks and planes. No prisoners were freed.

On 16 May, rebels were forced to retreat when soldiers began throwing inmate's bodies out of the windows. It was reported that rebel fighters took control of a building inside the prison after blowing up the main gate. Rebel fighters continued to hit the facility with rockets late into the night.

In early May, clashes started between rebel groups Ghuraba al-Sham and groups operating under Judicial Committee alliance. The latter accused Ghuraba al-Sham, which was in alliance with Jabhat al-Nusra, of going rogue and looting factories. According to various rebel reports Jabhat al-Nusra started weakening after Nusra leader al-Jolani pledged loyalty to Al-Queda leader Ayman al-Zawahiri. Before the announcements rebel fighters of various brigades were leaving for Jabhat al-Nusra, in one day about 120 left. Several rebel officials also commented on their disappearance from much of Aleppo.

A former government scientist claimed that the Syrian government was using chemical weapons in small quantities to slow rebel advances. Amongst these areas were the Sheikh Maksoud district. The scientist, who worked for Centre for Scientific Studies and Research, claimed that the alleged gas attack on Khan al-Asal, Aleppo, on 19 March 2013, was likely tear gas and not nerve gas. A UNHRC report dated 12 February 2014 concluded that the extremely deadly nerve agent sarin was used in the 3/19 Khan al-Asal attack and that the sarin used in that attack, bore the ‘same unique hallmarks’ as the sarin used in the 8/21 al-Ghouta chemical attack.

On 26 May, 15 inmates were killed, according to SOHR, at the central prison during fighting.

On 1 June, 50 prisoners were reported to have been executed by government soldiers, while a further 31 were killed by the rebel bombardment of the central prison. 40 government soldiers were killed by rebels.

On 2 June, a senior commander in the Lebanese movement Hezbollah, said that Assad's forces had called thousands of Hezbollah fighters deeper into Northern Syria, in and around Aleppo, to shore up Assad's overstretched forces and potentially break the stalemate there. It was estimated that around 4,000 Hezbollah fighters responded. Rebels said Hezbollah forces had entered the city on Sunday and were preparing an attack. An unnamed Hezbollah commander stated: “We are going to go after strongholds where they (the FSA) think they are safe. They are going to fall like dominos.”

The diversion of rebel forces to the Battle of al-Qusayr potentially weakened the rebel grip on Aleppo.

On 13 June, in a statement on recent clashes in the province of Afrin, in western Kurdistan, People's Defense Units (YPG) Command said that Turkish soldiers attacked the village of Mele Xelîl in Afrin late Wednesday. YPG said, "The armed groups which first attacked our forces in the villages of Aqîn, Basil and Zarat increased in number as of June 10 when they attacked Meresk and Kefer Mezê villages. The armed groups were strongly responded and defeated by our forces". The Command remarked that YPG had strengthened its control as armed groups had to withdraw from the region after the clashes one day later. Referring to the Turkish attacks, YPG said "Troops of the Turkish military launched an attack against the village of Mele Xelîl in Afrin's Cindêris district late Wednesday in support of the armed groups targeting the region of Afrin." YPG said Turkish soldiers were repulsed from the region as a result of the response by YPG units.

== Operation Northern Storm ==
On 9 June 2013, the Army announced the start of operation "Northern Storm", in an attempt to recapture territory in and around Aleppo. In preparation for the assault the Army reinforced the Shiite villages of Al-Nubbul and Zahra which the government intended to use to advance into Aleppo. Rebel defenses in Salamiyeh, south of Aleppo, were strengthened to prevent tanks from moving from that direction.

Between 7 and 14 June, Army troops, government militiamen, and reportedly Hezbollah fighters, launched the operation. Over a one-week period, government forces advanced both in Aleppo city and the countryside, pushing back the rebels. However, on 14 June, according to an opposition activist, the tide started reversing, after rebels halted an armoured reinforcement column from Aleppo headed for the two Shiite villages northwest of the city. As of 16 June, the rebels had held back the column for two days. Rebels claimed to have destroyed one tank and killed 20 government soldiers northwest of Maaret al-Arteek. Before the column was stopped, government forces had captured the high ground at Maaret al-Arteek, threatening rebel positions. Rebels were boosted after receiving at least 50 Russian-made Konkurs anti-tank missiles in the previous few days from Saudi Arabia. During 13 June fighting in Aleppo city, government forces temporarily advanced into rebel-held Sakhour district from two directions, but were soon repelled.

Situation in Aleppo city, mid-June 2013

On 12 June, FSA fighters claimed to have killed 40 Hezbollah and Syrian army soldiers, who were traveling in buses, in an ambush between the villages of al-Bouz and al-Khanasir.

On 17 June, a car-bomb hit an Army facility in al-Douwairinah district, east of the international airport. Jabhat al-Nusra claimed responsibility for the attack. Some opposition activists claimed the attack killed at least 60 troops. However, according to SOHR, only six soldiers were killed and 15 wounded.

== Rebel offensive in the West ==
Approximate situation in Aleppo governorate, June 2013

On 21 June 2013, the FSA said that 13 rebel brigades, amongst them the large Liwa al-Tawhid and the Farouq units, had launched a new offensive. One of the targets was the military research facility in the Rashidin area of New Aleppo. Rebel mortars set it ablaze. The rebels claimed that they were moving forward in Rashidin with the aim of removing military targets including areas used by the army to shell rebel areas.

On 23 June, 12 government soldiers were killed by a car bomb while 6 rebels from the Islamist Al-Farouq Brigade were killed.

On 24 June, rebels claimed to have repulsed a loyalist attack crediting their victory to newly arrived anti-tank weapons. Aleppo military council leader Colonel Abdul Jabbar al-Oqaidi claimed, "The regime pushed forward in the north of the city, but the Free Syrian Army caused a lot of casualties and they went back to their bases." The renewed offensive was called "The Battle of Qadisiyah", a reference to a battle, from 636 CE, in which an Arab army defeated a Persian army. According to one rebel fighter, the rebels were launching counterattacks in the north east and west of the city, advancing into the agricultural research center.

On 25 June, rebels advancing in western Aleppo were reportedly engaging in "tit for tat" operations against the Army in Rashidin and Ashrafiyeh, according to SOHR.

A numbering of people were killed in the shelling of Aleppo Central Prison on 7 July, though who fired the shells was not immediately known. Syrian government forces retained control over New Aleppo despite initial rebel advances in the area, with the opposing sides entrenched sometimes as close as 200 meters to one another.

An activist said that an apparent rebel blockade of the southwestern highway was causing fast-emerging food shortages in government-held areas. A rebel source denied that it was intentional, saying that intensified fighting on the highway was to blame, with no vehicle on the highway safe from the fighting. The Southwestern highway is the source of food supplies to western Aleppo, and among the most strategic roads leading into the city.

On 17 July, rebel fighters were reportedly making small advances in Salaheddine.

On 21 July, reports emerged that rebel fighters had taken full control of the Aleppo suburb of Khan al-Asal, along with the towns of Mataa and Summakiyah, east of the city. Khan Al-Assal was the last government stronghold west of Aleppo, and rebels claimed that seizing it had given them control of the entire Western Aleppo countryside. Unverified video footage showed the body of the Syrian Army's operations commander in Khan Al-Assal, General Hassan Youssef Hassan who rebels of the Al Ansar brigade claimed they killed in clashes. In the video they also displayed his ID card. Both opposition and government sources reported that about 150 government soldiers were killed during the battle, including 51 who were executed after they had surrendered. The executions were reportedly carried out by members of the Al-Nusra Front and the Ansar al-Khalafa al-Islamiya Brigade.

By 23 July, some analysts regarded operation "Northern Storm" to be a feint, since no large-scale offensive was launched by the Army, with the aim of diverting rebel resources to the Aleppo region while government forces escalated their Siege of Homs in an attempt to clear out the remaining rebel hold-outs in the city center.

On 31 July, government soldiers attacked rebel positions outside Khan al-Asal after gathering reinforcements for a new assault.

On 6 August, rebel fighters took full control of the Menagh airbase after an almost 10 months long siege.

On 16 August, government warplanes bombed the rebel-held Kalassa district, destroying three buildings and killing 15.

On 23 August, rebels took control of 13 villages in southern and eastern Aleppo.

On 26 August, rebels took control of the strategic town of Khanasir located between Aleppo and Hama province reportedly killing more than 50 pro government fighters. The town was the Syrian Army's only supply route out of Aleppo, and SOHR claimed that its capture had effectively left pro government forces in Aleppo besieged by rebel forces.

On 21 September, rebels seized control of several villages south of Aleppo in an offensive aimed at cutting the supply lines of Pro Assad forces from Damascus.

On 1 October, 16 militants were killed in an ambush while trying to slip into the Salah al-Din district. A number of other militants were also killed in a separate incident during clashes with the Syrian army in the Ansari district, adjacent to Salah al-Din.

On 3 October, the Syrian Army recaptured the strategic town of Khanasir, after a weeks-long battle pitting Syrian troops against rebels, a monitoring group said. Several days later, the supply line to Aleppo was reopened as army troops advanced in the villages around Khanaser. State agency SANA claimed the Army had restored control over 40 villages in the area and engineering units had dismantled insurgent fortifications, about 600 anti-tank mines and 1,500 explosive devices.

On 10 October, a rebel advance in Salaheddine led to a large gun battle, which left 10 Syrian government troops dead, along with 6 rebels.

On 18 October, 20 soldiers and 7 rebels were killed after rebel groups stormed an air defense facility near the towns of Hujaira and Obaida, southwest of Aleppo.

== Battle of Base 80 and Syrian Army advances ==
Situation around Aleppo from October–November 2013

On 8 November 2013, before sunrise, the Syrian Army launched an attack against "Base 80", controlled by the rebels since February 2013, near the Aleppo airport. The Army, backed up by tanks and heavy artillery, unleashed "the heaviest barrage in more than a year" according to residents in Aleppo. A rebel fighter said, "We did not see it coming. The attack came as a real shock to us." According to Al-Jazeera, if the Army captured the base, it would cut the rebel supply routes between Aleppo city and the opposition-controlled town of al-Bab, about 30 kilometers from the Turkish border. By morning, the Army took over several areas of "Base 80", leaving them in control of large parts of it. Later in the afternoon, rebel forces, including ISIS, received reinforcements and regrouped, after which they attacked the base. During the fighting, two dozen air and artillery strikes struck rebel positions. After dark, rebels counter-attacked and by dawn the next day managed to recapture most of the base, with fighting still occurring around it. During the attack, rebels used GRAD rockets to strike the base.

On 10 November, fighting still continued around "Base 80", with reports of more fighting inside the base itself. During the clashes, rebels targeted two Army armored vehicles, while one rebel tank was destroyed, killing five rebel fighters. By the afternoon, the Army was once again in full control of the base. According to the SOHR, 63 rebels, including at least 11 foreign fighters, and 32 soldiers were killed during the battle. One other report put the number of rebels killed between 60 and 80. Army units were backed-up by Hezbollah fighters and pro-government militias during the assault.

Situation in Aleppo city, mid-November 2013

By 11 November, the Army had captured a series of nearby positions, securing most of the area around Aleppo International Airport.

On 12 November, government forces, backed by tanks, captured two highrise buildings in the northern Ashrafieh and Bani Zeid districts, and advanced into the two neighborhoods after close-quarter street fighting. On 17 November, Syrian Army troops advanced in the Saif al-Dawlah neighborhood and seized control over a number of sites, with fighting still ongoing in the neighborhood.

By mid-December, government forces were reportedly in control of 60 percent of the city, according to the Kurdish news agency Rudaw.

== Operation Canopus Star ==
In early December 2013, the Syrian Army launched operation Canopus Star with the aim to encircle Aleppo and cut rebel supply lines into the city, thus besieging rebel-held areas.

Between 15 and 28 December 2013, a series of Army helicopter attacks with barrel bombs against rebel-held areas of Aleppo left 517 people dead, including 151 children, 46 women and 46 rebels, according to the SOHR. A rebel commander claimed that by 26 December, more than 1,000 people had been killed in the bombing campaign. On 9 January, aid groups stated more than 700 people had been killed since the start of the bombing campaign.

On 20 December, Islamist rebels, including members of the Al-Nusra Front, took control over the Kindi hospital, which had been used by government soldiers as a base for several months. Reuters photojournalist Molhem Barakat was killed during the action. At least 20 regular soldiers were killed and dozens were taken prisoner in the fighting which began after two Al-Nusra fighters detonated themselves at checkpoints guarding the hospital. A few days later, government forces stormed and recaptured much of the Bani Zeid neighborhood on the northeastern outskirts of the city.

On 25 December, pro-government sources claimed that the Syrian Army captured the al-Sheikh Maqsoud and al-Jbanat areas of Aleppo city.
