= Liwa Jund al-Haramain =

Syrian rebel group

Liwa Jund al-Haramain لواء جند الحرمين
- Leaders: Othman Othman †; Salah Nabhan †; Ibrahim al-Bannawi
- Dates active: 2012-Unknown
- Groups: 17th Battalion; 19th Brigade
- Part of: Army of Mujahideen; 19th Division; Ahrar al-Sham; Syrian Democratic Forces
- Wars: Syrian Civil War

Liwa Jund al-Haramain (the Brigade of Soldiers of the Two Holy Mosques) is a Syrian rebel group aligned with the Syrian Democratic Forces, and part of the Manbij Military Council and SDF-member group Northern Sun Battalion.

== Background ==
The group was formed in 2012 in Manbij and operated in Aleppo's countryside between Manbij and Jarabulus. The group fought against the Syrian government and later came into conflict with the Islamic State of Iraq and the Levant. The group also took part in the Battle of Aleppo, and was allied with the rebel Army of Mujahideen.

According to one pro-rebel media outlet, the founding leader was Othman Othman, who had been active in demonstrations at the Palace of Justice in Aleppo in the civil uprising phase of the Syrian civil war but later died in fighting at the Kuweires Military Aviation Institute in 2013. The brigade worked in the city of Aleppo and participated in the Battle of Aleppo.

Ankara University's Abdul Rahman al-Hajj describes the brigade as having been somewhat influenced by Salafism but taking a more moderate "post-jihadi" path after the rise of the Islamic State.

== History ==
The Arab-American website almjhar News reported on 22 July 2013 that Salah Nabhan, who they described as the commander of the 19th Division’s Jund al-Haramain Brigade, was killed in fighting in Khan al-Assal.

On 17 November 2013, Liwa Jund al-Haramain clashed with ISIL, Liwa Ahrar Souriya and Daraa al-Jazeera, as well as another faction believed to be associated with ISIL after days of tensions in Manbij, between Liwa Jund al-Haramain and other factions in the city. The group's headquarters were stormed by ISIL and allied opposition groups, and a drive-by type shooting also occurred at their headquarters. The clashes came after Jund al-Haramain reportedly overran the headquarters of other factions in the city, and killed the mother and son of an ISIL fighter by shooting at the car they were in.

On 3 January 2014, after the formation of the Army of Mujahideen rebel alliance, Liwa Jund al-Haramain joined the alliance, alongside the Nour al-Din al-Zenki Movement and Ansar al-Khilafah, a Hizb ut-Tahrir aligned group. On the same day the Army of Mujahideen declared war on ISIL with the Syrian Revolutionaries Front. In 2014, it retreated from areas around Manbij taken by ISIL to Kobane and Turkey.

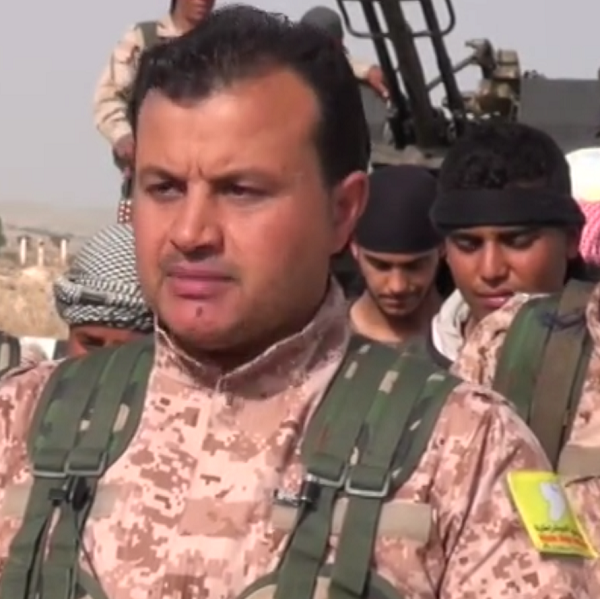
Ibrahim al-Banawi, leader of the Soldiers of the Two Holy Mosques Brigade

According to one pro-rebel news outlet, its second commander, Ibrahim al-Banawi, had a "bad reputation since he took command of the brigade, which affected the reputation of the brigade, whose actions turned from fighting against the regime... to acts of robbery and looting in the city of Manbij and outside it until the organization entered the city."

The Syrian Observatory on Human Rights (SOHR) reported that in late July 2014 Jabhat al-Nusra raided the headquarters of a brigade with the same name, which operated on the Syrian border with the Israeli occupied Golan Heights, killing several members of the brigade and arresting its commander Sharif al-Saffouri.

In March 2016, Liwa Jund al-Haramain joined the Syrian Democratic Forces. It was part of the Jaysh al-Salam operations room fighting ISIL in Raqqa. In mid-2018, during Turkey's Operation Olive Branch, pro-Turkish TRT World described it as the main Arab component of the SDF in the Manbij area, fighting alongside Kurdish forces against Turkish incursions.

According to the pro-government Al-Masdar News, al-Banawi defected to the Syrian Army in August 2017, after meeting with Suheil al-Hassan of the Syrian Army's Tiger Forces. However, al-Banawi was reportedly still with the Northern Sun Battalion in January 2018. Another former member, Abu Ali Raslan from Manbij, was reported to have defected in 2018.
