= Timeline of the Syrian civil war (January–April 2013) =

The following is a timeline of the Syrian Civil War from January to April 2013. Information about aggregated casualty counts is found at Casualties of the Syrian Civil War.

== January 2013 ==
=== 1 January ===
According to Lakhdar Brahimi, a United Nations-Arab League envoy, he told news reporters in Cairo, Egypt that the number of people killed could reach to 100,000, which would mean that 2013 would be the deadliest year of the war thus far.

On New Year's Day, Aleppo International Airport shut down due to rebel attacks.

An anonymous Syrian student at the West Virginia University College of Law in Morgantown, West Virginia and his mother gained asylum in the United States, with assistance from the university. They had both originally hoped to return to Syria.

The LCC reported 136 people killed, including 44 in Hama and 42 in the Damascus suburbs.

Approximately forty individuals, including a Syrian Army General, three colonels, several officers and their families defected to Turkey via Reyhanlı, Hatay province, where they were taken to the Apaydin refugee camp.

It had been reported by the United Nations that the death toll was 60,000 instead of 45,000, though it is unclear how many people have been killed in the war.

The LCC reported 207 people killed, including 141 in the Damascus suburbs, among which 47 were killed when a warplane struck a petrol station in Mleiha. Activist Abu Fouad described at least 30 "burnt or dismembered" bodies. The explosion was triggered by a missile from a MiG fighter.

=== 2 January ===
The United Nations says the estimated death toll from the conflict has surpassed 60,000 people.

=== 3 January ===
According to an activist group in Syria, a car bomb exploded late Thursday in a Damascus gas station in the middle-class Masakin Barzeh neighborhood, killing at least nine people. The pro-government Ikhbariyeh TV claimed "terrorists" had killed at least 30 civilians, though there was no immediate claim of responsibility.

The LCC reported 170 people killed, including 74 in the Damascus suburbs.

The SOHR reported the deaths of over 210 people, including 101 civilians. 52 rebels were killed, including a defected officer. SOHR also reported that 5 "foreign jihadists" were killed in fighting; 2 Libyans, a Palestinian, a Turk and a Saudi.

The Damascus Suburbs witnessed continued clashes, with 45 civilians and 15 rebels killed.

=== 4 January - Friday of "Homs calls upon the Revolutionaries" ===
NATO began deployment of Patriot missiles as air defence in Turkey. The US European Command batteries were the first to be shipped to Southern Turkey.

The LCC reported 129 people killed, including 70 in the Damascus suburbs.

=== 5 January ===
Clashes were reported in the eastern Deir Ezzor city around the technical services building that was recently seized by rebels after they killed and injured government soldiers and took several others hostage. More fighting was reported near the Air Force intelligence building in Aleppo, while shelling was reported in the town of Hritan in the city's suburbs. Meanwhile, in the central province of Homs, activists said government forces shelled the rebel-held town of Rastan and the farms surrounding the neighbourhood of Bab Amr in Homs city. − − The LCC reported 79 people killed, including 35 in the Damascus suburbs. CNN has reported that the Free Syrian Army have taken control of 70% of the Taftanaz heliport

=== 6 January ===
Israel announced it would be building a five-meter-high fence on the Israel-Syria border.

The LCC reported 101 people killed, including 28 in the Damascus suburbs.

=== 7 January ===
The LCC reported 72 people killed, including 29 in Aleppo and 26 in the Damascus suburbs.

=== 8 January ===
A riot broke out at a Syrian refugee camp in Zaatari, Jordan.

The LCC reported that 118 civilians were killed by the end of the day, including 35 in the Damascus suburbs. The LCC reported that over 70 civilians were executed by the Syrian army in the town of al-Mastumah, south of Idlib city.

=== 9 January ===
Forty-eight Iranians who were kidnapped by Free Syrian Army rebels in the capital Damascus in August 2012 are released in exchange for 2,130 prisoners held by the Syrian government.

Rebels, led by the Al-Nusra Front and Ahrar al-Sham, claimed to capture the Taftanaz airbase and has penetrated the facility, destroying or damaging at least nine helicopters

The LCC reported 92 people killed, including 29 in the Damascus suburbs.

=== 10 January ===
The LCC reported 46 people killed, including 22 in the Damascus suburbs.

=== 11 January – "Friday of the Death Camps" ===
Amid reports that his country was turning away Palestinian refugees, Jordanian prime minister Abdullah Ensour stated that accepting refugees would only encourage Israel to deport more people.

The LCC reported 101 people killed, including 40 in the town of al-houl, Hasakah, and 17 in Aleppo.

=== 13 January ===
Syrian fighter jets bombed areas held by rebels in the suburbs of Damascus. At least 36 people were killed, including 14 children.

The LCC reported 141 people killed, including 51 in the Damascus suburbs.

=== 14 January ===
At least 57 countries submit a petition to the UN Security Council, calling on it to refer the conflict to the International Criminal Court for a pending war crimes investigation.

The LCC reported 151 people killed, including 74 in the Damascus suburbs.

=== 15 January ===
Two explosions ripped in front of the campus of Aleppo University killing 52 and injuring 150. The dead included university students and civilians staying in the university dormitories after being displaced by fighting. Opposition fighters and the Syrian Government are blaming each other for the incident. The death toll later rose to 87.

The LCC reported 237 people killed, including about 100 in Aleppo and 65 in Homs and Houla.

=== 16 January ===
Massacre in the village of Haswiya in central Syria. SOHR held pro-Assad forces responsible, while an ITV News reporter said that some locals had blamed jihadist, particularly Jabhat al-Nusra fighters, but that it was impossible for him to attribute any definite responsibility from what he had seen and heard. Bill Neely: "I didn't see any rebel gunmen. I saw dozens of Syrian troops. They were reluctant to let us go very far into the village because they said there were snipers. Exactly what happened I can't prove."

Three simultaneous car bombs have killed at least 24 people from Idlib province. A leaked US State Department cable indicates that on 23 December 2012 the Syrian government used a form of nerve gas in an attack on Homs city, which lead to 5 deaths. Tear Gas has been ruled out as the cause. Agent 15 is believed to have been used.

The LCC reported 183 people killed, including 50 in the Damascus suburbs.

=== 17 January ===
Basatin al-Hasawiya massacre: According to the Syrian Observatory for Human Rights, 106 people were massacred by pro-government forces in the Basatin al-Hasawiya district of Homs, including children.

Head of the Federation of Syrian Chambers of Industry, Fares Shihabi, accused Turkish government of involvement in stealing of equipment from numerous factories in the area of Aleppo. The allegations were reported in letters to the Chairman of the UN Security Council and the UN Secretary General, stating that the robberies had been done with full knowledge of Turkish government. The LCC reported 159 people killed, including 96 in the Damascus suburbs.

=== 18 January - Friday of "Aleppo University; Martyrdom Engineering" ===
Fierce clashes raged between Kurds and Islamists in the city of Ras al-Ain and SOHR confirmed the killing of Yves Debay, a Belgian-French journalist in Aleppo, allegedly by a government sniper. A second journalist, Mohammed Hourani, has been killed by a government sniper in Daraa province while working for Al Jazeera, he was shot three times.

The LCC reported people killed, including 75 in the Damascus suburbs.

=== 19 January ===
A defected Syrian pilot carried out airstrikes on positions of the Syrian government forces in an area outside Damascus, the opposition military command in the Damascus claimed. The LCC reported 136 people killed, including 47 in the Damascus suburbs.

=== 20 January ===
The LCC reported 132 people killed, including 50 in the Damascus suburbs.

=== 21 January ===
The LCC reported 110 people killed, including 31 in Aleppo and 26 in the Damascus suburbs.

=== 22 January ===
The Russian government has announced that it is sending two planes to evacuate approximately 100 Russian citizens from Syria. Russia is also carrying out its largest naval exercises since the fall of the Soviet Union in 1991 off the Syrian coast and in the surrounding Mediterranean and Black Seas.

The LCC reported 164 people killed, including 71 in the Damascus suburbs.

=== 23 January ===
77 Russian citizens have left Syria, however Russian foreign minister Sergey Lavrov denied that Russia has any plans for a mass evacuation of its citizens from Syria. Only approximately 1000 Russians in Syria have contacted the embassy to ask about leaving Syria.

The LCC reported 146 people killed, including 74 in Aleppo and 23 in the Damascus suburbs.

=== 24 January ===
Jordan says 20,000 refugees have fled from Syria to Jordan in the past 7 days.

The LCC reported 116 people killed, including 42 in the Damascus suburbs.

=== 25 January ===
The LCC reported 117 people killed, including 31 in the Damascus suburbs.

=== 26 January ===
The LCC reported 129 people killed, including 44 in Aleppo and 40 in the Damascus suburbs.

=== 27 January ===
Israeli Defense Force has deployed its Iron Dome system to its northern border with Syria. This follows an announcement in early January that the IDF would build a security fence along its border with Syria. Israel is also considering the possibility of pre-emptive strike to prevent Syrian chemical weapon stockpiles falling into the hands of Hezbollah. Russian Prime Minister Dmitry Medvedev is quoted as saying "I think that with every day, every week and every month the chances of his (Assad's) preservation are getting smaller and smaller,". The LCC reported 106 people killed, including 41 in the Damascus suburbs.

=== 28 January ===
The LCC reported 129 people killed, including 33 in the Damascus suburbs.

=== 29 January ===
At least 80 bodies of young men and boys were found in Quweiq River in Aleppo area. The victims had been executed by a single shot to the head or neck. Their identity remains unknown, and both sides of the conflict accuse each other of the massacre, as the river flows through areas controlled by different opposing groups.

The LCC reported 229 people killed by the Syrian army including 118 in Aleppo among which 80 of them from Bustan al Qusr.

The SOHR reported the deaths of around 230 people; 72 civilians, 73 summarily executed men, 39 rebels and 41 soldiers.

=== 30 January ===
US government sources have told Associated Press that they believe a battery of SA-17 were being sent to Hezbollah in the convoy.

The LCC reported 144 people killed, including 42 in the Damascus suburbs.

=== 31 January ===
The LCC reported 105 people killed, including 58 in the Damascus suburbs.

== February 2013 ==
Acting on intelligence Syrian army units launched heavy assaults on the outskirts of Damascus. The government claims that it had intelligence that the rebels were about to launch a large scale attack on government institutions in the capital.

The LCC reported 94 people killed, including 34 in the Damascus suburbs.

=== 2 February ===
Rebels captured the area of Sheik Said, near Aleppo city, after several days of fighting. The area captured contains a major road between Aleppo city and the Aleppo Airport. The road is used by government forces to transit supplies from the Airport to its soldiers in Aleppo City.

The LCC reported 120 people killed, including 58 in the Damascus suburbs.

=== 3 February ===
The LCC reported 140 people killed, including 41 in Aleppo and 36 in the Damascus suburbs.

=== 4 February ===
Syrian bombing has killed 16 citizens in a residential apartment block in Aleppo. Among the dead are 10 people under the age of 18.

The LCC reported 111 people killed, including 41 in the Damascus suburbs.

=== 5 February ===
The LCC reported 113 people killed, including 41 in Aleppo, and 41 in the Damascus suburbs.

=== 6 February ===
Two car bombs struck government buildings in Palmyra, in Homs governorate, killing 12 security personnel and injuring 20, according to SOHR. The bombings were followed by gun battles in the city, between rebels and government forces, that left at least 8 more dead.

The LCC reported 162 people killed, including 77 in the Damascus suburbs.

=== 7 February ===
Israeli Television showed photos of the Jamraya military research complex, which the Syrian government claims was destroyed in an air raid by the Israeli Air Force on 30 January. The TV station showed a satellite picture of the site from 8 months before the air raid and another taken after the air raid which appears to show the complex unharmed. This appears to support the view that the air raid struck a convoy of arms to Hezbollah however Israel has refused to officially confirm or deny the raid, despite a broad reference to it from the Israeli Defence Minister Ehud Barak. The LCC reported 161 people killed, including 68 from the Hama province, and 33 in the Damascus suburbs.

=== 8 February ===
Rebels expanded their control in Damascus by overrunning major Syrian army checkpoints on the primary highway in Damascus.

The LCC reported 121 people killed, including 42 in the Damascus suburbs.

=== 9 February ===
Information Minister Omran al-Zoubi makes an official statement, extending an invitation to the opposition for dialogue aimed at achieving a political solution to the conflict.

The LCC reported 169 people killed, including 60 in Aleppo and 57 in the Damascus suburbs.

=== 10 February ===
The LCC reported 124 people killed, including 38 in the Damascus suburbs.

=== 11 February ===
Rebels captured the city of Al-Thawrah, Raqqa, and captured the Euphrates dam nearby.

The LCC reported 109 people killed, including 41 in Aleppo and 33 in the Damascus suburbs.

=== 12 February ===
Syrian rebels captured the Al-Jarrah airbase in the Aleppo province.

The LCC reported 136 people killed, including 47 in the Damascus suburbs.

=== 13 February ===
The LCC reported 190 people killed, including 55 in Aleppo and 37 in the Damascus suburbs.

=== 14 February ===
Rebels captured the town of al Shadidi in the Hasakah province.

The LCC reported 154 people killed, including 46 in Aleppo and 33 in the Damascus suburbs.

=== 15 February - Friday of "God is Sufficient Help" ===
After intense fighting an estimated 40,000 people become displaced in the city of Shadadah, Hasakah, adding to the estimated 2.5 million people already internally displaced in Syria.

The LCC reported 89 people killed, including 29 in the Damascus suburbs.

=== 16 February ===
The LCC reported 100 people killed, including 27 in Aleppo and 23 in the Damascus suburbs.

On 16 February a number of wounded Syrians reached the Israeli-held Golan Heights where they received medical treatment for their wounds with a number being transported to Israeli hospitals. It is the first time that Syrian citizens have tried to seek refuge in Israel.

=== 18 February ===
The LCC reported 99 people killed, including 30 in the Damascus suburbs, and 23 in Aleppo from a scud missile fired onto the Jabal Badro neighborhood.

=== 19 February ===
The LCC reported 159 people killed, including 60 in the Damascus suburbs, and 55 in Aleppo, most of whom were removed from the debris after a scud missile hit the Jabal Badro neighborhood the previous day.

=== 20 February ===
The LCC reported 162 people killed, including 96 in the Damascus suburbs, of which 48 were from a massacre in the Hamouryieh neighborhood.

=== 21 February ===
The LCC reported 210 people killed, including 103 from Damascus and its suburbs.

=== 22 February - Friday of "Raqqa on the Road to Freedom" ===
The LCC reported 213 people killed, including 90 from Aleppo and 53 in the Damascus suburbs.

On 22 February rebels again claim that they were the target of another rocket attack. Rebels say that three Scud type missiles landed in the Hamra, Tariq al Bab and Hanano neighbourhoods of Aleppo with 29 confirmed dead and 150 wounded.

=== 23 February ===
The LCC reported 148 people killed, including 74 in Aleppo and 40 in the Damascus suburbs.

=== 24 February ===
French freelance photographer Olivier Voisin, who was wounded near Idlib in January 2013, dies in Antakya, Turkey, after surgery, becoming the 23rd journalist to be killed in the conflict.

The LCC reported 140 people killed, including 40 in the Damascus suburbs.

=== 25 February ===
Syria's foreign minister said the Assad government was willing to meet with rebels, the first time that a high-ranking official has indicated a desire for such talks. The opposition calls the offer disingenuous.

The Syrian opposition agrees to attend an international summit in Rome, Italy, after foreign aid pledge.

The LCC reported 135 people killed, including 40 in the Damascus suburbs. 10303

=== 26 February ===
The LCC reported 111 people killed, including 51 in the Damascus suburbs and 50 in Aleppo.

=== 27 February ===
The LCC reported 210 people killed, including 106 in Aleppo, among 72 of them field executed in a town near Safira. 61 were killed in the Damascus suburbs.

=== 28 February ===
The United States announces that it will provide $60 million of food and medical aid, but not weapons, to rebel fighters.

The LCC reported 98 people killed, including 35 in the Damascus suburbs, and 33 in Aleppo.

== March 2013 ==
=== 1 March ===
The LCC reported 125 people killed, including 55 in Aleppo, and 45 in the Damascus suburbs.

=== 2 March ===
The LCC reported 133 people killed, including 36 in the Damascus suburbs. According to the rebels, one of the most ancient synagogues in the world, and the oldest one in Syria, was damaged by the Syrian Army. The synagogue which is named "Synagogue of Eliahu the Prophet" is located at Jubr neighbourhood in north-east Damascus.

=== 3 March ===
The LCC reported 154 people killed, including 44 in the Damascus suburbs. Anti-Assad fighters stormed Raqqa city's central prison, and after rebels swept government forces from much of the provincial capital on Monday, euphoric residents poured into the main square and tore down a bronze statue of Assad's late father, Hafez.

=== 4 March ===
The rebels captured the city of Raqqa, the capital of the Raqqa province with a population of over 200,000.

The LCC reported 149 people killed, including 40 in the Damascus suburbs.

=== 5 March ===
The LCC reported 134 people killed, including 34 in the Damascus suburbs.

=== 6 March ===
Syrian rebels capture Ar-Raqqah, the first major city to be under rebel control in the Syrian civil war.

British Foreign Secretary William Hague announces the UK will send armoured vehicles and body armour to opposition forces in Syria to help save lives.

The Syrian Opposition claims that the government of President Bashar al-Assad used chemical weapons in an attack on their forces in Aleppo (See Khan al-Assal chemical attack).

Rebels kidnapped 21 Filipino UNDOF peacekeepers on the disputed Golan Heights between Syria and Israel. On a video uploaded to YouTube, a group that identified itself as "The Martyrs of Yarmouk" claimed responsibility and said the peacekeepers would be held until Syrian government forces withdrew from the area around Al Jamlah. However, the leader of the political opposition later said that the peacekeepers of their own safety. He said the UN convoy was at risk in the area, which is under Syrian government bombardment, and that the peacekeepers would be released to the Red Cross. Video footage showed the peacekeepers, one of whom said, "We are here safe in this place. We are here because while we are passing through position (unintelligible) to Jamlah, there were bombing and artillery fires. This is why we stopped and, civilian people tell us, for our safety, and distributed us in different places to keep us safe. And they give us good accommodation and give us food to eat and water to drink."

The LCC reported 141 people killed, including 34 in the Damascus suburbs.

=== 7 March ===
The LCC reported 111 people killed, including 23 in the Damascus suburbs and 23 in Aleppo.

=== 8 March - Friday of "Revolutionary Women" ===
The UN has organized the release of its 21 kidnapped peacekeepers however the operation was abandoned due to safety concerns by the UN.

The LCC reported 81 people killed, including 29 in the Damascus suburbs.

=== 9 March ===
The LCC reported 111 people killed, including 44 in the Damascus suburbs.

The UN Peacekeepers were released by Syrian rebels to Jordanian authorities, all peacekeepers were unharmed.

=== 10 March ===
The LCC reported 125 people killed, including 46 in the Damascus suburbs.

=== 11 March ===
The LCC reported 121 people killed, including 36 in the Damascus suburbs.

Ukrainian journalist Anhar Kochneva escaped rebel custody after five months of imprisonment.

=== 12 March ===
The LCC reported 103 people killed, including 50 in the Damascus suburbs.

=== 13 March ===
The LCC reported 103 people killed, including 38 in the Damascus suburbs.

=== 14 March ===
The LCC reported 137 people killed, including 37 in the Damascus suburbs.

=== 15 March - Two year mark ===
The LCC reported 144 people killed, including 59 in the Damascus suburbs. News Line Institute later reported that largely Christian pro-government militias carried out a massacre of pro-opposition civilians in the township of Kfar Hod.

=== 16 March ===
The LCC reported 144 people killed, including 41 in the Damascus suburbs.

=== 17 March ===
Rebels claimed that General Mohammed Khalluf, the chief of the Syrian army's logistics, and his son, a captain of a reconnaissance unit, had both defected.

The LCC reported 119 people killed, including 52 in the Damascus suburbs.

=== 18 March ===
Syrian Air Force planes bombed suspected rebel stronghold in Lebanon for the first time. It was the first time that the Syrian Air Force had bombed Lebanon.

The LCC reported 128 people killed, including 46 in the Damascus suburbs.

=== 19 March ===
On 19 March chemical weapons, specifically Sarin, was used for the first time in the Syrian Civil War (previous incidents have been alleged), in the Khan al-Assal chemical attack. SANA reported 25 dead in an attack in Khan al-Assal, Aleppo province, while some reports placed the number of deaths at 40. The gas used was described as having a "chlorine-like smell". Rebels alleged that a SCUD missile was used to deliver the agent. The Syrian Information Minister blamed the rebels for the attack. The attacks occurred in a village held at the time by the Syrian Army. It was, however, noted by an Obama administration official at the White House that they had "no information suggesting opposition groups have chemical weapons capability". Senior US intelligence officials said there is a "high probability" that Syria deployed chemical weapons in the ongoing civil war, but final verification is needed. On a video distributed on YouTube it was alleged that chemical weapons had also been deployed in an attack in Ateibeh, near Damascus.

The LCC reported 131 people killed, including 46 in the Damascus suburbs.

=== 20 March ===
The LCC reported 140 people killed, including 57 in the Damascus suburbs.

=== 21 March ===
The Syrian government says a bomb attack in Damascus killed 42, including a senior Sunni cleric Sheikh Mohamed Said Ramadan Al-Bouti, and wounded 84. According to the BBC's Jim Muir a video circulating on the internet purporting to show the explosion of 21 March in the mosque "raises many questions about the death of a man who was more familiar to Syrian TV viewers than anybody other than President Bashar al-Assad".

The LCC reported 181 people killed, including 90 in Damascus and its suburbs.

=== 22 March ===
The LCC reported 100 people killed, including 28 in the Damascus suburbs.

=== 23 March ===
An IDF jeep was hit by stray gunfire from the Syrian-controlled side of the Golan Heights, no casualties.

The LCC reported 76 people killed, including 25 in the Damascus suburbs.

=== 24 March ===
The LCC reported 139 people killed, including 75 in the Damascus suburbs.

=== 25 March ===
Rebel leader Riad al-Asaad was injured by a bomb that was directed at a car he was in.

The LCC reported 102 people killed, including 33 in the Damascus suburbs.

=== 26 March ===
The Arab League summit begins in Qatar, Doha. The Syrian opposition (the National Coalition) takes Syria's official seat summit in Doha, Qatar. The National Coalition delegation is led by Moaz al-Khatib, who has offered to resign as the head of the Coalition. The Syria conflict is a key issue of the summit.

The LCC reported 154 people killed, including 48 in the Damascus suburbs.

=== 27 March ===
The Syrian opposition opens its first embassy, in Qatar.

The LCC reported 104 people killed, including 43 in the Damascus suburbs.

=== 28 March ===
Syrian rebels have claimed, in a statement, that they shot down an Iranian cargo plane landing at Damascus Airport.

The LCC reported 141 people were killed, including 51 in Damascus and its suburbs.

=== 29 March ===
The LCC reported 150 people killed, including 52 in the Damascus suburbs.

=== 30 March ===
The LCC reported 114 people killed, including 48 in the Damascus suburbs.

=== 31 March ===
In Deir al-Zour, three oil wells were destroyed leading to the destruction of 52 cubic meters of natural gas and 4,670 barrels of oil according to state media.

The LCC reported 146 people killed, including 97 in the Damascus suburbs.

== April 2013 ==
=== 1 April ===
The LCC reported 146 people killed, including 55 in the Damascus suburbs.

March has been the bloodiest month of the Syrian civil war with 6,000 deaths according to the Syrian Observatory for Human Rights.

=== 2 April ===
The LCC reported 113 people killed, including 58 in the Damascus suburbs.

=== 3 April ===
The LCC reported 130 people killed, including 48 in Aleppo and 40 in the Damascus suburbs.

=== 4 April ===
The LCC reported 79 people killed, including 31 in Aleppo and 21 in the Damascus suburbs.

=== 5 April - Friday of refugees ===
The LCC reported 83 people killed, including 48 in the Damascus suburbs.

=== 6 April ===
The LCC said that Syrian troops shelled the Damascus neighborhood of Baraza with Toshka surface-to-surface missiles. The attack comes a few days after same missiles were used on Yarmuk camp.

The LCC reported 116 people killed, including 37 in Aleppo and 34 in the Damascus suburbs.

=== 7 April ===
The LCC reported 151 people killed, including 48 in the Damascus suburbs.

=== 8 April ===
The LCC reported 79 people killed, including 34 in the Damascus suburbs.

=== 9 April ===
The LCC reported 113 people killed, including 23 in the Damascus suburbs.

=== 10 April ===
Activists including the LCC reported that the Syrian army committed a massacre of at least 42 people in the Daraa town of Sanamayn.

By the end of the day the LCC reported 154 people killed, including 63 in the Daraa province and 44 in the Damascus suburbs.

=== 11 April ===
The LCC reported 149 people killed, including 41 in Homs.

=== 12 April - Friday of "Syria is stronger than those who divide it" ===
The LCC reported 119 people killed, including 47 in the Damascus suburbs.

=== 13 April ===
The Times reports that evidence smuggled out of Syria indicates the use of chemical weapons in the ongoing conflict.

Nerve gas was reported as being used in the majority Kurdish Sheikh Maqsood area of Aleppo. An anonymous doctor reported that the attack had the signs of nerve gas leaving three dead and a dozen wounded. 1,500 doses of atropine were used with a further 2,000 being sent in by aid agencies. Atropine is a recognised antidote to nerve gases.

The LCC reported 115 people killed, including 32 in the Idlib province.

=== 14 April ===
The LCC reported 124 people killed, including 34 in the Damascus suburbs.

=== 15 April ===
The LCC reported 75 people killed, including 47 in the Damascus suburbs.

=== 16 April ===
The LCC reported 119 people killed, including 49 in Aleppo.

For the first time in months, a truce in Aleppo came into effect, allowing Red Crescent workers to collect bodies from the front line. Remains of 31 people were retrieved from the rubble.

=== 17 April ===
The LCC reported 157 civilians and rebels were killed, including 75 in the Damascus suburbs, most due to Syrian army artillery shelling on civilian houses. The Committees have documented 296 points of bombing in various Syrian cities and towns. Aviation bombardments by warplanes counted in 16 points in various regions. 112 pro-government troops were also killed.

=== 18 April ===
The FSA took control of Al-Dab'a Air Base near the city of Al Qusayr. Meanwhile, the Syrian army took control over the town of Abel in Homs governorate. The SOHR director described the Army takeover of the town by saying that it will hamper rebel movements between Al Qusayr and Homs city. According to him, the capture of the airport would have relieved the pressure on the rebels in the area, but their loss of Abel made the situation more complicated.

Saleh Muslim, head of the Kurdish Democratic Union Party (PYD), said a recent wave of Syrian army attacks on Kurdish towns may have been prompted by non-aggression pacts reached between Kurds and some moderate factions in the rebel forces.

Israel's prime minister Netanyahu declined to rule out the possibility of providing arms to Syrian rebel groups, saying that the decision of whether to intervene in the neighboring civil war is a "complicated question."

The LCC reported 111 civilians and rebel fighters were killed by government forces, including 53 in the Damascus suburbs.

=== 19 April ===
The LCC reported 138 civilians and rebel fighters were killed, including 26 children. Most of the dead were reported killed by the Syrian army's artillery shelling. 56 of the 138 were killed in the Damascus suburbs.

=== 20 April ===
Government troops captured the village of Radwaniyeh, near Al Qusayr, tightening the siege of the city. Meanwhile, the Syrian army was pressing to take full control of the town of Jdaidet al-Fadl, southwest of Damascus, where rebels entered the town four days prior. 69 people were killed in a four-day battle, most of them rebels.

The LCC reported 82 civilians and rebel fighters killed, including 28 in the Damascus suburbs.

=== 21 April ===
The Syrian Army captured Jdaidet al-Fadl, amid opposition claims of a massacre being committed. SOHR stated 250 people were killed since the start of the battle for Jdaidet al-Fadl, five days prior, with them being able to document, by name, 80 of the dead, including 19 rebels. Another opposition claim put the death toll at 450. The LCC reported 450 people were killed in the battle for the town, 300 of them civilians and 150 rebels.

Locals and activists in Damascus report that the Syrian Army killed at least 100 people in the suburb of Jdeit al-Fadel.

By the end of the day the LCC reported 566 people killed in total throughout Syria.

=== 22 April ===
The European Union eases an oil trade embargo it imposed on Syria during the early stages of the civil war to help the finances of the opposition; European companies will now be able to import crude oil and petroleum products from opposition-held areas, where approved by the opposition National Coalition.

The LCC reported 106 people killed, including 47 in the Damascus suburbs.

=== 23 April ===
The LCC reported 136 people killed, including 53 in the Damascus suburbs.

=== 24 April ===
The LCC reported 124 people killed, including 27 in the Damascus suburbs and 27 in Aleppo.

=== 25 April ===
The United States Secretary of Defence Chuck Hagel claims that US intelligence has concluded "with some degree of varying confidence" that the Government of Syria has used sarin gas during the past two years in the civil war, echoing previous statements from Britain, France, and Israel.

The LCC reported 124 people killed, including 51 in the Damascus suburbs.

=== 26 April ===
The LCC reported 139 people killed, including 29 in the Damascus suburbs.

=== 27 April ===
The LCC reported 152 people killed, including 60 in the Damascus suburbs.

=== 28 April ===
The LCC reported 120 people killed, including 32 in Aleppo and 21 in the Damascus suburbs.

=== 29 April ===
Two surface to air missiles were fired at a Russian charter jet belonging to Nordwind Airlines. The plane was carrying 159 people, the pilots took evasive action and the plane continued onto Kazan undamaged.

The LCC reported 119 people killed, including 36 in the Damascus suburbs and 34 in Aleppo.

=== 30 April ===
A bomb explodes in Damascus, killing 13 and wounding 70. SOHR accounted for 9 civilian and 3 security forces casualties.

The LCC reported 173 people killed, including 53 in the Hama governorate and 49 in Damascus and its suburbs. Among the dead were 6 women, 9 children, and 14 killed under torture. The LCC documented 347 points of artillery shelling.
