= Khan al-Assal massacre =

Massacre during the Syrian Civil War

- Part of the Syrian Civil War
- Location: Khan al-Assal, Aleppo, Syria
- Date: 22 July 2013
- Deaths: 51 soldiers (opposition claim); 123, majority civilian (regime claim)
- Perpetrators: Al-Nusra Front and Ansar al-Khilafah

The Khan al-Assal Massacre (Arabic: مجزرة خان العسل, romanized: Majzara Ḵān al-ʿAsal) was committed during the Syrian Civil War by Syrian rebels after the capture of Khan al-Assal, a town about 14 kilometers west of the city of Aleppo, by the armed opposition on 22 July 2013. Opposition activists attributed the massacre to the jihadist group Al-Nusra Front – then al-Qaeda's main Syrian branch – and the Ansar al-Khilafa Brigade, and said that 51 government soldiers who had surrendered had been executed. Government media said that Islamists including the al-Khalifa Brigade had killed 123 people, the majority of them civilians.

== Background ==
Rebels had for months tried to take Khan al-Assal, a strategically located town in the west of Aleppo province. It finally fell into rebel hands on 22 July, but fighting continued on its edges the next day, according to the Syrian Observatory for Human Rights (SOHR). During the clashes, a captured T-55 tank was seen in use by the rebels.

At least 150 Syrian army soldiers died in the fighting with rebels for the control of the town in the northern Aleppo province.

Khan al-Assal had been the site of the Khan al-Assal chemical attack on 19 March 2013, in which government soldiers and civilians were killed by sarin gas.

== Massacre ==
According to the Syrian Observatory for Human Rights (SOHR), an opposition group, 51 Syrian soldiers were executed by rebels after the fall of Khan al-Assal, while another hundred had died during the battle. The SOHR posted a video online which according to the New York Times "showed what appeared to be an execution ground, with dozens of lifeless bodies clumped against a wall pockmarked with bullet holes". Citing unnamed witnesses, the SOHR held members of the Al-Nusra Front and Ansar al-Khilafah responsible, saying that the fighters had executed most of the government soldiers who had surrendered. Videos posted by the Ansar al-Khalifah Brigade show some of the men killed in civilian clothing, and some of the bodies mutilated. The Al-Nusra Front confirmed its participation in the battle and said that 150 pro-government forces had been killed in it, but did not claim responsibility for the executions.

The government-owned Syrian Arab News Agency (SANA) reported on 27 July that the death toll was 123 people, the majority of them civilians – with others still missing.

== Reactions ==
=== Domestic reaction ===
- Ba'athist Syria - Minister of Information Omran al-Zoubi stated that "terrorists who committed the Khan al-Assal massacre and the countries supporting them will be held accountable and pay dearly."

== See also ==
- List of massacres in Syria
