= List of massacres in Roman Judea =

The following is a list of massacres that have occurred in Roman Judea prior to the establishment of the Roman province of Syria Palæstina.

Name	Date	Location	Responsible Party	Deaths	Notes
Massacre during the Samaritan Revolt (36 AD)	36 AD	Mount Gerizim	Pontius Pilate and Romans	Unknown number of Samaritans	The Samaritans rebelled against the Romans in 36 CE. A fanatic assembled them at Mount Gerizim, promising to reveal the sacred vessels which they had been taught were buried there by Moses, and the rebels were ruthlessly massacred by order of Pontius Pilate.
Massacre during the First Jewish-Roman War	67 AD	Mount Gerizim	Roman troops	11,600 Samaritans and Jews	This rout constituted a disaster for the Samaritan community.

== See also ==
- List of massacres in Ottoman Syria
- List of killings and massacres in Mandatory Palestine
- List of massacres in Syria
- Killings and massacres during the 1948 Palestine War
- List of massacres in Israel
- List of massacres in Palestinian Territories
- List of massacres during the Syrian Civil War
