= Basha'ir al-Nasr Brigade =

Group in the Syrian civil war

- لواء بشائر النصر

The Basha'ir al-Nasr Brigade (Arabic: لواء بشائر النصر, meaning the signs of victory Brigade), was an opposition group active in the Syrian Civil War. According to the Russian UN ambassador Vitaly Churkin, the group was affiliated with the Free Syrian Army and was known to produce rocket-propelled unguided missiles in the north of Syria.

== The Khan al-Assal chemical attack ==
On 19 March 2013, a rocket filled with sarin was used in the Khan al-Assal chemical attack. According to the Syrian Observatory for Human Rights the attack resulted in at least 26 fatalities (including 16 government soldiers and 10 civilians), and more than 86 injuries. A Russian investigation team that obtained samples in Khan al-Asal from 23 to 25 March 2013, found evidence that the rocket used in the attack was an artisan-type similar in type and parameters to the Basha'ir-3 unguided rockets, made by the Basha'ir al-Nasr Brigade since February 2013.

== Basha’ir al-Nasr in Deir ez-Zor ==
According to Foreign Policy, the group, a part of the group, or a group with a similar name was based in Deir ez-Zor. According to Fars News, a number of the group's members were killed in the Al Meri'iyaeh area southeast of the Deir ez-Zor Airport on 6 July 2013.

== See also ==
- List of armed groups in the Syrian Civil War
