= 2024 Ayn Issa attack =

Turkish drone strike on civilian family in Syria

- Part of Operation Dawn of Freedom during the Syrian civil war
- Location: Al-Mustariha, Raqqa Governorate, Syria
- Date: 8 December 2024; Around 11:00 p.m. (AST)
- Attack type: Drone strike, massacre
- Deaths: 11, including 6 children (SOHR)
- Perpetrator: Turkish Armed Forces

On the night of 8 December 2024, a Turkish drone strike targeted a residential structure in Al-Mustariha village in Raqqa Governorate, killing eleven members of a single family, which included six children. (SOHR) The civilian mass casualty event contributed to considerable panic among the local population in areas held by Autonomous Administration of North and East Syria regarding military escalation in the region with the onset of Operation Dawn of Freedom and the 2024 Manbij offensive conducted by the pro-Turkish Syrian National Army (SNA) against Syrian Democratic Forces (SDF) positions. These airstrikes took places in three provinces: Al-Hasakah Governorate (140 strikes killed 3 Syrian soldiers, 24 military personnel, and 6 civilians, including one woman), Raqqa Governorate (7 strikes resulted in the deaths of 4 military personnel and 11 civilians) and Rural Aleppo (45 strikes killed 4 military personnel and 3 civilians).

== Background ==
Through 2024, Turkish forces conducted 191 documented drone strikes across northern Syria based on statistics cited by the Syrian Observatory for Human Rights. These operations resulted in 55 fatalities and caused injuries to 49 military personnel and 73 civilians, including six women and three children. The casualty figures included 32 Autonomous Administration military personnel, three Syrian Arab Armed Forces troops, and 20 civilians, among them one woman.

Following the capture of Tell Rifaat, the Turkish-backed Syrian National Army (SNA) announced a military campaign targeting Manbij, a strategic city in the eastern Aleppo countryside. The opposition's military operations occurred as part of Operation Dawn of Freedom simultaneously with Operation Deterrence of Aggression, which advanced from Idlib toward Homs.

== Drone strike ==
On 8 December 2024 at 11:00 p.m. AST, a Turkish drone strike targeted a residential structure in Al-Mustariha village, located in the Ayn Issa countryside north of Raqqa. The attack resulted in the deaths of twelve members of a single family, six of which were children and several of whom were women.

The attack contributed to already-present panic among the local population in areas held by Autonomous Administration of North and East Syria regarding military escalation in the region and the increase in drone strikes in civilian areas.

== See also ==
- Killing of Hevrin Khalaf
- Missing women of Afrin
