= List of massacres in Ottoman Syria =

The following is the List of massacres in Ottoman Syria, mass atrocities committed during the Ottoman rule in Syrian provinces (region roughly corresponding the Levant) between 1517 and 1918.

- For massacres that took place in Roman Judea, see List of massacres in Roman Judea
- For massacres that took place in the Mandatory Palestine, see List of killings and massacres in Mandatory Palestine.
- For massacres that took place in modern Syria, see List of massacres in Syria.
- For massacres that took place during the 1948 Palestine War, see Killings and massacres during the 1948 Palestine War.
- For massacres that have occurred in Israel following its declaration of independence, see List of massacres in Israel.
- For massacres that have occurred in the West Bank and the Gaza Strip since 1967, see List of massacres in Palestinian Territories.
- For massacres that have occurred during the Syrian Civil War since 2011, see List of massacres during the Syrian Civil War.

Name	Date	Location	Responsible Party	Deaths	Notes
1517 Hebron attacks	1517	Hebron	Turkish soldiers	Unknown	Jews were attacked, beaten, and raped, and many were killed in their homes
Massacre of the Telal	1517	Aleppo	Turkish soldiers upon Selim I's order	9,400	Fatwas issued against the Nusayris (or 'Alawites') that declared them infidels. Around 9,400 Nusayris who assembled in Aleppo were all executed.
1517 Safed attacks	1517	Safed	Mamluk supporters	Unknown	Many Jews subsequently fled the city
1757 Hajj caravan raid	September-October 1757	Qatraneh	Bedouin highwaymen		~20,000 Hajjis killed or died of starvation/thirst
Siege of Jaffa	7 March 1799	Jaffa	Napoleon's Army	2,440–4,100	Ottoman prisoners were executed on the beaches south of the town. Many of the civilian population of the town were also killed.
1834 Hebron pogrom	1834	Hebron	Egyptian troops	Over 500	Egyptian soldiers did not distinguish between inhabitants; for three hours, troops plundered, killed, raped and maimed Hebronites both Muslim and Jewish.
1834 Safed pogrom	1834	Safed	Arab rioters	unknown	Reports detail torture and mass-rape of Jewish population
Aleppo Massacre	October to November 1850	Aleppo	Muslim rioters	5,000	Attacks on Christian neighborhoods in Aleppo
1860 Druze-Maronite massacre	July 9–11, 1860	Damascus	Druze and Sunni Muslim paramilitary groups	25,000	Organized pogroms against Maronite Christians; 326 villages, 560 churches, 28 colleges, 42 convents, and 9 other religious establishments were completely destroyed
Tafas massacre	September 17, 1918	Tafas	Ottoman army	250	Ottoman Army perform a massacre of civilians upon retreat in order to demoralize French and British troops, as well as their allies.
Surafend massacre	December 10, 1918	Sarafand al-Amar	ANZAC Mounted Division	50	New Zealander Troop from the Australian and New Zealand Army Corps massacred the town after one of their officers was murdered by a local.

== See also ==
- List of massacres in Syria
