= Ansar al-Sharia (Syria) =

Joint operations room of Sunni Islamist and Salafist factions

- أنصار الشريعة
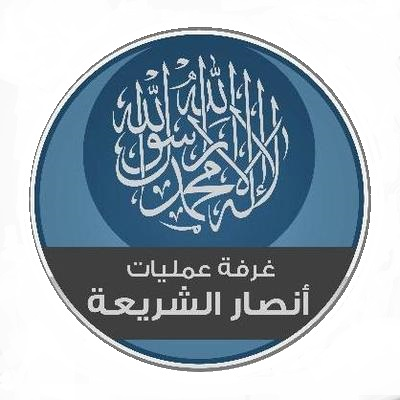
- Dates active: 2 July 2015–3 February 2016
- Dissolved: February 2016
- Headquarters: Aleppo
- Active regions: Aleppo Governorate, Syria
- Ideology: Sunni Islamism: Salafist jihadism (some groups)
- Wars: the Syrian Civil War

Ansar al-Sharia (Arabic: أنصار الشريعة, lit. 'Partisans of Islamic Law') was a joint operations room of Sunni Islamist and Salafi jihadist factions that operate in Aleppo, Syria. Its stated aim is seizing the city of Aleppo from the Syrian government in order to administer the city under Sharia law on the basis of a joint charter.

In an October 2015 publication, the Washington D.C.–based Institute for the Study of War considered Ansar al-Sharia as one of the "powerbrokers" in Aleppo Governorate, being primarily "anti-regime" but not necessarily "anti-ISIS".

== Participants ==
As of October 2015, the following groups participate in the operations room:

- Al-Nusra Front
- Ansar al-Din Front
- Supporters of the Caliphate Brigade
- Ahrar ash-Sham
- 1st Regiment
- Mujahideen of Islam Movement
- Dawn of the Caliphate Brigades
- Saraya al-Mee’ad
- Companions Battalion
- Soldiers of God Battalion

== See also ==
- Fatah Halab
- List of armed groups in the Syrian Civil War
