= Surafend massacre =

1918 massacre in Palestine by Allied troops

- Part of the Sinai and Palestine campaign
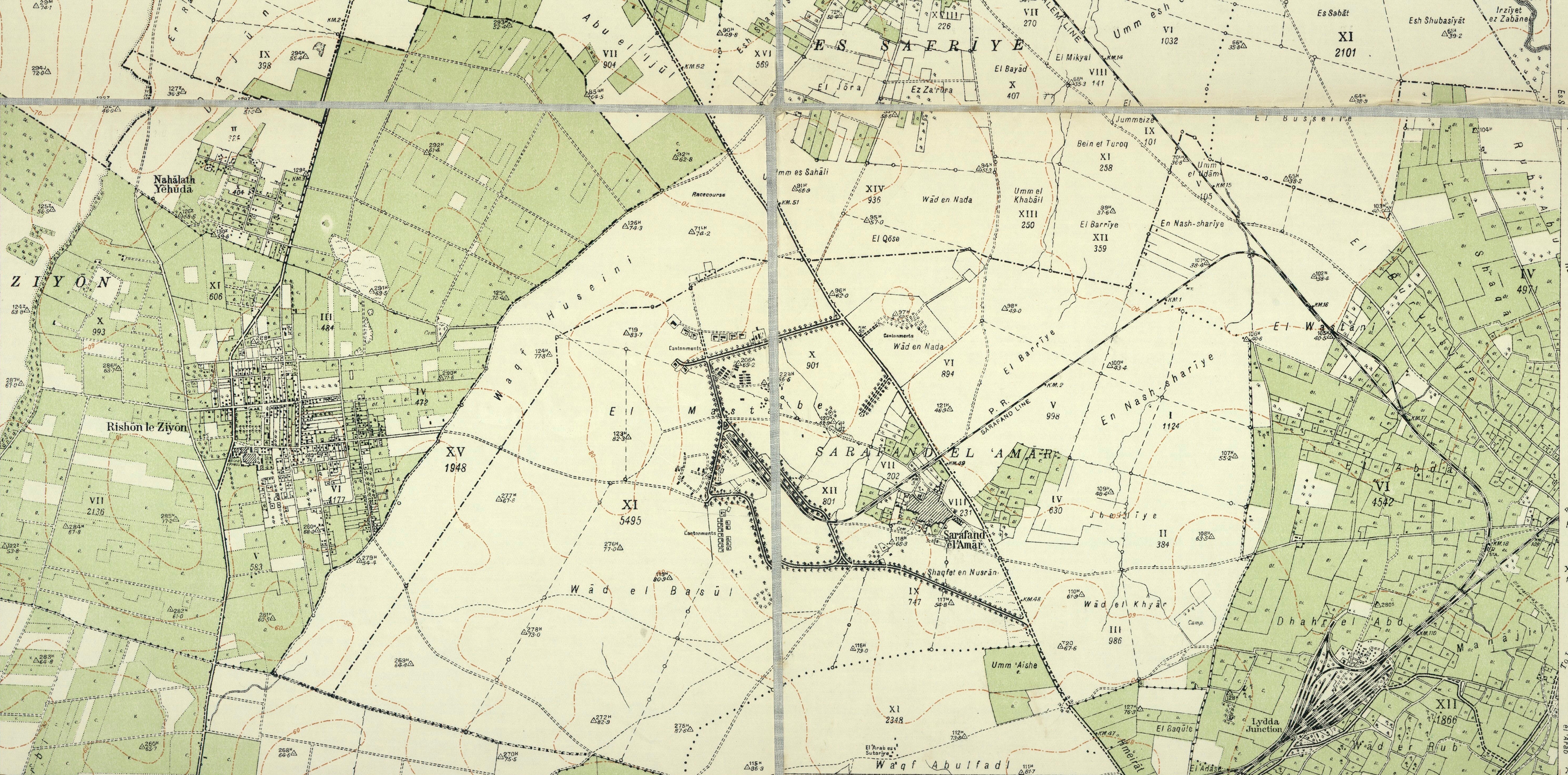
- A map of Sarafand al-Amar
- Location: 31°57′31″N 34°50′20″E; Sarafand al-Amar (modern-day Tzrifin, Israel)
- Date: 10 December 1918
- Target: Male Palestinian villagers
- Attack type: Massacre
- Deaths: 40–137
- Perpetrators: ANZAC Mounted Division; Scottish soldiers
- Motive: Reprisal for thefts and a soldier's murder

The Surafend massacre (Arabic: مجزرة صرفند) was a premeditated massacre committed against inhabitants of the village of Sarafand al-Amar (modern-day Tzrifin) and a Bedouin camp in Ottoman Palestine by occupying Australian, New Zealand and Scottish soldiers on 10 December 1918. The massacre occurred after the Sinai and Palestine campaign of World War I, Allied occupational forces in the region, in particular Australian and New Zealand troops, grew frustrated over being subject to petty theft and an alleged murder by local Arabs without redress.

On the night of 9 December, a New Zealand soldier named Leslie Lowry was killed by a thief who had stolen his kitbag. Lowry died without speaking. Troops found evidence near his body, including a piece of Arabic clothing and, allegedly, footprints leading towards Surafend. In response, around 200 ANZAC troops massacred its male inhabitants and burned down the village. No one was ever prosecuted for the massacre.

== Background ==
During the Sinai and Palestine campaign of World War I, Allied forces gradually pushed the Ottoman military out of the Middle East. In 1918, the ANZAC Mounted Division, consisting of the New Zealand Mounted Rifles Brigade and the Australian 1st and 2nd Light Horse Brigades, made camp near the village of Sarafand al-Amar in Palestine. The proximity of the village, coupled with a perceived general British Army acceptance and dismissal of petty crime by the local Arabs, meant that thefts and even murders took place regularly with minimal to no redress from the Imperial forces. The reluctance of the British to punish or avenge such crimes led to a buildup of resentment among the occupying forces towards both local residents and their own British commanders.

== Massacre ==
On the night of 9 December 1918, a New Zealand soldier, Trooper Leslie Lowry, was woken around midnight when his kitbag, which he was using as a pillow, was stolen from his tent. Lowry pursued the thief outside the camp and was apparently shot. Corporal C. H. Carr heard the sound of a struggle and a cry for help. He found Lowry lying in the sand about 40 metres (44 yd) from the tent lines, bleeding from a bullet wound to the chest. Lowry died at about 1:30 a.m. on Tuesday 10 December, as a doctor arrived. He had said nothing. The camp was roused, and a group of New Zealand soldiers followed the alleged footprints of the thief, which ended about 91 metres (100 yd) before the village of Surafend. In a letter written in 1936, Trooper Ambrose Stephen Mulhall of the 1st Australian Light Horse Regiment, thought Lowry told his fellow soldiers that "before he died the thief and his murderer was a Bedouin and that he had gone to the Bedouin [Arab] village".

Soldiers set up a cordon around the village, and ordered its sheikhs to surrender the murderer. The sheikhs denied any knowledge of the incident or its perpetrator. The division’s staff were told of the death the following day. Major Magnus Johnson conducted a court of inquiry at first light. Plaster casts of the footprints were taken, and the bullet that killed Lowry was determined to have been fired by a Colt .45 pistol, which was not on general issue to New Zealand Mounted Rifles (NZMR) troops, but was common amongst Turkish and Arab forces. By nightfall, no decision had been made on what action, if any, to take. According to the police report, there was no evidence linking anyone from the village to the murder. The police report states:

At 0930 on the 10th December 1918 the Police commenced to search the Village and found no trace whatsoever of the culprit, or even any other individual suspected of the crime. The only material clue was that of a Native Cap (similar to headgear worn by Bedouins) which was picked up by a mate of the deceased, and handed to me by Captain Cobb. This was found on the scene where the Soldier was shot and killed.

The following day, the men of the NZMR prepared for what was to take place that night. Early in the evening, around two hundred soldiers entered the village, expelling some of the women and children, while others remained. Armed with heavy sticks and bayonets, the soldiers then set upon the remaining villagers while burning the houses. Between 40 and 137 people were killed in the attack on Surafend and the outlying Bedouin camp. The figure depends on the testimony of the reporting authority. There is no certain figure. Many suggest around 40. The only account that claims to have counted the bodies is a letter from A. S. Mulhall, which gives a death toll of 137. An unknown number of injured villagers were treated by field ambulance units.

== Aftermath ==
The massacre was visible and audible to the nearby division headquarters. The division's Commander-in-Chief, General Sir Edmund Allenby, was ordered by General Headquarters to find and discipline those who took part in the killings, in particular those who led and organised the attack. The New Zealanders stood firm and refused to name any individual soldiers responsible, and thus no one could be definitively charged and disciplined for the massacre.

Allenby ordered the division to the square at headquarters. There he ignored the salute of its Commanding Officer Chaytor and expressed his fury at their actions. He used strong language, including calling them "cowards and murderers". According to Henry Gullett''s Official History of Australia in the War of 1914–1918, the division was fully expecting harsh military discipline for the massacre, and would have accepted this without resentment. However, Allenby's outburst, while leaving them unpunished, fuelled great resentment and bitterness that their commanding officer would speak of the brigades in such a manner. The feeling in the division intensified when Allenby withdrew his awards recommendations for its members and said nothing to them over the following year. In June 1919, an Australian journalist informed Allenby of the resentment in the division following his outburst. He subsequently wrote a farewell tribute to the Australian Light Horse troops, thanking them for their work in Palestine and Syria.

No one was charged for the massacre, but £2060 11s 3d (£79,600 in 2025) was paid to authorities in Palestine to rebuild the village. The British government contributed £686, due to a small number of Scottish soldiers who had participated. In 1921, it requested that Australia and New Zealand contribute the remaining two-thirds. Australia did not contest its liability and quickly paid £515 2s 9d to Britain. New Zealand objected but eventually, under British pressure, paid £858 11s 5d in May 1921.

== Australian involvement ==
At the time the destruction of Surafend was occurring, the YMCA was screening a movie which was watched by many men of the Anzac Mounted Division. On hearing reports about the fighting, the Anzac Mounted Division Headquarters ordered the division to "stand to" with an immediate roll call to be taken and every man's location accounted for at that moment. The result of this roll call was that the location of most Australians were accounted for. In addition to the rolls, police pickets surrounded the village, finding many Australians viewing the burning houses. These were ordered back to their units. No police report indicated the presence of Australian soldiers in the village.

That being so, involvement of Australian soldiers in the massacre at Surafend had been assumed, but never proven. Historian Gullett's volume of the Official History of Australia in the War of 1914–1918 mentioned that New Zealand troops had conducted the massacre and the destruction of the village, but with the "hearty support" and "full sympathy" of the Australians.

In 2009, journalist Paul Daley while undertaking research for his book, Beersheba discovered an audio recording in the archives of the Australian War Memorial in which Australian former Light Horseman Ted O'Brien described how he and his comrades had "had a good issue of rum" and "went through [the village] with a bayonet." O'Brien described the actions he and his fellow Australians took as "ungodly" and "a real bad thing".

== See also ==
- Military history of New Zealand
- Gaza War Cemetery
- List of massacres in Ottoman Syria
- List of massacres in Palestine
