= Kafr Saghir massacre =

- Part of Syrian civil war
- Location: Kafr Saghir, east of Aleppo, Syria
- Date: 20 March 2016
- Target: Kurdish and Arab Shi'a civilians
- Attack type: Massacre
- Deaths: 20
- Perpetrator: ISIS

The Kafr Saghir massacre (Kurdish: Komkujiya Kefêr Sixîrê) refers to the killing of at least 20 civilians by ISIS militants in the village of Kafr Saghir, located east of Aleppo, Syria, on 20 March 2016. The attack primarily targeted civilians from the Shi'a minority, further exacerbating sectarian tensions in the region.

== Background ==
Kafr Saghir is a small village with a predominantly Shi'a population, making it a target during ISIS's broader campaign of sectarian violence in Syria. The village lies near the strategic city of Aleppo, which witnessed intense fighting throughout the Syrian civil war. ISIS forces launched the attack shortly after reopening a route to the village, which had been blocked during earlier clashes in the area.

== Massacre ==
On the morning of 20 March 2016, ISIS fighters entered Kafr Saghir and systematically killed at least 20 villagers, including women and children. Eyewitness reports indicated that the attackers targeted homes and public spaces, leaving behind scenes of significant destruction.

The massacre was part of a pattern of ISIS atrocities aimed at intimidating communities and solidifying control in contested areas. Local sources reported that the attackers used brutal methods, emphasizing the sectarian nature of the assault.

== Aftermath ==
Following the massacre, survivors and families of the victims called for international intervention to hold ISIS accountable. Activists highlighted the failure of local and international forces to protect vulnerable communities in the region.

== See also ==
- Syrian civil war
- List of massacres in Syria
