= Hatla massacre =

Mass murder in 2013

- Part of the Syrian civil war
- Location: Hatla, Deir ez-Zor Governorate, Syria
- Date: 11 June 2013
- Attack type: Massacre
- Deaths: 30–60
- Victim: Shia villagers
- Perpetrators: Free Syrian Army; Al-Nusra Front
- Motive: Sectarian

The Hatla massacre was the killing of 30 to 60 Shia villagers, including some who were armed, conducted by Syrian opposition fighters and Salafist Al-Nusra Front members in the eastern Syrian village of Hatla, near Deir ez-Zor, on 11 June 2013 during the Syrian civil war. At least 30 of the dead were civilians. According to a UN report, 30 people were killed.

A video posted online on 11 June, entitled "The storming and cleansing of Hatla", showed fighters waving the black Salafi flag and celebrating. The language used in the videos is sectarian. "This is the Shia, this is the Shia carcass, this is their end," the cameraman says. That video "indicates those responsible were non-Syrians, possibly from Kuwait."

According to opposition activists, most of the dead were pro-government fighters but civilians were killed as well, including women and children. Three Shia clerics were also among the dead. Reports said that 30 civilians were killed. Syrian opposition forces also burned civilian houses and a Shia shrine during the takeover. 10 rebel fighters were killed during the attack. 150 Shia residents fled to the nearby government-held village of Jafra.
