= Molhem Barakat =

Syrian photojournalist (1995–2013)

Molhem Barakat (8 March 1995 in Aleppo – 20 December 2013 in Aleppo) was a Syrian photojournalist who covered the Syrian Civil War for Reuters. He was killed in 2013 during the Battle of Aleppo.

== Career ==
Barakat began working as a photojournalist for the Reuters news agency in May 2013. His age in December of that year is quoted as 17 or 18, possibly making him a minor at the time.

== Death ==
Barakat was killed on 20 December 2013 during the battle to control the al-Kindi Hospital in Aleppo, alongside his brother, a Syrian rebel. Reuters was widely criticized for sending an "inexperienced teenager" into a war zone. A photograph of Barakat's bloodstained camera was distributed by the Aleppo Media Center.
