= Khan al-Assal chemical attack =

2013 chemical weapons attack during the Syrian Civil War

- Part of the Syrian civil war
- Location: The impact point: 36°10′02″N 37°02′21″E; Khan al-Asal, Aleppo, Syria
- Date: 19 March 2013
- Target: Unknown
- Attack type: Chemical attack
- Weapon: Rocket filled with sarin
- Deaths: Various numbers: at least 26 (SOHR); 20 (Syrian government)
- Injuries: Various numbers: more than 86 (SOHR); 124 (Syrian government)
- Perpetrator: Unknown

The Khan al-Assal chemical attack was a chemical attack in Khan al-Assal, Aleppo, Syria on 19 March 2013, which according to the Syrian Observatory for Human Rights resulted in at least 26 fatalities including 16 government soldiers and 10 civilians, and more than 86 injuries. Immediately after the incident, the Syrian government and opposition accused each other of carrying out the attack, but neither side presented clear documentation. The Syrian government asked the United Nations to investigate the incident, but disputes over the scope of that investigation led to lengthy delays. In the interim, the Syrian government invited Russia to send specialists to investigate the incident. Samples taken at the site led them to conclude that the attack involved the use of sarin, which matched the assessment made by the United States. Russia held the opposition responsible for the attack, while the US held the government responsible. UN investigators finally arrived on the ground in Syria in August (with a mandate excluding the evaluation of culpability for the chemical weapons attacks), but their arrival coincided with the much larger-scale 2013 Ghouta attacks which took place on 21 August, pushing the Khan al-Assal investigation "onto the backburner" according to a UN spokesman. The UN report, which was completed on 12 December, found "likely use of chemical weapons in Khan al-Assal" and assessed that organophosphate poisoning was the cause of the "mass intoxication".

A February 2014 report from the UN Human Rights Council stated that the chemical agents used in the Khan-Al-Assal attack bore the "same unique hallmarks" as those used in the 2013 Ghouta attacks. The UN report also indicated that the perpetrators of the Al-Ghouta attack "likely had access to the chemical weapons stockpile of the Syrian military". In neither incident, however, was the commission's "evidentiary threshold" met in regard to identifying the perpetrators of the chemical attacks.

Laboratories working for the Organisation for the Prohibition of Chemical Weapons compared samples taken by a UN mission in the Damascus suburb of Ghouta after the Aug. 21, 2013 attack, when hundreds of civilians died of sarin gas poisoning, to chemicals handed over by Damascus for destruction in 2014. The tests found “markers” in samples taken at Ghouta and at the sites of two other nerve agent attacks, in the towns of Khan Sheikhoun in Idlib governorate on April 4, 2017, and Khan al-Assal, Aleppo, in March 2013. “We compared Khan Sheikhoun, Khan al-Assal, Ghouta,” said one source who asked not to be named because of the sensitivity of the findings. “There were signatures in all three of them that matched.”

== Background ==
The attack took place in Khan al-Asal, in the context of the Syrian civil war, in the Battle of Aleppo's southwestern front. Khan al-Asal is a village about 12 kilometers (7.5 mi) west-southwest of the center of Aleppo.

At the time of the chemical attack on 19 March, government forces held the village and the nearby Syrian Army Base. Rebel forces had been shelling the village from the surrounding areas for weeks, and had gained control of the police academy located 3 kilometers (1.9 mi) southwest of Khan al-Asal.

The rebel forces had taken control of the police academy at the conclusion of a fierce eight-day battle that concluded on 3 March, when the last government defenders of the police academy were killed. According to the Syrian Observatory for Human Rights (SOHR), at least 120 government soldiers/policemen and 80 rebels were killed during the battle.

== Incident ==
The incident took place in the early morning of 19 March 2013. Between seven and half past seven, an object filled with sarin landed in Khan al-Asal. The rocket landed near a living quarter with farming areas around the houses, and released sarin gas on its impact. The gas drifted southwest with the wind into the Haret al-Mazar neighborhood, wounded 124 persons and killed 20 along with an unspecified number of animals. Several witnesses reported seeing people scratching their bodies and observed people lying in the streets. Some of the wounded were unconscious; some had convulsions and foamed from the mouth and some complained of vision problems.

Local civilians and Syrian army personnel rescued and evacuated those affected to six hospitals in the area, mainly the University Hospital in Aleppo. According to witness statements given to the UN investigation team, first responders were exposed to contamination from the chemical rocket. A Reuters photographer was quoted as saying that he had visited victims in Aleppo hospitals and that they had breathing problems; he also said that people had told him that the air smelled of chlorine after the attack.

== Initial claims ==
Both the opposition and the Syrian government claimed that a chemical attack was carried out in Khan al-Asal in the early morning of 19 March 2013.

=== Government claims ===
The first report came from the government-owned Syrian Arab News Agency (SANA), which reported that "terrorists" had fired a rocket "containing chemical materials" into the Khan al-Assal area, which landed 300 meters from a Syrian army position. The news agency displayed photographs of what it said were the victims, the impact point and remains of the rocket used. Later on the day, the Syrian government wrote an official letter to the United Nations stating that opposition forces had fired a chemical rocket, "from the Kafr Da'il area towards Khan al-Asal in Aleppo governorate, some 5 km away. The missile fell in a civilian-populated area, some 300 meters from a Syrian Arab army position". The UK Channel 4 reporter Alexander Thomson reported on 23 March that an anonymous Syrian military source had briefed him that artillery reports from the Syrian Army suggested that a small home-made rocket was fired from the vicinity of Al-Bab towards a military checkpoint at the entrance of Khan al-Asal. This rocket was said to contain "a form of chlorine known as CL17, easily available as a swimming pool cleaner", in the form of "gas, dissolved in saline solution." As others pointed out, this would amount to ordinary household bleach which is prepared by dissolving chlorine in sodium hydroxide solution.

In a subsequent report to the UN, the Ministry of Health of the Syrian Arab Republic described the symptoms of patients admitted to a local hospital as consisting of "unconsciousness, pupil contraction, neurological symptoms, rapid pulse, breathing irregularity, murmurs in lungs, and general weakness, in addition to a decrease in cholinesterase efficiency in patients' plasma".

=== Opposition claims ===
On the day of the attack, an activist from the Syrian Observatory for Human Rights (SOHR) said "16 government soldiers and 10 civilians had been killed after a rocket landed on Khan al-Assal". An activist, from the Khan al-Assal Freemen Brigade, said “The regime tried to target the liberated police academy with what is thought to be a scud missile, but the missile did not reach its intended target, and fell on the government controlled areas, where Assad forces are positioned”.

A rebel fighter from the Ansar Brigade told Reuters that a missile had hit the town at around 8 a.m., and that he had seen pink-tinged smoke rising after a powerful blast shook the area. He said: "We were about 2 km from the blast. It was incredibly loud and so powerful that everything in the room started falling over. When I finally got up to look at the explosion, I saw smoke with a pinkish-purple color rising up. I didn't smell anything, but I did not leave the building I was in," he said. "The missile, maybe a Scud, hit a regime area, praise God, and I'm sure that it was an accident. My brigade certainly does not have that capability and we've been talking to many units in the area, they all deny it." He said the explosion was quickly followed by an air strike. A fighter jet circled the police academy held by the rebels on the outskirts of Khan al-Assal and bombed the area, he said.

On the day of the attack, Qassim Saadeddine, a spokesman for the Free Syrian Armys Higher Military Council in Aleppo, told Reuters; "We were hearing reports from early this morning about a regime attack on Khan al-Assal, and we believe they fired a Scud with chemical agents". He later told TIME that “the regime is trying to hide its crime by accusing the FSA,” and accused the government of attacking its own people in order to smear the opposition.

Another rebel commander, Abdul Jabbar al-Oqaidi, said he had witnessed the attack. He described it as an errant strike on a government-controlled neighborhood by Syrian warplanes flying at high altitude. The explosions from the attack emitted a gas that appeared to cause suffocation, he said, and claimed that some victims had been treated in a rebel field hospital.

== Early commentaries ==
Some independent chemical weapons analysts, after studying initial intelligence reports and video coverage of survivors on state-run television, initially did not believe that the government or rebels had used advanced chemical weapons. Lack of burns, skin discoloration or quarantine measures were noted. The Syrian military appeared initially to believe that chlorine had been used, rather than an organophosphate.

One analyst (Bretton-Gordon) cautioned that conventional high explosives can also produce an odor which might be mistaken for chlorine, and that there was no indication from the images he had seen that the chemical agent had been used. While Jean Pascal Zanders, a chemical weapons expert and a senior research fellow for the EU Institute for Security Studies, cast doubt on the use of chlorine, saying that one small rocket couldn't deliver the quantity needed to kill 25 people.

== Russian investigation ==
A Russian investigation team obtained samples in Khan al-Asal from 23 to 25 March 2013. On 9 Jul, Vitaly Churkin, Russian UN ambassador, said Russian experts analyzed samples of material they collected from the site of the attack, at a Russian laboratory certified by the OPCW. The report that Russia submitted to UN concluded that sarin had been used in the chemical attack, and that the rebels were responsible for making the sarin and launching the attack. The report was not made public. The conclusions were summarized by Churkin in a press conference at the UN on 9 July. A summary of the report was posted on the Russian Foreign Ministry website on 4 September 2013 following the Ghouta chemical attack.

Churkin's presentation and the summary on the Russian Foreign Ministry's website made the following claims in support of its assertion that the attack was carried out by the opposition:

1. The projectile used in the incident “didn’t contain chemical stabilizers in the toxic substance,” and "does not belong to the standard ammunition of the Syrian army" and its bursting charge was RDX, which is "not used in standard chemical munitions".
2. Soil and projectile samples were found to contain sarin and diisopropyl fluorophosphate, which was "used by Western states for producing chemical weapons during World War II." The sarin had been produced recently in "cottage industry" conditions without the use of chemical stabilisers that would permit longer-term storage.

According to Churkin, “It was determined that on March 19 the rebels fired an unguided missile Bashair-3 at the town of Khan al-Assal, which has been under government control. The results of the analysis clearly show that the shell used in Khan al-Assal was not factory made and that it contained sarin”. According to Moscow, the manufacture of the ‘Bashair-3’ warheads started in February 2013, and was the work of the Basha'ir al-Nasr Brigade, a brigade with close ties to the Free Syrian Army. The Russian government has never released images of the munition used in the attack.

White House spokeswoman Caitlin Hayden said on 5 September 2013 that US officials had "studied the Russian report but ... found no reason to change our assessment" that the Syrian government was responsible for the attack.

The British Ambassador to the UN, Mark Lyall Grant, said that while it was "nice" that Syria allowed Russian investigators access to Khan al-Assal, it was "considerably more important that they give access to independent and credible U.N. investigators who are not directly involved in the conflict and who can be expected to produce a more impartial and credible report."

Some independent chemical weapons experts were also critical of the conclusions of the Russian report. Richard Guthrie, formerly project leader of the Chemical and Biological Warfare Project of the SIPRI, said that:

1. The use of a non-standard munition and the lower grade RDX used in the rocket would be likely if the Syrian "government was developing a semi-improvised short range rocket" and "if there happened to be a stock available".
2. The non-military grade makeup of the sarin might reflect only that "there are a lot of different ways to make sarin" or "be the result of an old sarin stock being used", and that degradation could explain the dirty mix described in the Russian report.

== UN / OPCW mission ==
The Syrian government asked the United Nations to investigate and reported that blood and soil samples had been collected and had been sent to the UN already.

The investigation mission is to look into the specific incident brought to my attention by the Syrian Government.

— The United Nations secretary-general Ban Ki-moon on a media conference 21 March 2013.

United Nations Secretary-General Ban Ki-Moon appointed Åke Sellström on 27 March 2013 to head a United Nations fact-finding mission to investigate the incident. However, disputes over the scope of the investigation (as the UN and others wanted to investigate other alleged incidents in Homs, Damascus and elsewhere, amidst increasing reports of chemical weapons use in Syria) led to lengthy delays as the Syrian government refused access to areas other than Khan al-Assal. There were also disputes over access to Syrian military sites, and over the exclusion of investigators from the permanent members of the UN Security Council, to which Russia objected. Russia and the United States accused each other of delaying the investigation. As a result of the delays the Syrian government asked Russia to conduct an investigation.

The New York Times reported on 10 June 2013, based on an interview with a Syrian-American paediatrician and an anonymous US government official, that the US government had been supplied with blood samples from victims of the Khan-al-Assal attack and that these had tested positive for sarin. On 14 June 2013 AP reported that it had obtained a letter from the US ambassador Susan Rice to the UN Secretary General stating the US government had concluded that sarin had been used by the Syrian government in the Khan al-Assal attack, and again in Aleppo on 13 April.

UN/OPCW investigators finally arrived on the ground in Syria on 18 August, after the Syrian government agreed to allow access to two other unspecified sites besides Khan al-Assal, but with a mandate limited to determining whether chemical weapons had been used and if so which ones, but not who had used them. The inspectors' arrival coincided with the much larger-scale 2013 Ghouta attacks which took place on 21 August, pushing the Khan al-Assal investigation "onto the backburner" according to a UN spokesman.

On 12 December 2013, the UN/OPCW mission published the findings of their investigation. The UN Mission was unable to conduct an on-site visit to Khan al-Assal and relied on testimony from survivors, medical staff. The UN Mission stated that it had received the report of the Russian investigation which identified sarin in environmental sample, and confirmed that the Russian laboratory performed successfully in the OPCW's inter-laboratory quality control program. The UN Mission however stated that it "could not independently verify the information contained therein, and could not confirm the chain of custody for the sampling and the transport of the samples". The UN Mission did not use the results of the Russian investigation in its conclusions. The UN Mission noted that the UN Human Rights Council's Independent International Commission of Inquiry on the Syrian Arab Republic had collected conflicting witness testimony concerning the delivery mechanism for the sarin attack. Some testimony supported the position that a rocket was fired into the neighborhood, while other witnesses claimed an overflying aircraft had dropped an aerial bomb filled with sarin. They concluded that the “United Nations Mission collected credible information that corroborates the allegations that chemical weapons were used in Khan Al Asal”. More specifically they assessed on the basis of epidemiological principles that "an organophosphorous intoxication was the cause of the rapidly onsetting mass intoxication taking place on the morning of the 19 March 2013".

In an interview published two months after the UN/OPCW findings, Åke Sellström, the chief investigator of the UN/OPCW mission was asked about the possibility that the Khan-al-Assal incident was an opposition chemical attack. He noted that it "was difficult to see" how the opposition could have weaponised the toxins used, and that the government had repeatedly denied to him that the rebels had stripped them of any chemical munitions. Sellström raised the possibility that the attack was carried out by a Syrian government fighter jet: "When we come to Khan al Asal, there are two witness statements on how this happened: one is that it is rockets and the other is that it is friendly fire from a Syrian fighter jet. The interesting thing about those two stories is that the Syrian fighter pilot is missing. It is logical, if you do friendly fire as a pilot you would rather go missing than get caught, or this is your last flight and you are going to work for the opposition then you do something." Sellström also noted that the Syrian government had originally requested the UN investigation into the Khan-al-Assal attack and commented: "So there was a background that makes you believe that maybe, just maybe, that the government was right". When asked if he thought the rebels were behind the attack, he replied “I don’t know. I don’t know who was the perpetrator, I have no idea, but the [Syrian] government wanted it investigated. The government was irritated that we didn’t have the mandate to point to the perpetrator at Khan al Asal, that we couldn’t speculate who was the perpetrator.”

== UN Human Rights Council investigation ==
In June 2013, prior to UN investigators arriving in Syria, the UN's Independent International Commission of Inquiry on the Syrian Arab Republic said that there was reason to believe that "limited quantities of toxic chemicals" had been used in the Khan al-Assal attack, but that it was not then in a position "to determine the precise chemical agents used, their delivery systems or the perpetrator".

On 5 March 2014, the UN Human Rights Council published a report of the "Independent International Commission of Inquiry on the Syrian Arab Republic" (dated 12 February) that stated that the chemical agents used in the attack bore "the same unique hallmarks as those used in Al-Ghouta" in August 2013. This conclusion was presumably reached by comparing the chemical analyses of samples from Khan-al-Assal reported by the Russian government with the analyses of samples from Ghouta reported by OPCW, but no details were given. The UN report also indicated, based on "evidence available concerning the nature, quality and quantity of the agents used" that the perpetrators of the Al-Ghouta attack "likely had access to the chemical weapons stockpile of the Syrian military". In none of the incidents, however, was the commission's "evidentiary threshold" met in regard to identifying the perpetrators of the chemical attacks.

== Timeline ==
The following is a timeline of the attack, the background and the aftermath. (Note: All times given are in Eastern European Time (EET), or UTC+02:00.)

=== Sunday, 3 March 2013 ===
Opposition forces capture large parts of the Khan al-Asal Police Academy.

=== Tuesday, 19 March 2013 ===
07:00: A rocket or bomb landed in the southern part of Khan al-Asal. The device released sarin gas on its impact. The gas drifted southwest with the wind.

=== Wednesday, 20 March 2013 ===
The Syrian government officially requested a specialized, impartial and independent UN mission to investigate the attack.

=== Thursday, 21 March 2013 ===
Morning (New York): As a response to the Syrian request, Ban Ki-moon decided to conduct a United Nations fact-finding mission to investigate the attack. The mission was later named the "United Nations Mission to Investigate Alleged Uses of Chemical Weapons in the Syrian Arab Republic".

=== Friday, 22 March 2013 ===
Morning (New York): The UNHRC decided to extend the mandate of their commission of Inquiry from "investigate all massacres" to "investigate all alleged violations of international human rights law since March 2011 in the Syrian Arab Republic".

=== Saturday, 23 March 2013 ===
A Russian investigation team arrived in Khan al-Asal. They took metal fragments and soil samples at the site of the incident.

Afternoon: A Reuters photographer, was shown the site of the incident by Syrian army personnel. He took photographs in the village and of the impact point.

=== Wednesday, 27 March 2013 ===
Ban Ki-moon appointed Åke Sellström to head the UN mission to investigate chemical weapons use in Syria.

=== Sunday, 5 May 2013 ===
Carla Del Ponte, a member of the UNHRC commission of Inquiry told RSI, a Swiss public broadcasting organisation: “Our investigations will have to be further explored, tested and proven through new evidence, but as far as we could determine, at the moment only opponents of the regime have used sarin gas” (roughly translated). The next day, in an apparent reaction to Del Ponte’ comments, the Commission issued a press release clarifying that it “has not reached conclusive findings as to the use of chemical weapons in Syria by any parties in the conflict”.

=== Monday, 8 July 2013 ===
Syria invited Åke Sellström and U.N. disarmament chief Angela Kane to visit Damascus for foreign-minister level talks on conducting a probe of the Khan al-Assal attack.

=== Tuesday, 9 July 2013 ===
The Russian UN ambassador Vitaly Churkin delivered a report with analysis of the samples taken at the site of the chemical attack, to the UN Secretary General Ban Ki-moon.

=== Sunday, 18 August 2013 ===
Two UN investigation teams from the UN Mission to Investigate Alleged Uses of Chemical Weapons in Syria arrived in Damascus to conduct on-site investigation in Khan al-Asal, Sheikh Maqsood and Saraqib.

=== Tuesday, 20 August 2013 ===
The Syrian Government handed over its own investigation report of the Khan al-Asal chemical attack to the UN mission in Damascus.

=== Wednesday, 21 August 2013 ===
The 2013 Ghouta attacks coincidently pushed the UN mission to investigate the Khan al-Assal attack onto “a backburner”.

=== Wednesday, 25 September 2013 ===
The UN mission returned to Syria for five days to conduct fact-finding activities relating to alleged chemical weapons incidents including that in Khan-al-Assal.

== See also ==
- Use of chemical weapons in the Syrian civil war
