= Kfar Daʽel =

Kfar Daʽel كفر داعل
- Village
- Location within Syria
- Coordinates: 36°13′0″N 37°1′15″E
- Country: Syria
- Governorate: Aleppo
- District: Mount Simeon
- Nahiyah: Aleppo

Population (2003)
  - Total: 3,416
- Time zone: UTC+2 (EET)
  - Summer (DST): UTC+3 (EEST)

Kfar Daʽel (Arabic: كفر داعل, also spelled Kafr Daʽil or Kfar Deʽil or Kafr Dael) is a district of Aleppo city in northern Syria, located northwest of the neighbouring Al-Rashidin District of Aleppo, which is a part of the Mount Simeon District in the Aleppo Governorate. It had a population of 3,416 in 2003.

The village is located 12 kilometers (7.5 mi) west of the center of Aleppo, right north of the Afrin - Aleppo Road.

== The Khan al-Asal chemical attack ==
In a letter dated 19 March 2013 the representative of the Syrian Arab Republic at the U.N. informed of its allegation that at 07:30 on 19 March terrorist groups fired a rocket from the Kfar De'il area towards Khan al-Asal. The U.N was not able to collect primary evidence relating to the munition or type of munition and/or delivery system. A February 2014 UN report confirmed the use of sarin that bore the "same unique hallmarks" as the sarin used in the 2013 Ghouta attacks, and that the perpetrators likely had access to the Syrian military's chemical weapons stockpile.
