= Missing women of Afrin =

- Location: Afrin, Syria
- Motive: Rape; Sexual slavery; Intimidation; Humiliation; Forcible conversion to Islam
- Perpetrators: Syrian National Army; Turkish Armed Forces
- Missing: 109
- Convicted: Unconvicted

Since the occupation of Afrin by the Syrian National Army and Turkish Armed Forces in March 2018, numerous reports have emerged regarding the abduction of over 173 women and girls, with 109 still missing. In approximately 30 of these cases, there have been allegations of torture and sexual violence.

Various sources indicate the possibility members of the Syrian National Army and Turkish Armed Forces committed war crimes such as hostage-taking, torture, inhuman or degrading treatment, as well as sexual and gender-based violence. However, no convictions have been made in relation to these allegations. The Independent International Commission of Inquiry on the Syrian Arab Republic's report found evidence suggesting that women and girls were detained by Syrian National Army fighters who subjected them to rape and sexual violence, which resulted in severe physical and psychological harm at both individual and community levels. Some families from Tell Abyad have chosen not to return to their homes due to concerns about the risk of rape and sexual violence.

Additionally, there have been reports that Syrian officers forced male detainees to witness the rape of minors, seemingly as a means to humiliate, extract confessions, and instill fear. According to an eyewitness, Turkish officials were present in the facility on the first day.

== Forced disappearance by the Hamza Division ==
Since 2019, there have been reports of Kurdish women in the Afrin and Ra's al-Ayn regions facing threats of kidnapping, torture, and rape by members of the Syrian National Army brigades; these threats of violence have instilled fear among the women, leading them to confine themselves within their homes.

According to the NGO Syrians for Truth and Justice, the Syrian National Army has held civilians in undisclosed detention sites, and widely circulated video footage showed members of Division 22 (the Hamza Brigade) rushing eight women to another location. The detained women were later identified as Lonjen Abdo, Rojen Abdo, Roshan Amouni, Haifa Al Jasim, Nowruz Abdo, Rokan Munla, Aren Deli, and Nadia Suleiman. Ruken Munla, who was pregnant at the time, was kidnapped in September 2018 and gave birth while in captivity. Lonjen and Rojin Abdo were among several members of their family kidnapped in 2018—it is common for multiple members of the same household to be abducted simultaneously.

According to the Independent International Commission of Inquiry on the Syrian Arab Republic, there have also been also reports of forced marriages and abductions of Kurdish women in Afrin, primarily involving members of Division 24 (the Sultan Murad Brigade) of the Syrian National Army. The Commission received reports that Syrian National Army forces detained women from the Yazidi religious minority and forcibly converted them to Islam. The Syrian National Army has also been accused of transferring Syrian prisoners, including women, to Turkey, with the involvement of Turkish forces, which is considered a gross violation of Article 147 of the Geneva Convention IV.

== See also ==
- List of people who disappeared mysteriously (2000–present)
