= Ansar al-Khilafah =

- أنصار الخلافة
- Logo of Ansar al-Khilafah
- Dates active: December 2012-Unknown
- Split from: Jabhat al-Nusra
- Ideology: Pan-Islamism
- Part of: Hizb ut-Tahrir; 19th Division (2013, in Aleppo); Ansar al-Sharia
- Wars: the Syrian Civil War

Ansar al-Khilafah was an armed rebel group participating in the Syrian Civil War against the Syrian government and its allies. The group was founded in the Aleppo Governorate by five local Al-Nusra units and upon its foundation declared allegiance to Hizb ut-Tahrir.

== Background ==
Upon the establishment of Ansar al-Khilafah in late 2012 the group pledged allegiance to Hizb ut-Tahrir, an international, pan-Islamic political organization, with the stated aim of the re-establishment of the Caliphate, during a video statement. During the video an unnamed commander stated the aims of the group as "That we will work with the sincere people of our Ummah to establish the Islamic Khilafah state, and to use it to end decades of colonization and enslavement," the commander added regarding groups cooperating with western nations, "And indeed we invite our brothers who are fighters in the sincere brigades that they walk our path, and to declare their release from being tied to these new agents [of the West], and we warn them against offering compromises in their religion, for the sake of receiving money or weapons. Because certainly, therein lies their destruction."

== History ==
After the establishment of the group in December 2012, the following month in January 2013 a branch of the group was declared in the Homs Governorate, in the Homs' branch declaration video the branch's commander stated, "We have an absolute belief in the obligation of implementing the sharia [Islamic law] in all aspects of life, and the institutions of the State and resumption of the Islamic way of life."

In the summer of 2013 the group along with the Al-Nusra Front took control of the town of Khan al-Asal in the western Aleppo countryside from pro-government forces and executed several pro-government fighters in the town.

In 2015 the group's branch in Aleppo joined the Ansar al-Sharia alliance alongside Ahrar al-Sham, Al-Nusra and Jabhat Ansar al-Din.
