= Tafas massacre =

Massacre by the Ottoman Army in Tafas

Tafas Massacre
- Part of Late Ottoman genocides
- Location: Tafas, Ottoman Syria
- Date: 27 September 1918
- Target: Arab citizens of Tafas
- Attack type: mass murder
- Perpetrator: Ottoman Army

The Tafas Massacre was the slaughter of civilians in the Ottoman Syrian town of Tafas in an attempt to demoralize the enemy following the retreat of the Ottoman Army.

== Background ==
Nearing the end of World War I in the autumn of 1918, a retreating Ottoman Army column of roughly two thousand under the high command of Djemal Pasha entered Tafas. Its commander, Sharif Bey, ordered all the people massacred, to demoralize the British and Arab forces in pursuit of the Ottoman Army. The British commander leading the Arab forces, T. E. Lawrence, arrived in the area shortly after the massacre and witnessed bodies mutilated and the majority of the town in ruins.

In retaliation for the massacre, Lawrence's troops attacked the withdrawing Turkish columns, and for the first time in the war Lawrence ordered his men to take no prisoners. Around 250 German and Austrian soldiers who had been traveling with the Ottoman troops were captured. When the Arabs discovered one of their men pinned to the ground by two German bayonets, the prisoners were summarily executed by machine guns.

Lawrence wrote in his diary, the basis of his later account in Seven Pillars of Wisdom:

We left Abd el Main there and rode on past the other bodies, now seen clearly in the sunlight to be men, women, and four babies, toward the village whose loneliness we knew meant that it was full of death and horror. On the outskirts were the low mud walls of some sheep-folds, and on one lay something red and white. I looked nearer, and saw the body of a woman folded across it, face downward, nailed there by a saw-bayonet whose half stuck hideously into the air from between her naked legs. She had been pregnant, and about her were others, perhaps twenty in all, variously killed, but laid out to accord with an obscene taste. The Zaggi burst out into wild peals of laughter, in which some of those who were not sick joined hysterically. It was a sight near madness, the more desolate for the warm sunshine and the clean air of this upland afternoon. I said: "The best of you brings me the most Turkish dead"; and we turned and rode as fast as we might in the direction of the fading enemy. On our way we shot down those of them fallen out by the roadside who came imploring our pity.

The incident and ensuing reprisals have become widely known due to their dramatisation as a key episode in David Lean's 1962 film Lawrence of Arabia.

== See also ==
- List of massacres in Ottoman Syria
