= Khan al-Asal Police Academy =

Coordinates: 36°9′18″N 37°0′39″E

- Type: Police academy
- Location: Aleppo, Aleppo Governorate, Syria

The Khan al-Asal Police Academy (Arabic: مدرسة الشرطة), also known as the Aleppo police academy, the Syrian police academy or the Police Academy, is a police educational and training institution in Aleppo, Syria. The academy is located 3 kilometres (1.9 mi) southwest of Khan al-Asal.

== The Police Academy during the Syrian Civil War ==
After eight days of fighting that left 200 troops and rebels dead, the rebels seized most of the police academy on 3 March 2013. The Syrian Army recaptured the police academy in February 2020.
