= 19th Division (Syrian rebel group) =

- الفرقة 19
- Logo of the 19th Division
- Leader: Lt. Col. Muhammad Abdel Qadur Bakur (nom de guerre: "Abu Bakr")
- Dates active: June 2013 – June 2021; September 2012 – September 2022 (Ansar Brigade)
- Groups: Ansar Brigade; Supporters of the Caliphate Brigade; Liwa Amjad al-Islam; Ahrar Khan al-Asal Brigades; Ash-Shuyukh Brigade; Muhajireen Brigade; Liwa Jund al-Haramain
- Active regions: Aleppo Governorate
- Ideology: Sunni Islamism; Jihadism (until 2014)
- Part of: (Syrian opposition) Free Syrian Army; Army of Mujahideen
- Wars: the Syrian Civil War

The 19th Division (Arabic: الفرقة 19) was a Syrian Islamist rebel group which fought in the Syrian Civil War. The group was created in June 2013 in the western countryside of the Aleppo Governorate as a part of a foreign-funded project to unify local Free Syrian Army-affiliated factions into bigger factions.

== History ==
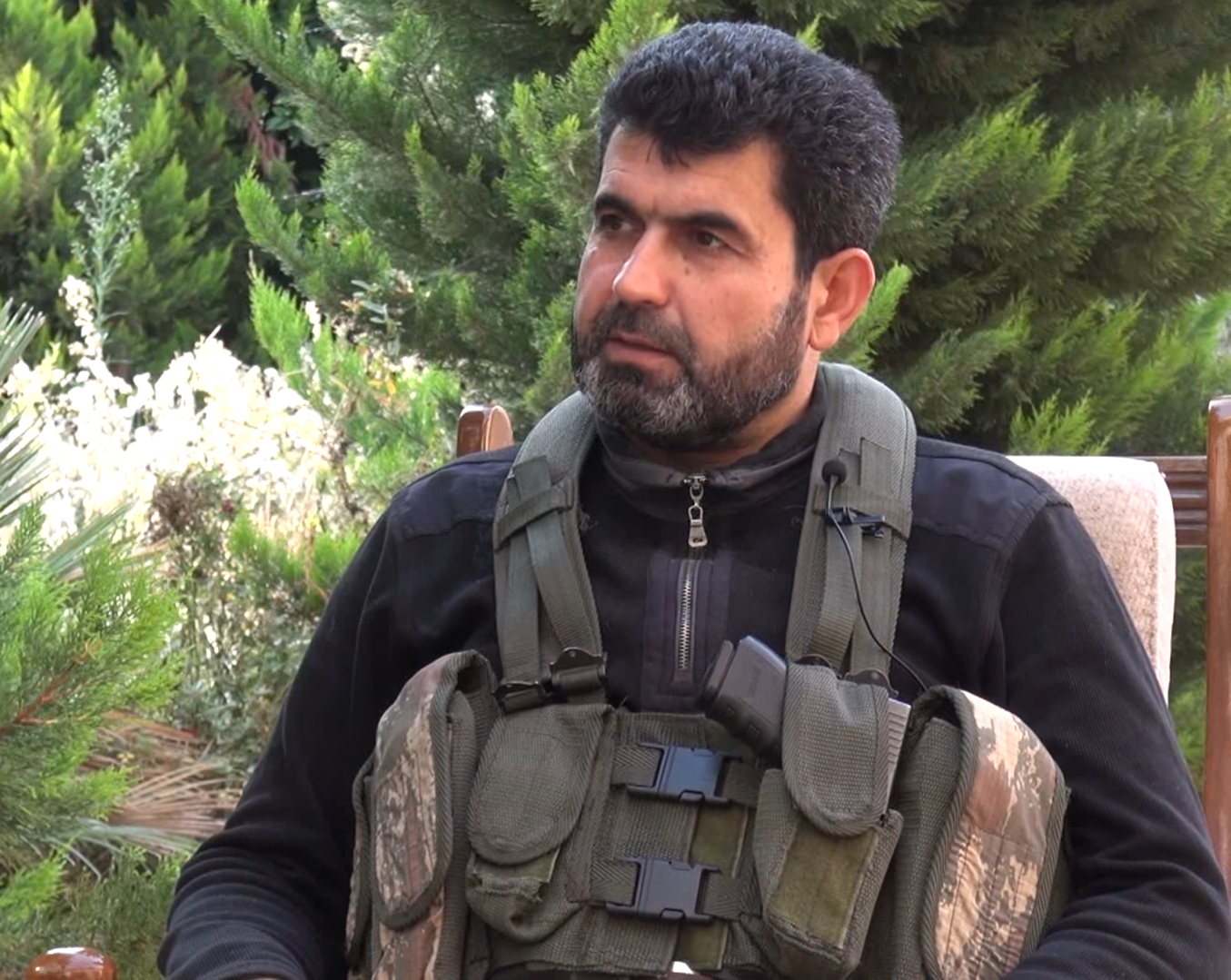
Lieutenant Colonel Muhammad Juma Abdul Qader Bakur (nom de guerre "Abu Bakr"), commander of the 19th Division and the Army of Mujahideen

In September 2012, the Ansar Brigade (Arabic: لواء الانصار, Liwa al-Ansar) was formed as part of the Mutasim Billah Brigades in the western Aleppo countryside. The group was known for producing improvised fighting vehicles. In June 2013, the group joined several other rebel groups in the area and formed the 19th Division.

In late June 2013, a rebel court in Darat Izza arrested a media activist after he criticized Lt. Col. Muhammad Bakur, commander of the Ansar Brigade of the 19th Division. The arrest was condemned by an opposition court in Atarib, which demanded the Darat Izza court to release him.

On 25 September 2013, the 19th Division signed a statement, along with 12 other Syrian rebel groups, in which it rejected any foreign-based opposition group, including the Syrian National Council.

== See also ==
- Khan al-Assal massacre
- List of armed groups in the Syrian Civil War
