= Hatla =

Hatla حطلة
- Village
- Location within Syria
- Coordinates: 35°18′05″N 40°14′12″E
- Country: Syria
- Governorate: Deir ez-Zor
- District: Deir ez-Zor
- Subdistrict: Deir ez-Zor
- Time zone: UTC+2 (EET)
  - Summer (DST): UTC+3 (EEST)

Hatla (Arabic: حطلة, romanized: Hatlah) is a district of city Deir ez-Zor located along the Euphrates River, southeast of Deir ez-Zor.

== Syrian Civil War ==
On 11 June 2013, a massacre was conducted by Syrian opposition fighters in the village. According to a UN report, 30 people were killed.

On 12 April 2017, the Syrian Army claimed chemical weapons stored by ISIL in Hatla were bombed by the American-led intervention in Syria. The American army denied that any air strikes were carried out in that area at that time. The Syrian army claimed that hundreds of deaths from poison gas exposure occurred. There has been no independent confirmation of the attack.

On 27 September 2017, the Syrian Army recaptured the village of Hatla from ISIL.
