= Khan al-Asal =

Khan al-Assal خان العسل
- Neighborhood
- Location within Syria
- Coordinates: 36°10′2″N 37°2′21″E
- Country: Syria
- Governorate: Aleppo
- District: Mount Simeon
- Nahiyah: Aleppo
- Time zone: UTC+2 (EET)
  - Summer (DST): UTC+3 (EEST)

Khan al-Assal (Arabic: خان العسل, romanized: Ḵān al-ʿAsal) is a district of Aleppo city in northern Syria. It is administratively a sub-district of Aleppo, which is a part of the Mount Simeon District in the Aleppo Governorate. Khan al-Assal is located 12 kilometers (7.5 mi) west-southwest of the center of Aleppo.

The neighborhood is separated in a northern and a southern part by the Aleppo road to Idlib. The Aleppo-Damascus Highway is the village boundary in the south. A police academy is located 3 kilometers (1.9 mi) southwest of Khan al-Assal. Al-Assad Military Academy is located 5 kilometers (3.1 mi) east by north of Khan al-Assal. The village Kfar Da’el is located 5 kilometers (3.1 mi) north by east of Khan al-Assal.

An Army Fueling Base with underground fuel storages, fueling station and several bunkers is located close to the western boundary of the northern part of the village.

== Khan al-Assal during the Syrian Civil War ==
During the Syrian Civil War, in the battle of Aleppo southwestern front, the village and the surrounding area have faced several incidents. Some of them violate International humanitarian law.

=== 2013 ===
March:

- Early in March 2013 at least 120 government soldiers/policemen and 80 rebels were killed during a battle over the Khan al-Asal Police Academy.
- The village was the location of a chemical weapon attack on 19 March 2013, which resulted in at least 26 fatalities and more than 86 injuries. At the time of the incident, there was ongoing shelling between the Syrian army and the opposition forces, located in areas surrounding the village.

July:

- The village was taken by rebel forces on 22 July 2013. In the aftermath of the fall of the village, the rebel forces, and specifically the Al-Nusra Front, were accused of executing 51 captured government soldiers. Video material collected online by the United Nations, indicates that they were executed by gunfire after their capture by members of the Ansar al-Khilafa Brigade.

=== 2020 ===
February:

- The Syrian Arab Armed Forces recaptured the village on 11 February 2020.
