= Suter (disambiguation) =

Suter may refer to:

- Suter, surname
- Suter, West Virginia
- Suter (computer program), U.S. military computer program developed by BAE Systems that attacks computer networks and communications systems belonging to an enemy
- Mount Suter, a mountain in New Zealand
