= Middle East nuclear weapon free zone =

Nuclear-weapon-free zones Nuclear weapons states Nuclear sharing Neither, but NPT

The Middle East nuclear weapon free zone (MENWFZ) is a proposed agreement similar to other nuclear-weapon-free zones. Steps towards the establishment of such a zone began in the 1960s, with Egypt and Iran calling for it via a 1974 joint declaration and United Nations General Assembly resolution. Following the 1995 NPT Review Conference, the International Atomic Energy Agency (IAEA) held a series of meetings involving experts and academics to consider ways to advance this process.

Such a zone would strengthen the Nuclear Non-Proliferation Treaty (NPT), would help to promote global nuclear disarmament, and would also help the Middle East peace process as substantial confidence-building measures. As of 2025, Israel is the only Middle Eastern country widely believed to possess nuclear weapons, and only non-party to the Treaty on the Non-Proliferation of Nuclear Weapons. Under its Begin Doctrine, it has carried out airstrikes on nuclear facilities in Iraq, Syria, and Iran. Additionally, United States nuclear weapons are stored in Turkey under NATO nuclear sharing. As of 2014, three countries in the Middle East have been found in non-compliance with their IAEA safeguards obligations under the NPT: Iraq, Iran and Syria. Of these cases, Syria remains unresolved.

In 1990, Egyptian president Hosni Mubarak expanded the UN proposal, to prohibit all weapons of mass destruction. International inspection of Iraqi weapons of mass destruction capabilities played a central role in the Gulf War and Iraq War. Modern challenges for the expanded proposal include Israeli chemical and biological capabilities, and the remnants of the Ba'athist Syria's chemical weapons program.

== History ==
Steps towards the establishment of such a zone began in the 1960s led to a joint declaration by Egypt and Iran in 1974 which resulted in a General Assembly resolution (broadened in 1990 through the Mubarak Initiative to cover all weapons of mass destruction).

The United Nations Security Council Resolution 687 (the ceasefire ending the Gulf War) recognizes the goal of establishing the MENWFZ (para 14).

The 1995 Nuclear Non-Proliferation Treaty Review and Extension Conference, in connection with the decision to extend the NPT indefinitely, adopted a resolution on the Middle East calling for a Middle East zone free of all weapons of mass destruction and their delivery systems. The International Atomic Energy Agency (IAEA) held a series of meetings involving experts and academics to consider ways to advance this process.

In 2004, the Gulf Research Center proposed the establishment of a WMD-free zone covering the six members of the Gulf Cooperation Council (Bahrain, Kuwait, Oman, Qatar, Saudi Arabia and the United Arab Emirates), Iran, Iraq and Yemen. This subregional WMD-free zone was supposed to be a first step toward a broader one to cover the whole Middle East.

Following pressure from Egypt and the Arab League, the 2010 NPT Review Conference called for holding a conference on a MENWFZ which would primarily press Israel to end its policy of ambiguity. Finland planned to host such an event in 2012. However, no agreement was reached on the agenda and other issues, and the conference was called off in November 2012.

An international group of concerned citizens, including former members of the Israeli Knesset, responded to the lack of progress in official talks by organizing an International Conference For A WMD-Free Middle East. It was held in Haifa in December 2013.

In September 2013, there was an initiative for a weapons of mass destruction free zone (WMDFZ) in the Middle East. As at January 2014, the Secretary-General of UNODA has received letters confirming support for declaring the Middle East a region free from weapons of mass destruction, including nuclear, chemical and biological weapons. Such letters have been received from all members of the Arab League (except for Syria): Algeria, Bahrain, Comoros, Djibouti, Egypt, Iran, Iraq, Jordan, Kuwait, Lebanon, Libya, Mauritania, Morocco, Oman, Qatar, Saudi Arabia, Somalia, Sudan, Tunisia, United Arab Emirates and Yemen, and from permanent observer Palestine. Syria has not sent such a letter.)

As of 2014, three countries in the Middle East have been found in non-compliance with their IAEA safeguards obligations under the NPT: Iraq, Iran and Syria. Of these cases, Iran and Syria remain unresolved.

In 2017, civil society activists and disarmament experts established the Middle East Treaty Organization (METO) to create opportunities for track 1.5 and track 2 diplomatic efforts, and generally advocate for a WMDFZ in the Middle East (MEWMDFZ). As an international non-governmental organization (NGO), METO's mission is in the spirit of the 2013 initiatives calling to expand the proposed MENWFZ to all weapons of mass destruction. Since their founding, METO has organized a series of roundtable conferences and negotiations among Middle Eastern diplomats, security experts, and former diplomats to negotiate on a draft treaty text for establishing such a zone.

The draft treaty text facilitated by METO's process was brought to the United Nations General Assembly by Egypt on 22 December 2018, alongside a proposal to launch an annual conference to discuss the zone. The UN General Assembly resolved to convene an annual meeting on the establishment of a Middle East WMDFZ. The first annual conference was held from 18 November to 22 November 2019 at UN Headquarters in New York, presided over by the UN Permanent Representative from Jordan. Almost all states of the region attended the conference, including the 22 members of the Arab League and Iran, as well as four nuclear-armed states China, France, Russia, and the United Kingdom, alongside other observer states and international organizations. The only regional country that did not participate was Israel.

They agreed to meet again from 16 to 20 November 2020. That meeting was postponed until 29 November 2021 - 03 December 2021 because of COVID.

The third conference was held 14–18 November 2022, with the fourth scheduled for 13 to 17 November 2023.

== Positions ==
=== Egypt ===
Egypt sees a MENWFZ as a means of pressure on Israel to relinquish its ambiguous nuclear policy, and to sign the NPT. Until the Iranian nuclear program, Israel was believed to be the only regional country to have a nuclear deterrence capability, developed in the 1960s.

=== Iran ===
Iran has denied that it is pursuing a nuclear-weapons capability and insists that its nuclear program solely aims at meeting its growing civilian energy needs. Tehran has taken a low-profile approach toward the MEC, neither endorsing nor rejecting it.

In 1974, as concerns in the region grew over Israel's nuclear weapon program, Iran formally proposed the concept of a nuclear weapon free zone in the Middle East in a joint resolution in the UN General Assembly. The Shah of Iran had made a similar appeal five years earlier but had failed to attract any support.

The call for the creation of nuclear weapons free zone in the Middle East was repeated by Iran's President Ahmadinejad in 2006, by Foreign Minister Mottaki in 2008, and by Foreign Minister Zarif in 2015.

In early November 2012, Ali Asghar Soltanieh, Iran's ambassador to the IAEA, announced that his country planned to attend the WMD-free MidEast conference. The conference was however later cancelled.

=== Israel ===
Avner Cohen, Gerald Steinberg and other experts have noted that Israeli policy has emphasized the link between nuclear demilitarization and a comprehensive peace settlement including Palestinian issues and with countries and potential threats in the region, including Syria and Iran. Israel maintains a veil of “studied ambiguity” (“amimut”) about its nuclear arsenal, and has not signed the Nuclear Non-Proliferation Treaty.
