= 253 Squadron (Israel) =

Israeli military unit

- טייסת הנגב
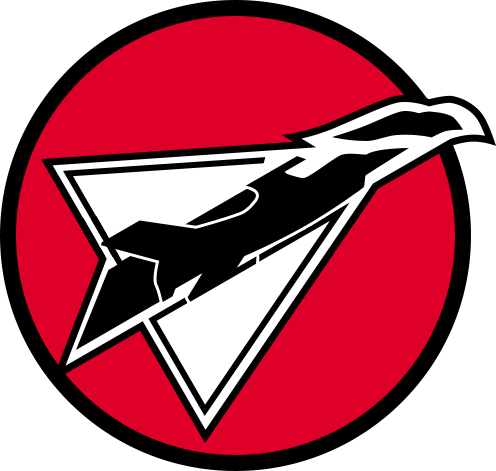
- Country: Israel
- Branch: Israeli Air Force
- Size: Squadron
- Garrison/HQ: Ramon Airbase
- Nickname: Negev Squadron
- Engagements: Israeli–Lebanese conflict; Operation Litani; Operation Accountability; Operation Iron Eagle; Second Lebanon War

Aircraft flown
- Fighter: Lockheed Martin F-16I Sufa

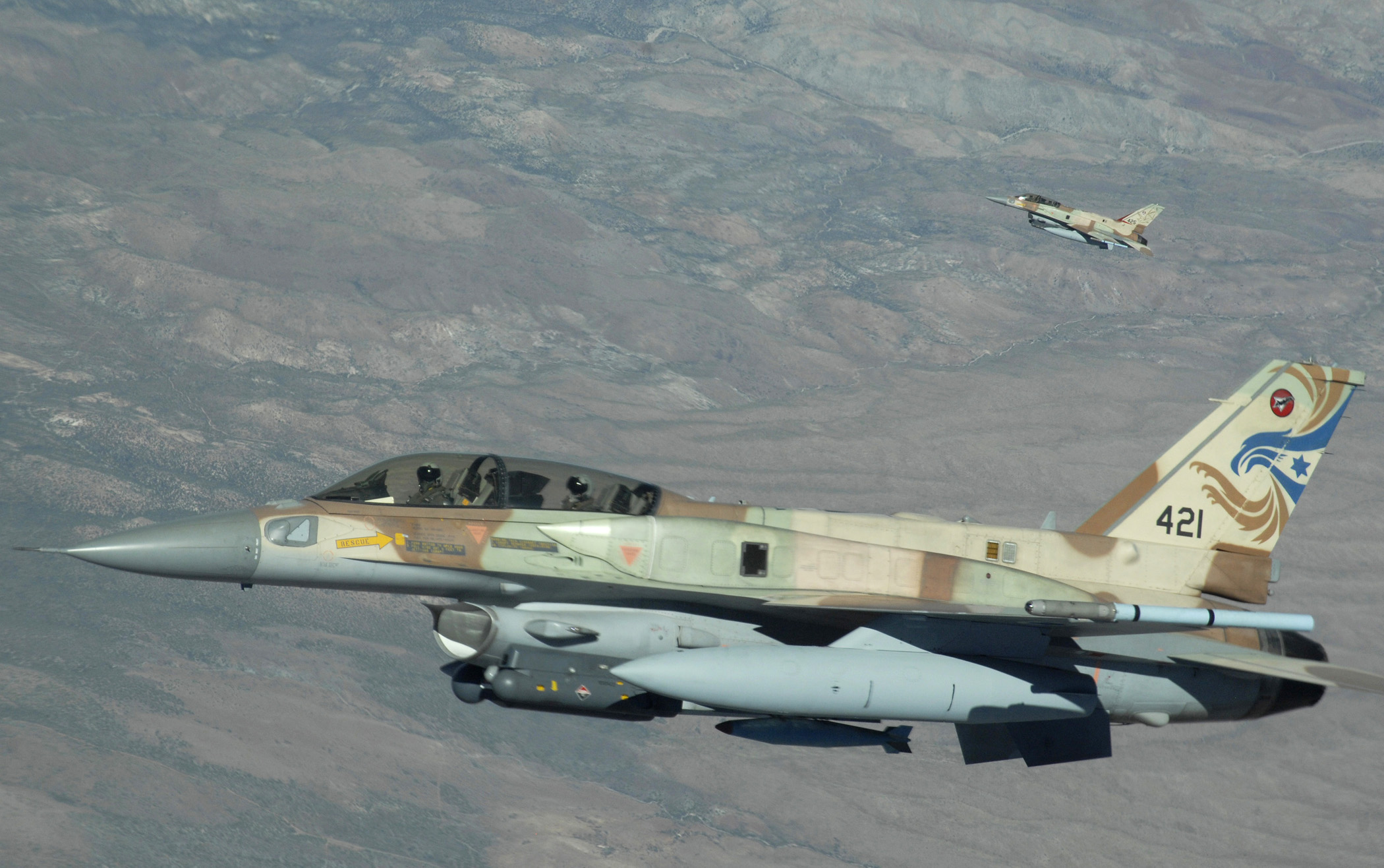
A Negev Squadron F-16I at Red Flag in 2009

253 Squadron of the Israeli Air Force, also known as the Negev Squadron, is an F-16I fighter squadron based at Ramon Airbase.

== History ==
On 27 July 1976 the squadron was founded at Hatzor Airbase and were assigned IAI Neshers.

On 4 June 1978, the 253 Squadron was told to retrain on the Dassault Mirage III aircraft. Following the signage of the Egypt–Israel peace treaty, Israeli forces withdrew and had to abandon established bases in the area. The squadron's Mirages were relocated to a reserve squadron, with the 253 Squadron awaiting conversion to the F-16B Netz, later becoming the IDF's third F-16B squadron.

In October 1981, he squadron deployed to Ramat David Airbase, before being transferred to Ramon Airbase in early 1982.

The squadron's aircraft were equipped with guided bombs beginning in 1994. The bombs saw operational use on 3 August 1995 during Operation Iron Eagle, with two of these guided bombs striking an observation tower manned by insurgents.

The squadron also participated in the Second Lebanon War.

In March 2018, Israel's government confirmed that 253 Squadron, along with 69 and 119 Squadrons, took part and successfully completed Operation Orchard on 6 September 2007, destroying the nuclear installations of Syria constructed with the help of North Korea.
