= Chon Chibu =

North Korean nuclear physicist

Chon Chibu (전치부) is a North Korean nuclear physicist who worked at the Yongbyon Nuclear Scientific Research Center. Chibu was photographed with Ibrahim Othman, the director general of the Syrian Atomic Energy Commission, in Syria in 2007. Documents found on Othman's laptop, including a photo of him with Chon, led to the strike at the al-Khibar nuclear reactor by the Israeli military (codenamed Operation Orchard) on 6 September 2007.
