= Syria and weapons of mass destruction =

Ba'athist Syria researched, manufactured, stockpiled, and used chemical weapons, and pursued the production of nuclear weapons.

The covert Syrian chemical weapons program began in the 1970s with assistance from Egypt and the Soviet Union. The Syrian civil war saw extensive use of chemical weapons in hundreds of attacks, predominantly by the Syrian Arab Armed Forces using sarin and chlorine. ISIL also used mustard gas, and Seymour Hersh controversially reported that the Syrian opposition forces used sarin. The August 2013 Ghouta sarin attack was the deadliest of the war, triggering international pressure, and in September, the United States, Russia, and Syria announced an agreement for the elimination of Syria's chemical weapon stockpiles, excluding chlorine. The OPCW-UN Joint Mission completed destruction of Syria's declared chemical weapons production facilities at the end of October 2013, and shipped overseas its declared stockpile by June 2014. The mission was undermined as Syria disclosed a ricin program and further production sites throughout 2014 and 2015. According to a OPCW-UN investigation, the Syrian military perpetrated the 2017 Khan Shaykhun sarin attack, which prompted a retaliatory US missile strike. The 2018 Douma chlorine attack triggered a joint missile strike by the US, UK, and France. Following the 2024 fall of the Assad regime, foreign minister Asaad al-Shaibani stated in March 2025 that the Syrian caretaker government would cooperate with an incoming OPCW mission to destroy any remaining chemical weapons.

Syria sought to develop nuclear weapons with assistance from North Korea, and alleged funding and coordination with Iran. It began construction of a weapons-grade plutonium production reactor at Al Kibar. Mossad and the United States Intelligence Community became aware of the site in 2004, and the Israeli Air Force carried out an airstrike that destroyed the facility in 2007. The Syria file at the International Atomic Energy Agency (IAEA) remains open, amid Syria's failure to respond to the IAEA's questions about the destroyed facility, including the whereabouts of the reactor's nuclear fuel. In January 2015, it was reported that the Syrian government was suspected to be building a nuclear plant in Al-Qusayr. In 2025, the new government allowed the IAEA to inspect several sites related to its nuclear program. In August 2026, the Trump administration brokered a deal between Syria and Israel by allowing the IAEA to remove nuclear material stored at "Site 99" storage facility linked to the Al Kibar reactor.

== Background ==
Following the Israeli occupation of the Golan Heights during the 1967 Six-Day War, and South Lebanon in 1978, the Syrian government has regarded Israeli military power as a threat to Syrian security. Syria first acquired chemical weapons from Egypt in 1973 as a military deterrent against Israel before launching the Yom Kippur War. Despite the fact that Syrian officials did not explicitly declare the chemical weapons capability, they implied it through speeches and in addition warned of retaliations. Internal Syrian chemical weapons capability may have been developed with indirect Russian, German, Chinese technical and logistical support. It is likely Syria imported dual-use chemical weapon precursors and production equipment from West Europe, China and North Korea.

In 1997, security analyst Zuhair Diab, who worked for the Syrian Ministry of Foreign Affairs as a diplomat from 1981 to 1985, wrote that Israeli nuclear weapons were a primary motivation for the Syrian chemical weapons program. Their rivalry with Iraq and Turkey were also important considerations.

On 23 July 2012 Syria implicitly confirmed it possessed a stockpile of chemical weapons which it says are reserved for national defense against foreign countries.

During the Syrian Civil War, in August 2012, the Syrian military restarted chemical weapons testing at a base on the outskirts of Aleppo. Chemical weapons were a major point of discussion between the Syrian government and world leaders, with military intervention being considered by the West as a potential consequence of the use of such weapons.

== Chemical weapons ==
=== Syria's chemical weapons program ===
Syria's chemical weapons program began in the 1970s with weapons and training from Egypt and the Soviet Union, with production of chemical weapons in Syria beginning in the mid-1980s. In the July 2007 Syrian arms depot explosion, there were suggestions that the incident involved a secret chemical weapons facility.

Prior to September 2013 Syria was one of a handful of states which had not ratified the Chemical Weapons Convention, and had not publicly admitted to possessing chemical weapons, although Western intelligence services believed it to hold a massive stockpile. In September 2013, French intelligence put the Syrian stockpile at 1,000 tonnes, including mustard gas, VX and "several hundred tonnes of sarin". After international condemnation of the August 2013 Ghouta chemical attack, for which Western states held the Syrian government responsible (whilst Syria and Russia held the Syrian rebels of the Syrian civil war responsible), in September 2013 Syria joined the Convention (formally acceding on 14 October), as part of its agreement to the destruction of its chemical weapons under the supervision of the Organisation for the Prohibition of Chemical Weapons. In October 2013, the OPCW found a total of 1,300 tons of chemical weapons.

On 16 October 2013, the OPCW and the United Nations formally established a joint mission to oversee the elimination of the Syrian chemical weapons program by mid-2014, which was declared completed in January 2016. According to Reuters, a chemical analysis done in January 2018 on the destroyed stockpile samples match some chemical markers such as hexamine, unique to the Syrian recipe for sarin, with samples from the 21 August 2013 Ghouta attack and also from interviewees' samples from Khan Sheikhoun and Khan Al-Assal attack sites.

=== Syrian opposition chemical weapons capability ===
The Syrian government claims that the opposition has the capacity to launch large chemical attacks such as those seen at Ghouta. Sources such as the United States and Human Rights Watch disagree, claiming there is no significant evidence the opposition has any significant chemical weapons capability.

A Syrian military source told SANA, the official news agency in Syria, that the Syrian Army seized two containers with sarin together with automatic rifles, pistols and homemade bombs (IEDs) in a rebel hideout in the al-Faraieh neighborhood (also spelled Al-Faraya) of the city of Hama on 1 June 2013, which has been the scene of fighting between government troops and armed opposition groups. The Syrian government declared the two cylinders "as abandoned chemical weapons" and told the OPCW that "the items did not belong to" them. On 14 June 2014, the Joint OPCW-UN Mission confirmed that the cylinders contained sarin. On 7 July 2014, UN Secretary-General Ban Ki-Moon informed the UN Security Council about the findings.

In December 2013 investigative journalist Seymour Hersh controversially reported that multiple U.S. intelligence agencies had allegedly produced top secret assessments in the summer of 2013, regarding Syrian rebel's supposed chemical weapons capabilities. The alleged assessments were said by Hersh to have concluded that the Al-Nusra Front and Al-Qaeda in Iraq were capable of acquiring, producing, and deploying sarin gas "in quantity". A spokesman for the Director of National Intelligence replied that Hersh's report was "simply false."

On 8 April 2016, a spokesman for the rebel group said that "weapons not authorized for use in these types of confrontations" had been used against Kurdish militia and civilians in the Sheikh Maqsood neighborhood in Aleppo. He stated that "One of our commanders has unlawfully used a type of weapon that is not included in our list". He did not specify what substances were used but, according to the Kurdish Red Crescent, the symptoms were consistent with the use of chlorine gas or other agents. Welat Memo, a physician with the Kurdish Red Crescent, said that the people affected are "vomiting and having difficulty in breathing." Jaysh al-Islam subsequently clarified that it was referring to "modified Grad rockets," not chemical weapons.

=== ISIS mustard gas use ===
The BBC reported in September 2015 that, according to an unnamed U.S. official, the U.S. believes that ISIS had used powdered mustard agent at least four times in Syria and Iraq, that ISIS had probably manufactured the mustard agent itself, and probably had an active chemical weapons research team. Mustard agent is a relatively simple chemical weapon to manufacture, and given the Syrian government's chemical-weapons disarmament, analysts deemed it unlikely that ISIS had acquired the mustard agent from seizing a Syrian government cache. The BBC further stated that a BBC team on the Turkey-Syria border had seen corroborating evidence.

== Biological weapons ==
Ba'athist Syria was generally considered not to have biological weapons. However, there are some reports of an active biological weapons research and production program. According to NATO Consultant Dr Jill Dekker, Syria has worked on: anthrax, plague, tularemia, botulism, smallpox, aflatoxin, cholera, ricin and camelpox, and has used Russian help in installing anthrax in missile warheads. She also stated "they view their bio-chemical arsenal as part of a normal weapons program".

== Nuclear program ==
Syria
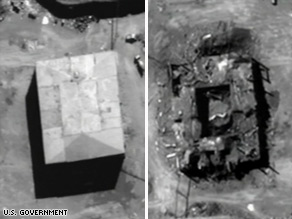
- Before and after satellite image of destroyed undeclared reactor, 2007.

- Nuclear program start date: 1979; 47 years ago (alleged)
- Nuclear program end date: 2009; 17 years ago
- First nuclear weapon test: None
- First thermonuclear weapon test: None
- Largest yield test: None
- Total tests: None
- Peak stockpile: None
- Current stockpile: None (Program destroyed in its earliest stages)
- Maximum missile range: Scud-ER; 1,000 kilometres (620 mi)
- Nuclear triad: No
- NPT party: Yes

Syria ratified the Nuclear Non-Proliferation Treaty (NPT), and conducted a limited scope basic research on nuclear power on an IAEA-approved non-nuclear reactor, called SRR-1, purchased from China in 1991. Despite its international obligations and claiming to be adhere to the nuclear weapon free zone in Middle East, Syria has yet to hand a letter confirming its support nuclear weapon free zone to the United Nations (UN) and had been accused of covertly pursuing its ambitions to either develop or acquire nuclear weapons since 1979, according to the GlobalSecurity.org and Wisconsin Project on Nuclear Arms Control think tanks reports.

Construction of an undeclared nuclear facility and reactor took place under direct supervision of North Korea in Deir ez-Zor Governorate in 2004, with the reactor's striking similarity in shape and size to the North Korean Yongbyon Nuclear Scientific Research Center. With the assistance from North Korea and research coordination with Iran, the efforts were directed towards producing the weapons-grade plutonium.

Fear of nuclear proliferation and volatile security situation in Middle East, the Israeli intelligence discussed the idea of joint operation to the Bush administration in the United States, although the latter declined to participate on a view of United States Intelligence Community claiming to have low confidence that the site was meant for weapons development.

On 6 September 2007, Israel targeted and destroyed the undeclared facility while the nuclear reactor was still under construction and suspected to have killed ten North Korean workers.

In 2011, the IAEA officially confirmed that the site was a nuclear reactor.

=== Open nuclear programs ===
Syria has attempted to purchase small research type nuclear reactors from China, Russia, Argentina, or other countries. Despite these attempted purchases being openly disclosed and IAEA monitored, international pressure led to all these purchases being cancelled. Syria had open and IAEA monitored nuclear research programs including a Chinese made non-reactor miniature neutron source.

Syria concluded a $100 million deal with Argentina in 1990 to purchase a 10 MW nuclear reactor, but the purchase was canceled due to pressure from the United States and Israel. Syria had a similar agreement with India for a 5 MW nuclear reactor, although this agreement was also cancelled under American pressure. There was also an agreement with Russia for a 25 MW nuclear reactor in 1998, though it was cancelled under similar pressure. In addition, a Russian-Syrian agreement to build a 25 MW nuclear reactor was published on the Russian Foreign Ministry website in January 2003, but the Russian Foreign Ministry officially denied there was such a discussion.

On 26 November 2008 IAEA Board of Governors approved technical aid for Syria despite Western allegations that Syria had a secret atomic program that could eventually be used to make weapons. China, Russia and developing nations criticized Western "political interference" that they said undermined IAEA's program to foster civilian atomic energy development. The top U.N. nuclear official also strongly rebuked Western powers for trying to deny the request, saying this should not be done without evidence and merely on the existence of an investigation.

=== Alleged nuclear reactor ===
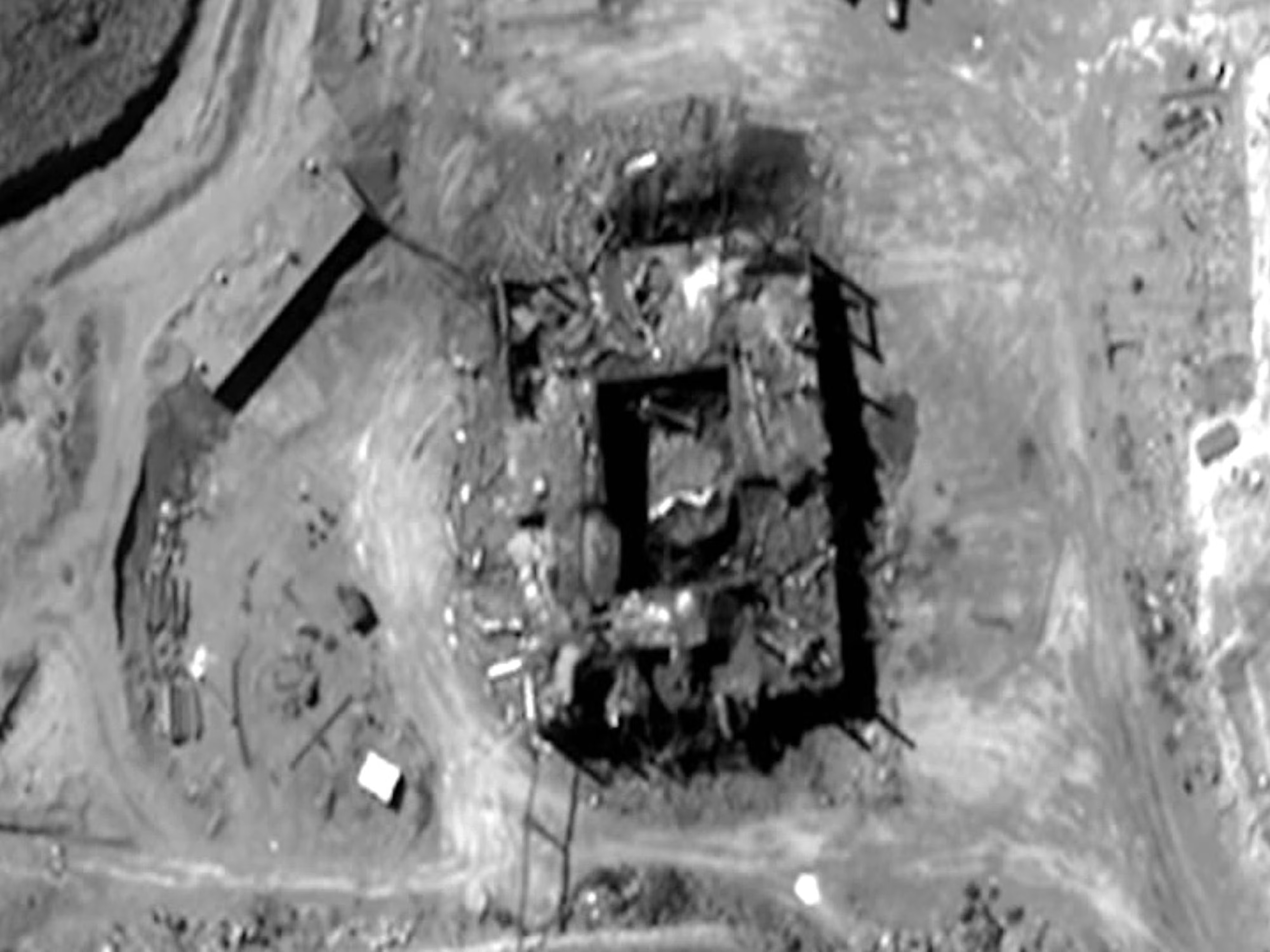
Satellite photo of the destroyed site

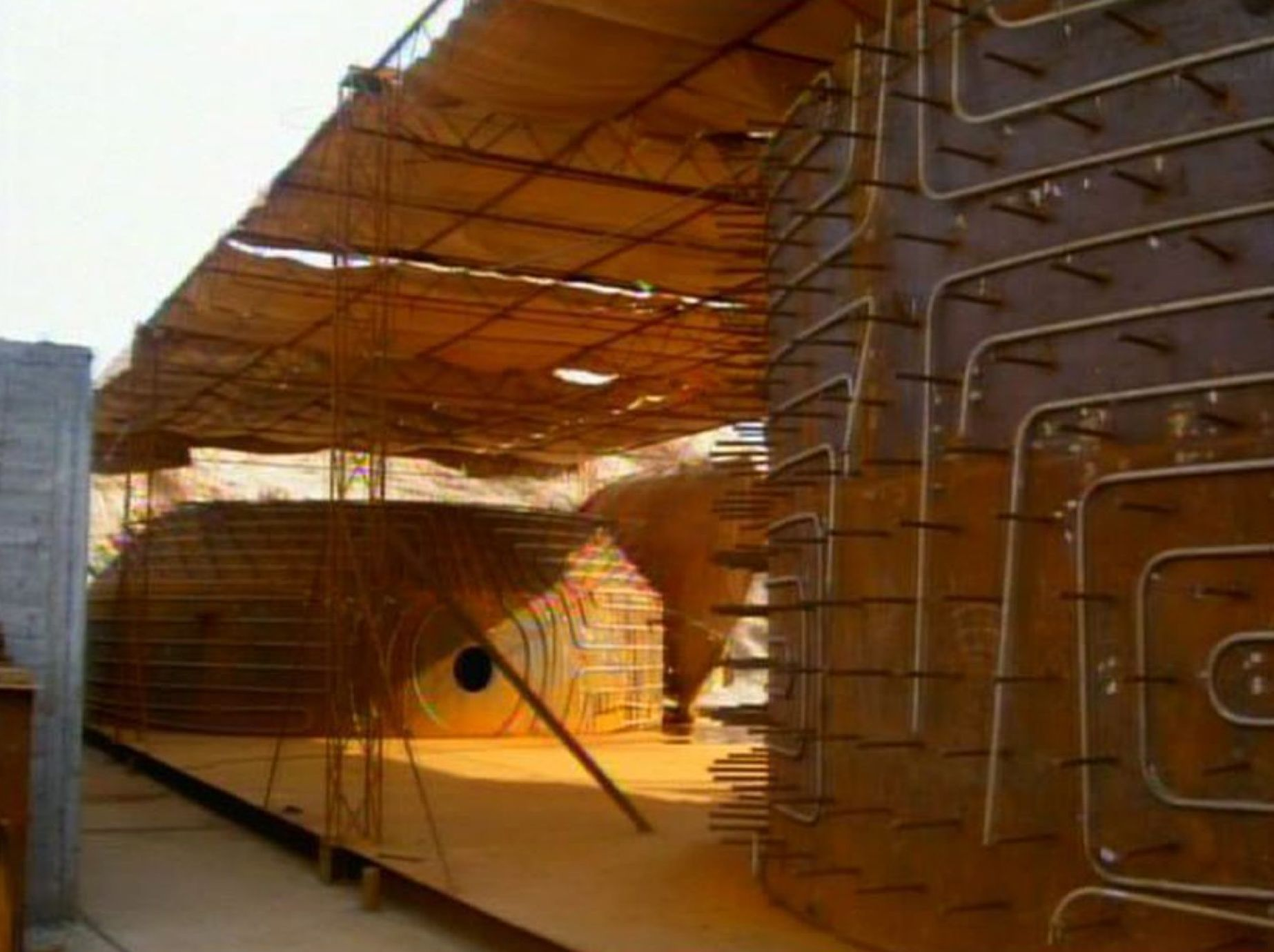
Intelligence photo of the alleged reactor vessel under construction

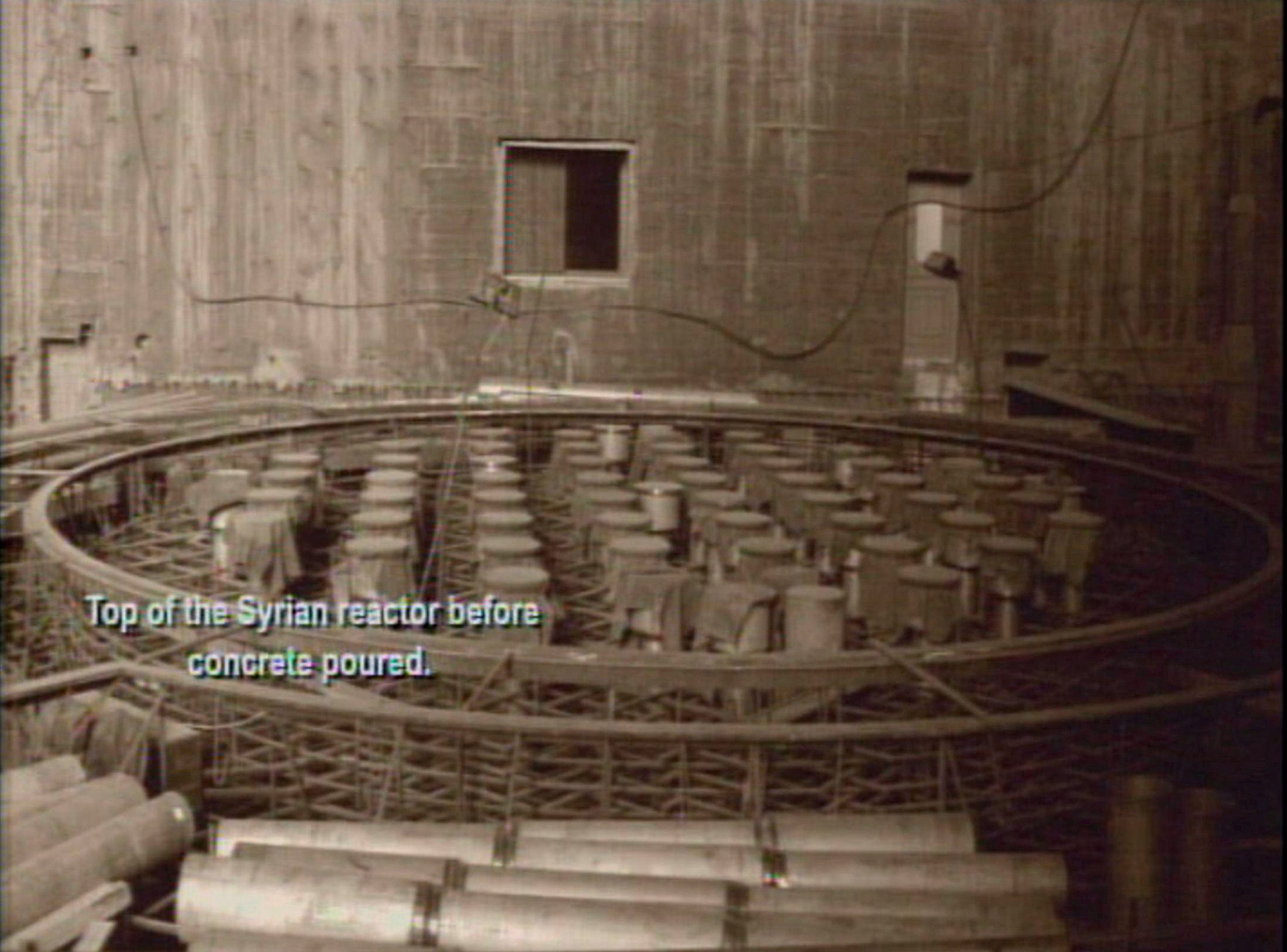
Intelligence photo of the alleged reactor head and fuel channels under construction

==== Bombing of alleged reactor ====
On 6 September 2007, Israel bombed an officially unidentified site in Syria which it believed had been a nuclear reactor under construction, in an operation called Operation Outside the Box. It was further claimed that the nuclear reactor was not yet operational and no nuclear material had been introduced into it. Top U.S. intelligence officials claimed that the site was meant for weapons development.

Western press reports asserted that the Israeli air strike followed a shipment delivery to Syria by a North Korean freighter, and that North Korea was suspected to be supplying a reactor to Syria for a nuclear weapons program. On 24 October 2007 the Institute for Science and International Security released a report which identified a site in eastern Syria's Deir ez-Zor Governorate province as the suspected reactor. The report speculated about similarities between the Syrian building and North Korea's Yongbyon Nuclear Scientific Research Center, but said that it was too early to make a definitive comparison. On 25 October 2007, Western media said the main building and any debris from it following the air strike had been completely dismantled and removed by the Syrians.

==== Reaction to allegations ====
On 23 June 2008, IAEA inspectors were allowed to visit the Dair Alzour site (also referred to as Al Kibar), and take samples of the debris. On 19 November 2008 an IAEA report stated that "a significant number of natural uranium particles" produced as a result of chemical processing were found at the Al Kibar site; however, the IAEA did not find sufficient evidence to prove Syria is developing nuclear weapons. Some American nuclear experts have speculated about similarities between the alleged Syrian reactor and North Korea's Yongybon reactor but IAEA Director General ElBaradei has pointed out that "there was uranium but it doesn't mean there was a reactor". ElBaradei has shown dissatisfaction with the United States and Israel for only providing the IAEA with photos of the bombed facility in Syria, and has also urged caution against prematurely judging Syria's atomic program by reminding diplomats about false U.S. claims that Saddam Hussein had weapons of mass destruction. Russia, China, Iran, and non-aligned countries have also supported giving Syria nuclear guidance despite pressure from the United States.

Joseph Cirincione, an expert on nuclear proliferation and head of the Washington-based Ploughshares Fund, commented "we should learn first from the past and be very cautious about any intelligence from the US about other country's weapons." Syria has denounced "the fabrication and forging of facts" in regards to the incident.

IAEA Director General Mohamed ElBaradei criticized the strikes and deplored that information regarding the matter had not been shared with his agency earlier. Syria has declined to let the IAEA visit other military sites the United States recently made allegations about, arguing it fears that too much openness on its part would encourage the U.S. to push for years of relentless international scrutiny. Syria has said it will voluntarily cooperate with the IAEA further if it isn't "at the expense of disclosing our military sites or causing a threat to our national security." One of its three nuclear sites, located in Iskandariyah, is suspected to be a nuclear reactor.

The Non-Aligned Movement has called for the establishment of a nuclear weapons free zone in the Middle East and called for a comprehensive multilaterally negotiated instrument which prohibits threats of attacks on nuclear facilities devoted to peaceful uses of nuclear energy. The Gulf Cooperation Council has also appealed for a nuclear weapons free Middle East and recognition of the right of a country to expertise in the field of nuclear energy for peaceful purposes. The IAEA has also approved a resolution urging all Middle East nations to renounce atomic bombs.

=== IAEA inspections ===
After refusing to comment on the reports for six months, the Bush administration briefed Congress and the IAEA on 24 April 2008, saying that the U.S. Government was "convinced" that Syria had been building a "covert nuclear reactor" that was "not intended for peaceful purposes." The briefing included releases of satellite photographs of the bombed site and overhead and ground level intelligence photographs of the site under construction, including the alleged reactor vessel steel shell before concrete was poured and of the alleged reactor head structure.

On 27 April 2008, Syrian President Bashar al-Assad had said the Dair Alzour site was just "a military site under construction, not a nuclear site as Israel and America claimed," and that Syria's goal is a nuclear-free Middle East. Syria allowed an IAEA visit to the site on 23 June 2008, which took environmental samples that revealed the presence of man-made uranium and other materials consistent with a reactor. Syria refused IAEA requests for further information on or access to the Dair Alzour site.

A 2009 IAEA investigation reported evidence of uranium and graphite and concluded that the site bore features resembling an undeclared nuclear reactor. IAEA was initially unable to confirm or deny the nature of the site because, according to IAEA, Syria failed to provide necessary cooperation with the IAEA investigation. Syria has disputed these claims.

On 24 May 2011, IAEA Director General Amano released a report concluding that the destroyed building was "very likely" a nuclear reactor, which Syria had been required to declare under its NPT safeguards agreement. On 9 June 2011, IAEA Board of Governors voted 17-6 (with 11 abstentions) to report this as non-compliance to the UN Security Council.

After the fall of the Assad regime, the IAEA was allowed to inspect the Al Kibar reactor and other related sites. In August 2026, the United States brokered a deal between Syria and Israel allowing the IAEA to remove nuclear material stored at "Site 99" storage facility linked to the reactor, averting a threat by Israel to bomb the site again. According to US and Israeli officials, Site 99 held material from Al Kibar, including uranium in the form of yellowcake.

On 1 September 2026, the IAEA reported that Syria's former Assad regime failed to declare nuclear material and facilities, confirming that infrastructure at Deir ez-Zor was consistent with an unfinished nuclear reactor and identifying about 73 tonnes of natural uranium. In addition to the reactor site, the IAEA identified a fuel fabrication plant and a storage facility for uranium fuel and scrap. The agency said it would continue to monitor the activities at the site. Two days later, the OPCW reported that it had verified the irreversible destruction of 42 aerial bombs in Syria, marking the first verified destruction of Syrian chemical munitions since 2014.

== Delivery systems ==
The U.S. National Air and Space Intelligence Center reported in 2009 that Syria possessed road-mobile Scud-D and Tochka missiles, with fewer than 100 launchers. In addition Syria has aircraft and artillery delivery systems.

== International partnerships ==
United States diplomatic cables revealed that two Indian firms aided Syrian chemical and biological weapon makers in trying to obtain Australia Group-controlled equipment.

In 2012, Iranian and North Korean officials and scientists were brought to bases and testing areas to aid in the development and use of chemical weapons.

In November 2014, the anti-Assad Syrian Observatory for Human Rights reported that five nuclear scientists, one being an Iranian national, were assassinated by a gunman in Damascus. However, the pro-Assad Al-Watan's account differed, reporting that "four nuclear scientists and electrical engineers" were killed, alongside suggesting that Al-Nusra Front might be behind the attack; other sources suspect Israel.

== See also ==
- Syrian Scientific Studies and Research Center, The Syrian government agency and industrial complex, which according to security analysts and western intelligence agencies, is responsible for developing and manufacturing non-conventional weapons.
- Syria Accountability and Lebanese Sovereignty Restoration Act, a 2003 act of the 108th United States Congress which asserts that Syria's acquisition of weapons of mass destruction threatens the security of the Middle East and the national security interests of the United States
