= Syrian chemical weapons program =

Syria's chemical weapons program began in the 1970s with weapons and training from Egypt and the Soviet Union, with production of chemical weapons in Syria beginning in the mid-1980s. Syria's chemical weapons program was one of the largest in the Middle East. For some time, Syria was believed to have the world's third-largest stockpile of chemical weapons, after the United States and Russia. Prior to September 2013 Syria had not publicly admitted to possessing chemical weapons, although Western intelligence services believed it to hold one of the world's largest stockpiles. In September 2013, French intelligence put the Syrian stockpile at 1,000 tonnes, including Yperite, VX and "several hundred tonnes of sarin". At the time, Syria was one of a handful of states which had not ratified the Chemical Weapons Convention. In September 2013, Syria joined the CWC (formally acceding on 14 October), and agreed to the destruction of its weapons, to be supervised by the Organisation for the Prohibition of Chemical Weapons (OPCW), as required by the convention. A joint OPCW-United Nations mission was established to oversee the destruction process. Syria joined OPCW after international condemnation of the August 2013 Ghouta chemical attack, for which Western states held the Syrian government responsible (whilst Syria and Russia held the Syrian rebels of the Syrian civil war responsible) and agreed to the prompt destruction of its chemical weapons.

The destruction of Syria's chemical weapons that the Assad government had declared was completed by August 2014, yet further disclosures, incomplete documentation, and allegations of withholding part of Syria's chemical weapons stockpile since mean that serious concerns regarding chemical weapons and related sites in Syria remain. On 5 April 2017, the government of Syria allegedly unleashed a chemical attack that killed 70 civilians. A suspected chemical attack on Douma on 9 April 2018 that killed at least 49 civilians has been blamed on the Syrian Government.

As of the fall of the Assad regime in December 2024, Syria retained at least some chemical weapons, whose status was thrown into flux with the sudden shift in the Syrian tactical situation. The new government renew full cooperation with OPCW, which re-established its presence in Syria in November 2025. As of May 2026 an OPCW team found more than 70 previously undeclared chemical munitions (rockets and aerial bombs), as well as raw ingredients for the production of sarin. Rockets of the same type as those used in the Ghouta chemical attack were also found.

== Overview ==
=== Public stance ===
Prior to entry into force on 14 October 2013 of Syria's instrument accession, Syria was one of five states that had not signed and seven that had not ratified the Chemical Weapons Convention, which prohibits the development, production, stockpiling, transfer, and use of chemical weapons. However, in 1968, Syria acceded to the 1925 Geneva Protocol for the Prohibition of the Use in War of Asphyxiating, Poisonous or Other Gases. Syria had repeatedly pledged to ratify the CWC if its neighbouring countries, especially Israel, ratify the convention. In the aftermath of the 2003 invasion of Iraq, Syria stated that it had no chemical weapons, but stated it possessed such weapons in 2012. The Syrian president had earlier alluded to a chemical weapon capability in public statements, in 1990 and 1997.

Western non-governmental organisations stated they believed Syria had an active chemical weapons program.

In September 2013, Syria provided information about its stockpile to the OPCW as part of its disarmament obligations. However, the exact composition of its declared chemical arsenal will not be disclosed to the public, due to OPCW rules.

=== Motivation ===
A number of reasons have been postulated for Syria's adoption of a chemical weapon strategy in the 1980s:

- to act as a deterrent to Israeli use of nuclear weapons against Syria
- to compensate for the loss of Egypt as a military ally after the signing of the Egypt–Israel peace treaty in 1979
- after recognising the limitations of Syrian air power against Israel in the 1982 Lebanon War, Syria adopted an alternative missile strategy, which required a non-high-explosive warhead to compensate for lack of missile accuracy
- to act as a deterrent to its powerful neighbour Turkey in any possible dispute.

== Stockpiling and production ==
According to some US analysts, Syria was provided with some chemical weapons and delivery systems prior to the 1973 Yom Kippur War. According to US intelligence reports, Syria began to develop its chemical weapons capabilities in the later 1970s, with supplies and training from the Soviet Union, and likely with equipment and precursor chemicals from private companies in Western Europe. However Syrian production of chemical weapons is not believed to have begun until the mid-1980s. The Director of the US Defense Intelligence Agency said in 2013 that the Syrian program had never become fully independent, and remained reliant on the importing of precursor chemicals.

In 1988, a U.S. analyst described Syria's chemical weapon capability as more advanced than the Iraqi chemical weapons program; however, Israel stated in 1989 that Syria had only the "potential for chemical warfare, but not more than that". In the meantime, a Syrian chemical weapons scientist, dubbed as "the chemist" who was recruited by the CIA from 1988 until his execution in 2001, reported that there was a lab known as "Institute 3,000" near Damascus to manufacture chemical weapons, as later revealed in Joby Warrick's Red Line book.

In July 2007, a Syrian arms depot exploded, killing at least 15 Syrians, as well as 10 Iranians. Jane's Defence Weekly, a U.S. magazine reporting on military and corporate affairs, believed that the explosion happened when Iranian and Syrian military personnel attempted to fit a Scud missile with a mustard gas warhead. Syria stated that the blast was accidental and not chemical related.

=== Capabilities in 2013 ===
A 2007 assessment indicated that Syria was capable of producing several hundred tons of chemical weapon agents per year. Another 2007 report said that Syria was believed to have a stockpile of hundreds of tonnes of chemical weapons agents. Syria was believed to be able to deliver chemical weapons by aerial bombs, surface-to-surface missiles and artillery rockets.

In September 2013, a French intelligence report put the Syrian stockpile at over 1,000 tonnes, including nerve agents and their precursors. This included several hundred tons of Yperite, several hundred tons of sarin, and tens of tons of VX. The report stated that Syria uses a "binary form" technique which demonstrates that Syria has acquired "great knowledge" of chemical weapon technology. As delivery systems the report highlighted as longer-range systems Scud B and Scud C missiles, with a range of 300 and 500 km respectively; and the M-600 (a Syrian version of the Iranian Fateh-110) with a range of 250–300 km. Shorter-range systems include SS21 missiles (70 km); aerial bombs; and artillery rockets and related short-range tactical systems (50 km or less). As of October 2013, some experts believe Syria has around 300 metric tonnes of sulphur mustard and around 700 metric tonnes of nerve agents. By the end of October 2013, the OPCW found a total of 1,300 metric tons of chemical weapons.

According to French intelligence, the Syrian Scientific Studies and Research Centre (SSRC) is responsible for producing toxic agents for use in war. A group named "Branch 450" is allegedly responsible for filling munitions with chemicals and maintaining security of the chemical agent stockpiles.

To provide context for these estimates, 190,000 tons of chemical weapons were manufactured by World War I combatants.

=== Facilities ===
Syrian chemical weapons production facilities have been identified by Western nonproliferation experts at approximately 5 sites, plus one suspected weapons base:

- al-Safira (Scud missile base)
- Hama (Scud missile base)
- Homs
- Latakia
- Palmyra

=== Destruction ===
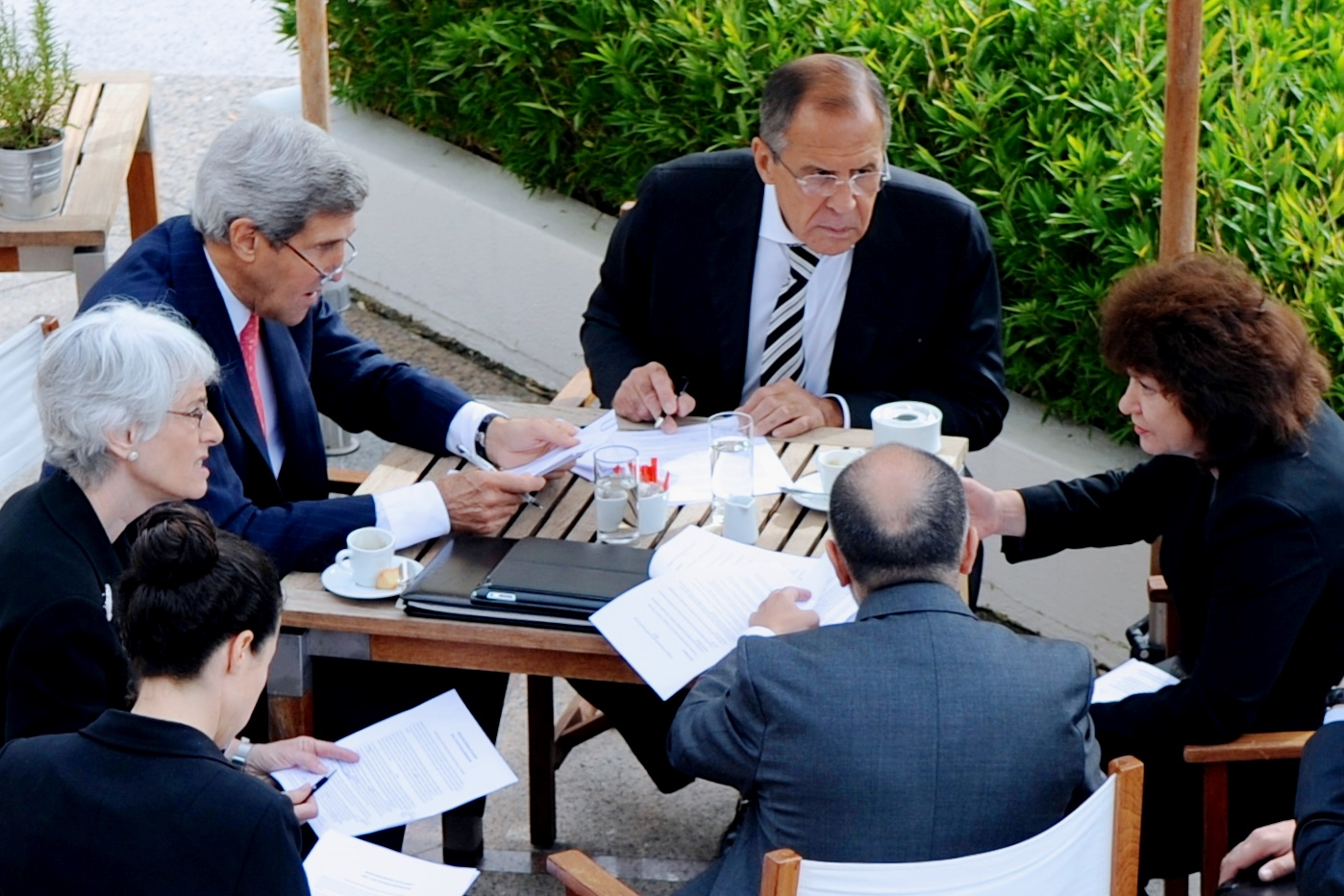
Foreign ministers Sergei Lavrov and John Kerry at the disarmament agreement final negotiating session on 14 September

Following the Ghouta attacks, Secretary-General of the United Nations Ban Ki-moon suggested that he might request that the United Nations Security Council vote to demand that Syria ratify the CWC. On 10 September 2013, Syria announced its intention to join the chemical weapons convention, following a Russian proposal to assist Syria with disposing of their chemical arsenal, and subsequently submitted an instrument of accession to the United Nations as the depositary. Syria formally acceded to the CWC on 14 September 2013, with the convention coming into force for Syria 30 days after their deposit of the instrument of accession on 14 October 2013. In a telephone call with the Organisation for the Prohibition of Chemical Weapons (OPCW) director-general, Syrian Deputy Minister Faisal Mekdad asked for technical assistance and requested that the CWC be provisionally in force prior to its formal entry in force. The OPCW announced that this request had been circulated with its member states.

On 14 September 2013, the United States and Russia announced that they had agreed to a disarmament framework that would eliminate Syria's chemical weapons programs. Under this framework:

- Syria must provide a "comprehensive listing" of its weapons "within a week."
- Equipment for producing, mixing, and filling chemical weapons must be destroyed by November 2013.
- There is to be "complete elimination of all chemical weapons material and equipment in the first half of 2014."

On 27 September 2013, the OPCW agreed on an accelerated program for eliminating Syria's chemical weapons by mid-2014, consistent with this framework. On 16 October 2013, an OPCW-UN Joint Mission was established to oversee this process. The destruction of Syria's chemical weapons was completed by August 2014.

== Use ==
=== Syrian civil war ===
At the outbreak of civil war concerns were raised about both the security of Syria's chemical weapons sites and about the potential use of chemical weapons. In July 2012, Syrian Foreign Ministry spokesman Jihad Makdissi stated that "No chemical or biological weapons will ever be used... All of these types of weapons are in storage and under security and the direct supervision of the Syrian armed forces and will never be used unless Syria is exposed to external aggression."

A Syrian defector who worked inside the chemical weapons network alleged that in January 2012 two senior Syrian officers moved about 100 kg. of chemical weapons materials from a secret military base in Nasiriyah. The Syrian source also described construction of special trucks, which could transport and mix the weapons. These mobile mixers were constructed inside Mercedes or Volvo trucks that were similar to refrigerator trucks. Inside were storage tanks, pipes and a motor to drive the mixing machinery, the defector said.

In September 2012, the Syrian military began moving its chemical weapons from Damascus to the port city of Tartus. That same month, it was reported that the military had restarted testing of chemical weapons at a base on the outskirts of Aleppo. On 28 September, US Defence Secretary Leon Panetta stated that the Syrian government had moved its chemical weapons in order to secure them from approaching opposition forces. It emerged that the Russian government had helped set up communications between the United States and Syria regarding the status of Syria's chemical weapons. Russian Foreign Minister Sergei Lavrov stated that Syria had given the United States "explanations" and "assurances" that it was taking care of the weapons. On 8 December, it was reported that members of the jihadist Al-Nusra Front had recently captured a Saudi-owned toxic chemicals plant outside of Aleppo. On 22 December 2012, Russian Foreign Minister Sergei Lavrov stated that Syria had consolidated chemical weapons into one or two places to prevent rebels capturing them, and that recent moves that had alarmed Western governments were part of this consolidation. Brigadier General Mustafa al-Sheikh, a Syrian army defector, confirmed that most of the chemical weapons have been transported to Alawite areas in Latakia and near the coast. Some chemical munitions remain in bases around Damascus. In December 2012 McClatchy reported various chemical weapons experts' scepticism that Syria was preparing to use chemical weapons, noting their "limited utility" in a civil war situation with fluid battle lines, and Syria's comments that such use would be "suicide" in view of US threats of retaliation.

==== Incidents ====
On 23 December 2012, Al Jazeera released unconfirmed reports that a gas attack killed 7 civilians in the rebel-held al-Bayyada neighbourhood of Homs. Some American officials felt there was a "compelling case" the government forces had used Agent 15, but the White House was initially sceptical.

On 19 March 2013, unconfirmed reports surfaced, after initial reports on the Syrian state news agency SANA, that missiles armed with "chemical materials" may have been fired into the Khan al-Asal district in Aleppo and the Al Atebeh suburbs of Damascus. At the time of the attack, Al Atebeh was held by the opposition. Government forces controlled much of the village of Khan al-Asal; opposition forces held much of the remainder of Aleppo, including areas surrounding Khan al-Asal. Both sides accused each other of carrying out the attack. The Syrian Observatory for Human Rights said that 16 government soldiers and 10 civilians had been killed in the Khan al-Assal chemical attack after a rocket landed on Khan al-Assal, about 300 meters from a military checkpoint. Activists said that the government had tried to hit the rebel-held police academy with a Scud missile, but the missile accidentally landed in a government-controlled area instead. An unnamed Reuters photographer described the gas as having a "chlorine-like smell" and claimed to have witnessed victims suffocating. Officials from within the United States government disputed this claim and stated that there had been no substantive evidence of chemical warfare in Syria, while, the Russian government indicated that it was taking the Syrian government's claim seriously. Unusually, Syria requested that the UN send inspectors to investigate.

In April 2013 Zahir al-Sakit or al-Sakat, a former Syrian army general from the chemical weapons branch, said he had been instructed to use chemical weapons in caves and tunnels that are used by the FSA, during battles in the southwestern area of Hauran. But instead, Sakit disobeyed the orders and swapped the chemicals with disinfectant water he called "Javel water".

After spending two months in the rebel-held Jobar district of Damascus, several reporters for the French news media Le Monde personally witnessed chemical weapons attacks on civilians in the Jobar chemical attacks, holding the Syrian Army responsible.

On 29 April 2013, a chemical attack was reported, in Saraqib, in which 2 died and 13 were injured. The attack was said to involve canisters of white-grey powder dropped from a helicopter. The injured were taken to Turkey. On 5 May, Turkish doctors said initial test show that no traces of sarin had been found in the blood samples of victims. French intelligence acquired blood, urine, earth and munitions samples from victims or sites of attacks on Saraqeb, on 29 April 2013, and Jobar, in mid April 2013. The analysis carried out confirms the use of sarin.

It is believed the SSRC military research center in Jamraya near Damascus, which Israel struck on 5 May 2013, held chemical weapons.

On 21 August 2013, the area of Ghouta was the scene of an alleged Assad government chemical weapons attack that caused the deaths of 1,300 people according to the opposition Local Coordination Committees and the Syrian National Council.

==== Reports ====
On 13 April 2013, The Times reported that British military scientists had found forensic evidence of chemical weapons being used in the conflict, after examining a soil sample smuggled out of Syria. The perpetrators of the probable gas attacks remain unknown.

On 18 April 2013. Britain and France sent a confidential letter to the UN, claiming that there was evidence that the Syrian government had used chemical weapons on more than one occasion since December. Saying that soil samples, witness interviews and opposition sources support charges that nerve agents were used in and around the cities of Aleppo, Homs and possibly Damascus. Israel also claimed that the Syrian government had used chemical weapons on 19 March near Aleppo and Damascus. By 25 April the U.S intelligence assessment was that the Assad government had likely used chemical weapons – specifically sarin gas. However, the White House announced that "much more" work had to be done to verify the intelligence assessments. Syria has refused an investigation team from the UN from entering Syria, though Jeffrey Feltman, UN under-secretary for political affairs, said on Wednesday that a refusal would not prevent an inquiry from being carried out.

A U.N. report in June stated that there were "reasonable grounds" to believe that limited amounts of chemical weapons had been used in at least four attacks in the civil war, but more evidence was needed to determine the exact chemical agents used or who was responsible. Stating that it had not been possible "to determine the precise chemical agents used, their delivery systems or the perpetrator."

In June 2013, British and French authorities claimed to have evidence that Sarin nerve gas has been used in Syria, these findings and evidence have been passed on to the US government. The evidence was largely made up of samples of bodily fluids taken from individuals who claim to have been affected.

On 13 June 2013, the United States announced that there was definitive proof that the Assad government had used limited amounts of chemical weapons on multiple occasions on rebel forces, killing 100 to 150 people.

The UK Joint Intelligence Committee assessed that the Syrian government used lethal CW on at least 14 occasions from 2012 and that the Ghouta attack on 21 August 2013 was undertaken by the Syrian government, concluding that "there are no plausible alternative scenarios to regime responsibility".

==== International reactions ====
On 20 August 2012, President of the United States Barack Obama used the phrase "red line" in reference to the use of chemical weapons in the Syrian civil war, saying, "We have been very clear to the Assad government, but also to other players on the ground, that a red line for us is we start seeing a whole bunch of chemical weapons moving around or being utilised. That would change my calculus. That would change my equation." The phrase became a source of contention when political opponent John McCain said the red line was "apparently written in disappearing ink," due to the perception the red line had been crossed with no action. On the one year anniversary of Obama's red line speech the Ghouta chemical attacks occurred. Obama then clarified "I didn't set a red line. The world set a red line when governments representing 98 percent of the world's population said the use of chemical weapons are abhorrent and passed a treaty forbidding their use even when countries are engaged in war," a reference to the Chemical Weapons Convention.

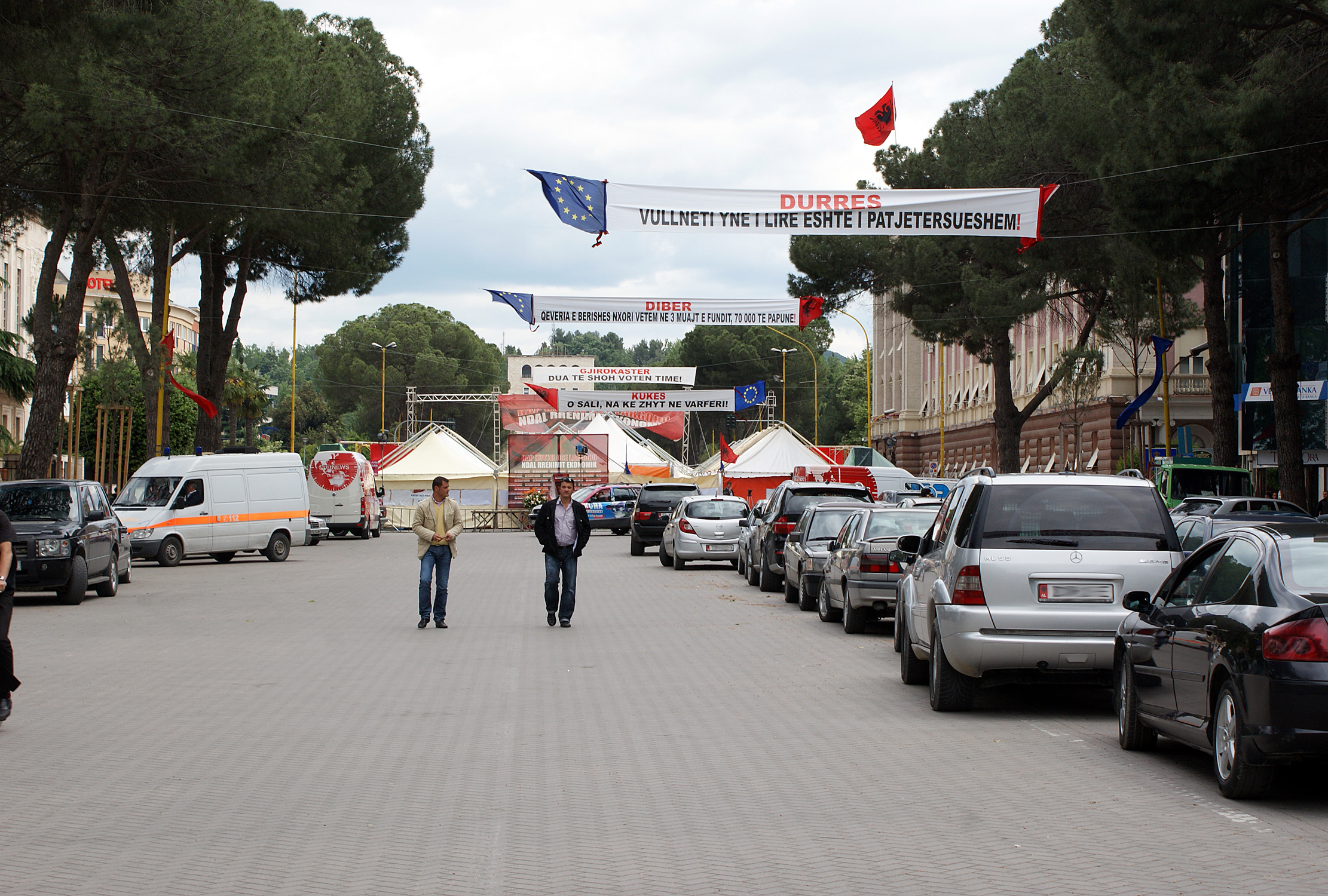
Tirana's Boulevard looking southward

A few days later during a speech given on 31 August 2013 in reaction to the Ghouta chemical attacks, President Obama asked the United States Congress to authorize direct American military intervention in the civil war. The United States Senate Committee on Foreign Relations approved the Authorisation for the Use of Military Force Against the Government of Syria to Respond to Use of Chemical Weapons (S.J.Res 21) on 4 September 2013. If the bill passes, it would allow the president to take direct action for up to 90 days; it specifically forbids putting "boots on the ground."

Protests started in Tirana in November 2013 against the Syrian chemical weapons, which were planned to be destroyed in Albania, probably in the city of Elbasan. On 14 November, around 9:00 people gathered in front of the Parliament of Albania. Some of the female MPs asked the PM to stop this process. The previous day, protesters in Tirana waved placards that read "No to sarin, Yes to oxygen, let us breathe" and "No to chemical weapons in Albania". Former Prime Minister Sali Berisha joined them along with deputies from his party. "We are not going to accept any chemical weapons in Albania, the prime minister has humiliated the Albanians," he said. Mr Edi Rama himself indicated earlier that he was in favour of the proposal. One day later, on 15 November more than 5,000 people, mostly students boycotted the lesson and turned out on the Dëshmorët e Kombit Boulevard in Tirana, as well as in the cities of Korçë, Elbasan, Shkodër, Lezhë and Gjirokastër. In Durrës, they managed to block the main entrance to the country's main harbour. They stayed there waiting for the decision of the PM which was announced around 17:00. During his public speech the PM stated that even if Albania was asked to destroy the chemical weapons, the government wouldn't accept something that is against the will of the Albanians.

== After the fall of Assad ==
After the Fall of the Assad regime on December 8, 2024, international commentators noted that the remaining stocks of chemical weapons in Syria were now unsupervised. The United States expressed concern that the chaotic tactical situation could lead to such weapons falling into the hands of terrorists. The Organisation for the Prohibition of Chemical Weapons (OPCW) stated that it was carefully watching the situation and would try to work with the new government to destroy what chemical weapons remain. In April 2025, the organization determined that over one hundred chemical weapons sites remained in Syria. OPCW re-established its presence in Syria in November 2025.

In May 2026, the OPCW found in northern coastal and central areas in Syria more than 70 previously undeclared chemical munitions (rockets and aerial bombs) from the Assad regime, as well as raw ingredients for the production of sarin. Rockets of the same type as those used in the Ghouta chemical attack were also found.

Syrian authorities have also taken into custody 18 suspects for alleged involvement in chemical weapons program, including several high-level officials. The names were not disclosed, but at least four of them were already on sanctions lists.

In August 2026, the OPCW deployed a team to Syria to verify the destruction of chemical munitions. The team subsequently verified the irreversible destruction of 42 aerial bombs, which was reported by the United Nations on 3 September and marked the first verified destruction of Syrian chemical munitions since 2014.

== See also ==
- Syria and weapons of mass destruction
