= Yellow cake =

Yellow cake may refer to:

- Yellowcake, a uranium concentrate powder
  - Yellowcake scandal, a forged documents scandal in 2001
- Yellow cake, a type of cake that gets its color from the inclusion of egg yolks
