= Suter (computer program) =

Military computer program

Suter is a military computer program developed by BAE Systems that attacks computer networks and communications systems belonging to an enemy. Development of the program has been managed by Big Safari, a secret unit of the United States Air Force. It is specialised to interfere with the computers of integrated air defence systems. Suter was integrated into US unmanned aircraft by L-3 Communications.

Three generations of Suter have been developed. Suter 1 allows its operators to monitor what enemy radar operators can see. Suter 2 lets them take control of the enemy's networks and direct their sensors. Suter 3, tested in summer 2006, enables the invasion of links to time-critical targets such as battlefield ballistic missile launchers or mobile surface-to-air missile launchers.

The program has been tested with aircraft such as the EC-130, RC-135, and F-16CJ. It has been used in Iraq and Afghanistan since 2006.

U.S. Air Force officials have speculated that a technology similar to Suter was used by the Israeli Air Force to thwart Syrian radars and sneak into their airspace undetected in Operation Orchard on September 6, 2007. The evasion of air defence radar was otherwise unlikely because the F-15s and F-16s used by the IAF were not equipped with stealth technology.
