= Mount Suter =

Mountain in New Zealand

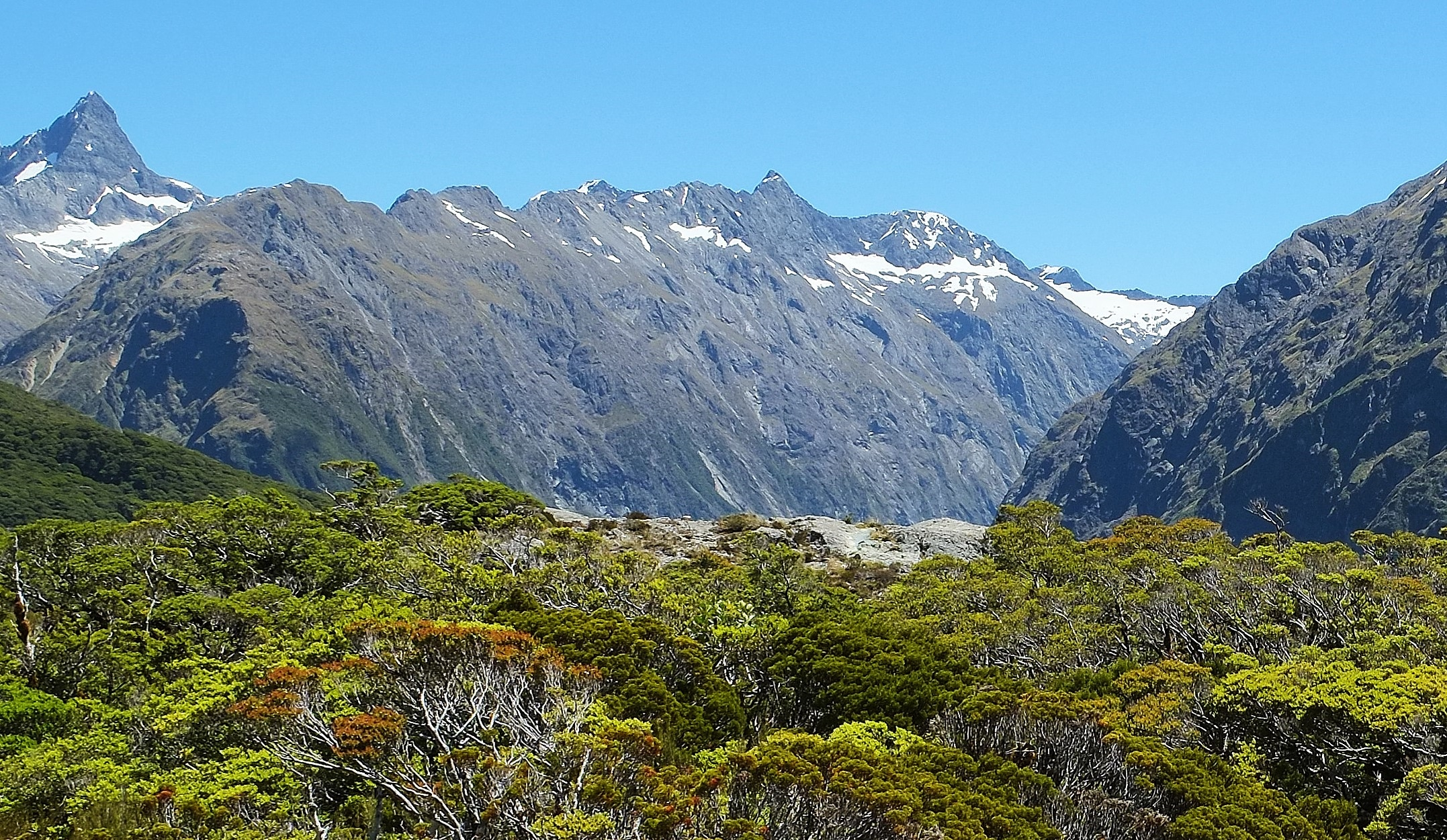
- East aspect, centred

Highest point
- Elevation: 2,094 m (6,870 ft)
- Prominence: 74 m (243 ft)
- Isolation: 0.8 km (0.50 mi)
- Coordinates: 44.81840°S 168.01306°E

Naming
- Etymology: Kurt Robert Suter

Geography
- Location within New Zealand
- Interactive map of Mount Suter
- Location: South Island
- Country: New Zealand
- Region: Southland
- Protected area: Fiordland National Park
- Parent range: Earl Mountains
- Topo map(s): NZTopo50 CC08; NZMS260 D41

Geology
- Rock type: Igneous rock (Gabbronorite)

Climbing
- First ascent: 1959

Mount Suter is a 2,094-metre-elevation (6,870-foot) mountain in Fiordland, New Zealand.

== Description ==
Mount Suter is part of the Earl Mountains and is situated in the Southland Region of the South Island. It is set within Fiordland National Park which is part of the Te Wahipounamu UNESCO World Heritage Site. Precipitation runoff from the mountain's slopes drains into tributaries of the Hollyford River. Topographic relief is significant as the summit rises 1,500 metres (4,921 feet) above the Hollyford Valley in two kilometres, and 1,000 metres (3,281 feet) above Falls Creek Valley in one kilometre. This mountain's toponym was applied by Bill Gordon's first ascent party to honour mountaineering guide Kurt Suter (1908–2004). Suter learned to climb in Switzerland and began guiding at the Hermitage Hotel, Mount Cook Village, New Zealand, in 1930.

== Climate ==
Based on the Köppen climate classification, Mount Suter is located in a marine west coast climate zone. Prevailing westerly winds blow moist air from the Tasman Sea onto the mountains, where the air is forced upwards by the mountains (orographic lift), causing moisture to drop in the form of rain or snow. The months of December through February offer the most favourable weather for viewing or climbing this peak.

== Climbing ==
The first ascent of the summit was made in March 1959 by Bill Gordon, Ralph Miller, Noel Dunlop, and Morrie Davis.

Climbing routes with the first ascents:

- Original Route – Bill Gordon, Ralph Miller, Noel Dunlop, Morrie Davis – (1959)
- South Ridge – Dal Ryan, Colin Lea – (January 1960)
- East Ridge Gully – Jon Taylor, Andy Eccleshall – (2001)
- South Face – Ben Dare, Stephen Skelton – (19 July 2014)

== Gallery ==
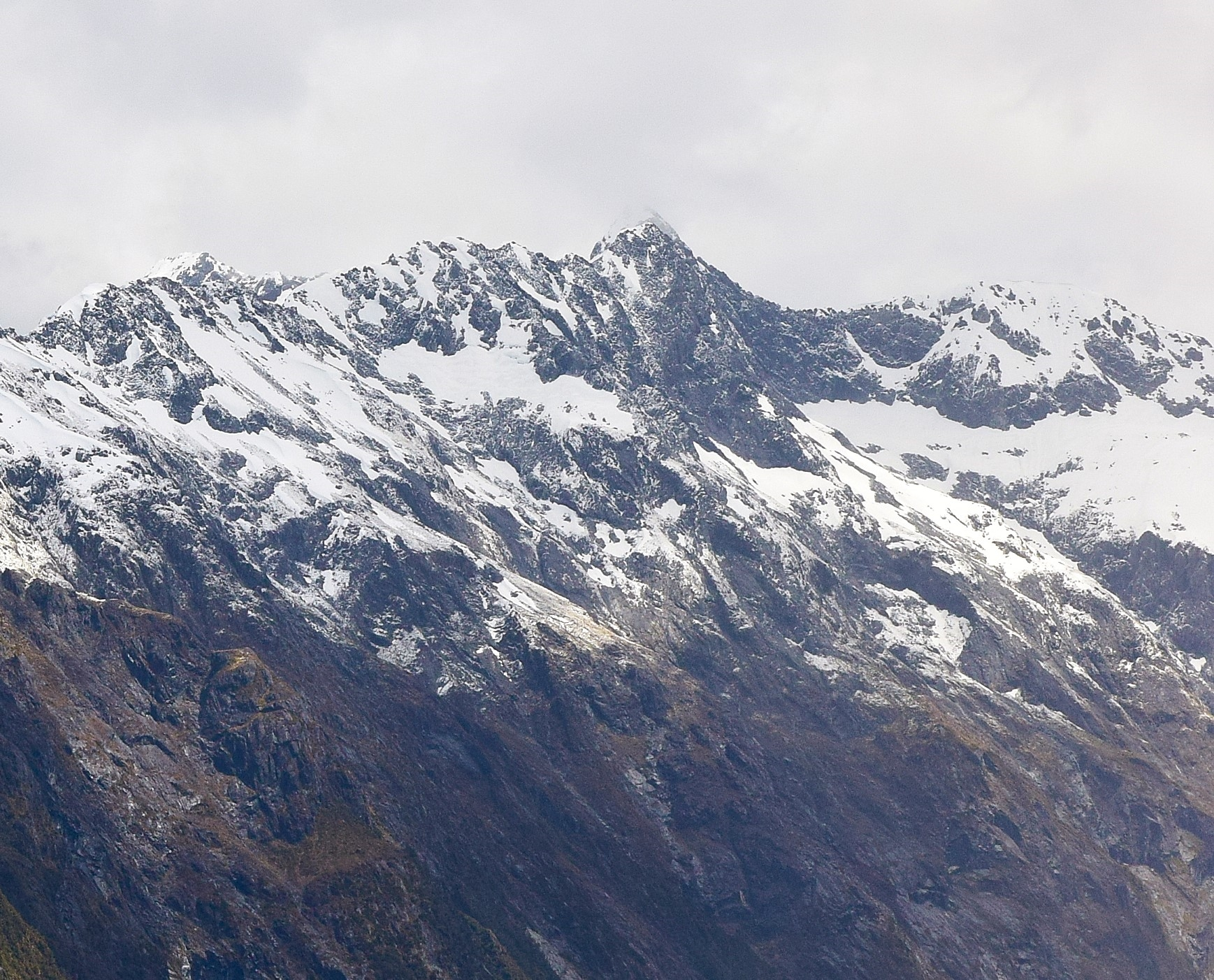
East aspect, from Key Summit

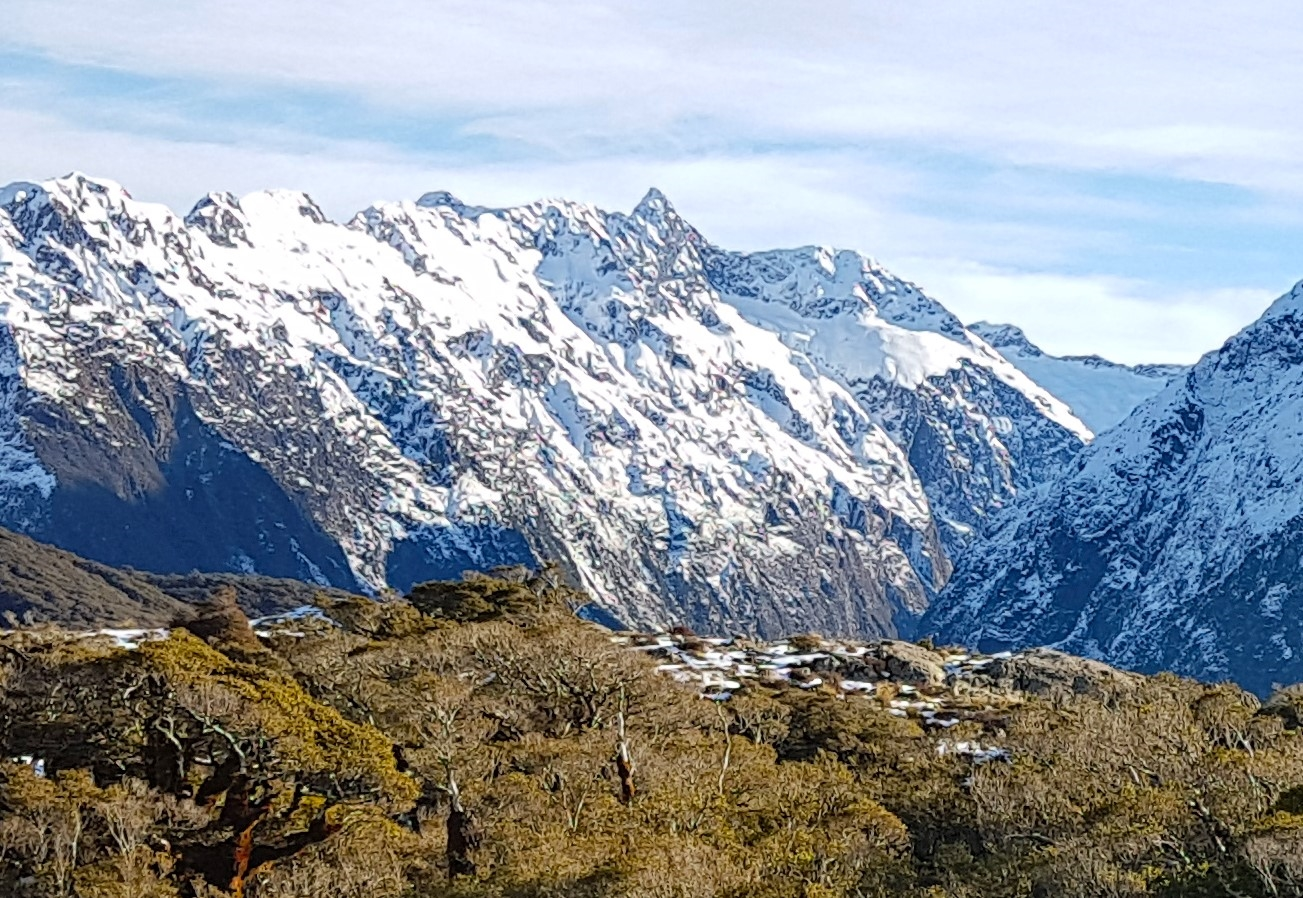
East aspect in winter

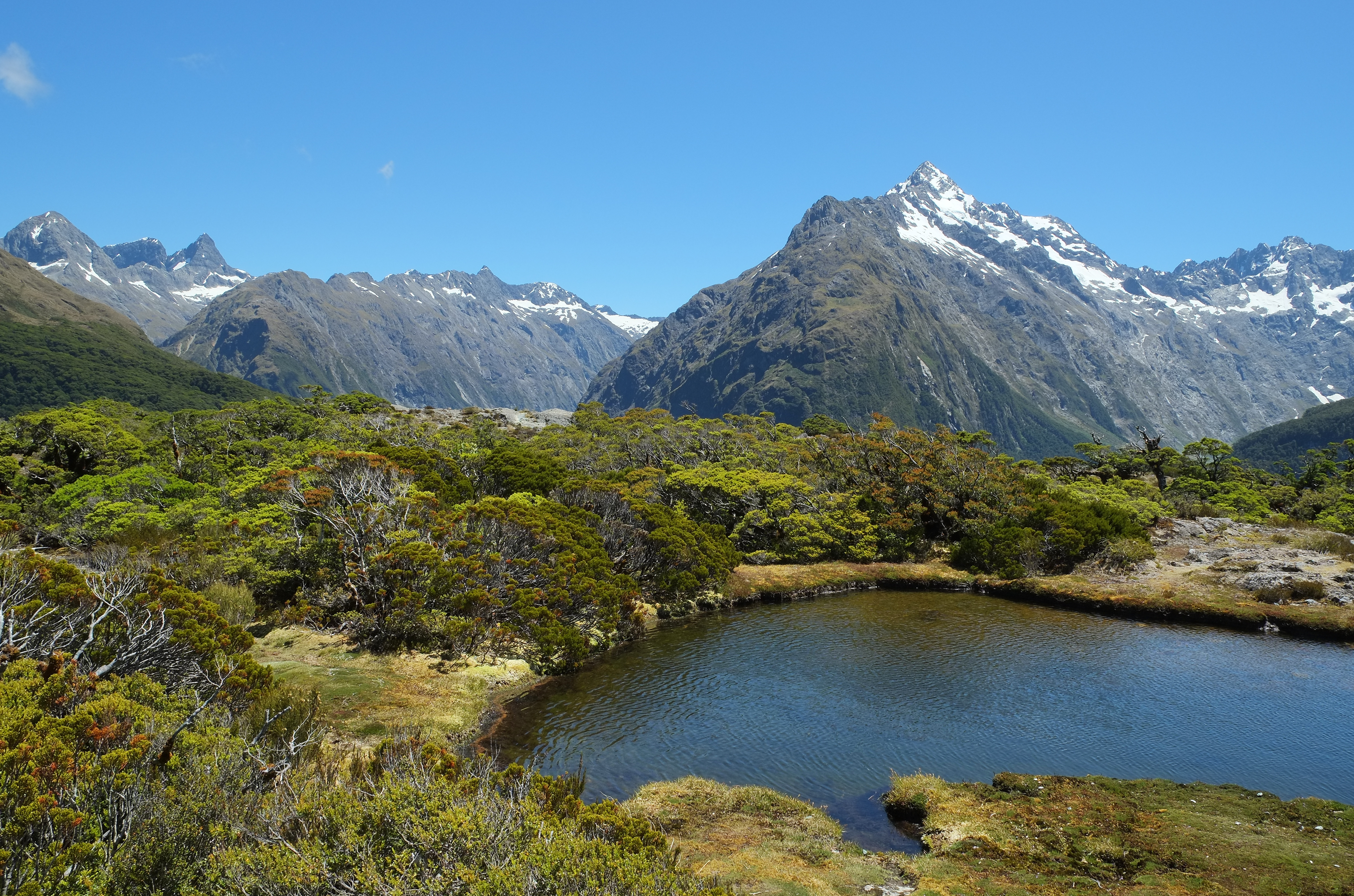
Left to right: Ngatimamoe Peak, Pyramid Peak, Mount Suter, Mount Christina, Mount Crosscut.

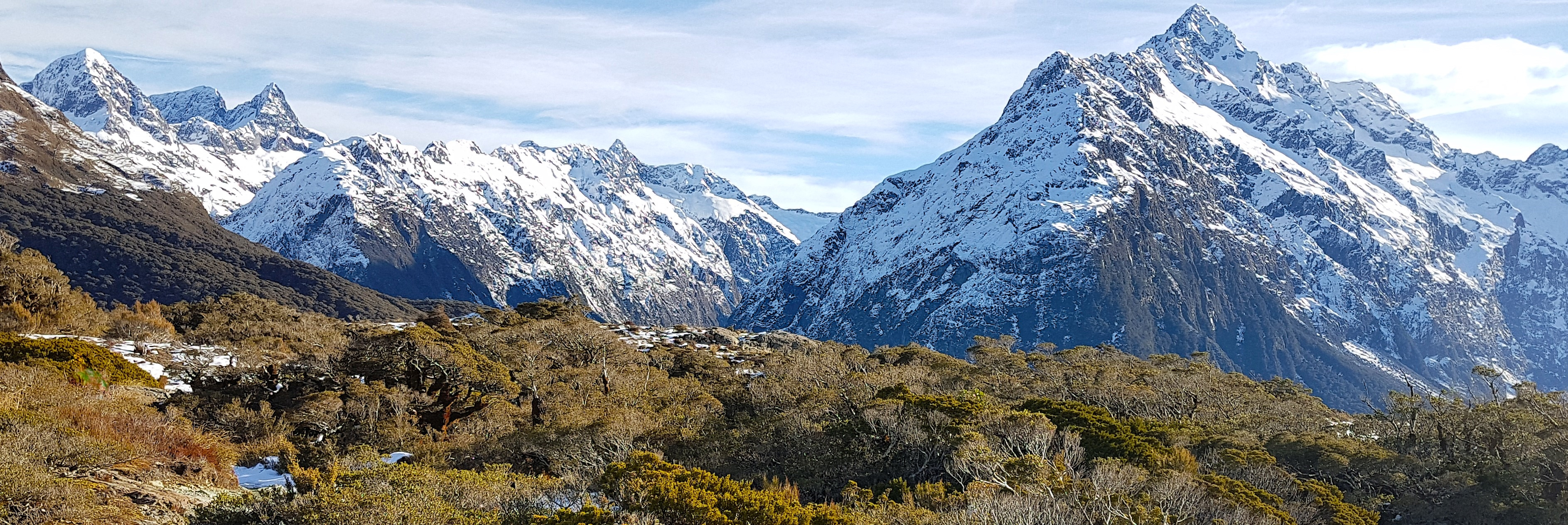
Left to right: Ngatimamoe Peak, Pyramid Peak, Mount Suter, Mount Christina.

== See also ==
- List of mountains of New Zealand by height
