= Suter, West Virginia =

Suter
- Unincorporated community
- Location within the state of West Virginia Suter (the United States)
- Coordinates: 39°37′7″N 80°39′4″W
- Country: United States
- State: West Virginia
- County: Wetzel
- Elevation: 846 ft (258 m)
- Time zone: UTC-5 (Eastern (EST))
  - Summer (DST): UTC-4 (EDT)
- GNIS ID: 1717827

Suter was an unincorporated community in Wetzel County, West Virginia.
