= July 2007 Syrian arms depot explosion =

The July 2007 Syrian arms depot explosion was a blast in July 2007 at a highly secretive Syrian missile base. The Syrian government said the explosion was the result of an accidental detonation of an ammunition dump, but later reports suggested it was the result of a Syrian chemical weapons experiment.

== Official version ==
The explosion happened in Musalmiya, a city in northern Syria near Aleppo, on 26 July 2007. Officials said that high summer temperatures of up to 50 °C set off explosive materials at a military missile base, causing the ammunition dump to explode. Fifteen Syrian nuclear personnel were reportedly killed, (as well as reports of 10 Iranian engineers), and 50 were wounded. Syria said the blast was "not the result of sabotage."

== Skepticism ==
Jane's Defence Weekly published an article in September 2007 explaining purported inaccuracies in the Syrian account. They wrote that the explosion happened at 4:30 a.m., the coolest time of the day, when temperatures would not have reached 50 °C. They also reported that the site was a secret weapons complex that contained an underground silo with a Scud D missile that Iran and North Korea had delivered to Syria.

Instead of high temperatures, the explosion was caused when fuel caught fire in a laboratory as Syrian and Iranian engineers attempted to load a mustard gas warhead onto a Scud-D missile. Fifteen Syrian nuclear technicians and "dozens" of Iranian engineers died in the explosion, according to Jane's report. The blast also sent a chemical cloud of mustard gas as well as Sarin and VX nerve gas across the facility. At least three North Korean missile engineers were killed in the blast as well.

Syria is believed to have an active chemical weapons program as well as several hundred Scud missiles.

The reports coincided with speculation about the Israeli air strike on Syria earlier in September 2007, which was reported to have targeted a nuclear facility.
