= MV Cape Ray =

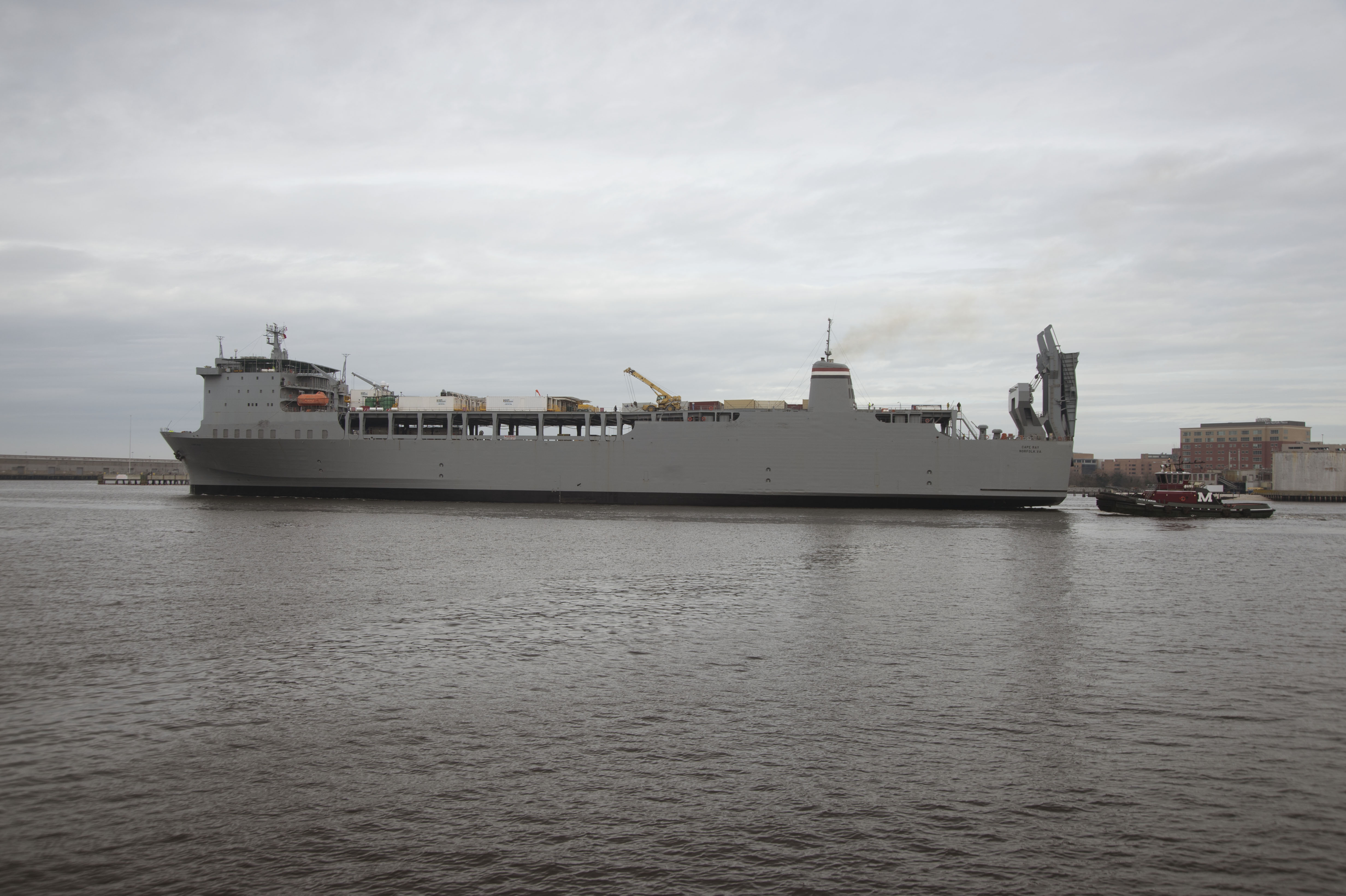
- MV Cape Ray (T-AKR-9679) in 2014

History

United States
- Name: Cape Ray
- Owner: Maritime Administration (MARAD)
- Builder: Kawasaki Heavy Industries Ltd., Japan
- Acquired: 17 Dec 1994
- Identification: IMO number: 7530810; MMSI number: 366841000; Callsign: KAFI

General characteristics
- Class & type: MV Cape Rise (T-AKR-9678)
- Displacement: 32,054 tons
- Length: 647 ft 6 in (197.36 m)
- Beam: 105 ft 6 in (32.16 m)
- Draft: 32 ft 6 in (9.91 m)
- Propulsion: two Kawasaki-MAN 14V 52/55A diesel engines; 1 shaft, 28,000 hp (21,000 kW)
- Speed: 19.75 knots (36.58 km/h; 22.73 mph).

The 648-foot roll-on/roll-off and container ship MV Cape Ray (T-AKR-9679), built in 1977, was previously known as MV Saudi Makkah and MV Seaspeed Asia. She can carry 1,315 containers and has both bow and stern thrusters.

After being acquired on 29 April 1994, MV Cape Ray (T-AKR-9679) was in the Ready Reserve Force. She is generally used to transport vehicles to war zones from the United States.

== Syrian weapons destruction ==
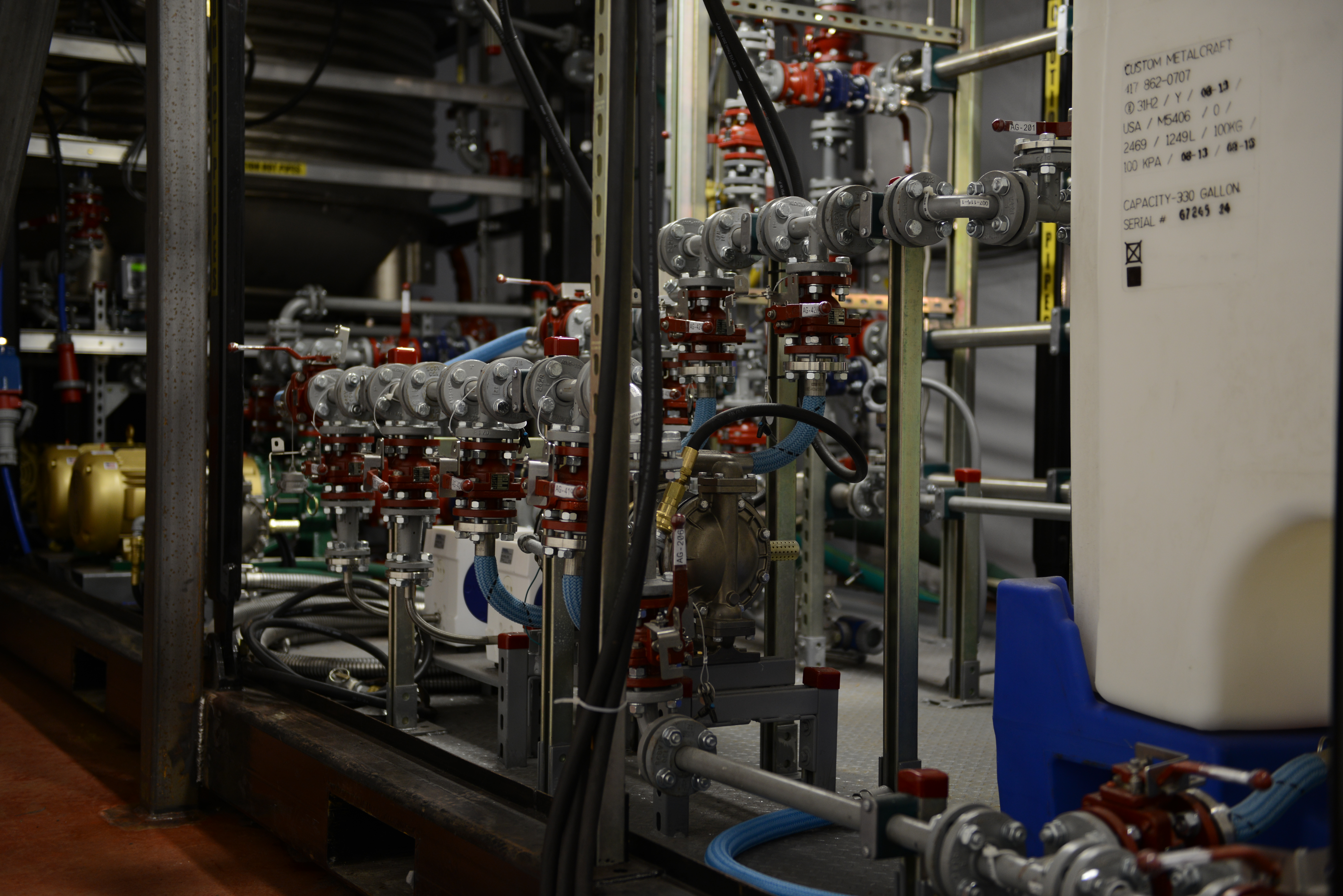
Some of the chemical weapons destruction equipment deployed on MV Cape Ray

Cape Ray played a central role in the 2014 destruction of Syria's declared stockpile of chemical weapons. For that mission she was under the command of civilian master Horace "Rick" Jordan. The ship was outfitted with two Field Deployable Hydrolysis Systems operated by United States Army civilians, who then performed the destruction operations at sea.

On 16 January 2014 the Italian Minister of Infrastructures and Transports, Maurizio Lupi, said that MV Cape Ray would load 530 tons of chemical weapons material in the port of Gioia Tauro in Calabria, Italy, from the Danish ship MV Ark Futura. She deployed on 25 June 2014.
