= Destruction of Syria's chemical weapons =

Part of the Syrian peace process

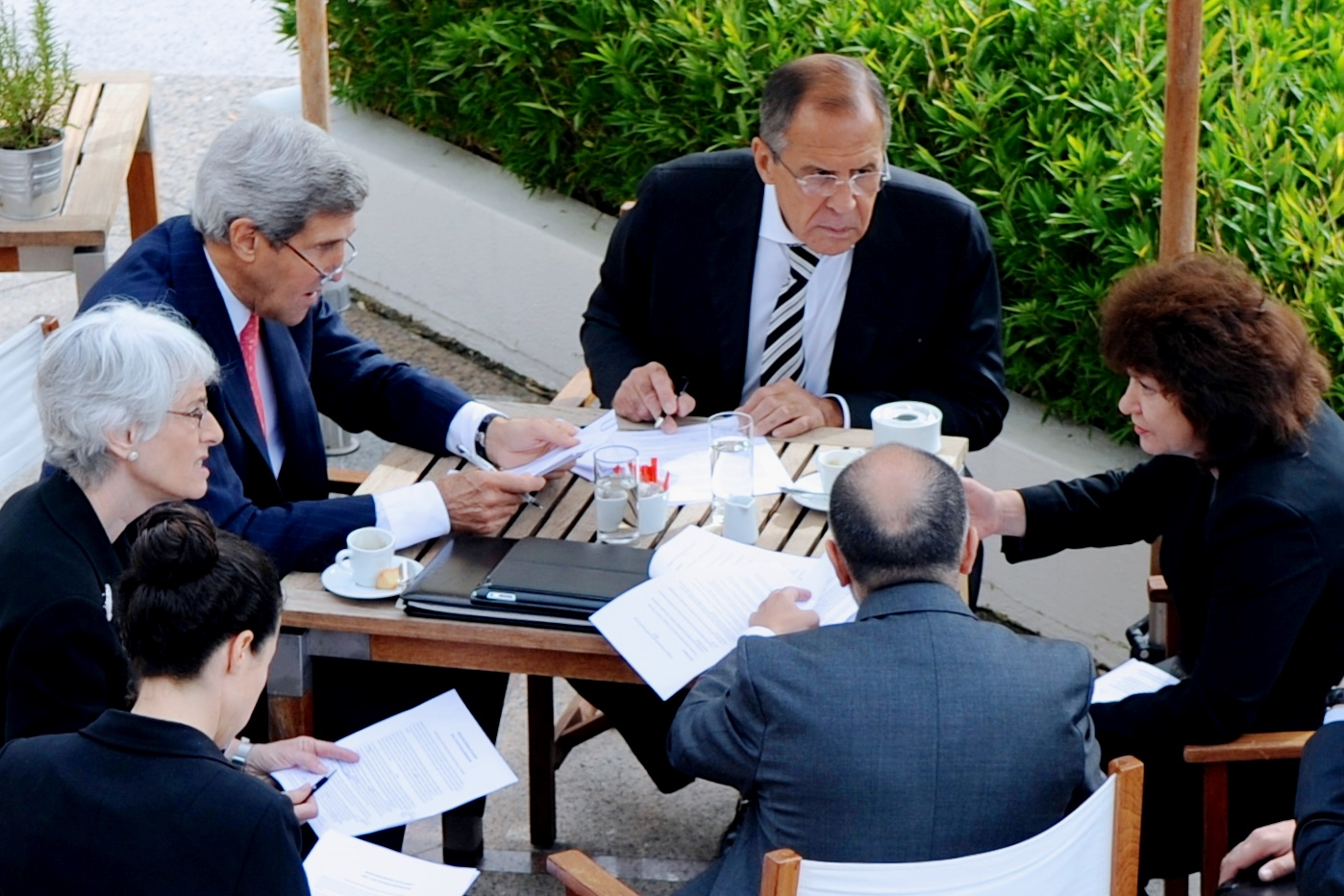
Sergei Lavrov and John Kerry at the final negotiating session on 14 September

The destruction of Syria's chemical weapons began on 14 September 2013 after Syria entered into several international agreements which called for the elimination of Syria's chemical weapon stockpiles and set a destruction deadline of 30 June 2014. Also on 14 September 2013, Syria acceded to the Chemical Weapons Convention (CWC) and agreed to its provisional application pending its entry into force on 14 October. Having acceded to the CWC, the Organisation for the Prohibition of Chemical Weapons (OPCW) Executive Council on 27 September approved a detailed implementation plan that required Syria to assume responsibility for and follow a timeline for the destruction of Syrian chemical weapons (such as sarin) and Syrian chemical weapon production facilities. Following the signing of the Framework Agreement on 14 September 2013 and after the OPCW implementation plan, on 27 September the United Nations Security Council unanimously adopted Resolution 2118 which bound Syria to the timetable set out in the OPCW implementation plan. The joint OPCW-UN mission was established to oversee the implementation of the destruction program.

The OPCW began preliminary inspections of Syria's chemical weapons arsenal on 1 October 2013, and actual destruction began on 6 October. Under OPCW supervision, Syrian military personnel began "destroying munitions such as missile warheads and aerial bombs and disabling mobile and static mixing and filling units". The destruction of Syria's declared chemical weapons production, mixing, and filling equipment was successfully completed by 31 October deadline, but the destruction of chemical weapon stockpiles fell well behind schedule, which had been scheduled for completion by 6 February 2014. Only on 23 June 2014, were the remaining declared chemicals shipped out of Syria for destruction. The destruction of the most dangerous chemicals was performed at sea aboard the Cape Ray, a vessel of the United States Maritime Administration's Ready Reserve Force, crewed with U.S. Navy and civilian merchant mariners. The actual destruction operations, performed by a team of U.S. Army civilians and contractors, destroyed 600 metric tons of chemical agents in 42 days. By 18 August 2014, all of the remaining declared and surrendered chemicals had been destroyed offshore. On 4 January 2016, the OPCW stated that destruction was completed, though since then the use of chemical weapons on numerous occasions by the Syrian military has been verified.

The agreement by Syria to destroy its chemical weapons arose at a time when the United States and France headed a coalition of countries on the verge of carrying out air strikes on Syria in response to the 21 August 2013 Ghouta chemical-weapon attacks. To avoid a military intervention, on 14 September 2013, the United States, Russia and Syria agreed to the "Framework for Elimination of Syrian Chemical Weapons". Chlorine, a common industrial chemical, is outside the scope of the disarmament agreement; however, its use as a poison gas would violate the Chemical Weapons Convention, which Syria joined in 2013. Various parties, including Western governments, have accused Assad of conducting illegal chlorine attacks since 2014.

Western officials, such as British Ambassador Mark Lyall Grant, and Professor Stephen R. Irwin, had expressed concerns about the completeness of Syria's disclosures, and said the OPCW mission should remain in place following removal of chemical weapons until verification tasks can be completed. A late disclosure in 2014 regarding Syria's ricin program raised doubts about completeness of the government's declaration of its chemical weapons stockpile, and in early May 2015, OPCW announced that inspectors had found traces of sarin and VX nerve agent at a military research site in Syria that had not been declared previously by the Assad regime. Syria appeared to bomb Khan Shaykhun with sarin in April 2017. A chemical attack on Douma on 7 April 2018 that killed at least 49 civilians and injured scores more has been blamed on the Assad government, though the Syrian government denied these charges. In March 2023, the UN Security Council declared Syria's Chemical Weapons disarmament claims "incomplete" and UN Disarmament chief Izumi Nakamitsu stated that Syrian declarations "cannot be considered accurate", violating the Chemical Weapons Convention.

== Background ==
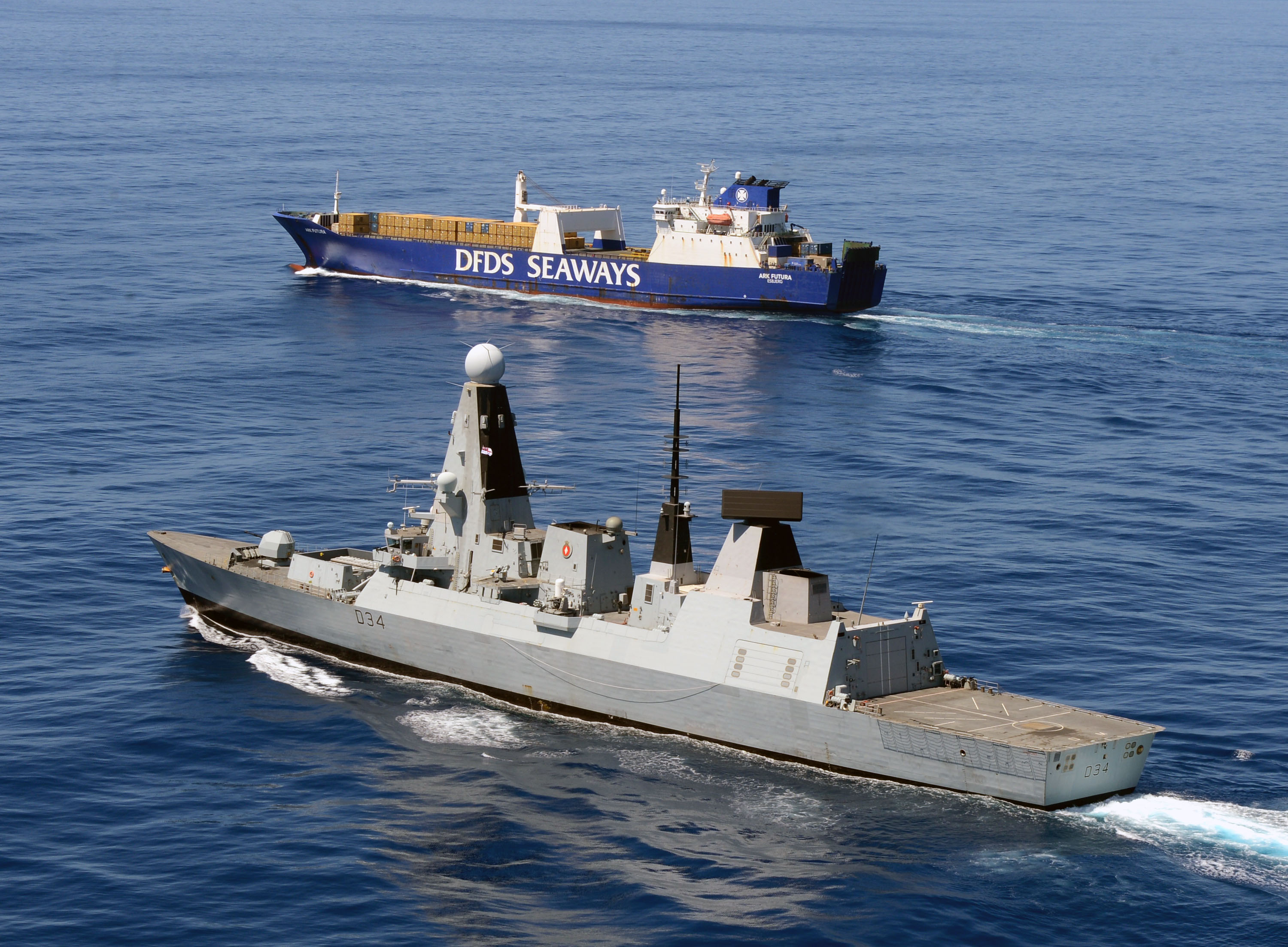
HMS Diamond escorts MV Ark Futura (top) transporting chemicals from Syria, Feb 2014

For some time, though Syria denied possession of chemical weapons, Syria was believed to have the world's third-largest stockpile of chemical weapons, after the United States and Russia. With the outbreak of the Syrian Civil War in 2011 concerns were raised about both the security of Syria's chemical weapon sites and about the potential use of chemical weapons.

On 21 August 2013, rockets containing the chemical agent sarin struck several opposition-controlled or disputed areas of the Ghouta suburbs of Damascus, resulting in the death of more than 300 people and injury to thousands in the Ghouta chemical attack. President Barack Obama used the phrase "red line" in reference to the use by Syria of chemical weapons. The United States and other Western countries blamed the Syrian government for the attack, while Syria blamed civil war opposition forces. In response to Ghouta, a coalition of countries led by the United States and France, which support the rebels, threatened air strikes on Syria. Russia, a key ally of Syria, along with China had earlier blocked efforts by the United States, France, and the UK to secure United Nations Security Council approval for military intervention. The United States and France headed a coalition of countries on the verge of carrying out air strikes on Syria.

During the G20 summit on 6 September, Russian President Vladimir Putin and U.S. President Barack Obama discussed the idea of putting Syria's chemical weapons under international control. On 9 September 2013, U.S. Secretary of State John Kerry stated in response to a question from a journalist that the air strikes could be averted if Syria turned over "every single bit" of its chemical weapons stockpiles within a week, but Syria "isn't about to do it and it can't be done". State Department officials stressed that Kerry's statement and its one-week deadline were rhetorical in light of the unlikelihood of Syria turning over its chemical weapons. Hours after Kerry's statement, Russian foreign minister Sergey Lavrov announced that Russia had suggested to Syria that it relinquish its chemical weapons, and Syrian foreign minister Walid al-Moallem immediately welcomed the proposal, and U.S.–Russian negotiations led to the 14 September 2013 "Framework for Elimination of Syrian Chemical Weapons", which called for the elimination of Syria's chemical weapon stockpiles by mid-2014. Following the agreement, Syria acceded to the Chemical Weapons Convention and agreed to apply that convention provisionally until its formal entry into force on 14 October 2013. On 21 September, Syria ostensibly provided a list of its chemical weapons to the OPCW, before the deadline set by the framework.

On 27 September, the Executive Council of the OPCW adopted a decision, "Destruction of Syrian Chemical Weapons", a detailed implementation plan based on the U.S./Russian agreement. Later on 27 September, the UN Security Council unanimously passed United Nations Security Council Resolution 2118, incorporating the OPCW plan and making it binding on Syria. A joint OPCW-UN mission to supervise the destruction or removal of Syria's chemical arms, while its Director-General was charged with notifying the Executive Council regarding any delay in implementation. The Executive Council was to decide whether the non-compliance should be reported to the Security Council, which was responsible to ensure that Syria fulfilled its commitments under Resolution 2118.

(According to Rolling Stone, White House staff stated off the record that Obama and Putin had already privately agreed in principle to start peacefully relieving Assad of his chemical weapons by 5 September, days earlier than the 9 September public breakthrough.)

As a result of these negotiations, in September 2013 Syria joined the Chemical Weapons Convention (formally acceding on 14 October), and agreed to the destruction of its chemical weapons, under the supervision of the Organisation for the Prohibition of Chemical Weapons, as required by the convention.

== Framework for Elimination of Syrian Chemical Weapons ==
=== Negotiations and agreement ===
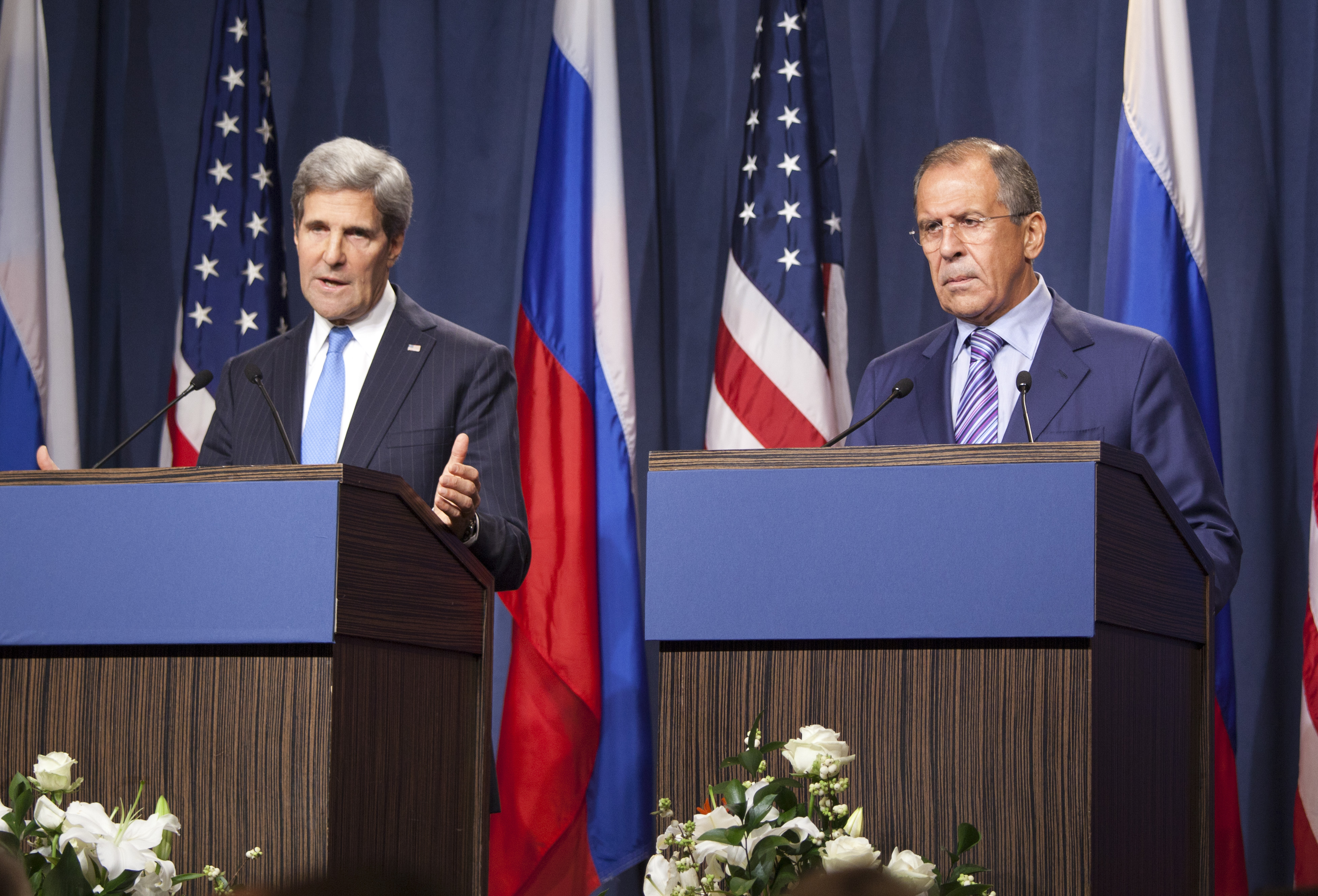
U.S. Secretary of State John Kerry and Russian Foreign Minister Sergey Lavrov on 12 September, at beginning of Syrian chemical weapons talks

From 12 to 14 September 2013, details of the Framework for Elimination of Syrian Chemical Weapons were negotiated at the InterContinental Hotel in Geneva, Switzerland. High-level negotiations were held between Kerry and Lavrov, with large teams of experts simultaneously working on technical details. A key breakthrough was reported to occur when the U.S. and Russia agreed on their approximations of the Syrian chemical weapon stockpile (estimated at 1,000 tons of sarin, mustard agent and VX nerve agent). On 14 September 2013, the Framework was agreed and signed.

On the same day, after the signing, Syria announced that it was acceding to the Chemical Weapons Convention (provisionally applying it directly, but formally taking effect 14 October 2013), and in doing so becoming a member of the OPCW. This committed Syria not to use chemical weapons, to destroy its chemical weapons within 10 years, and to convert or destroy all of its chemical weapons production facilities.

=== Overview and enforcement ===
In the Framework, formally "Framework for the Elimination of Syrian Chemical Weapons", Russia and the United States agreed to the following target dates:

- Syria to provide a comprehensive listing of its weapons to the OPCW by 21 September 2013
- initial OPCW on-site inspections of declared sites to be completed by November 2013
- equipment for producing, mixing, and filling chemical weapons to be destroyed by November 2013
- all chemical weapons material and equipment to be eliminated in the first half of 2014

The Framework states that, in the event of noncompliance, the UN Security Council should impose measures under Chapter VII of the UN Charter. The Framework does not state how Syria's compliance would be measured, or what the penalties Syria would incur if it did not comply. Under the UN Charter, Chapter VII measures range from "demonstrations" to sanctions or military action and could be vetoed by any of the five permanent members of the Security Council. Russia and China had previously vetoed three resolutions attempting to condemn or sanction Syria, and were considered likely to block any future Security Council sanctioned military action against Syria. The U.S. indicated it might resort to military action outside the UN if Syria failed to comply with the Security Council resolution requiring it to eliminate its chemical weapons.

Chlorine, a common industrial chemical which would later allegedly be used in poison-gas attacks inside Syria in 2014, is not on the list of prohibited chemicals covered by the disarmament agreement.

=== Reactions to the Framework ===
The Framework was received positively by France, Germany, the UK, the European Union, China, and the Arab League. Israel expressed cautious optimism, but was skeptical that Syria would comply.

Ali Haidar, Syria's Minister of National Reconciliation, praised the agreement as "a victory for Syria that was achieved thanks to our Russian friends". He described the agreement as removing a pretext for a U.S. attack on the country. Iran also stated that the agreement had deprived the U.S. of a pretext for attacking Syria.

Leaders of the main rebel coalition, the Syrian National Coalition, were angered by the agreement. The U.S., without consulting the coalition, had changed its mind about striking Syria. Rebels furthermore worried the agreement might be a considered a de facto admission of the Bashar al-Assad government's legitimacy.

== OPCW Executive Council decision ==
Headquarters of the OPCW in The Hague

The Executive Council of the OPCW met on 27 September and adopted a decision, "Destruction of Syrian Chemical Weapons", that is a detailed and accelerated plan for the elimination of Syria's chemical weapons. The Executive Council also approved Syria's provisional application of the Chemical Weapons Convention pending entry into force on 14 October. The plan adds detail to but does not vary from the basic deadlines in the U.S.–Russian Framework. The OPCW stated that the Executive Council had agreed on "an accelerated programme for achieving the complete elimination of Syria's chemical weapons by mid-2014. The decision requires inspections in Syria to commence from 1 October 2013."

Inspectors were given unusually broad authority because Syria was required under the plan to provide inspectors unobstructed access to any suspected chemical weapons site, even if the Syrian government had not identified the location in its list of chemical weapons sites, and without the special procedures normally required for "Challenge Inspections" under Article IX of the convention.

The decision also stipulates that if the OPCW Director-General determined there had been a delay in implementation of the decision, the matter should be discussed within 24 hours, when it should be decided whether the matter should be submitted to the UN Security Council.

The Executive Council's decision further calls, "on an urgent basis", for funding by member states of the Syrian chemical weapons elimination process.

=== Requirements for Syria ===
Under the Decision, which was incorporated into Security Council Resolution 2118, Syria is required to take the following actions:

1. submit to the Secretariat by 4 October further information (to that provided on 19 September 2013) on its chemical weapons, in particular: "(i) the chemical name and military designator of each chemical in its chemical weapons stockpile, including precursors and toxins, and quantities thereof; (ii) the specific type of munitions, sub-munitions, and devices in its chemical weapons stockpile, including specific quantities of each type that are filled and unfilled; and (iii) the location of all of its chemical weapons, chemical weapons storage facilities, chemical weapons production facilities, including mixing and filling facilities, and chemical weapons research and development facilities, providing specific geographic coordinates",
2. submit the declaration required by Article III of the Chemical Weapons Convention to the OPCW Secretariat no later than 27 October,
3. complete elimination of all its chemical weapons material and equipment during the first half of 2014, "subject to the detailed requirements, including intermediate destruction milestones, to be decided by the [Executive] Council not later than 15 November 2013",
4. complete destruction of its chemical weapons mixing/filling and production equipment by 1 November,
5. cooperate fully with Decision implementation, including providing OPCW personnel with "immediate and unfettered right to inspect any and all sites in the Syrian Arab Republic", and
6. designate one official as the OPCW Secretariat's main point of contact and provide that person with authority to ensure that the Decision is fully implemented.

== Security Council Resolution 2118 ==
Negotiations over the Security Council resolution were initially contentious, as the United States, the United Kingdom and France submitted a draft resolution that included an automatic invocation of Chapter VII, sanctioning use of military force if Syria failed to fulfill its commitments under the agreement. Russia and China continued to maintain its opposition to any military action against Syria under Chapter VII, without a second vote of the Security Council. After further negotiations, on 26 September the five permanent members of the UN Security Council reached agreement on an implementation and enforcement draft resolution. On the following day, just hours after the OPCW Executive Council approved a detailed implementation plan for the Framework Agreement, Security Council Resolution 2118 was unanimously passed, making the OPCW implementation plan binding on the Syrians.

The resolution required Syria to eliminate its chemical weapon stockpiles and allow complete access to UN and OPCW chemical weapons inspectors. If Syria did not comply with either demand, the Security Council would need to adopt a second resolution regarding imposition of military or other actions against Syria under Chapter VII. The vote on the resolution was delayed until 27 September because the OPCW needed to vote first on its detailed implementation plan. Syria vowed to abide by the resolution.

Russian Foreign Minister Lavrov has stressed that the Western and Arab-backed rebels in the Syrian civil war must also comply with the UN resolution, and must ensure that extremists do not acquire chemical weapons. "The responsibility is not only on the Syrian government," he stated, "but also on the opposition and all the states in this sphere should of course not allow these weapons to fall into the hands of non-state actors."

== Implementation ==
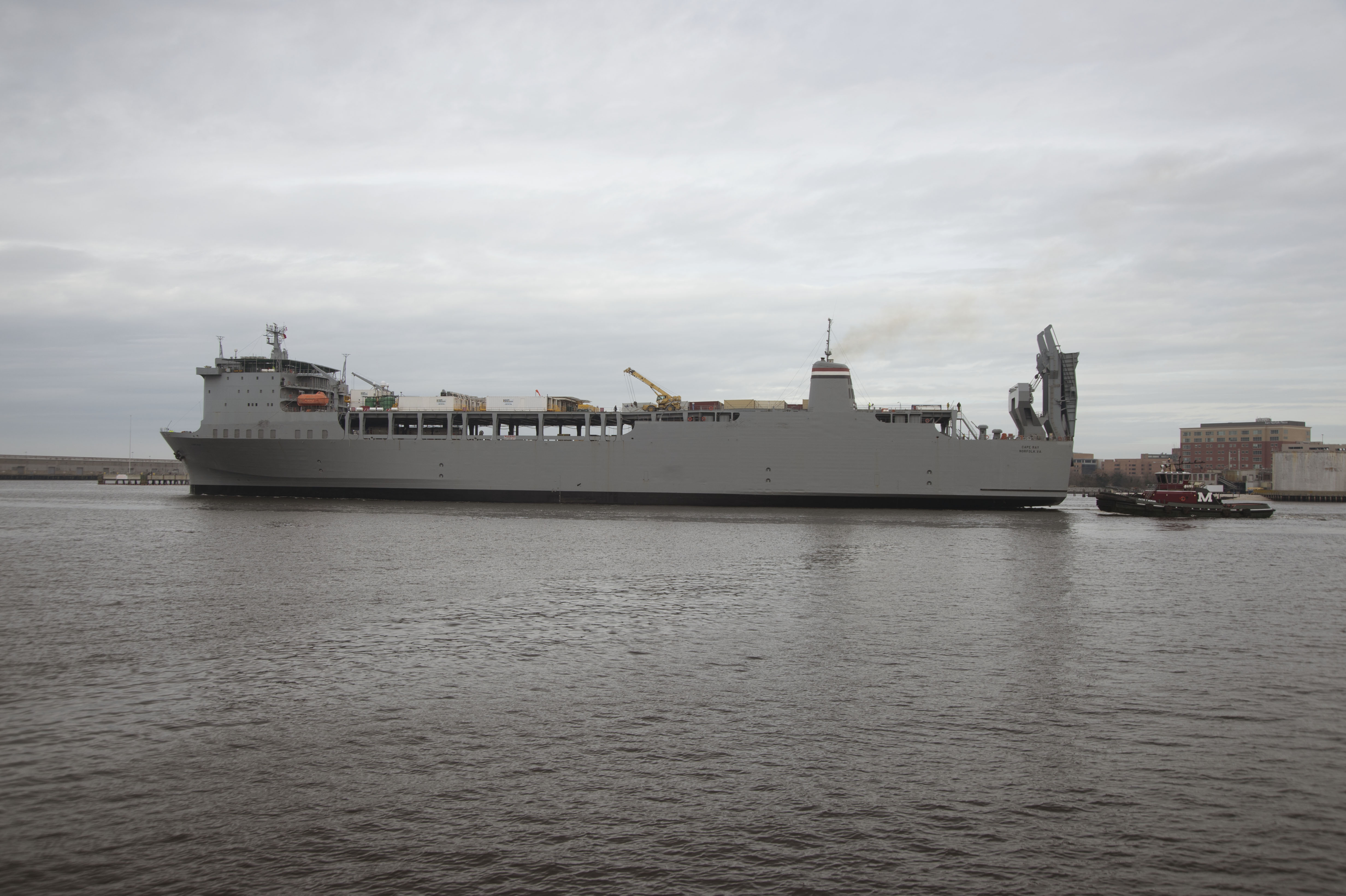
The highest-priority chemicals were destroyed on the 648-foot MV Cape Ray.

=== Declared sites and chemical weapons ===
On 21 September 2013, Syria provided the OPCW with a comprehensive chemical weapons disclosure, ostensibly meeting the Framework's first deadline. Syria declared 23 sites, the location of which are not disclosed for confidentiality and security reasons. On these sites a combined 41 facilities were present containing "1,300 tons of chemical precursors and agents and 1,230 unfilled munitions".

According to U.S. chemical weapons nonproliferation expert Amy Smithson, declared sites are believed to include:

- four production facilities near Safira, Khan Abu Shamat, Homs, and Hama
- six storage facilities near Safira, Homs, Hama, Furqlus, Latakia, and Palmyra
- a research and development site in Damascus.

=== Preparations and preliminary inspections ===
Within 24 hours of having received an "initial declaration" document from Syria, the OPCW started a review of the inventory. The OPCW stated that it would use on-site inspections to verify the accuracy of the disclosure by Syria. It would also "assist in putting into place arrangements to keep the warfare materials and the relevant facilities secure until their destruction".

The OPCW began preliminary inspections of Syria's disclosed chemical weapons arsenal on 1 October 2013, and actual destruction of Syrian equipment began on 6 October 2013, with Syrian personnel under OPCW supervision applying angle grinders and cutting torches to "a wide range of items". Specifically, under OPCW supervision Syrian military personnel had begun "destroying munitions such as missile warheads and aerial bombs and disabling mobile and static mixing and filling units". The U.S. and Russia announced themselves "very pleased" with the rapid pace of Syria's chemical arms disarmament. The Economist commented that the demanding timeline may mean the OPCW will deploy ad-hoc destruction methods such as sledgehammers, tanks, or concrete fills.

On Monday 7 October, UN Secretary-General Ban Ki-moon stated that the UN-OPCW joint mission would eventually have about 100 personnel in Syria, with a support base in Cyprus. In a letter to the Security Council, Ban set out the mission's three phases: establish an initial presence and verify Syria's stockpiles declaration; oversee chemical weapons destruction; and verify destruction of all chemical arms related materials and programs. On 13 October Ban announced that veteran UN diplomat Sigrid Kaag would head the joint UN-OPCW mission.

=== Implementation challenges ===
UN Secretary-General Ban in early October publicly recognized many of the challenges of the weapons destruction effort, in particular, the dangerous nature of chemical arms destruction during a civil war, especially in urban areas such as Damascus, Aleppo, and Homs. "Heavy artillery, airstrikes, mortar barrages and the indiscriminate shelling of civilian areas are commonplace and battle lines shift quickly," he wrote. Ban added that the most challenging phase of the destruction effort would begin in November when OPCW and UN experts begin destroying Syria's estimated 1,000 tons of precursor chemicals and chemical weapons. In order to do so, they will need to cross battle lines between governments and rebel forces. The Syrian government and Western-backed opposition forces have pledged cooperation with chemical disarmament, but Al Qaeda-linked rebel groups, including Al Nusra Front and the Islamic State of Iraq and Syria, have not.

OPCW director-general Ahmet Uzumcu stated in early October that completing the destruction process by the mid-2014 deadline will depend on whether temporary cease-fires can be arranged between opposition and government forces. A nine-month ceasefire to allow the OPCW to carry out the entire chemical weapons destruction process was rejected by the Free Syrian Army (FSA), according to a report in Asharq Al-Awsat (a Saudi-linked pan-Arab newspaper).

Also exceptionally challenging will be the movement and destruction of deadly agents such as sarin, VX nerve agents, and mustard agent during the civil war. The chemical weapons convention disallows movement of such deadly agents outside the country holding them, but Security Council Resolution 2118 allows extraordinary measures to be taken in Syria. Some of the chemicals will need to be transported along the highway between Damascus and Homs, which is still contested as of December 2013. Syria has requested the international community provide armored vehicles to assist in the safe transport of the chemicals. In February 2014, Syria stated that rebels had attempted to attack two convoys transporting chemical weapons.

OPCW director-general Uzumcu called the overall timeline "doable", though one of his field experts characterized it as "Herculean". The Economist magazine commented in October 2013 that the timeline was "ambitious, to put it mildly", but acknowledged it had been "worked out in consultation with American and Russians experts with full knowledge of the OPCW's capabilities". Li Hong, secretary-general of the China Arms Control and Disarmament Association, stated that both the turbulent civil war and the financial cost of chemical weapons disposal will be a heavy burden on the Syrian government, and called it "unrealistic" to expect Syrian chemical weapons to be eliminated by 2014. Expert opinions were summarized in Foreign Policy magazine as follows: "Taking control of [Syria]'s enormous stores of [chemical] munitions would be difficult to do in the midst of a brutal civil war. Dozens of new facilities for destroying the weapons would have to be built from scratch or brought into the country from the U.S., and completing the job would potentially take a decade or more."

In October 2013, Amy Smithson of the Center for Nonproliferation Studies stated that the government appeared to be cooperating, but cautioned that the Syrian government had a "very sorry track record" on working with nuclear inspectors and that it is easier to hide chemical weapons than a nuclear program. Chemical weapons expert Gwyn Winfield wrote that Syria had an incentive to hold onto some of its chemical weapons, since its original incentive for developing a chemical weapons capability, as a deterrent against a suspected Israeli nuclear weapons arsenal, "isn't going to go away". In contrast, Ralf Trapp, a former OPCW official, has expressed optimism that satellite surveillance would deter cheating. Under the disarmament resolution, Syria is required to allow inspection of any site that raises suspicions.

A disagreement arose regarding the number of chemical weapons sites in contested areas of Syria, with the Syrian foreign minister stating that one-third of sites are in such areas. FSA official Louay Miqdad stated in early October that there were no chemical weapons in areas occupied by opposition forces, "which is something that the Assad regime itself acknowledges, while these storehouses are also not located on the front, so why should we stop fighting?" According to the OPCW chief, one abandoned site is in rebel-held territory, and routes to others lead through rebel-held territory. Malik Ellahi of the OPCW states that few of the locations inspectors must visit will be difficult to access.

In April 2014, disarmament experts such as Ralf Trapp characterized the pace of the operation as impressively quick. With 92.5% of the arsenal removed or destroyed, Trapp noted that many people had not expected such speed to be achievable given the ongoing civil war.

=== Later activity ===
In late October 2013, the OPCW said it expected the 1 November deadline for destruction of CW production, mixing, and munition-filling capability to be met. It was reported on 23 October that it had visited 18 of 23 declared sites. It was reported that "'low tech, quick and cheap' methods were being used, such as filling equipment with concrete, smashing it, sometimes using heavy vehicles". The OPCW "said the Syrian government had provided complete co-operation with the 27 weapons inspectors in the country".

On 31 October, the OPCW announced that Syria had met the deadline for destroying all declared equipment and facilities related to chemical weapons production, having visited 21 out of 23 sites. The two other sites were too dangerous to inspect due to being in contested areas of the ongoing civil war, but OPCW inspectors received assurances from the Syrian government that the two sites had been abandoned and emptied of chemicals and equipment, which were dispersed to other sites which had been inspected by the OPCW. A statement from the OPCW read: "The OPCW is satisfied it has verified, and seen destroyed, all declared critical production, mixing, filling equipment from all 23 sites." By early November the search of disclosed sites was nearly over. On 7 November, the OPCW said that one of the two unvisited sites had been officially verified as "dismantled and abandoned", based in part on images that the Syrian government shot using a "tamperproof" GPS-enabled camera provided by the OPCW. Later, in January 2014, U.S. Ambassador Robert Mikulak worried that the October destruction was incomplete and "reversible" and claimed that it did not, in fact, meet requirements.

On 15 November, the OPCW approved a plan to transport Syria's chemical weapons to a location outside its territory by 5 February 2014, where the weapons would then be destroyed. Acceptance of shipments of the 1,000 tons of chemical agents for destruction have been refused by most countries approached by the OPCW. As of November 2013, Belgium and France were still considering whether to agree to such shipments.

Norway and Denmark agreed to transport the chemical weapons from Syria to Italy where they were to be handed over to a United States Navy ship for destruction in international waters. The Norwegian Fridtjof Nansen-class frigate Helge Ingstad will take part in the operation, as will the Norwegian marine corps unit Kystjegerkommandoen. The Norwegian government hired in the Norwegian registered RoRo cargo ship MV Taiko for the mission. Denmark will participate with the Danish frigate HDMS Esbern Snare and the Danish government has hired in the civilian cargo ship Ark Futura for the mission.

The United States destroyed the highest-priority chemicals, which were scheduled for removal from Syria by 31 December, on board the MV Cape Ray in international waters of the Mediterranean, using a U.S. Army Field Deployable Hydrolysis System. The United Kingdom gave the United States £2.5 million of specialist equipment and training to enable the highest-priority chemicals to be processed more quickly. In addition around 150 tonnes of priority two chemicals, toxic material similar to industrial chemical agents, were transported to the UK with the help of the British Royal Navy and destroyed there. The remaining stock of priority two chemicals not going to Britain were destroyed by commercial companies.

The first shipment of components for chemical weapons were removed from Syria by a Norwegian/Danish flotilla on 7 January 2014. The 31 December deadline for complete removal of priority chemicals had been missed; on 7 January, The New York Times assessed the delay was due to the difficulty of overland transport of chemical weapons in the middle of a civil war. A second shipment was removed around 27 January; that same day, the U.N. Secretary General, Ban Ki-moon, expressed concern over the worsening delays and assessed that Syria already has the resources required to transport the weapons promptly despite the ongoing civil war.

On 2 July, the Danish ship Ark Futura arrived in the Italian port of Gioia Tauro, carrying the chemical weapons, which were then loaded onto the U.S. ship Cape Ray. The Cape Ray was equipped with two Field Deployable Hydrolysis Systems capable of neutralizing the poisonous substances and converting them into industrial waste. On 19 July 2014, around 250 protesters gathered at the Souda base to protest the elimination of the chemical weapons in the nearby region of the Mediterranean Sea.

==== Delays ====
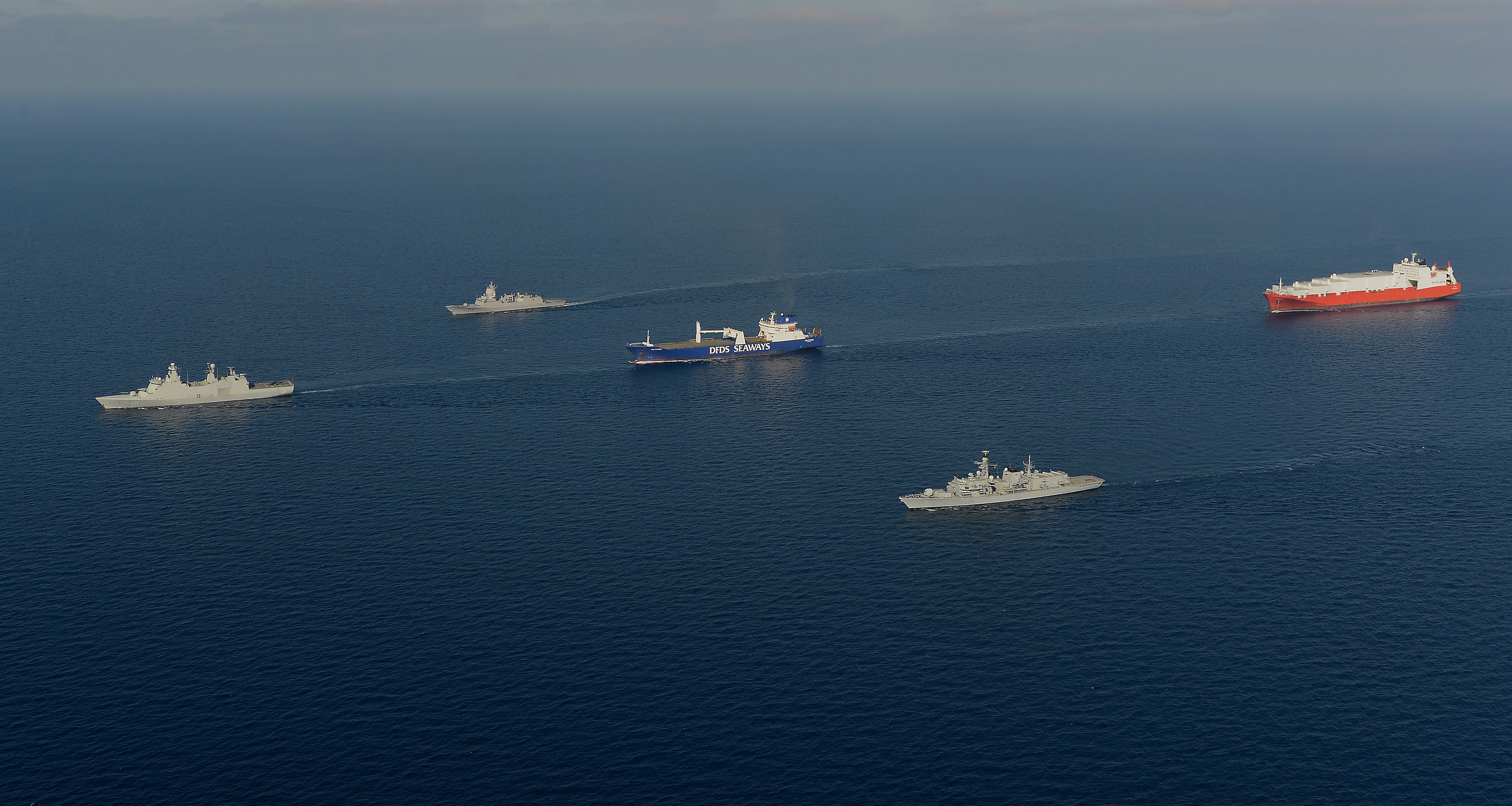
A convoy at sea in February 2014 – MV Ark Futura (blue hull, centre) and MV Taiko (red hull, far right) are escorted by KDM Esbern Snare of the Royal Danish Navy (far left), HMS Montrose of the Royal Navy (bottom), and KNM Helge Ingstad of the Royal Norwegian Navy (top)

By 30 January 2014, only about four percent of the priority chemicals had been removed. Syria continued to blame security issues; U.S. officials disagreed and accused the government of deliberately causing or prolonging the delay. On 31 January, Russian diplomat Mikhail Ulyanov responded that "the Syrians are approaching the fulfillment of their obligations seriously and in good faith". The U.S. blamed Syria's Assad government for intentionally delaying efforts to remove chemical arms from the country for destruction, suggesting that the goal of liquidating the arsenal by midyear is in jeopardy. Stating that Assad was, in effect, slow-walking the chemicals in order to obtain more security equipment, U.S. Ambassador Robert P. Mikulak said that "Syria has demanded armored jackets for shipping containers, electronic countermeasures, and detectors for improvised explosive devices." He said the demands are "without merit" and "display a 'bargaining mentality' rather than a security mentality".

Around 21 February, Syria proposed a hundred-day plan for removal of the chemicals. British official Philip Hall criticized the plan as "not adequate". At the time, the US had stated destruction of the chemicals, once off-site, would take 90 days; given that timeframe, Syria's proposed May removal deadline would not leave enough time for all munitions to be destroyed to meet the end-of-June deadline for complete destruction of Syria's chemical weapons. Around 4 March, Syria agreed to a 60-day timetable for removal of the stockpile. By 4 March 2014, almost a third of the stockpile had been removed or destroyed.

Syria missed a 15 March deadline for destroying its 12 chemical weapons production facilities. Syria proposed to instead render the facilities inoperable by sealing their entrances; the U.S. and its allies opposed this proposal and insisted on destruction.

By 21 March, Syria's entire supply of mustard agent had been removed. On 27 April, Syria missed its revised 60-day deadline for complete removal of its full chemical weapons arsenal. As at 23 May, Syria had removed or destroyed 92.5% of its declared chemical stockpile.

On 23 June, the head of OPCW, Ahmet Üzümcü, announced in The Hague that the last of Syria's declared chemical weapons had been shipped out of the country for destruction. The last 8% of the chemical stockpile was loaded onto ships at Latakia. The most toxic chemicals, including sarin precursors and sulphur mustard, were destroyed by 18 August aboard the US naval vessel MV Cape Ray. The remaining were destroyed in the US, UK and Finland. However, on 4 September 2014, the head of the Joint Mission reported to the UN Security Council that 96% of Syria's declared stockpile, including the most dangerous chemicals, had been destroyed and preparation were underway to destroy the remaining 12 production facilities, a task to be completed by the OPCW Fact-Finding Mission in Syria. On 4 January 2015, the OPCW stated that destruction was completed.

Despite American criticisms of the delays, the OPCW in July 2014 described Syria's cooperation as "satisfactory".

=== Problems with cargo ===
In a news article published in Norway's biggest newspaper Verdens Gang in December 2015, it was revealed that the operation had been far more dramatic than expected and reported. There were rocket attacks against Latakia while "Taiko" was docked. There were explosions and strikes around the docks and there were incidents where boats that could be intent on possible suicide attacks would come too close to the ships and had to be warned off. The commander of the Norwegian frigate requested that the moorings on the freighter "Taiko" were rigged with explosive charges every time she went to land in Syria so the lines could be remotely severed very quickly in an emergency allowing the ship to get to safer waters as soon as possible if any threat occurred. From the start, the shipments of containers that were transported to the cargo ships were in bad shape and some leaked potentially lethal material and gases. The containers were characterized by having been filled up hastily in a war zone before they were transported to the pier and handed to the Norwegian forces. When almost half of the cargo gave signs of leakage, an emergency meeting was held onboard Taiko with representatives from OPCW, UN, USA, Norway, Denmark, Syria and Finland. The Norwegian soldiers were ordered to deal with the situation. However no country would accept a docking of the ship with the material leaking on board, and Norwegian personnel and ships had to sail back to Syria and deal with such containers and in some cases move the material to different containers.

== Violations and post-Assad developments ==
The Economist reported in early October 2013 that Syria had disclosed 19 chemical weapons-related sites, whilst unnamed Western intelligence sources believed that 45 sites existed. One U.S. official said it was not clear if the discrepancy is "a deception" or merely a "difference of definition" regarding what constitutes a chemical weapons site. In Science Insider, experts stated that there was a possibility of incomplete record-keeping, citing an incident in 2002 wherein Albania discovered, in a cluster of mountain bunkers, 16 tons of primitive, undocumented chemical weapon agents that Albania had forgotten about. Chemical weapons expert Winfield has commented that the success of the destruction plan depends on Syria revealing all of its chemical arms stockpile, much of which is moveable and may be spread across dozens of sites.

Chlorine, a common industrial chemical, was allegedly used in poison-gas attacks by the Assad government in 2014. Chlorine is not on the list of prohibited chemicals covered by the disarmament agreement; however, its use as a weapon violates the Chemical Weapons Convention. Alleged chlorine attacks continued throughout the war; for example, according to the United Nations, there were at least three incidents in Syria in 2016 where chlorine was used by the regime.

In July 2014, Assad disclosed to the OPCW "a facility for the production of ricin" but stated that "the entire quantity of ricin produced was disposed of prior to the entry into force" of the Chemical Weapons Convention. The lateness of this disclosure raised doubts about the completeness of the government's declaration of its chemical weapons stockpile. The Israeli intelligence community believes the Assad government retains a "residual" chemical stockpile of somewhere between several hundred kilograms to several tons of chemical weapons, about 1% of its original stockpile.

On 4 April 2017, a chemical attack on Khan Shaykhun with a banned chemical caused around 100 deaths and around 500 injuries. The OPCW found the attack involved "sarin or a sarin-like substance". The United States and others attribute the attack to the Syrian government. The Syrian government claimed the incident was a fabrication and insisted, despite video documentation, that it was "not clear" that an attack had even happened. Russia claimed the incident was caused by Syrian bombs hitting some sort of rebel sarin cache; experts do not consider the Syrian or Russian claims credible, on multiple levels. On 7 April, the United States struck a Syrian airbase in response to the chemical attack.

On 17 August 2017, Reuters published a report detailing the extent of Syria's failure to abandon chemical weapons, citing information from investigators, inspectors, and diplomatic sources. According to a source cited in the report, "There are certainly some gaps, uncertainties, discrepancies" regarding Syria's chemical weapons arsenal. For example, the Syrian government inaccurately or even falsely declared the types, purposes, and quantities of chemicals in its possession, and is suspected of continuing to hold at least 2,000 chemical bombshells that should have been converted to conventional weapons.

On 12 January 2018, the United States called on Syria "to eliminate all chemical weapons, to dismantle fully its chemical weapons program, and to ensure that these weapons can no longer be used against the Syrian people", implying that it believes such weapons continue to exist. A chemical attack on Douma took place on 7 April 2018 that killed at least 49 civilians with scores injured, and which has been blamed on the Assad government. The blaming of the Assad government for the attack is another indication of the belief that Syria still has chemical weapons.

On 19 April 2018, it was reported that between 2014 and 2016 three Belgian companies, in alleged violations of EU sanctions, imposed in 2013, barring the sale of illegal chemical to the Syrian regime, exported chemicals to Syria, including 96 tonnes of isopropanol, a chemical from which sarin nerve gas can be produced. French and German companies have also allegedly sold material to Iran that later turned up in Iranian chemical rockets in Syria.

In March 2023, UN Security Council declared Syria's chemical weapons declaration "incomplete" with the UN Disarmament Chief stating that Syrian claims "cannot be considered accurate" and violated the Chemical Weapons Convention. United States, UAE, Malta, Switzerland, France, UK and various other countries criticized Syria of disregarding the Chemical Weapons Convention; and urged to take steps to pressurize Syria into co-operating with OPCW.

Two months later in May 2023, UN Disarmament Chief reiterated before the Security Council that Syrian declarations were blatantly false and stated that the Assad government was working to undermine the OPCW investigations and fact-finding missions. United States, France, UK, Turkey, Japan, Switzerland and other members demanded Assad government's disclosure of all its chemical weapons stockpiles; in addition to its full co-operation with OPCW teams.

Following the fall of the Assad regime on 8 December 2024, Syria's new authorities began efforts to locate and destroy remnants of the former chemical weapons program. In May 2026, more than 70 previously undeclared chemical munitions were discovered, along with raw materials linked to the production of sarin.

On 3 September 2026, the OPCW reported that it had verified the irreversible destruction of 42 aerial bombs, marking the first verified destruction of Syrian chemical munitions since 2014.

== See also ==
- 2017 Khan Shaykhun chemical attack
- International reactions to the 2013 Ghouta attacks
- Syria and weapons of mass destruction
