= HMS Diamond (D34) =

2011 Type 45 or Daring-class air-defence destroyer of the Royal Navy

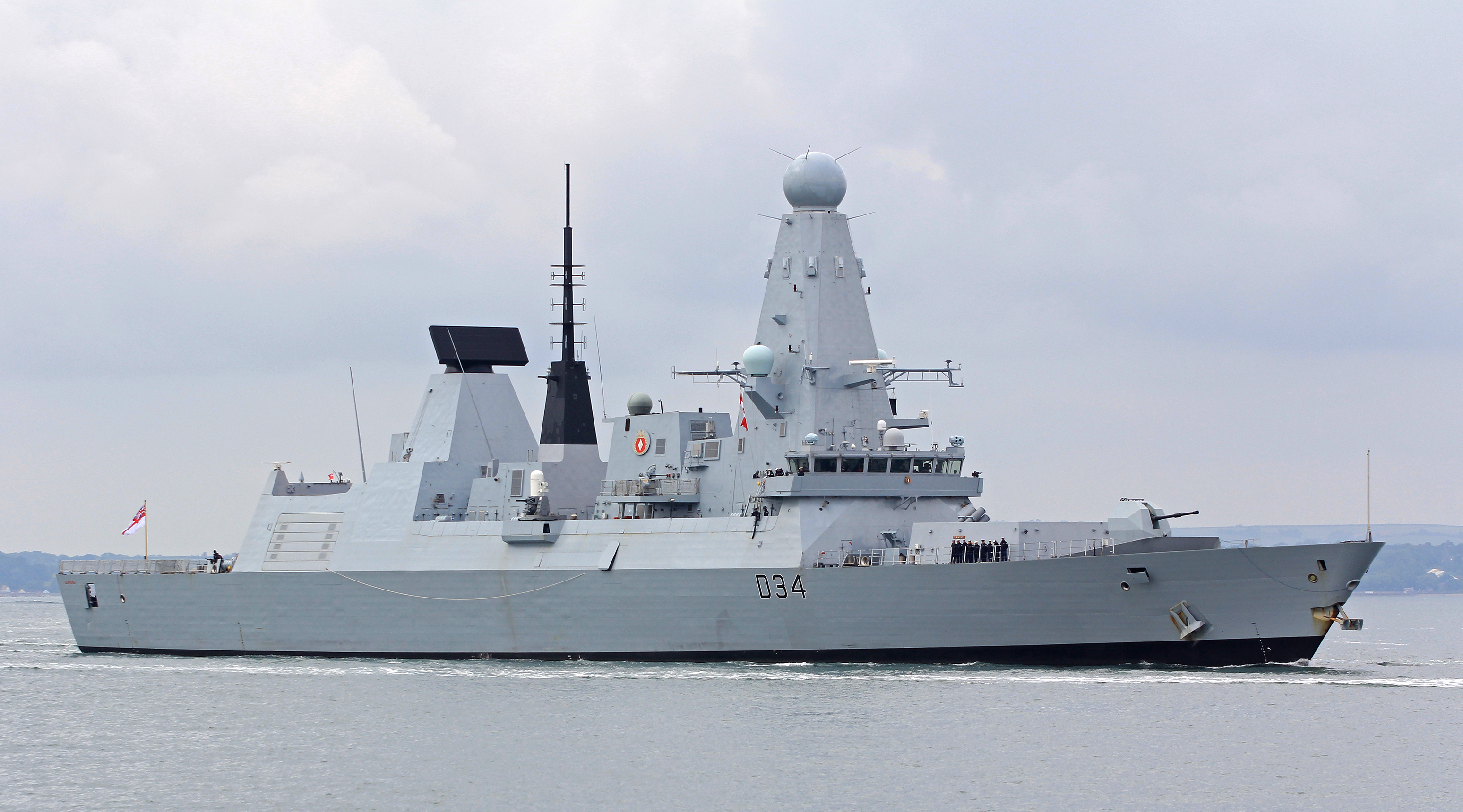
- HMS Diamond in 2016

History

United Kingdom
- Name: HMS Diamond
- Ordered: 20 December 2000
- Builder: BAE Systems Surface Fleet Solutions, Govan, Scotland
- Yard number: 1063
- Laid down: 25 February 2005
- Launched: 27 November 2007
- Sponsored by: Lady Johns
- Commissioned: 6 May 2011
- Identification: Deck code: DM; Pennant number: D34; International call sign: GPLC; IMO number: 4907763
- Motto: Honor clarissima gemma; ("Honour is the brightest jewel")
- Nickname(s): "The Jewel in the Naval Crown"
- Status: To undergo Refit
- Badge

General characteristics
- Class & type: Type 45 Guided missile destroyer
- Displacement: 8,000 to 8,500 t (8,400 long tons; 9,400 short tons)
- Length: 152.4 m (500 ft 0 in)
- Beam: 21.2 m (69 ft 7 in)
- Draught: 7.4 m (24 ft 3 in)
- Installed power: 2 × Rolls-Royce WR-21 gas turbines, 21.5 MW (28,800 shp) each; 2 × Wärtsilä 12V200 diesel generators, 2 MW (2,700 shp) each
- Propulsion: 2 shafts integrated electric propulsion with; 2 × Converteam electric motors, 20 MW (27,000 shp) each
- Speed: In excess of 30 kn (56 km/h; 35 mph)
- Range: In excess of 7,000 nautical miles (13,000 km) at 18 kn (33 km/h)
- Complement: 191 (accommodation for up to 235)
- Sensors & processing systems: SAMPSON multi-function air tracking radar (Type 1045); S1850M 3-D air surveillance radar (Type 1046); Raytheon Integrated Bridge and Navigation System; 2 × Raytheon AHRS INS (MINS 2); 2 × Raytheon I-band Radar (Type 1047); 1 × Raytheon E/F-band Radar (Type 1048); Ultra Electronics Series 2500 Electro-Optical Gun Control System (EOGCS); Ultra Electronics SML Technologies radar tracking system; Ultra Electronics/EDO MFS-7000 sonar
- Electronic warfare & decoys: UAT Mod 2.0 (2.1 planned); AN/SSQ-130 Ship Signal Exploitation Equipment (SSEE) Increment F cryptologic exploitation system; Seagnat; Naval Decoy IDS300; Surface Ship Torpedo Defence
- Armament: Anti-air missiles: PAAMS air-defence system; 48 × Sylver vertical launching system A50 for: Aster 15 missiles (range 1.7–30 km); Aster 30 missiles (range 3–120 km), to be upgraded with a ballistic missile defence capability, called Sea Viper Evolution.; 24 × Sea Ceptor silos to be fitted starting on HMS Defender from 2026 for: 24 × surface-to-air missiles that will replace the Aster 15 missiles to allow all 48 × Sylver vertical launching systems to be used for Aster 30.]; Anti-ship missiles: Harpoon Block 1C SSMs, originally fit (retired 2023); to be replaced with Naval Strike Missile in due course); Guns: 1 × 4.5 inch Mark 8 naval gun; 2 × DS30B Mk 1 30 mm guns; 2 × 20 mm Phalanx CIWS; 2 × 7.62 mm Miniguns (replaced by Browning .50 caliber heavy machine guns as of 2023); 6 × 7.62 mm general purpose machine guns
- Aircraft carried: 1–2 × Lynx Wildcat, armed with: Martlet multirole missiles, or; Sea Venom anti-ship missiles (initial operating capability in October 2025; projected to achieve full operational capability in 2026) or; 2 × anti submarine torpedoes; or; 1 × Westland Merlin, armed with: 4 × anti-submarine torpedoes
- Aviation facilities: Large flight deck; Enclosed hangar

HMS Diamond is the third ship of the Type 45 or Daring-class air-defence guided missile destroyers built for the Royal Navy. She was launched in 2007, and completed her contractor's sea trials and arrived at her base port in 2010. Diamond formally entered service in 2011.

It is equipped with a SAMPSON active electronically scanned array multi-function radar system that allows the Diamond to track 2,000 threats from over 250 miles away, a Sea Viper missile system that can launch eight missiles in under 10 seconds and can guide up to 16 missiles simultaneously, a Wildcat HMA2 helicopter with Martlet air-to-surface missiles, and a 4.5-inch Mark 8 naval gun.

In December 2023, Diamond shot down a suspected attack drone launched from a Houthi-controlled area of Yemen, with a Sea Viper missile, in what the UK Ministry of Defence said was the first time in decades that the Royal Navy had shot an aerial target in anger. On 10 January 2024, the Houthis carried out a more daring attack on US and UK ships. This was a missile barrage, and all the missiles were shot down by Diamond, USS Dwight D. Eisenhower, and other naval vessels.

== Construction and sea trials ==
Diamond's construction began at the BAE Systems Naval Ships yard at Govan on the River Clyde in February 2005. She was launched on 27 November 2007.

By July 2010, Diamond had been fully fitted out and finished her contractors' sea trials (stage 1 trials). She arrived in her base port of HMNB Portsmouth on 22 September 2010.

== Operational service ==
=== 2011–19 ===
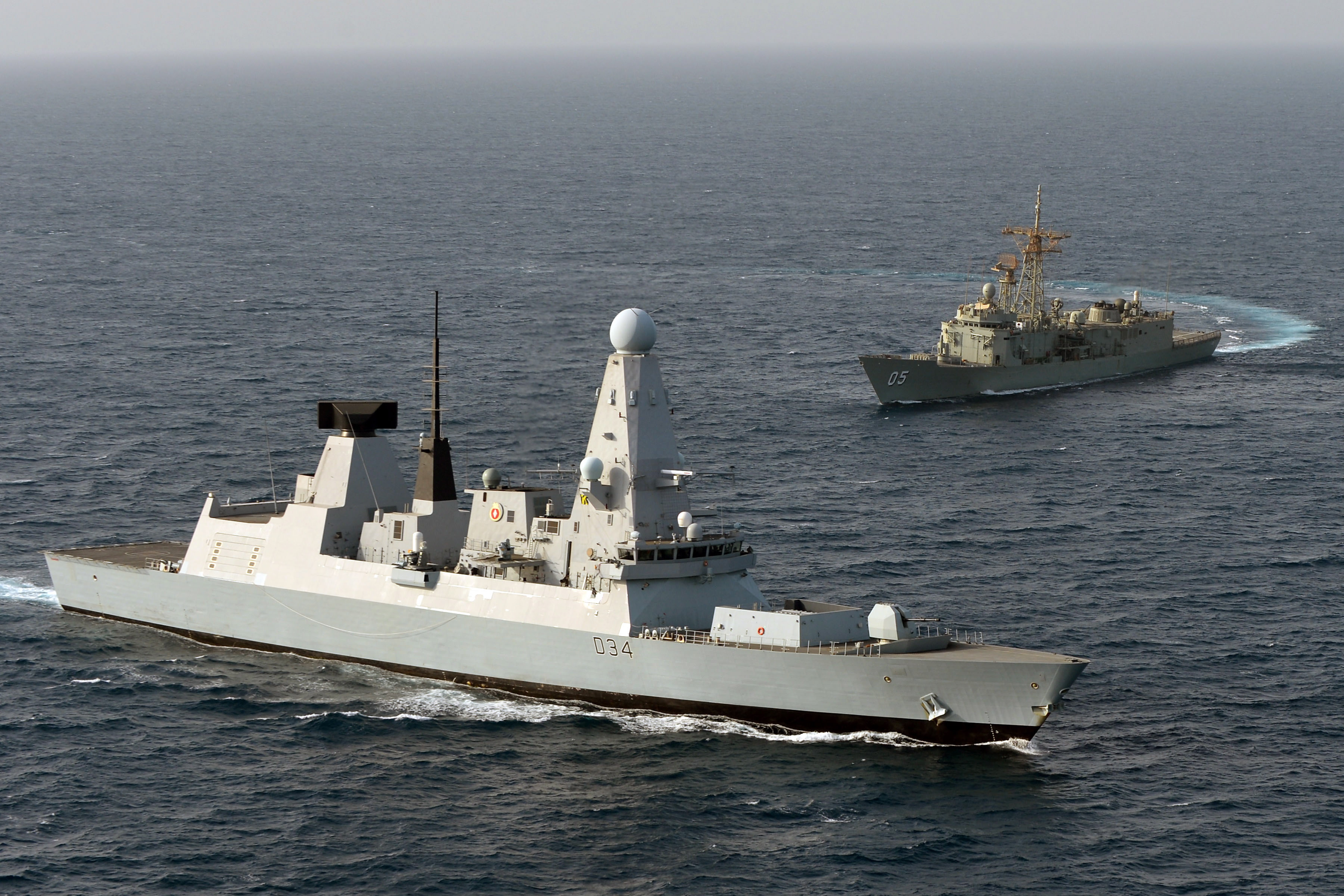
Diamond operating with HMAS Melbourne in 2012

Diamond was commissioned in a traditional ceremony on 6 May 2011 in her home port of Portsmouth. The ceremony was attended by the ship's sponsor and the Commander-in-Chief Fleet Admiral Sir Trevor Soar. Diamond continued undergoing sea trials until she entered operational service in July 2011 after the completion of her trials. The ship conducted operational training before beginning her first overseas deployment. Diamond began her deployment in the summer of 2012, starting with celebrations to mark the Diamond Jubilee of Queen Elizabeth II.

Diamond was in the Middle East Area of Operations in 2012. During Operation Recsyr in February 2014, she escorted MV Ark Futura carrying chemical agents from Syria.

On 8 May 2017, Diamond performed a demonstration firing of an Aster 30 missile off the coast of Scotland.

On 4 September 2017, Diamond sailed for a 9-month deployment to the Middle East. Initially scheduled to relieve HMS Monmouth, she was diverted to take over as the flagship of Standing NATO Maritime Group 2 from sister-ship HMS Duncan when her intended relief, HMS Ocean was redeployed to provide relief to British Overseas Territories in the Caribbean in the wake of Hurricane Irma.

Diamond was relieved of her NATO duties upon the return of Ocean from the Caribbean on 30 October, and resumed her planned deployment to relieve Monmouth. On 23 November, The Times reported that Diamond was being forced to abandon her deployment and return to Portsmouth early due to mechanical issues, which was later confirmed by the Ministry of Defence.

=== 2020–present ===
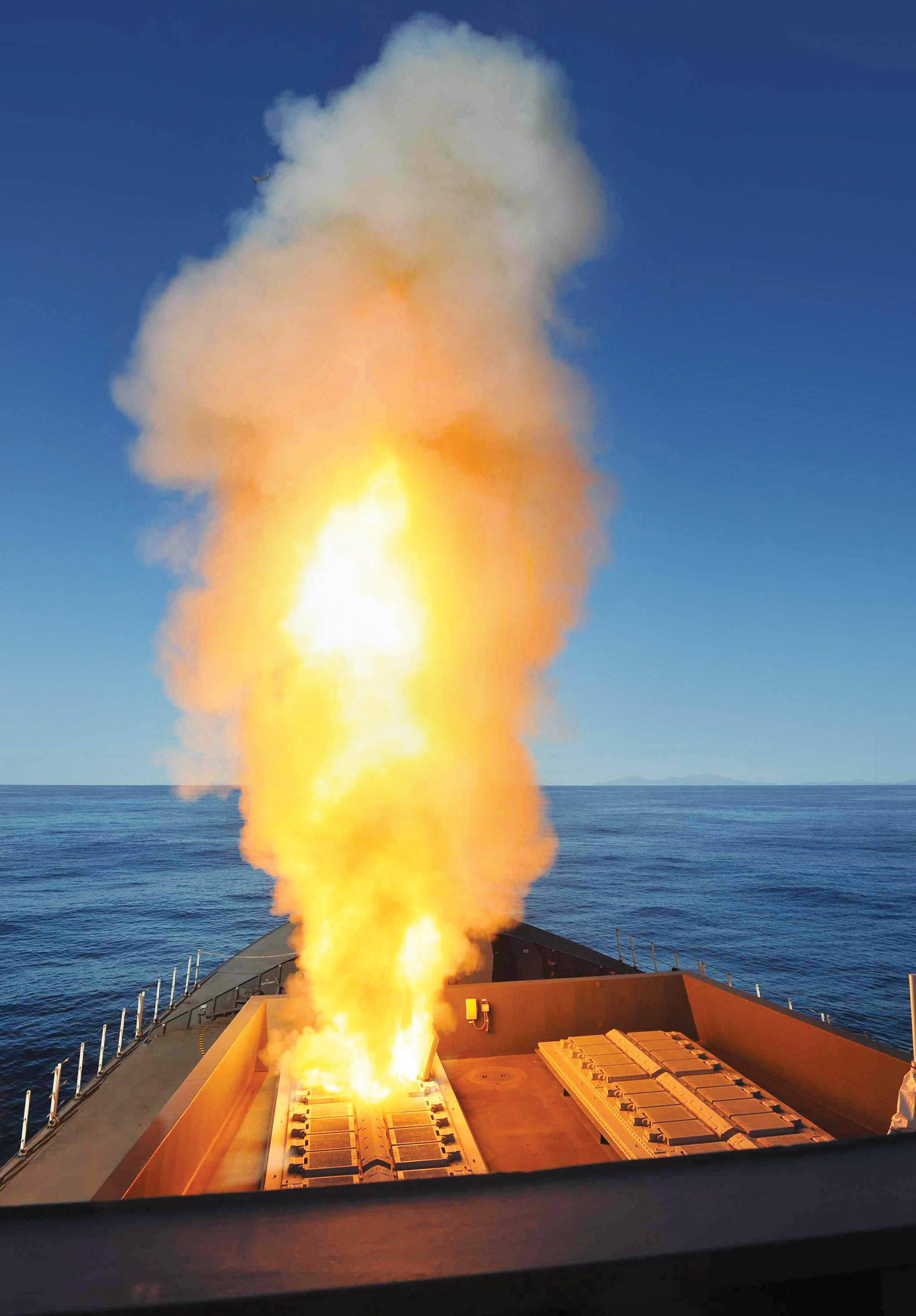
Diamond firing a Sea Viper (Aster) missile

On 10 April 2021, Diamond left Portsmouth to conduct a 41-gun salute after the death of His Royal Highness Prince Philip, the Duke of Edinburgh. The ship flew her ensign at half-mast.

In 2021, the ship initially deployed to the Far East as part of the UK carrier strike group centred on aircraft carrier HMS Queen Elizabeth. She detached from the group for repairs in July due to reported "technical issues" likely linked to longstanding power and propulsion reliability issues with ships of the class. It was later reported that the ship had "suffered a failure of one of her gas turbines". Repairs were undertaken in Taranto, Italy. At the end of August, Diamond returned to sea to rejoin the group. In mid-October 2021, after rejoining the strike group, the destroyer again experienced "technical issues", this time reportedly not related to her propulsion system and a decision was made to dock in Singapore to have them addressed.

In September 2023, Diamond, with a Wildcat HMA2 helicopter, again escorted Queen Elizabeth for her "Operation Firedrake" deployment in northern European waters. In November, the destroyer deployed to the Persian Gulf to reinforce HMS Lancaster, the Royal Navy's guardship in the region.

On the night of 15 December 2023, Diamond shot down a suspected attack drone launched from a Islamist Houthi-controlled area of Yemen, targeting commercial shipping in the Red Sea, with a Sea Viper (Aster) missile. The UK Ministry of Defence said it was the first time in decades that the Royal Navy had shot an aerial target in anger. The Houthis declared themselves part of the "axis of resistance" of Iran-affiliated groups. The Houthis, backed by Iran, intensified their attacks in the area, targeting both commercial vessels and military ships, including those from the United Kingdom. In the aftermath of the shoot down and a spate of attacks by Houthi militia on civilian vessels Diamond was assigned to join the international task force protecting ships that travel through the Red Sea. On 9 January 2024, Diamond repelled the largest Houthi drone attack to date, alongside US Navy ships. Diamond was targeted in the attacks but successfully repelled them using Sea Viper missiles and gunfire. This attack, along with prior attacks on commercial shipping, led to the 2024 missile strikes against Yemen in response. On 10 February 2024, Diamond arrived in Gibraltar for a period of maintenance and resupply after being relieved by HMS Richmond in the Red Sea. She was adorned with kill markings for nine Houthi drones which she had shot down across three engagements.

After resupply HMS Diamond then returned to the Red Sea, including providing escort to the ships of Littoral Response Group South as they deployed to the Indian Ocean. She then resumed her role in protection of merchant shipping in the region. On 24 April 2024, Diamond defended the American container ship MV Maersk Yorktown and shot down a Houthi anti-ship ballistic missile. This was the first ballistic missile kill for the Sea Viper air defence system and the first Royal Navy missile-to-missile interception in combat since the Gulf War. In May 2024, it was announced that HMS Diamond was to be relieved in theatre by her sister ship HMS Duncan.

On 9 June 2024, the Ministry of Defence denied that a ballistic missile was launched at the ship in June, as claimed by Houthis.

The Ministry of Defence has confirmed that it is considering medallic recognition for the crew of HMS Diamond for their service between November 2023 and July 2024, a period that saw the destroyer engage in multiple live combat operations in the Red Sea. In Autumn 2025, the ship was awarded a Navy Meritorious Unit Commendation by the United States in recognition of the crew's service in the Red Sea in 2023 and 2024.

== Characteristics ==
Diamond is primarily designed for anti-air warfare, able to defend against targets such as fighter aircraft, drones, and highly maneuverable sea-skimming anti-ship missiles travelling at supersonic speeds.

The ship's SAMPSON active electronically scanned array multi-function radar system allows the Diamond to track threats from over 250 miles away, and to guide friendly missiles. It can track over 2,000 targets and simultaneously control and coordinate multiple missiles in the air at once, allowing a large number of tracks to be intercepted and destroyed at any given time. The US Naval War College has suggested that the SAMPSON radar is capable of tracking 1,000 objects the size of a cricket ball travelling at three times the speed of sound (Mach 3), emphasising the system's capabilities against high-performance stealth targets. This makes it particularly difficult to swamp the system during a saturation attack, even if the attacking elements are supersonic.

The ship's Sea Viper missile system can launch eight missiles in under 10 seconds, and can guide up to 16 missiles simultaneously. MBDA describes Aster as a "hit-to-kill" anti-missile missile capable of intercepting all types of high-performance air threats at a maximum range of 120 km. The Aster missile is autonomously guided and equipped with an active RF seeker enabling it to cope with "saturated attacks" thanks to a "multiple engagement capability" and a "high rate of fire".

Diamond also carries a Wildcat helicopter with Martlet air-to-surface missiles. It is armed with a 4.5-inch Mark 8 naval gun, as well as sophisticated electronics.

== Affiliations ==
=== Ship's sponsor ===
- Lady Johns, wife of Vice Admiral Sir Adrian Johns KCB, CBE RN

=== Official affiliations ===
- Aberdeen City Council
- City of Coventry
- The County of Oxfordshire
- The Worshipful Company of Barbers
- The Worshipful Company of Makers of Playing Cards
- No. 3 Squadron RAF
- De Beers (UK)
- Loughborough Grammar School Naval Section CCF (Combined Cadet Force)
- Haberdashers' Aske's Boys School Naval Section CCF (Combined Cadet Force)

=== Other ===
As part of her affiliation with Coventry, Diamond carries a cross of nails created from the remains of Coventry Cathedral. At the end of the Second World War a cross of nails was created out of the wreckage and has been presented to all ships that carry the name Coventry. It was recovered from the wreck of HMS Coventry by divers after she was sunk in the Falklands War. and presented to the crew of Diamond on her commissioning by Captain David Hart-Dyke, the commanding officer of Coventry at the time of her sinking.

The City of Sheffield was offered affiliation to Diamond, but this was turned down by Sheffield City Council and the Lord Mayor, who want the city associated with another HMS Sheffield. The affiliation has now been transferred to the City of Coventry.
