= Field Deployable Hydrolysis System =

The Field Deployable Hydrolysis System (FDHS) is a transportable, high throughput neutralization system developed by the U.S. Army for converting chemical warfare material into compounds not usable as weapons.

== Operation ==
Neutralization is facilitated through chemical reactions involving reagents that are mixed and heated to increase destruction efficiency, which is rated at 99.9 percent.

The transportable FDHS is a self-contained system that includes power generators and a laboratory. Operational inputs include consumable materials such as water, reagents and fuel. It is designed to be set up within 10 days and is equipped with redundant critical systems. An on-site crew of 15 trained personnel, including SME support, is needed for each shift of a possible 24-hour operational cycle.

== Development ==
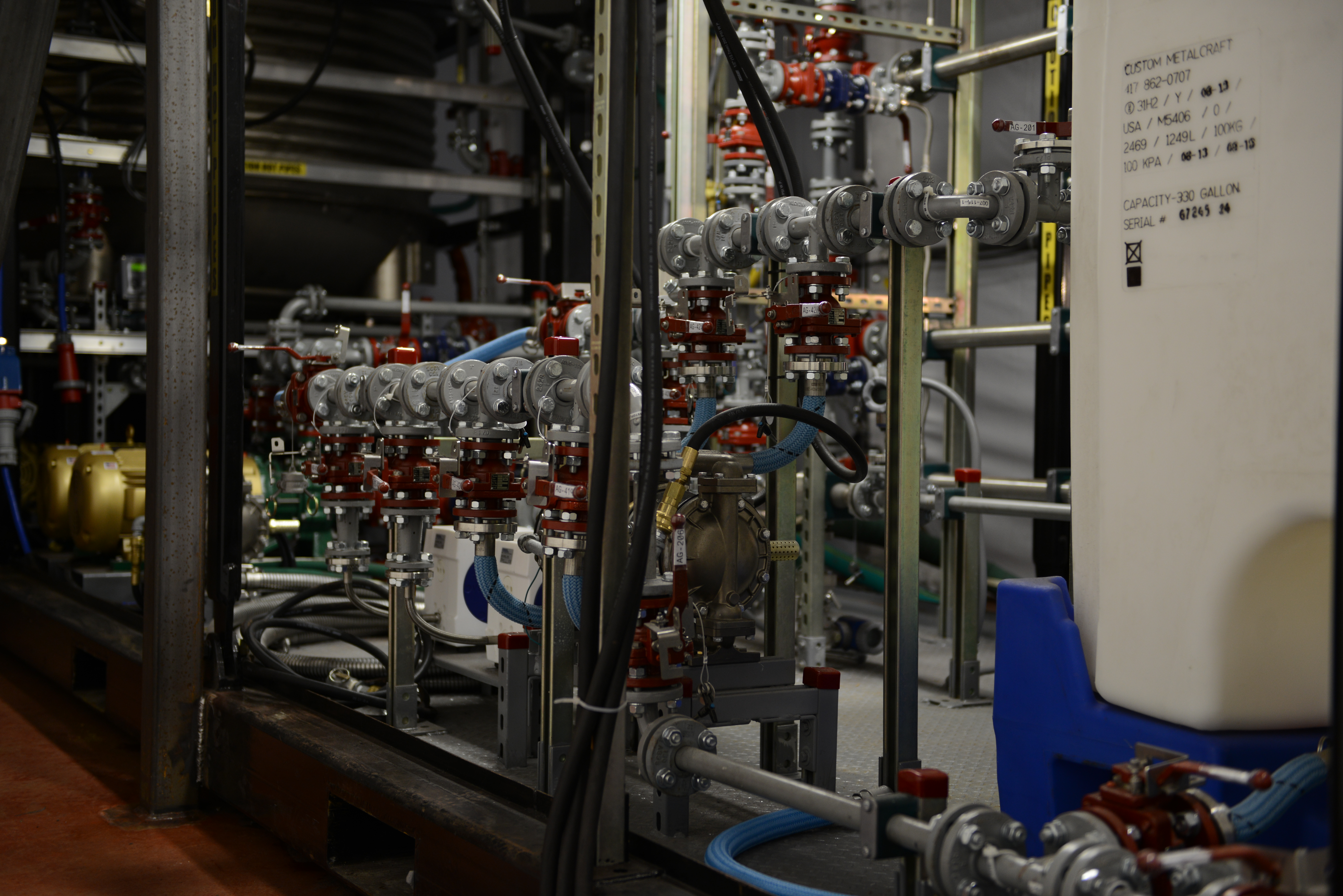
One of two Field Deployable Hydrolysis Systems installed on the MV Cape Ray (T-AKR-9679)

A 20-week design and development phase was funded by the Defense Threat Reduction Agency in February 2013. The effort to develop a functional prototype was led by subject-matter experts from the Edgewood Chemical Biological Center (ECBC) in partnership with the United States Army Chemical Materials Agency. An operational model was developed over the course of six months, with the participation of 50 ECBC employees.

== Deployment ==
Two of these units were deployed on the MV Cape Ray (T-AKR-9679) for use in the destruction of Syria's chemical weapons. They are the "centerpiece" of the disarmament effort. The United Kingdom gave the United States £2.5 million of specialist equipment and training to enable the highest-priority chemicals to be processed more quickly.
