= HDMS Esbern Snare (F342) =

Absalon-class frigate of the Royal Danish Navy

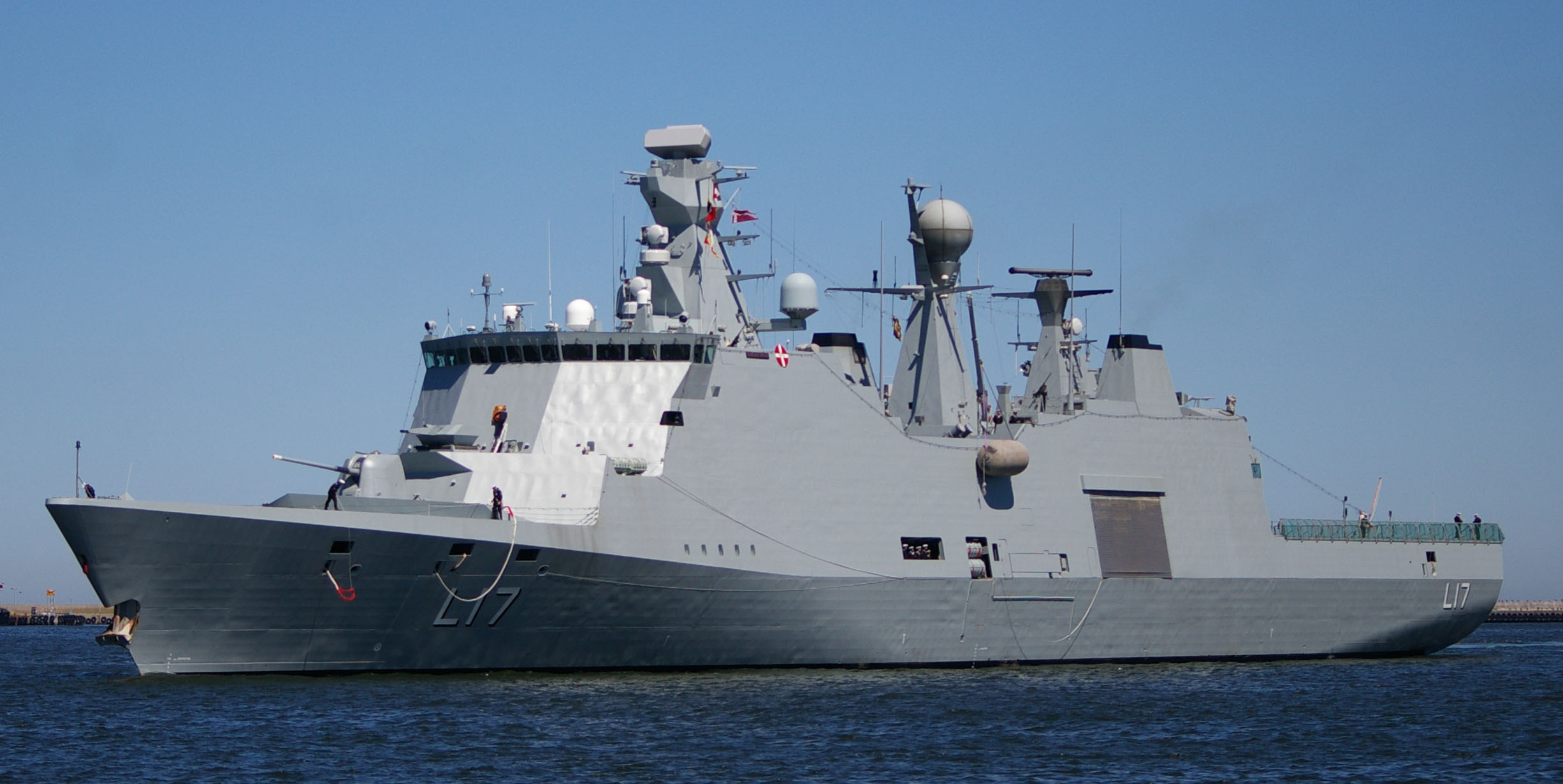
- HDMS Esbern Snare in Gdynia Harbour

History

Denmark
- Name: Esbern Snare
- Namesake: Esbern Snare
- Ordered: November 2001
- Builder: Odense Staalskibsværft
- Yard number: 192
- Laid down: June 2004
- Launched: 18 April 2005
- Commissioned: 2007
- Home port: Frederikshavn
- Identification: IMO number: 9284453; MMSI number: 220191000; Callsign: OUFB
- Status: In active service

General characteristics
- Class & type: Absalon-class Frigate
- Displacement: 6,300 tonnes
- Length: 137.6 m (451 ft 5 in)
- Beam: 19.5 m (64 ft 0 in)
- Draft: 6.3 m (20 ft 8 in)
- Propulsion: 2 × MTU 8000 M70 diesel engines; Two shafts; 22,300 bhp (16.4 MW)
- Speed: >24 kn (44 km/h)
- Range: 9,000 nmi (17,000 km) at 15 kn (28 km/h)
- Boats & landing craft carried: 2 × SB90E LCP; 2 × RHIBs
- Complement: 169
- Sensors & processing systems: Thales SMART-S Mk2 3D volume search radar; Terma C-Flex Command & Control C4I System; Terma Scanter 6002 surface search and helo radar; Atlas ASO 94 sonar; 4 Saab CEROS 200 fire control radars; ES-3701 Tactical Radar Electronic Support Measures (ESM)
- Electronic warfare & decoys: 4 × 12-barrelled Terma DL-12T 130 mm decoy launchers; 2 × 6-barrelled Terma DL-6T 130 mm decoy launchers; Seagnat Mark 36 SRBOC
- Armament: 1 × 5 inch (127 mm)/54 Mark 45 mod 4 gun; 7 × 12.7 mm Heavy machine gun; VLS with up to 36 cells RIM-162 ESSM/RIM-7 Sea Sparrow (Mk 56/Mk 48 VLS); 8 × Harpoon Block II SSM; Later: 2 × Oerlikon Millennium 35 mm Naval Revolver Gun Systems CIWS; MU90 Impact ASW torpedoes; 4 × Stinger Point-defence SAM
- Aircraft carried: 2 × EH-101
- Aviation facilities: Aft helicopter deck and hangars

HDMS Esbern Snare (F342) is an Absalon-class frigate and is, along with her sister ship, the HDMS Absalon, amongst the largest combat vessels currently commissioned in the Royal Danish Navy.

Esbern Snare is part of the first stage of a strategic realignment within the Royal Danish Navy, which is transitioning to focus on international operations, of which Absalon-class vessels will form the backbone. The ship is designed for command, support and anti-submarine roles, with a large ro-ro deck, and is complemented by the Iver Huitfeldt-class frigates.

== Operations ==
=== Somali anti-piracy operations ===
In January 2011, Esbern Snare was involved in the Beluga Nomination Incident, when she and a Seychelles Coast Guard patrol boat engaged in a rescue operation of MV Beluga Nomination and its crew, which had sent out a distress call after being attacked by Somali pirates. The Seychellois attempted to board the pirate-captured HDMS Beluga Nomination, but were repelled, during which some pirates were killed. In the confusion, two hostages managed to escape in a life boat and were later discovered and rescued by Esbern Snare, whereas two others hostages were confirmed killed by the pirates and a further two either drowned or were also killed by the pirates. When it was realized that the rescue and boarding had failed, the operation was stopped. MV Beluga Nomination and the remaining crew were released several months later by the pirates after a ransom had been paid by the owner.

On 12 February 2011, Esbern Snare captured a mother ship with sixteen pirates and their weapons, as well as freeing two hostages held by the pirates. Nobody was injured during the operation.

While patrolling on 12 May 2011, she encountered the pirated dhow NN Iran. Four pirates were killed and four were wounded in a firefight with the Danish naval force. Sixteen Iranian hostages were rescued and 24 pirates captured, but the dhow was in a sinking condition and had to be abandoned.

=== Transport of Syrian chemical weapons for destruction ===
In December 2013, HDMS Esbern Snare and the Norwegian frigate HNoMS Helge Ingstad were sent to the Syrian port of Latakia to escort the Norwegian-registered RoRo cargo ship MV Taiko and the Danish RoRo cargo ship MV Ark Futura. The cargo ships were scheduled to transport Syrian chemical weapons to Italy, where the weapons were to be handed over to a United States Navy ship for destruction in international waters.

=== Gulf of Guinea anti pirate operations ===
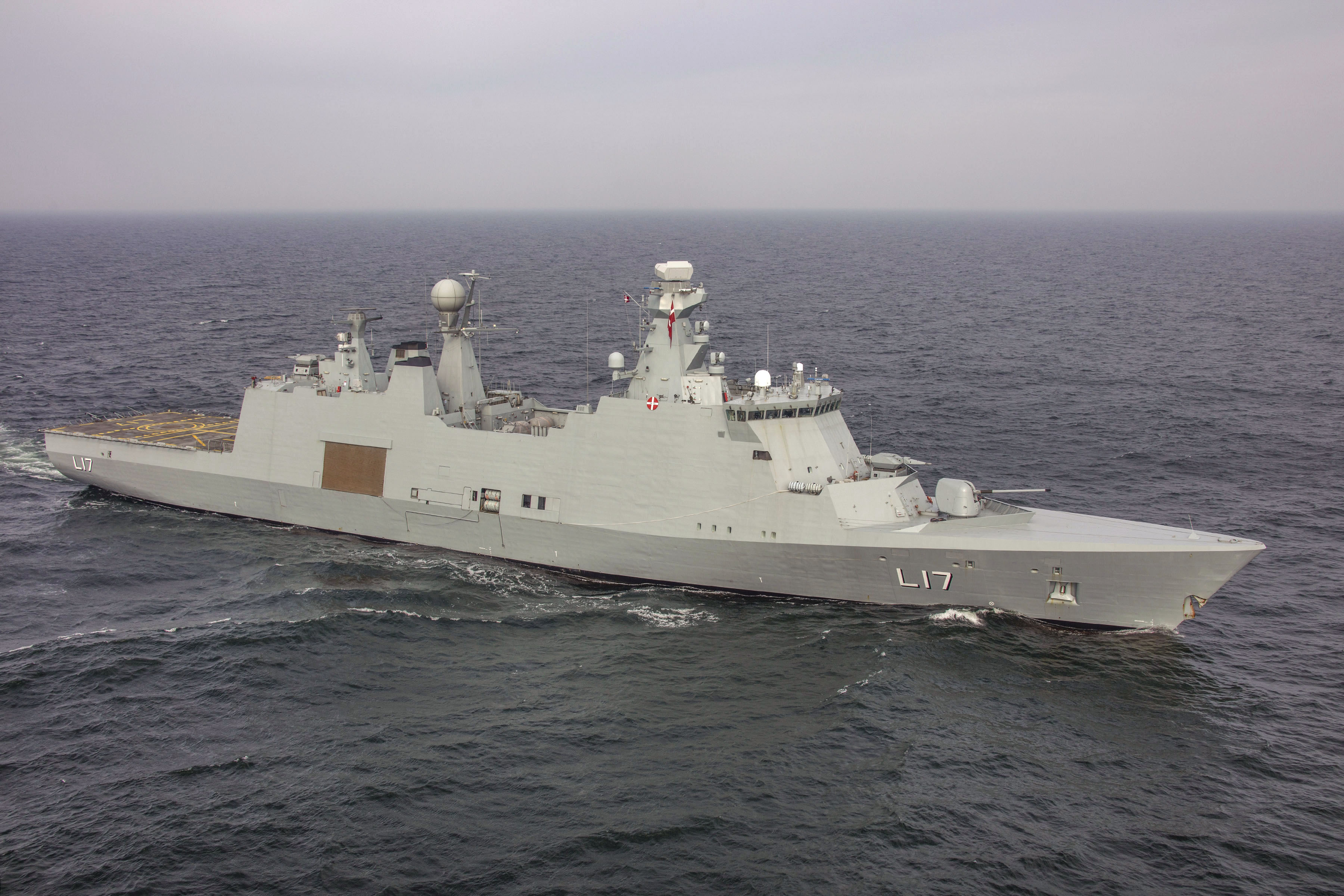
HDMS Esbern Snare during BALTOPS 20

On 25 May 2021, the Danish Parliament approved plans to send HDMS Esbern Snare to boost maritime security in one of the world's top piracy hotspots - the Gulf of Guinea. The warship deployed to the Gulf of Guinea and began patrolling 6 November 2021.

On 25 November 2021, the MH-60 Seahawk helicopter operating from the frigate detected a fast-moving skiff that was heading towards several merchant ships in international waters south of Nigeria. The skiff had eight suspected pirates aboard and was equipped with ladders, which are commonly used during piracy. The frigate called upon the suspected pirates to stop for inspection, which was ignored after which warning shots were fired. The pirates opened fire on a RHIB carrying members of the special operations Frogman Corps, who returned fire, killing four pirates and wounding one. The RHIB was hit by the pirates, but none of the Danish soldiers were wounded. The frigate provided medical treatment to the wounded individual and the remaining three were taken into custody. Following internal consultation and international negotiations, Denmark was unable to find a country willing take the captive Nigerian pirates. Three of the pirates were set free in a dinghy with food and fuel, while the wounded, named Lucky Francis, was transferred to Denmark for medical treatment and charges.

On 13 December 2021, HDMS Esbern Snare sent out warnings to several merchant ships near Bioko that a group of possible pirates were active in the area. The MH-60 Seahawk helicopter was dispatched and soon received a distress call from MV Tonsberg, a Liberian registered vessel. Upon seeing the helicopter, the pirates left MV Tonsberg in their skiff along with six hostages. Although they were within range, no shots were fired by the Danish forces as it was considered too risky due to the hostages. The pirates escaped into Nigerian territorial waters with the hostages (HDMS Esbern Snare was only authorized to operate in international waters in the region). When later boarding MV Tonsberg, a crew member that had been shot in the leg by the pirates during their take-over was discovered and transferred to HDMS Esbern Snare for treatment.

HDMS Esbern Snare was recalled home by Denmark in late February 2022 in response to the escalating Russo-Ukrainian crisis.
