= MV Taiko =

Scrapped freighter

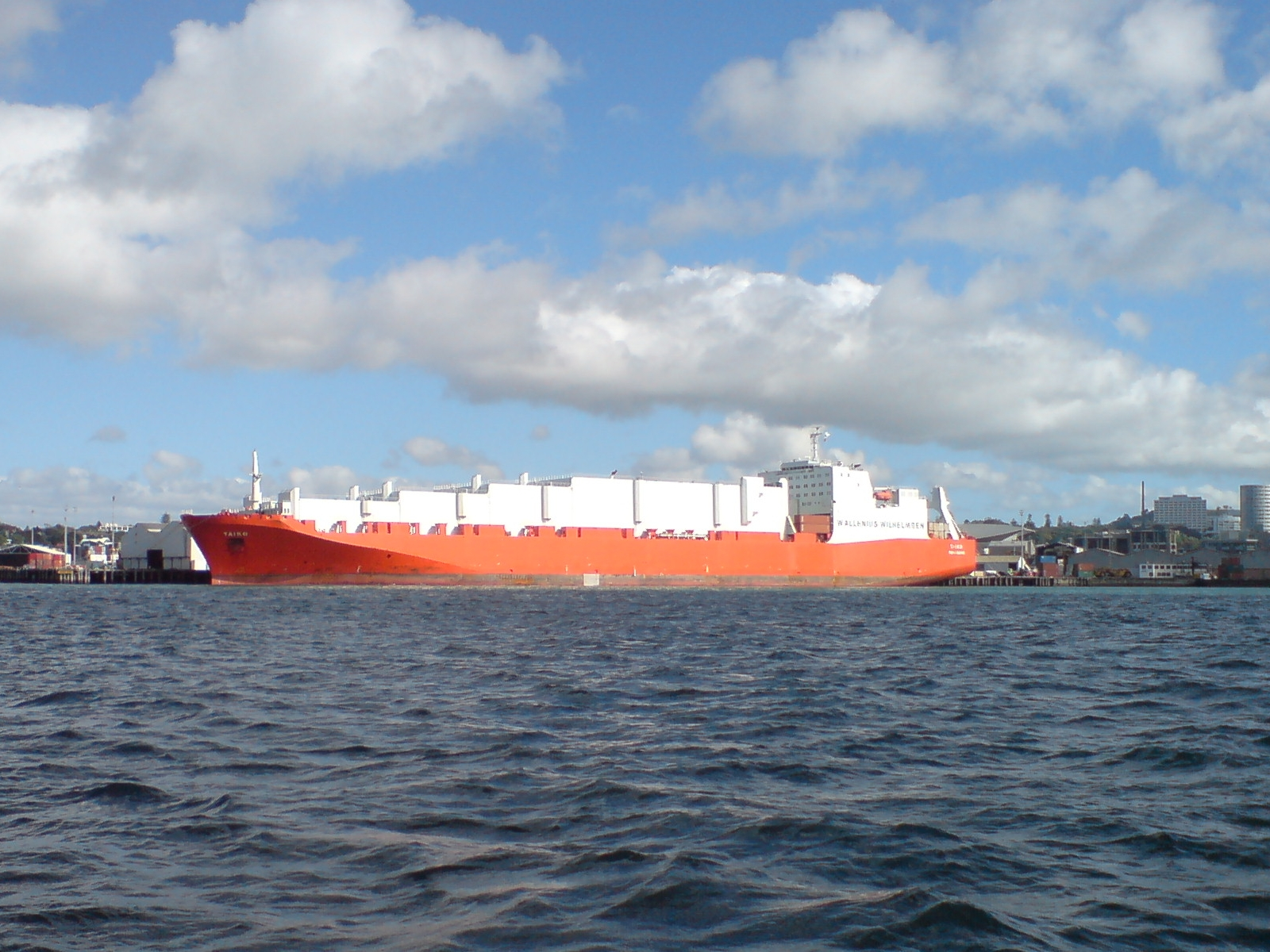
- Taiko in the Port of Auckland, New Zealand

History
- Name: 1984-1988: Barber Hector; 1988-2014: Taiko
- Owner: Wilhelmsen Lines
- Operator: Wallenius Wilhelmsen Logistics
- Port of registry: Norway
- Builder: Hyundai Heavy Industries; Ulsan, South Korea
- Yard number: 250,
- Launched: 16 November 1983
- Completed: 1984
- Identification: IMO number: 8204975
- Fate: Scrapped 21 August 2014

General characteristics
- Class & type: Ro-Ro Freighter
- Tonnage: 39,900 DWT; 66,532 GT
- Length: 262.3 m (861 ft)
- Beam: 32.26 m (105.8 ft)
- Draught: 9.78 m (32.1 ft)
- Decks: 2 hoistable decks, further RoRo vehicle decks
- Speed: 21 knots (39 km/h; 24 mph)
- Crew: 25

MV Taiko was a roll-on/roll-off (RoRo) freighter managed by the Norwegian-Swedish shipping line Wallenius Wilhelmsen Logistics. She was built as Barber Hector by Hyundai Heavy Industries at Ulsan, South Korea in 1984 for Blue Funnel Line, part of the Liverpool company Ocean Transport & Trading Ltd, and was Blue Funnel's last newbuilding. She was deployed on Barber Blue Sea Line, a joint venture between Blue Funnel, Wilh. Wilhelmsen, Oslo and the Broström Group of Sweden. In 1988 Ocean withdrew from Barber Blue Sea line and Barber Hector was sold to the Swedish partner, chartered to Wilhelmsen and renamed Taiko. Wilhelmsen purchased the vessel in 1993.

Built to carry RoRo cargoes and containers, the ship initially had a tonnage of 27,990 GT. In 2008 Taiko was converted to a vehicle carrier in China, resulting in an increase to 66,532 GT. In addition to its car decks, loaded and unloaded through a ramp with 400 tonnes carrying capacity (via a 6.4 m high and 12.5 m wide hatch), it has two hoistable decks.

In December 2013, Taiko was hired by the Norwegian Government to transport Syrian chemical weapons abroad for destruction, involving also the Danish cargo ship Ark Futura, under protection of the Norwegian Fridtjof Nansen-class frigate HNoMS Helge Ingstad and the Danish Absalon-class support ship HDMS Esbern Snare as well as Chinese, Russian and British warships. Specialist military personnel were also placed on board. Taiko loaded chemicals at the Syrian port of Latakia, for transport to Finland and the USA for destruction.

== See also ==
- MV Tampa (sister ship)
