= Control of cities during the Syrian civil war =

This article provides an overview of cities and towns during the Syrian civil war.

== List ==
Syria is subdivided in a hierarchical manner into 14 Governorates (or G.) and 65 Districts. For each governorate, the first city in the table is the governorate capital (and capital city of its district at the same time). The following towns are the regional capitals (administrative centers) of the districts. The last item is the rural area outside the listed towns in each governorate. Each section details a brief summary of that city or town's history during the Syrian Civil War. The population figures are given according to the 2004 official census.

Table of contents

Aleppo Governorate: Aleppo · Afrin · Atarib · Ayn al-Arab (Kobanî) · Azaz · Al-Bab · Dayr Hafir · Jarabulus · Manbij · Al-Safira · Anadan · Aqiba · Darat Izza · Kafr Safra · Khan Tuman · Khanasir · Al-Muslimiyah · Sarrin · Tell Aran · Tell Rifaat · Tell Shughayb · Urum al-Kubrah · Urum al-Sughrah · Others

Damascus & Rif Dimashq Governorates: Barzeh · Jobar · Kafr Sousa · Qaboun · Tadamon · Yarmouk camp · Other neighborhoods · Darayya · Douma · An-Nabk · Qatana · Qudsaya · Al-Qutayfah · Al-Tall · Yabrud · Al-Zabadani · Arbin · Assal al-Ward · Babbila · Beit Sahem · Beit Sawa · Deir Atiyah · Al-Hajar al-Aswad · Harasta · Jaramana · Kafr Batna · Muadamiyat al-Sham · Al-Sabinah · Sahnaya · Saidnaya · Saqba · Sayyidah Zaynab · Yalda · Zamalka · Others

Daraa Governorate: Daraa · Izra · Al-Sanamayn · Adwan · Da'el · Jasim · Khabab · Muthabin · Nawa · Al-Shaykh Saad · Others

Deir ez-Zor Governorate: Deir ez-Zor · Abu Kamal · Mayadin · Others

Hama Governorate: Hama · Masyaf · Mahardah · Salamiyah · Al-Suqaylabiyah · Kafr Nabudah · Ma'an · Qastun · Tremseh · Others

Al-Hasakah Governorate: Al-Hasakah · Al-Malikiyah · Qamishli · Qamishli border crossing · Ras al-Ayn · Al-Qahtaniya · Simalka border crossing · Others

Homs Governorate: Abbasiya · Baba Amr · Deir Baalbah · Ghouta · Jobar · Joret al-Shayyah · Karm al-Shami · Karm al-Zeitoun · Khaldiyeh · Old City · Qusour · Al-Waer · Other neighborhoods · Al-Mukharram · Palmyra · Al-Qusayr · Al-Rastan · Taldou · Talkalakh · Abil · Al-Buwaydah al-Sharqiyah · Al-Husn · Others

Idlib Governorate: Idlib · Arihah · Harem · Jisr al-Shughur · Maarrat al-Nu'man · Azmarin · Bab al-Hawa border crossing · Binnish · Al-Dana · Darkush · Kafr Nabl · Khan Shaykhun · Maarrat Misrin · Saraqib · Sarmin · Taftanaz · Others

Latakia Governorate: Latakia · Al-Haffah · Harasta · Jableh · Qardaha · Kesab · Others

Quneitra Governorate: Quneitra

Raqqa Governorate: Raqqa · Tell Abyad · Tabqa · Others

As-Suwayda Governorate: As-Suwayda · Salkhad · Shahba · Others

Tartus Governorate: Tartus · Baniyas · Duraykish · Safita · Al-Shaykh Badr · Others

See also · References

== Aleppo Governorate ==
Name	Population	District	Held by
Aleppo	1,800,000	Mount Simeon District		See Aleppo (Syrian Civil War).
Afrin	36,562	Afrin District		See Afrin (Syrian Civil War).
Atarib	10,657	Atarib District		See Atarib (Syrian Civil War).
Ayn al-Arab (Kobanî)	45,000	Ayn Al-Arab District		See Kobanî (Syrian Civil War).
Azaz	31,623	A'zaz District		Azaz is a passage point to Turkey. On 19 July 2012, the FSA chased out the Syrian Army from the city of Azaz and took complete control of it. FSA also took over the associated border crossing of Bab al-Salame. Samir Haj Omar, an economist who now heads the local 30-member political council, said Turkish officials have been more willing to deal with him and other rebel leaders now that they are de facto governors. In early August 2012, the first new shipments of rice, flour and gasoline arrived in rebel-controlled northern Syria, according to local officials there. Earlier in the conflict, supplies were ferried across the Turkish border by horse, or on foot, by smugglers traversing muddy trails while dodging Turkish and Syrian border guards. On 29 October 2012, France 24 reported that there was a refugee camp between Azaz and the Turkish border. On 28 February 2013, it was reported that the FSA checkpoint in Azaz was where the Free Syrian Soldiers hand in their weapons to go into the refugee camp and to Turkey. It is also the first or second checkpoint into Turkey and Syria. On 18 September 2013, the Islamic State of Iraq and the Levant seized control of the town, posting snipers on rooftops, erecting checkpoints and imposing a curfew on the local population. On 28 February 2014, FSA and Jabhat al-Akrad took control of the town and the surrounding villages. As of January 2015; Northern Storm Brigade controls the town. al-Nusra Front has a minor presence.
Al-Bab	63,069	Al Bab District		See Al-Bab (Syrian Civil War).
Dayr Hafir	18,948	Dayr Hafir District		See Dayr Hafir (Syrian Civil War).
Jarabulus	11,570	Jarabulus District		See Jarabulus (Syrian Civil War).
Manbij	99,497	Manbij District		See Manbij (Syrian Civil War).
Al-Safira	106,382	As-Safira District		See Battle of Safira.
Anadan	11,918	Mount Simeon District		At dusk on 29 July 2012, FSA commander in the area, Lieutenant Rifaat Khali, mobilized 150 fighters to seize control of the Anadan checkpoint, a strategic location linking the city of Aleppo 5 kilometres (3.1 mi) to the south with the Turkish border to the north, which the FSA used as a source for supplies. On 30 July, after ten hours of fighting, FSA seized control of Anadan checkpoint and retrieved ammunition left behind by the defeated government forces. During the fighting, eight tanks were also captured, seven of which were still operational; the operational ones were intended for use in the battle of Aleppo. At least some of the captured tanks were deployed northwards to Azaz, where they were used to support an attack on a loyalist-held airbase. Anadan has been the site of heavy shelling by the Syrian army military. On 24 October 2012, the formation of a local administration council composed from prominent engineers, doctors, human right activists, was announced. On 16 February 2020, the Syrian Army took the city.
Darat Izza	13,525	Mount Simeon District		On 23 June 2012, 25 Shabiha militias were killed by Syrian rebels in the city. They were part of a larger group kidnapped by a rebel group. The fate of the others kidnapped was unknown. Many of the corpses of the shabiha militia killed were in military uniform. A secondary school has turned into a police station, a courthouse and a temporary town hall run by the rebels. It is part of a nascent rebel administration that is taking shape in areas of the country where Assad's authority has disappeared as his security forces try to secure control of Syria's main cities: Aleppo, Damascus, Homs and others. A defector from the Assad administration, Abdul Hadi heads a "revolutionary" security force made up of some 40 officers, all of them former policemen in the government. At times, Abdul Hadi's role seems more akin to that of a local mayor than a police officer. Among his self-assigned responsibilities, he monitors local bread supplies, urging bakeries to adjust production according to need. Recent rebel attacks on a government-owned wheat silo and army gasoline depots have given them access to new supplies. On 21 November, rebels attacked the nearby Sheikh Suleiman base (which was under siege for over two months), but were repelled from the area by an army counterattack, in which 25 rebels were killed. on 10 December, the base was taken by opposition forces. A little over 100 regime troops that were left inside the base retreated to the scientific building wearing gas masks. The town was under the control of the Islamic State of Iraq and the Levant since September 2013., but then withdrew following a wide-scale offensive led by the Army of Mujahedeen and the Islamic Front.
Khan Tuman	2,781	Mount Simeon District		There is a huge collection of warehouses (about 58 of them) that extends over five kilometers in Khan Tuman. on 15 December 2012, Free Syrian Army declared their full control of the fuel, ammunition, and grain warehouses in Khan Tuman 11 km southwest of central Aleppo after clashes with the government forces. On 15 March, rebels seized control of an ammunition factory complex and munitions depots. The complex had been used to supply the Syrian army with munitions to regularly shell rebel positions in the surrounding area. On 18 August, Sohr said that Syrian troops take control over the hill of Khan Toman. On 29 January 2020, government forces captured the town.
Khanasir	2,397	Al-Safira District		On late August 2013, Ahrar al-Sham seized the town. On 1 October, Syrian Army forces launched an offensive outside the town (which is situated along a key road needed to transport essential supplies), met by Islamic State of Iraq and the Levant, Al Nusra Front, Ahrar al-Sham and other militias troops. By 10 October, Syrian government troops had seized the town. On 25 February 2016, government forces regain over control the town of Khanassir after ISIS take him during their attack on the town a few days ago. On 1 December 2024, Syrian opposition rebels have captured the city.
Al-Muslimiyah	5,916	Mount Simeon District		Since late November 2012, the Syrian Army Military Infantry College (northeast of the city of Aleppo) has been under siege by rebels from the Tawhid Brigade of the Free Syrian Army (FSA). The siege of the College is a continuation of the push from Atarib and base 46. In early December, FSA entered the College and took control progressively of all buildings On 15 December 2012, the rebels reportedly captured the infantry academy, army base and recruiting center at al-Muslimiyah, after weeks of fighting. The Hanano Barracks has a three-kilometer square campus. A top rebel commander from the Tawhid Brigade, Yusef al-Jadr ("Abu Furat"), was killed during the clashes while the pro-opposition Syrian Observatory for Human Rights stated a large number of rebels and soldiers were also slain in the battle. The rebel brigade claimed it captured 100 prisoners. During the SAA offensive in October 2014 which captured the Handarat area and placed rebel-held Aleppo under a de facto siege, Syrian Army units captured the village along with surrounding areas.
Sarrin	6,104	Ayn Al-Arab District		In May 2013, the YPG took control of this area near the Tomb of Suleyman Shah. In September 2013, the Islamic State of Iraq and the Levant and al-Nusra Front militants seized control of Sarrin. See also 2012 Syrian Kurdistan campaign. In July 2015, YPG forces took over the area.
Tell Aran	17,767	Al-Safira District		On 1 August 2013, Islamic State of Iraq and the Levant and Al Nusra Front fighters took control of the town after defeating Kurdish forces. Shortly afterwards, local Kurdish sources claimed that Kurdish civilians were killed by the jihadist groups. On 11 November 2013, Tell Aran was seized by Syrian Army troops
Tell Rifaat	20,514	A'zaz District		In the early summer of 2012, Syrian government authorities withdrew from Tell Rifaat and were replaced by a council made up of local scholars, judges, and former Syrian Army officers. On 8 August 2012, Tell Rifaat was bombed by the Syrian Air Force, resulting in the deaths of six people, all members of the Blaw family. Opposition activists based in Aleppo claimed that Syrian Army forces were attempting to cut off the FSA's transport route between Tell Rifaat and Aleppo. By November 2013, the Islamic State of Iraq and the Levant was in full control of the town. In January 2014, resistance fighters, mainly members of the Islamic Front, defeated ISIS militants in the town. Liwa al-Fatah of the Islamic Front came into control of the town. On 15 February 2016, the town was taken by the YPG-led Syrian Democratic Forces. On 12 March 2018, came under control of the Syrian army.
Tell Shughayb	5,110	Mount Simeon District		On 1 March 2013, the Syrian army regained control of the strategic Tell Shughayb town allowing them to approach the Aleppo airport.
Urum al-Kubrah	5,391	Atarib District		Since June, has control. On 22 September 2012, FSA seized Urum al-Kubrah from "pro-government militias", opening the way to lay siege to Base 46. By January 2014, the town was controlled by the Islamic State of Iraq and the Levant.
Urum al-Sughrah	637	Atarib District		Since June 2012, FSA has control. In October 2012, the military base of regiment 46 (west of town) was under siege by rebels who shelled it on a regular basis with mortar and rockets. On 18 November 2012, the base which is considered as one of the most important in north Syria, fell under rebel control, after a 55-day siege On 14 December 2012, the Administrative Affairs College (which is 17 km west of central Aleppo and 8 km east of the recently captured 46th regiment base) fell under rebel control
Outside listed towns in Aleppo G.		—		The military situation in and around the Aleppo as of 18 March 2018 Syrian Army control SDF control Opposition control In March 2012, fighting erupted for the first time in the northern Aleppo Governorate. Fighting even spilled over the border into Turkey in May, and by the end of that month, the rebels could report effective control over most of the northern Aleppo countryside. Assad's security forces lost control of almost all of the countryside north of Aleppo in late July, fleeing an offensive by rebel groups from across the rural north. Since then, local village committees that steered the uprising have shifted gears, transforming themselves into interim village governments. Rebel checkpoints dot the winding single-lane roads between the region's farming villages and towns. The countryside stretching from Aleppo to the Turkish border about 30 miles (48 km) away has been cleared of government forces. Across the scattered farm towns, locals have formed councils to remove rubble, restore utilities and funnel supplies to fighters in Aleppo. They organize security patrols to guard against thieves and government spies. Some are running prisons and rudimentary courts. On 1 January 2013, it was reported that a large majority of the Governorate was under rebel control. Between August 2016 and March 2017, Turkish and TFSA forces secured a portion of northern Aleppo governorate during Operation Euphrates Shield from YPG. Between October 2017 and April 2018, opposition forces and ISIL were defeated from southern Aleppo Governorate, leaving only northern areas under opposition control. Between January and April 2018, Kurdish forces were defeated out of the Afrin region by Turkish/TFSA forces and out of the Tel Rifat region by SAA forces during Operation Olive Branch, the remainder of which later became jointly held by SAA and SDF. Between October and November 2019, Turkish forces entered portions of the governorate briefly before retreating, while SNA seized a village, from SDF control, during Operation Peace Spring. During its course, SAA forces also moved into SDF-controlled areas, being present in Manbij and Kobane vicinities with the SDF, under reasons of protection against Turkey. Between December 2019 and March 2020, SAA forces launched the Dawn of Idlib 2 offensive, securing a large amount of HTS-controlled territory near Aleppo, leaving only a handful of villages in the governorate under HTS control. In November and early December 2024, all areas of the Aleppo Governorate controlled by the SAA were seized by the Operation Deterrence of Aggression's Military Operations Command rebel alliance and Operation Dawn of Freedom's SNA forces, except Deir Hafer and Maskanah, which were secured by the SDF. During December 2024, forces of the Operation Dawn of Freedom secured Manbij and its region from SDF control. During January 2026 after struggles in Sheikh Maqsoud between the Syrian government and SDF, the Syrian Army launched an offensive, securing the remainder of non-government (opposition)-controlled areas of the governorate; except Kobane and its vicinity, which was placed under local self-defence forces control by ceasefire terms, in agreement with the Syrian government, of which forces entered the city in the following days.

== Damascus and Rif Damashq Governorates ==
Name	Population	District	Held by	History during the Syrian Civil War
Damascus – Barzeh	47,339	Damascus District		Barzeh, a suburb of Damascus, was reported to be contested as of 7 December 2012. A truce in Barzeh was signed in January 2014. Government footage showed bulldozers clearing rubble and the local governor speaking to residents; footage from the rebels showed their fighters were still present, neither shooting nor being rounded up. The deal was voluntary; rebels were tired and wanted their destroyed town cleaned up. On 14 April, Barzeh, a suburb of Damascus, was reported to be under army control. See also: Damascus offensive.In February 2017, the Government demanded that the rebels leave Barzeh as well as the neighbouring Tishreen neighbourhood. After an intense three-month period of fighting, the rebels finally gave up and agreed to be transferred to Idlib. "See also: Qaboun offensive (2017)."
Damascus – Jobar		Damascus District
Damascus – Kafr Sousa		Damascus District
Damascus – Qaboun		Damascus District
Damascus – Tadamon	86,793	Damascus District		ln late November 2012, the west side of this neighborhood of Damascus was controlled by the Syrian Army whereas the east side was controlled by FSA after a regain in strength of the rebels in Rif Dimashq. In February 2014, it was reported that the neighborhood was under siege by the army. See also: Damascus offensive and Southern Damascus offensive (April 2018)
Damascus – Yarmouk Camp	18.000	Damascus District		The Islamic State of Iraq and the Levant (ISIL) conquest Yarmouk in April 2015. See also Yarmouk camp fighting (2015) and Southern Damascus offensive (April 2018)
Damascus	1,280,781	Damascus District		By mid-July 2012, fighting in Damascus intensified, with a major rebel push to take the city. On 19 July 2012, the Syrian Army stormed the rebel held Qaboun neighborhood with a large number of tanks. On 20 July, the Syrian Army continued its counterattack, storming the neighborhood of Jobar in Damascus, searching for rebels. The rebels confirmed they had been forced to withdraw from Al-Midan after the army assault. Rebel fighters stormed and burned the Sa'iqa military camp, which was being used as a training facility, in the Basateen al-Mezzeh neighborhood in central Damascus. The conflict reached a decisive phase in late July. Government forces managed to break the rebel offensive on Damascus by pushing out most of the opposition fighters. In November 2012, there was renewed fighting in some of the neighborhoods (Qaboun, Jobar, Qadam) after a regain in strength of the rebels in Rif Dimashq. The Mezzeh Military airport and its nearby military bases are home to the 4th Armored Division. These bases protect central Damascus from the rebel forces in Darayya and Muadamiyat al-Sham. The nearby Mazzeh 86 neighborhood is an Alawite slum and the point of origin for many pro-government militias. In 2018, all of Damascus was secured by the Syrian Arab Army. On the 8th of December 2024, opposition forces entered Damascus. See also: Rif Dimashq Governorate campaign
Darayya	78,763	Darayya District		See Darayya during Syrian Civil War.
Douma	110,893	Douma District		A battle began on 21 January 2012, after FSA fighters changed their tactics from attack and retreat guerrilla warfare in the suburbs of Damascus to an all-out assault on army and loyalist units. Earlier in January, the FSA had gained control over large portions of Douma. On 31 January 2012, the Syrian Army retakes Douma. Hundreds of troops controlled the mostly deserted streets and arrested hundreds of people. Complete control was achieved on 30 June when Syrian army troops entered all parts of Douma. On 18 October, after heavy fighting, the FSA retook control of the city. On 30 October, there were continuing fights in Douma. It was reported to be under rebel control as of 7 December 2012. On 30 December, the Syrian troops killed 30 "terrorists" from the Al Qaeda-linked Al Nusra Front and other jihadist groups during a series of "qualitative" operations in two areas of the rebel-held Douma suburb, east of the capital Damascus. On 1 February, the Observatory said that regime-versus-rebel clashes were heavy in the Damascus suburb of Douma. On 12 April 2018, the Syrian army took full control of the city Douma. On 7 December 2024, rebel forces re-entered Douma. See also: Rif Dimashq offensive (August–October 2012) and Rif Dimashq offensive (November 2012 – February 2013) and Rif Dimashq offensive (February–April 2018).
An-Nabk	32,548	Al-Nabk District		See Battle of Qalamoun (Army push into An-Nabek).
Qatana	33,996	Qatana District		See Qatana (Syrian Civil War).
Qudsaya	33,571	Qudsaya District		Qudsaya is called "The Lion's Den" because of the presence of a large number of Alawite government supporters. On 24 August 2012, government forces stormed the town amid heavy gunfire. in March 2013, it was reported that the majority Sunni suburb of Qudsaya has just two Alawite areas, but Republican guard troops were busy clearing out Sunni enclaves there throughout the summer and fall of 2012. On 9 November 2013, military sources announced an agreement had been reached in Qudsaya. The agreement establishes a ceasefire and a joint security committee from the army and the opposition militants, under the Syrian flag, which will be raised in the town square. Also as part of the agreement, the two roads leading to Qudsaya will be reopened – the old Safsaf Avenue and the road that links the city to its main suburb.
Al-Qutayfah	26,671	Al-Qutayfah District		On 5 December 2012, government forces stationed in Al-Qutayfah launched rocket shelling on neighboring areas.
Al-Tall	44,597	Al-Tall District		In July 2012, the city became an important rebel base around Damascus. When the Battle of Damascus started, the rebels stormed two government buildings and reportedly detained 40 soldiers while seizing a number of weapons. The city was also one of the places where the rebel retreated after their defeat in Damascus. At the end of July, rebels were gathering and massing in Al-Tall to ready themselves for another attack on Damascus. At the beginning of August, the Syrian Army started shelling the rebel positions more intensively. The city became completely besieged by the Army after the capture of 3 Syrian journalists by the rebels near the city. The Syrian Army took control of the city and cleared it of rebel presence 17 August, while the Syrian National Council described the area a "sinister zone". The three captured journalists were found by the Syrian Army. See also: Rif Dimashq offensive (August–October 2012).
Yabroud	25,891	Yabrud District		See Yabroud (Syrian Civil War).
Al-Zabadani	26,285	Zabadani District		See Al-Zabadani (Syrian Civil War).
Arbin	44,934	Markaz Rif Dimashq		On 2 July, FSA had taken control of a number of suburbs north of the capital Damascus, including Arbin. FSA fighters openly patrolled the streets of the suburbs, and clashes occurred less than 10 km from the center of Damascus city itself. In November 2012, there was sustained fighting in the town after a regain in strength of the rebels in Rif Dimashq. It was reported to be under rebel control as of 7 December 2012.
Assal al-Ward	5,812	Yabrud District		Since June 2012, the Syrian Army has had control of this town located along the Syrian–Lebanese borders. On 15 April 2014, the Syrian army, backed by Hezbollah fighters, retook village Aasal al-Ward. In October 2014, al-Nusra Front launched a heavy attack on al-Jebbah and Assal al-Ward.
Babbila	50,880	Markaz Rif Dimashq		ln late November 2012, this suburb has seen fighting between FSA and government troops after a regain in strength of the rebels in Rif Dimashq In February 2014, Syria's army and rebels agreed to a truce in Babbila. Regime troops raised the Syrian flag over the municipality of the southern suburb, which had been used as a rebel rear base until several months ago when the army laid siege to it. Armed rebels were still present in the area, as the terms of the agreement also included an amnesty, a security source said.
Beit Sahem	15,667	Markaz Rif Dimashq		In January 2014, the local opposition committee in the suburb proposed to the government a cease-fire with local autonomy, according to a resident of a neighboring town familiar with the talks. People there were shot as they tried to leave under an abortive deal in December, but they are hungry, and ready to try again. At the end of April 2018, rebel forces hand over their territory south of Damascus to Syrian army and evacuated.See also Southern Damascus offensive (April 2018)
Beit Sawa	6,249	Markaz Rif Dimashq		Beit Sawa and the nearby Hammurah fields, experienced intermittent shelling by Syrian Army for three days between 30 June to 2 July 2012. ln late November 2012, Beit Sawa was under FSA control after a regain in strength of the rebels in Rif Dimashq.
Al-Hajar al-Aswad	84,948	Darayya District		On 26 July 2012, fighting was reported in the Al-Hajar al-Aswad suburb of the capital, a place described as home to thousands of poor refugees from the Israeli-occupied Golan Heights who were at the forefront of the movement against Assad. The FSA had withdrawn to the southern suburb of Al-Hajar al-Aswad with the suburb being shelled by Government forces and an activist in the area said that there were still ongoing clashes in the south of the city. On 27 July 2012, the army took it back. On 30 October 2012, clashes broke out in Al-Hajar Al-Aswad between rebels and the army, spreading into the adjacent Yarmuk Palestinian camp. On 19 November, rebels seized the headquarters of an army battalion and air defense base on the edge of the suburb, making it the nearest military base to Central Damascus to fall under rebel control. In January 2014, reports indicated that opposition fighters fleeing the fallen towns are concentrated in the remaining strongholds, particularly Al-Hajar al-Aswad. On 15 May 2018, the Syrian Army and allies captured al-Hajar al-Aswad neighborhood completely. See also: Rif Dimashq offensive (August–October 2012). Rif Dimashq offensive (November 2012 – February 2013) and Southern Damascus offensive (April 2018).
Harasta	68,708	Douma District		Before the war, Harasta was home to the 104th and 105th Republican Guard regiments and has a high population of Alawites in the suburbs, although it was a site of several anti-government protests in 2011. Harasta was reported under rebel control by early 2012. In March 2012 and again on 21 October 2012 it was reported that Harasta was under heavy government shelling. On 25 October, the Syrian army fired heavy tank and rocket barrages, after rebels overran two army checkpoints on the edge of the town. On 26 October 2012, it was shelled with heavy artillery, killing at least 10. On 30 October, government airstrikes targeted Harasta. It was reported to be under regime control on 25 November 2012. In August 2013 it was reported under rebel control with government advances on key points in the town. Government control but rebel advances were reported in January 2014. Territory in Harasta changed hands repeatedly during the Rif Dimashq offensive (September 2015). It has been the site of fighting in the Battle of Harasta (2017–18) .
Kafr Batna	22,535	Markaz Rif Dimashq		On 29 January 2012, Syrian Army tanks entered this suburb of Damascus to force out FSA. Although it has not been verified, opposition activists reported that five FSA soldiers and 14 civilians, including at least one minor, were killed during the raid. on 4 February 2013, it was reported that the suburb was taken over by the rebels as part of a large push into the capital On 17 March 2018, the Syrian army managed to advance and completely control the whole town of Kafrbatna.
Muadamiyat al-Sham	52,738	Darayya District		After a two-day operation at the end of July 2012, which killed 120 people in this suburb, the Syrian Army started a new operation on 20 August. The rebels repelled the first attack but the Syrian Army quickly managed to overrun the rebels. The death toll of the operation was estimated at 86 dead, half of them executed by the Syrian Army for being suspected rebels. A car bomb exploded in the town on 31 October, injuring an unknown number of people. By this point, the town was being contested between rebels and government forces. On 30 November 2012, there was continued shelling in the suburb from 4th division headquarters and Mezzeh Military Airport. Rebels surrendered to the Syrian Arab Army on 1 September 2016 See also: Siege of Darayya and Muadamiyat.
Al-Sabinah	62,509	Markaz Rif Dimashq		On late November 2012, this suburb has seen fighting between FSA and government troops after a regain in strength of the rebels in Rif Dimashq The town was retaken by the SAA, National Defense Force and Hezbullah fighters on 7 November 2013, cutting off the main rebel supply lines into southern Damascus. On 12 March 2013, artillery shelling targeted Hujaira Balad from brigade 158 that is situated on Jabal Suhya south of Al-Sabinah. See also: Rif Dimashq offensive (August–October 2012).
Sahnaya	13,993	Darayya District		Since late November 2012, this suburb was under government control See also: Rif Dimashq offensive (August–October 2012) and Rif Dimashq offensive (November 2012–present).
Saqba	25,696	Markaz Rif Dimashq		On 27 August 2012, rebels attacked government positions in Saqba, overrunning several Army checkpoints. Following the attacks, airstrikes killed an unspecified number of people in Saqba. ln late November 2012, Saqba was under FSA control after a regain in strength of the rebels in Rif Dimashq. On 17 March 2018, the Syrian army managed to advance and completely control the whole town of Kafrbatna and the city of Saqba.See also: Rif Dimashq offensive (August–October 2012).
Yalda	28,384	Markaz Rif Dimashq		ln late November 2012, this suburb was under FSA control after a regain in strength of the rebels in Rif Dimashq. At the end of April 2018, rebel forces hand over their territory south of Damascus to the Syrian army and evacuated.See also Southern Damascus offensive (April 2018)
Zamalka	44,661	Markaz Rif Dimashq		On 2 July, FSA had taken control of a number of suburbs north of the capital Damascus, including Zamalka. FSA fighters openly patrolled the streets of the suburbs, and clashes occurred less than 10 km from the center of Damascus city itself. In November 2012, there was sustained fighting in the town after a regain in strength of the rebels in Rif Dimashq. It was reported to be under rebel control as of 7 December 2012. However, as of September 2013, the government still had a presence in the town.
Outside listed towns in Rif Dimashq G.		—		Frontlines in the Qalamoun Mountains in April 2014 Syrian Government control Opposition control Hezbollah Presence Contested Since June 2012, FSA controls rural areas between the Damascus-Homs highway and the Lebanese frontier (north of Zabadani) On 2 July, FSA had taken control of a number of suburbs north of the capital Damascus. FSA fighters openly patrolled the streets of the suburbs, and clashes occurred less than 10 km from the center of Damascus city itself. On 25 November, rebels seized control of the Marj As Sultan Military airbase in Eastern Ghouta after a battle in which two Syrian Army helicopters were shot down On 29 November, rebels stated that they had blocked access to Damascus International Airport. The Ministry of Information said that access to the airport was safe and clear of rebel activity. Emirates and EgyptAir suspended their flights to Damascus. Along the road from Damascus to the airport, there are 7 main bridges; On 2 May, government forces captured the town of Qaysa which lies to the east of Damascus in a steady push north from the city's airport. Remaining rebel forces within Rif Dimashq were defeated by the SAA in 2018. During December 2024, rebel forces took over the governorate. See also: 2011 Rif Dimashq blockades, Battle of Jdaidet al-Fadl, Battle of Qalamoun, Al-Otaiba ambush, Rif Dimashq Governorate campaign and Yarmouk camp fighting (2015).

== Daraa Governorate ==
Name	Population	District	Held by	History during the Syrian Civil War
Daraa	97,969	Daraa District		On 25 April 2011, the Syrian military launched a large operation in Daraa in a crackdown on pro-democracy protesters. The operation lasted until 5 May 2011. On 16 February 2012, the Syrian Army reportedly attacked Daraa, shelling the city heavily. This was apparently because "Daraa has been regaining its role in the uprising. Demonstrations have resumed and FSA has been providing security for protests in some parts of the city." The attack was part of a security force push "to regain control of areas they lost in recent weeks", indicating that the FSA in Daraa had taken control of parts of the city. Security forces attacked at least three districts, but FSA fighters fought back, firing at Syrian Army roadblocks and buildings housing security police and militiamen. On 14 March 2012, the FSA controlled at least one main district in the city of Daraa (Al-Balad district) which made the Syrian army attack it by firing anti-aircraft guns into buildings of the FSA-controlled district. See also: 2011–2012 Daraa Governorate clashes and 2013 Daraa offensive. A tent where around 100 supporters of President Assad had assembled to discuss an election campaign was shelled on 22 May 2014 killing at least 21 people and wounding dozens more. On 12 July 2018, the battle for the city Daraa has ended as, after several days of intense clashes between the Syrian Army and rebel forces, the last have agreed to terms of reconciliation. The city fell to the opposition on 7 December 2024. See also:2018 Southern Syria offensive and Southern Syria offensive (2024)
Izra	19,158	Izra' District		Izra is the base for the 5th division's 12th Armored Brigade and 175th Artillery Regiment; On 16 December 2012, rebels and troops clashed in the town. On 22 January 2013, it was reported that the army entered the town and started an arrest campaign.
Al-Sanamayn	26,268	Al-Sanamayn District		See Al-Sanamayn (Syrian Civil War).
Tafas	32,236	Daraa District
Muzayrib	12,640	Daraa District
Al-Yadudah	8,967	Daraa District
Adwan	2,487	Izra District		By early September 2013, the town was in control of the Syrian Army. Rebels took control of the town during their spring offensive in 2014. On 27 July 2018, the Syrian army recaptured the village of Adwan from ISIL.
Da'el	29,408	Daraa District		In March 2011, this predominantly Sunni Muslim town was among the first towns in the area of Daraa where residents participated in demonstrations against the government. On 29 March 2013 the town was reportedly captured by anti-government rebels. Da'el is strategically located on one of two main north-south highways that connect Damascus to Daraa. The rebels initially engaged in clashes with Syrian Army troops manning checkpoints outside the town, leaving 12 government soldiers and 16 rebels dead, according to the activist group Syrian Observatory for Human Rights (SOHR).
Jasim	31,683	Izra' District		Jasim was one of the first cities to participate in large-scale protests against the government on 18 March 2011. Further mass protests were reported on 22 April 2011. On 1 April 2012, four Syrian Army soldiers were killed in clashes with rebel FSA gunmen in Jasim. On 12 and 13 November 2012, fierce gunfire has been reported in the town. On 15 January 2014, rebels were in control of Jasim. On 17 July 2018, the Syrian army captured the town.
Khabab	3,379	Al-Sanamayn District		By May 2013, this predominantly Catholic town was reportedly under the control of the Syrian Army.
Muthabin	2,351	Al-Sanamayn District		By May 2013, the town was reportedly in control of the Syrian Army.
Nawa	47,066	Izra' District		In the same speech where he commented on the loss of territory in Daraa province, Syrian MP Walid al-Zouhi stated that "we are only protected from the west by Base 61," referring to the 61st Mechanized Brigade headquarters located near Nawa. On 17 July, rebels captured most of Nawa city. In early August 2013 the town was under the control of the Army. On 16 October 2013, a powerful blast ripped through a pickup truck that went past Tell_al-Jumou' (south-west of Nawa), where a battalion of troops loyal to President Bashar al-Assad was positioned. On 9 November 2014, Islamic battalions and the al-Nusra Front took over the city of Nawa, after violent clashes against regime forces. At end of July 2018, the Syrian army regain control of the city Nawa after the rebels surrender all of their territory in the Daraa province to government.
Al-Shaykh Saad	3,373	Izra District		By early September 2013, the town was under the control of the Syrian Army.
Tubna	1,272	Al-Sanamayn District		By May 2013, this predominantly Catholic town was reportedly in control of the Syrian Army.
Outside listed towns in Daraa G.		—		Since June 2012, FSA controls two areas, west and east of Daraa city (about a quarter of the governorate). by December 2012, the FSA took control of several border checkpoints stationed at the borders with Jordan On 23 March, the FSA seized full control of the largest base in Daraa, Base 38. On 25 March 2013, a Jordanian official told AFP that "The Free Syrian Army closed the two crossings of Daraa and Nasib from their side after they took control of them," The development comes after the rebels seized a 25-kilometer strip of land stretching from the Jordanian border to the Israeli Golan Heights. On 3 April 2013, rebels captured the air defense base of the 49th battalion of the Syrian Army, in the town of Alma in the northern outskirts of Daraa. On 3 May 2013, it was reported that the rebels were surrounding brigade 34 of the 9th Division At July 2018, Syrian Army controls of Daraa city and the whole of Daraa Governorate. During December 2024, opposition offensives launched by the Southern Operations Room secured control through uprisings over the entire governorate. See also: Daraa Governorate campaign, 2018 Southern Syria offensive.

== Deir ez-Zor Governorate ==
Name	Population	District	Held by	History during the Syrian Civil War
Deir ez-Zor	211,857	Deir ez-Zor District		See Deir ez-Zor (Syrian Civil War).
Abu Kamal	42,510	Abu Kamal District		See Abu Kamal (Syrian Civil War).
Mayadin	44,028	Mayadin District		See Al-Mayadin (Syrian Civil War).
Outside listed towns in Deir ez-Zor G.		—		See Deir ez-Zor Governorate (Syrian Civil War).

== Hama Governorate ==
Name	Population	District	Held by	History during the Syrian Civil War
Hama	312,994	Hama District		On 28 January 2012, 4 neighborhoods of Hama city were under opposition control. Inside Hama city, FSA under the leadership of Captain Mohammed Khalid al-Battal's al-Majed Brigade has been able to coordinate disruptive raids across the city targeting military checkpoints and security forces' outposts, but their ability to inflict casualties on loyalist troops pales in comparison to their rural counterparts. On 25 April 2013, there were fights in the Tariq Halab neighbourhood. On 5 December 2024, Hama was captured by Hayat Tahrir al-Sham. See also: Siege of Hama (2011), 27 May 2012 Hama Governorate clashes, 2012 Hama offensive and 2024 Hama offensive
Masyaf	22,508	Masyaf District		Since June 2012, the government has maintained control.
Mahardah	17,578	Mahardah District		In September 2012, the government was reported in control of the town On 17 December 2012, government positions in Mahardah were reportedly under attack by rebel forces. In the summer of 2014, Al Nusra briefly besieged the city during the 2014 Hama offensive before being beaten back. During the Operation Deterrence of Aggression, the town remained in unclear control after opposition forces reached the vicinity of Hama on 30 November 2024. After the SAA asserted its control over the city, HTS forces secured it on 5 December.
Salamiyah	66,724	Salamiyah District		See Salamiyah (Syrian Civil War).
Al-Suqaylabiyah	13,920	Al-Suqaylabiyah District		On 14 October 2012, there was fierce artillery and rocket shelling from Al-Nahel checkpoint in this Christian town, targeting the town of Kirnaz
Suran	29,100	Hama District		Jund al-Aqsa captured the town in 2016. Later, the SAA recaptured this town. On 2 December 2024, Hayat Tahrir Al-Sham and allies captured this town on the road between Aleppo and Damascus during Operation Deterrence of Aggression.
Kafr Nabudah	13,513	Al-Suqaylabiyah District		On 19 December 2012, within two days, the Syrian Observatory for Human Rights claimed that government troops had already been cleared from the small town of Kafr Nabudah. Qassem Saadeddine, a member of the rebel military command confirmed this. On 8 May 2019, the Syrian army captured the town of Kafr Naboudeh in northwest Hama.
Ma'an	1,561	Hama District		On 3 December 2024, the syrian opposition took control of three Alawite villages in the central province of Hama, among them Ma'an. On 7 October 2014, SOHR reported clashes in the vicinity of Ma'an. During the 2016 Hama offensive rebels retake control. Army recaptures Ma'an.
Qastun	6,187	Al-Suqaylabiyah District		On 29 January 2013, it was reported that FSA was in control of the town. However, The Tiger Forces of the Syrian Arab Army launched an assault of their own in the Jisr Al-Shughour District, taking control of the several villages including Qastoun, after fierce clashes with the Syrian Al-Qaeda group "Jabhat Al-Nusra" on the afternoon of Monday 27 April 2015. currently fighting is still ongoing this morning, with both sides in a deadlock for control of this town.
Tremseh	6,926	Mahardah District		The Tremseh residents are mostly Sunni Muslims. A Syrian Army convoy was ambushed by rebels near Hama, which led to a counter-attack from the Syrian Army, and reports suggested government troops were trying to take back the town from rebel forces. On 12 July 2012, Tremseh was surrounded by government tanks and artillery, after which, the Syrian military launched a full-scale attack against FSA inside the town. Tanks entered Tremseh after forces had shelled the town continuously from 5 a.m. until noon. Syrian army forces, whose numbers were bolstered by "Shabeha", accompanied the tanks into Tremseh. See also: Battle of Tremseh.
Outside listed towns in Hama G.		—		Frontlines in the Hama Governorate during the 2013 Hama offensive. Syrian Government control Opposition control Contested By June 2012, FSA controlled swathes of land in Northern Hama Governorate. FSA and local people administered justice and the distribution of supplies to residents. On 16 December 2012, the Syrian armed opposition launched the 2012 Hama offensive with the intent of taking control of Hama Governorate. Within two days, the Syrian Observatory for Human Rights claimed that government troops had already been cleared from the towns of Hasraya, and Sheikh Hadid. Rebels had advanced 40 kilometres (25 mi) south from Maarrat al-Nu'man and Jisr ash-Shugour, encountering little resistance. On 19 December, brigades of FSA claimed in videos that they had captured Kafr Zita and all area north of Hama city. It seemed that rebels had overrun the loyalist army lines north of Hama city within 48 hours On 20 December, rebel commander Kassem Saaddedin said via Skype that rebels had captured six towns north of Hama. He claimed FSA controlled Kafr Zita, and Hasraya. In April 2013, Syrian rebels launched a military operation in the eastern part of the province of Hama, in an attempt to open up a new front, after rebel attacks in the Governorate had stalled. The rebels managed to capture 10 villages during their offensive. However, the Army soon captured 20–23 villages, including most of the ones previously captured by the rebels. On 7 September 2013, it was reported that there were many checkpoints manned by Assad's forces in northwestern Hama province. ISIS also controls some parts of Hama countryside. See also: 2013 Hama offensive. In the middle of 2014, rebels launched an attack on Hama City and Hama military airport. During this offensive, they seized several villages, but the Syrian military quickly launched a counterattack, reversing all rebel gains and taking new villages. As of October 2014, in Northern Hama, rebels were in control of only a few villages near the Idlib Governorate. On 5 October 2017, the Syrian army recaptured all of the area that was under the control of Islamic State of Iraq and the Levant in Hama Governorate, excluding the by-rebel pocket. During January and February 2018, the SAA secured all areas of eastern Hama Governorate controlled by rebel and later ISIL forces in its offensives. During April and May 2018, rebel forces were repelled out of the Rastan-Talbiseh pocket, partially in southern Hama governorate, in an SAA offensive. Between April and August 2019, a majority of the small amount of villages held by rebel forces in northern Hama governorate were captured by the SAA in an offensive. Two other villages in northern Hama governorate were captured by the SAA in the course of its 2019-2020 offensive, being located in the al-Ghab plain, leaving the rebel forces with only six villages in the governorate, also in said plain. During the course of the Operation Deterrence of Aggression through the course of late November and early December 2024, all of Hama governorate was taken over by opposition forces of the Military Operations Command.

== al-Hasakah Governorate ==
Name	Population	District	Held by	History of the Syrian Civil War
Al-Hasakah	188,160	Al-Hasakah District		See Al-Hasakah (Syrian Civil War).
Qamishli	184,231	Qamishli District		In July 2012, rebels control the suburbs of the city. On 21 July, the rebels were intending to capture the largest of the Kurdish cities. On 22 July, clashes erupted between YPG and government forces in which one Kurdish fighter was killed and two were wounded along with one government official. In early August 2012, it was reported that the government administration is intact and functioning but the police and army remain in their barracks. Kurds in Qamishli have demonstrated against the Government and are actually allowed to do so on one street, though some have been shot at by the army in the past. There is a border post near the city. As of 18 December 2013, the government controls some parts of Qamishli, including the airport, the security quarter housing the intelligence services, and the southern areas. Syrian security services move unfettered around the city and the surrounding Arab villages. In many ways, the PYD is neutral in the civil war, because they see it as a war between two evils. Even so, the YPG has sporadically skirmished with Syrian army units for control of checkpoints. Syrian government retains wide control in the city of Qamishli. In February 2014, a Human Rights Watch official explained that the Assad forces and the government were basically present in three places in Qamishli: One is in the center so they call it kind of 'security square.' That also includes some Arab neighborhoods. The second is on the Turkish border at the border crossing. The third is at the airport. See also: 2012 Syrian Kurdistan campaign.
Ras al-Ayn	29,347	Ra's al-'Ayn District		See Ras al-Ayn (Syrian Civil War).
Al-Malikiyah	26,311	Al-Malikiyah District		See Al-Malikiyah (Syrian Civil War).
Qamishli Border Crossing	—	Qamishli District		By late November 2013, the border crossing between Qamishli and the Turkish city of Nusaybin was controlled by the Syrian government.
Simalka Border Crossing	—	Al-Malikiyah District		Border crossing between the towns of Simalka on the Syrian side and Fish Khabur on the Iraqi side was built by Iraqi Kurdistan Regional Government to connect Iraqi Kurdistan with Syrian Kurdish regions. Border crossing is actually only a temporary military bridge over the river Tigris hoisted by Peshmerga to facilitate the transfer of goods and refugees which was opened on 1 February 2013. Since 1991 it was used only by boats and after 2003 it was not used to promote Rabia land border crossing.
Outside listed towns in Al-Hasakah G.		—	30% (Kurdish areas) 70% (Arab areas, border crossings, oil and gas fields)	Territories held by Kurdish forces, ISIL jihadists, by the Syrian Army or contested in the Al-Hasakah Province, as of 23 March 2016 On 8 January 2013, FSA took control of Tishreen oil field. Opposition sources reported that all other oil fields in the Governorate were under Syrian government control. See also: 2012 Syrian Kurdistan campaign.

== Homs Governorate ==
Name	Population	District	Held by	History during the Syrian Civil War
Homs – Abbasiya	33,363	Homs District
Homs – Baba Amr	34,175	Homs District		On 28 February 2012, reinforcements from 4th Armoured Division (Syria), directed by the Maher al-Assad, brother of the Syrian president, took positions in Homs. They managed to completely seal off the city, notably by destroying a tunnel. On the morning of 29 February, the Syrian Army launched a ground assault with infantry on the rebel-held district. On 1 March 2012, the Syrian Army took full control of the quarter of Baba Amr according to a Syrian official. Rebel leaders reported that they pulled out of the quarter and that some fighters stayed to cover the retreat. On 3 July 2012, clashes raged in and around the neighborhood of Baba Amr. On 10 March 2013, rebel fighters launched an assault on the district, around a year after its capture by government troops, in an effort to relieve pressure on besieged rebel-held districts in the city centre. However, the military re-secured the district and repelled the rebels two weeks later.
Homs – Deir Baalbah	44,795	Homs District		In October 2012, FSA took over part of the neighborhood that has been under army control for many months. On 22 December 2012, Deir Baalbah was recaptured by Government forces, and now stands like a ghost town. The government is encouraging former inhabitants to return. Activists reported that up to 200 civilians were killed in the assault.
Homs – Ghouta	12,634	Homs District		On 21 August 2012, the rebel-held district came under sustained Army shelling.
Homs – Jobar	4,242	Homs District		On 20 January 2013, it was reported that the army was fighting to enter Jobar (from four directions) where Free Syrian Army soldiers were present.
Homs – Joret al-Shayyah	16,816	Homs District		On 3 July 2012, the military made an attempt to storm Joret al-Shayyah. On 5 October 2012, Syrian warplanes and artillery pounded Joret al-Shayyah, subjecting it to its worst bombardment in months. Government forces were mainly firing rockets and heavy mortars with an average of 5 rockets falling a minute. Activists say most government forces near Homs are stationed outside the town – a common pattern in rebel strongholds. On 7 May 2014, under the terms of the agreement between the Syrian government and rebels the government forces take over all rebels districts in Homs city and Al-Waer district in western Homs city. However, rebels still hold the suburb.
Homs – Karm al- Shami	35,732	Homs District
Homs – Karm al-Zeitoun	49,132	Homs District		The Syrian Army captured the district of Karm al-Zeitoun by 9 March 2012, before activists reported that the government forces massacred 47 women and children.
Homs – Khaldiyeh	32,337	Homs District		ln early July 2012, the rebel-held neighborhood came under sustained Army shelling. In early October 2012, Syrian warplanes and artillery pounded Khaldiyeh, in an attempt to overtake it. Attacking government forces were mainly firing rockets and heavy mortars with an average of five rockets falling a minute. On 9 December 2012, it was reported that Khaldiyeh was still under rebel control
Homs – Old City	18,907	Homs District		The Old City is the most condensed area of Homs, and it includes the neighborhoods of Bab Tadmur, Bab al-Dreib, and Bab Hud and the area around the citadel. In July and August 2012, the rebel-held Old City was under siege and came under sustained Army shelling. On 5 October 2012, Syrian warplanes and artillery pounded Old Homs, subjecting it to its worst bombardment in months. Government forces were mainly firing rockets and heavy mortars with an average of 5 rockets falling a minute. On 9 December 2012, it was reported that the Old City was still under rebel control On 7 May 2014, under the terms of the agreement between the Syrian government and rebels the government forces take over all rebels districts in Homs city and Al Waer district in western Homs city. However, rebels still hold the suburb.
Homs – Qusour	21,534	Homs District		On 5 October 2012, Syrian warplanes and artillery pounded Qusour, in an attempt to overtake it. Government forces were mainly firing rockets and heavy mortars with an average of 5 rockets falling a minute. On 7 May, under the terms of the agreement between the Syrian government and rebels the government forces take over all rebels districts in Homs city and Al Waer district in western Homs city. However, rebels still hold the suburb.
Homs – al-Waer		Homs District		In March 2017 rebels fighters agreed with Syrian officials a withdraw from al-Waer to al-Bab in Idlib Governorate.
Homs	353,184	Homs District		Situation in Homs as of May 2014 January 2012 saw intense fighting in the opposition stronghold of Homs, as the opposition claimed to be in control of two-thirds of the city. However, starting on 3 February 2012, the Syrian army launched a major offensive to take rebel-held neighborhoods in the city. By the end of March, and after weeks of artillery bombardments and heavy street fighting, the Syrian army retakes control of half a dozen districts, leaving them in control of 70 percent of the city. By March 2013, the military was in control of 80 percent of the city. On 7 May, under the terms of the agreement between the Syrian government and rebels the government forces take over all rebels districts in Homs city and Al Waer district in western Homs city. See also: Siege of Homs and 2012 Homs offensive.
Al-Mukharram	6,202	Al-Mukharram District		Al-Mukharram and the localities of its district have a significant Alawite population. The government has maintained control.
Palmyra	51,323	Palmyra District		See Palmyra (Syrian Civil War).
Al-Qusayr	29,818	Al-Qusayr District		Al-Qusayr, which lies along the Lebanese border, is a critical node in rebel supply lines that links the predominantly Sunni areas of Lebanon's northern Bekaa valley. Rebels had been fighting loyalist troops in the border town long before the survivors of the Farouq Brigades arrived, but in the second half of March, fighting in al-Qusayr picked up. Rebels and loyalist troops had reached an uneasy stalemate in the city by the time the ceasefire went into effect in mid-April, since neither side had been able to expel the other from the town, but by the end of May, the pace of fighting had picked up again and gun battles raged two out of every three days in al-Qusayr On 10 July 2012, Al-Qusayr was completely under rebel control with the city being under siege from the surrounding countryside. However, later, it was confirmed that government troops still held the town's main road. On 5 June it was confirmed that government troops were if full control of Al-Qusayr See also: Battle of Al-Qusayr and Al-Qusayr offensive.
Al-Rastan	39,834	Ar-Rastan District		See Al-Rastan (Syrian Civil War).
Taldou	15,727	Taldou District		See Taldou (Syrian Civil War).
Talkalakh	18,412	Talkalakh District		On 15 May 2011, the Syrian military entered the town which is on the border with Lebanon, in a crackdown against pro-democracy protesters. There followed reports that the military was massacring members of the Syrian opposition. The reports were mostly from civilians fleeing over the Kabir River into Lebanon to escape the violence. By 19 May, the military finished its operation and withdrew from Talkalakh. Since June 2012, FSA has controlled some neighbourhoods of the city, however, the government has retained control of loyalist and mixed neighbourhoods. In late October 2012, Talkalakh was under siege by the army. On 12 February 2013, a CNN report from inside Talkalakh revealed that the town itself was under rebel control, though government forces were only a matter of yards away, surrounding the town. Nevertheless, there was no fighting in or around the town thanks to a tenuous ceasefire between the warring sides brokered by a local sheikh and an Alawite member of parliament. Though isolated clashes have occurred, killing three rebels, and though government forces have been accused of harassing civilians since its implementation, the ceasefire has largely held. The town has returned to a degree of normal function, and some shops have started to re-open. Even the governor of Homs Province has been able to meet with rebels in the town and has called the ceasefire an "experiment". Both sides reject sectarianism, stressing the need to keep foreign jihadist fighters out of the country. Nevertheless, rebels in the town stated that they remained committed to overthrowing Assad. On 23 June, the Syrian Army captured the town. Following the assault, 39 local leaders of the Free Syrian Army surrendered and handed over their weapons. The Syrian opposition denied the town had fallen and claimed there was still fighting ongoing however reporters on the ground said there was no sign of it.
Abil	2,873	Homs District		On 20 January 2013, it was reported that FSA overran the Um al-Sakhar air defense base, (that is located near the rebel-held town of Abil and two km north of the village of al-Buwaydah) and took weapons and ammunition from it. On 18 April, the Syrian Army took control over the town of Abel
Al-Buwaydah al-Sharqiyah	3,196	Al-Qusayr District		The village was the site of the al-Buwaida al-Sharqiya massacre in May 2012, during the Syrian Civil War. Opposition activists claimed 13 factory workers were killed by the government's security forces, while Syrian government sources blamed rebel forces for the killings On 8 June 2013, the town was recaptured by the Syrian Army during the Al-Qusayr offensive.
Al-Husn	8,980	Talkalakh District		On 22 January 2014, heavy clashes raged in al-Hosn On 20 March 2014, the Syrian troops recaptured the town of Al-Hosn close to the border.
Outside listed towns in Homs G.		—		Since June 2012, FSA has control of parts of rural Homs. At the beginning of 2015 the Syrian troops controls most of Homs province. At May 2018, the Syrian Army and allies regain full control of the rebel-held northern Homs pocket, including Rastan, Talbiseh, and Houla See also: Northern Homs offensive (April–May 2018).

== Idlib Governorate ==
Name	Population	District	Held by	History during the Syrian Civil War
Idlib	98,791	Idlib District		Additional armored and artillery units arrived outside Idlib by 11 March and began deploying into the city by 12 March. On 12 February 2012, the entire city of Idlib was under opposition control but was preparing for an attack by the government. In mid-March 2012, rebels in Idlib offered stiff resistance but could not defeat the military's tanks and the city fell in a matter of days. As of 7 June 2012, the edges of the city and the surrounding areas belong to the rebels. On 20 January 2013, a coordinated attack on Idlib city was begun by the FSA. They overran several checkpoints on the Western edges of Idlib, one attack at Rodoko checkpoint led to the killing of 15 Syrian Army soldiers (the rest fled on foot) and allowed rebels to capture 3 tanks and the checkpoints weapons cache. Furthermore, rebels could start to siege the central prison of Idlib, which holds more than 600 inmates. On 28 March 2015, the rebel coalition Jaish Al-Fatah captured Idlib City. See also: 2011–2012 Idlib Governorate clashes, February 2012 Idlib Operation, Battle of Idlib and Idlib Governorate clashes (June 2012 – April 2013), 2014 Idlib offensive, al-Nusra Front–SRF/Hazzm Movement conflict, Idlib Governorate clashes (January–March 2017), Idlib Governorate clashes (July 2017).
Ariha	39,501	Arihah District		See Ariha (Syrian Civil War).
Harem	21,934	Harem District		Harem is situated exactly on the border of Turkey. Since June 2012, the government has maintained control. In October, the FSA gained control of the town. Army troops remain surrounded in the town's citadel. On 25 December, the FSA gained complete control over the town after government forces that were surrounded in the town's ancient citadel surrendered after a 70-day siege. In December 2013, the Islamic State of Iraq and the Levant announced its entire control over Harem. By January 2014, clashes were ongoing in the town as part of the Syrian opposition–Islamic State of Iraq and the Levant conflict.
Jisr al-Shughur	39,917	Jisr ash-Shugur District		See Jisr al-Shughur (Syrian Civil War).
Maarrat al-Nu'man	58,008	Maarat al-Numaan District		See Maarrat al-Nu'man (Syrian Civil War).
Azmarin	3,720	Harem District		In June 2012, FSA was reported to have control of this town located on the border with Turkey. At a later date, FSA lost control of the town. On 14 October, rebels recaptured it after a three-day siege. The remaining government soldiers fled during the night, some across the Turkish border and into Turkish custody. Dr. Ghnnam worked as a urologist in Azmarin before taking command of rebel forces in the town.
Bab al-Hawa Border Crossing	—	Harem District		It is a frequent place of crossing for Syrians trying to reach the refugee camp in nearby Reyhanlı. Drivers complained in December 2011 that they had been stalled at the crossing for days after customs officials stopped allowing vehicles with Turkish registrations to enter Syria. The crossing is a major route for smuggling, particularly oil and gas, and has seen a dramatic rise in weapons smuggling. On 19 July 2012, the FSA with 200 fighters seized the border crossing and defaced images of Syrian President Bashar al-Assad. On 22 July 2012, Turkish armed forces further restricted border crossings of their own nationals. Crisply dressed rebels check passports of new arrivals, enter names into computers and extend a welcome hand to "Free Syria." In mid-August 2012, FSA fighters attacked tanks and helicopters from the government near the Turkish border, foiling an attempt to take over the Bab al-Hawa border gateway. By early December 2013, fighters from the Islamic Front ousted FSA-aligned fighters from the border crossing.
Binnish	21,848	Idlib District		Binnish has been a major protest hub. On 13 October 2011, clashes were reported in the city. FSA takes control in December 2011 – January 2012. The Syrian Army then later assaulted Idlib city in March 2012 in a major operation. As early as 23 March, it was reported Binnish was one of their next targets. Binnish is on a hill, so it is harder to assault. The Syrian Army had agreed to Kofi Annan's peace plan and to withdraw troops by 10 April. By 3 April, CNN reported the Syrian Army was assaulting Binnish with tanks and helicopters. On 4 April 2012, the Syrian Army was still shelling Binnish with citizens fleeing the city. In June, the government has control. In November, the town was under rebel control. In March 2013, it was reported that rebels in Binnish have negotiated a limited ceasefire with regime forces in nearby Idlib, in which the regime abstains from shelling the town in exchange for opposition assurances that they will not attack a village of minorities nearby By November 2013, the Islamic State of Iraq and the Levant was in full control of the town. In January 2014, army begin operation against rebel positions in Binnish.
Al-Dana	14,208	Harem District		Since July 2012, it is under FSA control. However, al-Jazeera reported that the Islamic State of Iraq and the Levant controlled entirely the town since early July 2013. ISIS rebels withdrew from Al-Dana. See also:Syrian opposition–Islamic State of Iraq and the Levant conflict.
Darkush	5,295	Jisr al-Shughur District		On 28 March 2012, it was reported that two British journalists of Algerian descent, Nassim Terreri and Walid Bledi, were killed by the pro-government militia Shabiha in this town located on the border with Turkey. The freelance journalists were filming a documentary about refugees fleeing the violence. In June 2012, FSA was reported to have control of Darkush. At a later date, FSA lost control of the town. On 11 October, rebels recaptured it.
Kafr Nabl	15,455	Maarat al-Numaan District		FSA takes control in December 2011 – January 2012. After that, the government recaptured the town. On 11 August 2012, the FSA took it back after a 4-day fight and started reorganizing the town by working on reestablishing electricity, water, telephone and opening the bakeries. On 30 December, ISIS takes on Kafranbel. In January 2014, the ISIS withdrew from the town following mass protests and clashes that were part of the Syrian opposition–Islamic State of Iraq and the Levant conflict.
Khan Shaykhun	34,371	Maarat al-Numaan District		FSA takes control in December 2011 – January 2012. Fell in government hands on 6 July 2012. The rebels withdrew when a larger force arrived, backed by attack helicopters that the rebels had no way of countering. Once inside the city, the troops set homes on fire and arrested dozens of people. On 17 December 2012, government positions in Khan Shaykhun were reportedly under attack by rebel forces. In May 2014, it was reported that the rebels had captured most of the city with the exception of two regime-held bases (Al-Khazanat & Sallam_Checkpoints). From the end of October 2014 the city is the main stronghold of Jabhat al-Nusra. On 20 August 2019, the rebel and Islamic factions including jihadi groups like a Hayat Tahrir al-Sham have withdrawn from Khan Shaykhun in the southern countryside of Idlib completely. The city was reclaimed by Tahrir al-Sham in late November 2024, during the Operation Deterrence of Aggression. See also: Northwestern Syria offensive (April 2019–present).
Maarrat Misrin	17,519	Idlib District		On 12 December 2011, opposition activists claimed the Syrian Army "indiscriminately" killed eleven people in the town. The incident began when soldiers allegedly shot dead two civilians in Maarrat Misrin prompting residents to block the main road leading to the town. The army then fired randomly, resulting in eleven deaths. The next day, two more residents were shot by Syrian security forces during a funeral procession for those killed the previous day. According to a Syrian military source cited by Syrian Documents, on 7 September 2012, the Syrian Army ambushed a rebel unit in Maarrat Misrin. A total of 42 were killed. In December 2012 the FSA took control of the city. By November 2013, the Islamic State of Iraq and the Levant was in full control of the town. In early January 2014, fighting raged between ISIS and non-ISIS rebels in the Syrian opposition–Islamic State of Iraq and the Levant conflict.
Saraqib	32,495	Idlib District		FSA takes control in December 2011 – January 2012. Saraqib was considered an important strategic point because of its size, being the second largest city of the Governorate, and its geographic position at the junction of two highways going to Aleppo: one going south towards Hama, Homs and Damascus, and one going west towards Latakia. It was also used as a base to launch attacks on military convoys. On 24 March, eleven days after the Syrian Army took back Idlib, the Syrian Army shelled the city briefly while leading a ground assault at the same time. A column of tanks entered the city to attack the defenses of the rebels, while infantry backed by snipers led the second wave to pursue the remaining fighters. The Free Syrian Army fighters fought back on the first day and damaged a tank. After the first day, the rebels were forced to withdraw from the city after the army took full control of it. In July 2012, it was reported that the FSA had regained control of the city. On 24 October, there was fierce shelling targeting the city from the Hamsho check point. On 2 November 2012, Syrian forces loyal to President Bashar al-Assad have withdrawn from their last base near Saraqeb, further weakening his ability to fight rebels in the city of Aleppo. In January 2014, the town saw heavy clashes between ISIS and other Syrian rebel groups, but ISIS remained in control of the strategic town. See also: Battle of Saraqeb. On 19 July 2017, Hayat Tahrir al-Sham took Saraqib from Ahrar al-Sham. On 6 February 2020, the Syrian Army captured the city. The city was reclaimed by Tahrir al-Sham in late November 2024, during the Operation Deterrence of Aggression.
Sarmin	14,530	Idlib District		FSA had gained control over Sarmin. By 3 April, the Syrian Army had retaken Sarmin as part of the April 2012 Idlib Governorate Operation which was initiated by the Syrian government to make gains against the rebels, prior to the implementation of the U.N. brokered ceasefire, planned for 10 April. Sarmin's mosque was severely damaged. By November 2012, Sarmin was back under FSA control.
Taftanaz	8,540	Idlib District		The town has been a center for opposition protests The Battle of Taftanaz started on 3 April 2012. Heavy fighting took place on the outskirts of the town, killing 20 people. By 5 April, the military captured Taftanaz's city center, which was defended by 200 FSA fighters, after a two-hour battle, following which the army reportedly rounded up and executed 82 people. It was unknown how many were opposition fighters and how many were civilians. Witnesses in the town said that tanks shelled the town from four sides before armored cars brought in dozens of soldiers who dragged civilians from their homes and gunned them down in the streets, and they also claimed that the soldiers looted, destroyed and torched hundreds of homes, bringing some down on their owners' heads. Videos showed this, and 62 people were killed during the attack, despite the town only having a small rebel presence. Nine government tanks were destroyed by homemade bombs as they left the town. Two months after, two-thirds of the population had left. On 29 August 2012, rebels claim to have attacked a "military air base in Taftanaz" damaging several Government helicopters. Their claims could not be independently verified. In November, the town was under rebel control. On 2 January 2013, the strategic Taftanaz military airbase (which rebels have repeatedly tried to capture but failed) was attacked by rebels launching what they called "the battle to liberate Taftanaz Military airport" involving three rebel brigades.
Outside listed towns in Idlib G.		—		By June 2012, large parts of Idlib Governorate are controlled by FSA who (along with local people), administered justice and the distribution of supplies to residents. Sham Falcons (led by General Mustafa al-Sheikh) operate in Jabal al-Zawiya. Eight out of the 35 villages of the Zawiya Mountain, around 25%, were reportedly under opposition control. On 18 October 2012, Al Jazeera reported that rebels were giving classes to children in caves in Jabal al-Zawiya after the regime destroyed schools By November 2012, the FSA had taken control of 65% of the Governorate. According to Human Rights Watch, when rebels took control of the northern village of Zarzur on 11 December 2012, they vandalised and deliberately set fire to a Shi'a hussainia. According to residents, government forces had used the building as a barracks, but had abandoned it due to local complaints before the town was taken by rebels. The town's Shi'a minority has since largely fled the village. Al Nusra Front and a number of Islamist militias, along with a small number of FSA groups, now controlled between 70 and 80 percent of Idlib province. See also: 2011–2012 Idlib Governorate clashes, Summer 2011 Jabal al-Zawiya operation, October 2011 Jabal al-Zawiya clashes, December 2011 Jabal al-Zawiya massacres, December 2011 Syrian–Turkish border clash, April 2012 Idlib Governorate Operation, Idlib Governorate clashes (2014) and Northwestern Syria offensive (April 2019–present)

== Latakia Governorate ==
Name	Population	District	Held by	History during the Syrian Civil War
Latakia	383,786	Latakia District		See Latakia (Syrian Civil War).
Al-Haffah	4,298	Al-Haffah District		Al-Haffah is a Sunni Muslim town that lies in the foothills of the coastal mountains that form the heartland of Assad's Alawi sect. It is strategically located close to the port city of Latakia, as well as, the Turkish border which has been used by the rebels to smuggle people and supplies. On 12 June 2012, the military recaptured al-Haffah, and the remaining 200 FSA fighters under heavy bombardment by government forces withdrew from the town. FSA said that the fact that Al-Haffah is surrounded by Alawi villages did not help them. The rebels were reported to have retreated to Turkey.
Jableh	53,989	Jableh District		See Jableh (Syrian Civil War).
Qardaha	8,671	Qardaha District		See Qardaha (Syrian Civil War).
Kesab	1,754	Latakia District		Kesab, which has a border post, is three kilometers away from the Turkish border and is mainly populated by Armenians with an Alawite minority. On 13 October 2012, rebels were attacking the town. Since November 2012, Turkmen rebels tried to take control of the town and its border post, however, they were prevented from doing so by the local Alawite militias formed there. Local Alawite militias continue to exercise control over the area. In late December, the town was reportedly shelled by unspecified forces, but no residents were killed or injured. On 24 March 2014, the Islamist rebels and their jihadist ally Al-Nusra Front seized the small city of Kasab and nearby Kasab border crossing. However they were repelled and forced back by the Syrian army and allied NDF forces (including by Syrian Resistance of Ali Kayali) by the end of June 2014.
Outside listed towns in Latakia G.		—		Situation in the Latakia Governorate in December 2016 Syrian Army control Opposition control Since June 2012, FSA controls a small part in the northeast. In late July 2012, France 24 reported that the army has been burning forests to avoid FSA hiding in them. By October 2012, the FSA slowly captured most of the Jebel Akrad and Jebel Turkman mountain ranges in the north. Rebels have taken control of six Alawite villages in the region, in some cases intimidating the locals to leave by way of kidnappings, theft, and looting of homes. There are fears even among elements of the opposition that if the conflict continues to spread, rebel forces may perpetrate larger sectarian revenge killings. The region of the province now controlled by rebels was home to a sizeable Kurdish minority prior to the war. Most Kurds have fled from the 60 villages in the region they once inhabited due to the fighting, but many are too poor to afford to flee to neighbouring Turkey. Those who are internally displaced have resettled in refugee camps close to the border, such as one near Khirbet al-Joz, where a farmer has been converting part of his land with the help of a Qatari company into a camp that will be able to house 10,000 refugees once completed. According to Human Rights Watch, rebel forces also broke into and looted churches in the Christian villages of Ghassaniyeh and Jdeideh after taking control of them, though it was not clear if sectarianism was the motive. Several locals had been kidnapped by rebels, who also looted homes. Much of the population of the villages had fled. See also: Latakia Governorate campaign.

== Quneitra Governorate ==
Name	Population	District	Held by	History during the Syrian Civil War
Quneitra	4,318	Quneitra District		See Quneitra (Syrian Civil War).
Outside listed towns in Quneitra G.		—		As of 13 September 2014 the Syrian government has lost control of about 80 percent of towns and villages in Quneitra province. In July 2018, the entire rebel-held part of Al-Quneitra province surrendered to the Syrian army and rebels begin evacuation from the Syrian south, towards the Syrian north. See also: Quneitra Governorate clashes (2012–14)

== Raqqa Governorate ==
Name	Population	District	Held by	History during the Syrian Civil War
Raqqa	220,488	Raqqa District		See Raqqa (Syrian Civil war and ISIS).
Tell Abyad	14,825	Tal Abyad District		The Free Syrian Army took control over the city on 19 September 2012. Tell Abyad under control Islamic State of Iraq and the Levant. While rebels in Raqa appeared to be advancing, ISIL was fighting back in the countryside, especially in the border town of Tal Abyad, from which they were expelled earlier this week. In the first weekend of January 2014, ISIS forces recaptured the town. The YPG and FSA captured Tal Abyad from ISIS on 15 June 2015.
Al-Thawrah (Tabqah)	69,425	Al-Thawrah District		See Al-Thawrah (Syrian Civil War).
Outside listed towns in Raqqa G.		—	((part of Northern Raqqa))	On 1 January 2013, it was reported that a majority of Raqqa Governorate was in rebel control. On 4 March 2013, FSA forces captured the provincial capital of Raqqa. While ISIS has captured the remaining SAA outposts left in Raqqa Governorate, the Tabqa (Thawra) military airbase, as well as the army bases of Division 17 near the city of Raqqa and of Brigade 93 near the town of Ayn Isa. See also: Syrian Kurdistan campaign (2012–present).

== as-Suwayda Governorate ==
Name	Population	District	Held by	History during the Syrian Civil War
As-Suwayda	73,641	As-Suwayda District	al-Hijri militia	See As-Suwayda (Syrian Civil War). See also Southern Syria offensive (2024)
Salkhad	9,155	Salkhad District	al-Hijri militia	The Assad regime has maintained control of this town located in the central Jabal el Druze highlands in 2012.
Shahba	13,660	Shahba District	al-Hijri militia	The Assad regime has maintained control of this town located in the Jabal el Druze in 2012.
Outside listed towns in As-Suwayda G.		—	al-Hijri militia ~2/3% (Druze areas) ~1/3% (Bedouin Arab areas)

== Tartus Governorate ==
Name	Population	District	Held by	History during the Syrian Civil War
Tartus	115,769	Tartus District		Syrian army kept control of this Alawi stronghold and naval facility in 2012.
Baniyas	41,632	Baniyas District		See Baniyas (Syrian Civil War).
Duraykish	13,244	Dreikiche District		Syrian army kept control of this town in 2012.
Safita	20,301	Safita District		Syrian army kept control of this town in 2012.
Al-Shaykh Badr	47,982	Ash-Shaykh Badr District		Syrian army kept control of this town in 2012.
Outside listed towns in Tartus G.		—		The government has maintained control of this Governorate that has an Alawi majority in 2012.

== See also ==
- List of airports in Syria
- Spillover of the Syrian Civil War
