= Tell Touqan =

Tell Touqan تل طوقان Tall Tukan
- Village
- Location in Syria
- Coordinates: 35°49′21″N 36°57′11″E
- Country: Syria
- Governorate: Idlib
- District: Idlib
- Subdistrict: Abu al-Thuhur

Population (2004)
  - Total: 3,531

Tell Touqan (Arabic: تل طوقان, also spelled Tell Toqan, Tell Tuqan, or Tall Tukan) is a village in northwestern Syria, administratively part of the Idlib Governorate, located about 45 kilometres (28 mi) southwest of Aleppo. Nearby localities include Tell Sultan and Tell Kalbah to the east, Abu al-Thuhur to the southeast, Shaykh Idris to the southwest, Kafr Amim to the west, Saraqib to the northwest and Jazraya to the north. According to the Syria Central Bureau of Statistics (CBS), Tell Touqan had a population of 3,531 at the 2004 census.

== Archaelogical Site ==
The village of Tell Touqan is built atop a large tell (artificial mound). The mound has an area of about 27 hectares (67 acres), encircled by the remains of a tall wall as well as an inner wall within the perimeter and gaps in between the walls. This suggests the previous existence of a citadel with gates. The ruins of an acropolis are also located on the mound.

== History ==
=== Bronze Age ===
It has been suggested that Tell Touqan corresponds with Thaknu in Egyptian pharaoh Thutmose III's list of settlements and the Tukhan of Assyrian emperor Tiglath-pileser II's list. The site, situated 15 kilometres (9.3 mi) northwest of the Dead City of Ebla, has been identified with the Bronze Age city of "Ursa'um" which served as a major regional center in the 24th century BCE. More comprehensive research suggests Ursa'um to be closer to Gaziantep in Turkey. A number of archaeology experts have said Tell Touqan's identification with Ursa'um is not possible. It was destroyed by the Assyrians around the same time as Ebla, but was later rebuilt after Ebla's reestablishment.

=== Ottoman and French Mandatory periods ===
Tell Touqan was named after Abdullah Touqan, a sheikh (chief) of the Touqan, a subtribe of the Mawali, a Bedouin confederation which dominated northern Syria before the 18th century. Before it gained its current name, the village was called Tell al-Dahab which translates as the 'Golden Mound'. Abdullah al-Touqan was slain by rivals within the Mawali, after which the area around the village was taken over by the Al Bu-Layl, a segment of the Uqaydat, which had migrated to the Homs region from the Euphrates River valley around 1860 and allied with the Mawali; their initial settlement in several surrounding villages was as shepherds and by the late 19th century they had transitioned to farming.

The modern village of Tell Touqan itself was founded by a retired Turkish officer of the Ottoman army from Salonika, Yahya Agha Salaheddin (locally referred to as 'Bayni Basha') during the reign of Sultan Abdulaziz (r. 1861–1876). Yahya Agha brought some of his former soldiers and distributed Tell Touqan's lands among them or hired them as farmhands. Three of Yahya Agha's grandsons continued to live in the village at least into the mid-20th century and owned a considerable proportion of its lands and several peasants from the village were descendants of his soldiers. After World War I, when the Ottomans were driven out of Syria, many Al Bu Layl tribesmen moved to Tell Touqan and the village population had become an ethnically mixed, made up of Arabs from different tribes, Turks and Kurds.

=== Post-Syrian independence ===
In the late 19th and early 20th centuries Tell Touqan was a feudal (musha) village. In the mid-1950s only seven of the village's 56 families were landowners. The remaining 49 families were either employed as farm workers or sharecroppers. About 19 feddans were owned by the founder of Tell Touqan and his descendants, ten were owned by a tribal chief, Shaykh Nuri, who settled in the village, and the remaining seven feddans were owned by four other residents. The feudalism of Tell Touqan was not deep-rooted and most of the land was assigned to its owners by the Ottoman government. Following the consolidation of socialist Baath Party rule in Syria the system ended.

== Archaeology ==
=== Early Bronze ===
In the EBIVB, Tell Touqan was occupied and most likely part of the Kingdom of Ebla. In Area N Phase 7 (EB IVB; c. 2200/2150-2000 BC) was "Building N4".

=== Middle Bronze ===
==== Middle Bronze I ====
In the MBI (c. 2000-1820 BCE), there is little evidence of occupation.

In Area N there is Phase 5 (MB IB; 1900-1800 BC; Necropolis), Phase 6 (MB IA; 2000-1900 BC, House N3).

==== Middle Bronze II ====
In MBIIA (c. 1820 BCE), Phase 3 belongs to the early part while Phase 2A-B (c. 1800–1700/1650 BC) belongs to the later. In early MBIIB, the occupation may have ended.

In Area N there Phase 2 (MB IIB1; 1700-1650 BC; Large Refuse Pit), Phase 3 (MB IIA2; 1750-1700; House N1), Phase 4 (MB IIA1; 1800-1750 BC; House N2).

=== Iron Age ===
In the Iron Age II, Phase 1 dated to c. 720–535 BC.

=== Islamic Period ===
In Area N, Phase 1 is dated to the Islamic period with a necropolis.

== Bibliography ==
- Astour, Michael C. (2002). "A Reconstruction of the History of Ebla (Part 2)". In Gordon, Cyrus H.; Rendsburg, Gary A. (eds.). Eblaitica: Essays on the Ebla Archives and Eblaite Language, Volume 4. New York: Eisenbrauns. pp. 57–196. ISBN 1-57506-060-4.
- Barjamovic, Gokjo (2011). Historical Geography of Anatolia in the Old Assyrian Colony Period. Museum Tusculanum Press. ISBN 978-87-635-3645-5.
- Bermant, Chaim (1979). Ebla: A Revelation in Archaeology. Times Book. ISBN 978-0-8129-0765-0.
- Gerber, Haim (1994). The Social Origins of the Modern Middle East. Lynne Rienner Publishers. ISBN 978-1-55587-509-1.
- Sweet, Louise (1960). Tell Toqaan, A Syrian Village. The Regents of the University of Michigan, The Museum of Anthropology. ISBN 978-0-932206-20-6.
