= Khan al-Sabil =

Khan al-Sabil خان السبل Khan Sobol, Khan Sebil, Khan Sabl
- Village
- Location within Syria
- Coordinates: 35°45′27″N 36°45′23″E
- Country: Syria
- Governorate: Idlib
- District: Idlib
- Subdistrict: Saraqib

Population (2004)
  - Total: 6,551
- Time zone: UTC+2 (EET)
  - Summer (DST): UTC+3 (EEST)

Khan al-Sabil (Arabic: خان السبل) is a village in northwestern Syria, administratively part of Idlib District of the Idlib Governorate, located south of Idlib. It is situated on either side of the Aleppo-Damascus highway, just east of the Jabal Zawiya mountain. Nearby localities include Maarrat al-Nu'man and Babila to the south, Masaran to the southeast, Shaykh Idris to the east, Maardibsah, Mardikh and Saraqib to the north and Kafr Battikh to the northwest.

According to the Syria Central Bureau of Statistics, Khan al-Sabil had a population of 6,551 at the time of the 2004 census.

== History ==
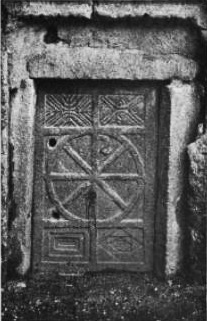
Basalt door of an ancient structure in Khan al-Sabil, pre-1903

The village contains several ancient ruins; among them are buildings with doors made of basalt. The doors are the largest of their kind in the greater Aleppo region. They were decorated with Christian symbols. In the 20th century, two of these doors were part of buildings still used by Khan al-Sabil's residents.

Khan al-Sabil is located on an ancient caravan route and is named after an old khan (caravanserai) of the same name located in the village. The modern village was built around the khan, which was established in 1371 by the Bahri Mamluk ruler of Syria, al-Malik al-Ashraf. Its upkeep and amenities were financed by a waqf (Islamic religious trust). The khan fell into disuse in the first years of the 20th century, or perhaps even earlier.

During the Syrian Civil War, Khan al-Sabil served as military headquarters for the Hazzm Movement, a rebel outfit fighting against the Syrian government. The village was taken over by the al-Qaeda-linked group, the Nusra Front, following their victory over the Hazzm Movement in the area.

== Bibliography ==
- Burton, Richard Francis (1872), Unexplored Syria: Visits to the Libanus, the Tulúl El Safá, the Anti-Libanus, the Northern Libanus, and the ʻAláh, vol. 2, Tinsley Brothers
- Butler, Howard Crosby (1903), Architecture and Other Arts, vol. 2, The Century Company
- Constable, Olivia Remia (2004), Housing the Stranger in the Mediterranean World: Lodging, Trade, and Travel in Late Antiquity and the Middle Ages, Cambridge University Press, ISBN 9781139449687
- Garrett, Robert (1914), Topography and Itinerary, vol. 1, Century Company
