= Battle of Saraqib =

2012 battle of the Syrian Civil War

Battle of Saraqeb
- Part of the Idlib Governorate clashes (September 2011–March 2012)
Date	24–27 March 2012 (3 days)
Location	Saraqeb, Idlib Governorate, Syria 35°51′49″N 36°48′02″E
Result	Syrian government victory

Belligerents
Syrian opposition	(Syria) Syrian Government

Units involved
(Syrian opposition) Free Syrian Army; (Syrian opposition) Syrian Liberation Army	Syrian Army; 11th Armoured Division; 60th Armoured Brigade; 76th Armoured Brigade

Casualties and losses
(Syrian opposition) 30+ fighters killed	28 soldiers killed
- 100 killed overall
- Location within Syria

The Battle of Saraqeb started eleven days after the victory of the Syrian Army in the Battle of Idlib of March 2012, where they took back the main city of Idlib province. Saraqib was considered an important strategic point because of its size, being the second largest city of the province, and its geographic position at the junction of two highways going to Aleppo: one going south towards Hama, Homs and Damascus, and one going west towards Latakia. It was also used as a base to launch attacks on military convoys.

On 24 March, the Syrian Army shelled the city briefly while leading a ground assault at the same time. A column of tanks entered the city to attack the defenses of the rebels, while infantry backed by snipers led the second wave to pursue the remaining fighters. The Free Syrian Army fighters fought back the first day and damaged a tank. In the fighting 18 of them were killed. After the first day, the rebels were forced to withdraw from the city after the army took full control of it. An opposition group accused the army of burning most of the shops in the town and called for observers to come in the city. After the battle, security forces and Shabiha militia searched for suspected rebels and captured at least 24 and executed them.

On 28 March, the army continued their offensive and took control of Khan al-Sabil, a village near Saraqeb. The Arab news channel Al Jazeera showed video footage of the destruction of the city during the battle which killed dozens of armed men and civilians.

== Aftermath ==
On 1 November 2012 rebels attacked three, and overran at least one, army checkpoints on the road to Saraqeb, killing eight soldiers and seven rebels. The rebels captured and killed two government soldiers by beating and shooting. On 2 November, the Syrian Army had completely withdrawn from Saraqib. After capturing Saraqib, the FSA started to bomb the Syrian Army's Taftanaz Military Airbase.
