= Tell al-Sultan =

Tell al-Sultan (or Tall as-Sultan, Tell es-Sultan and Tell Sultan) could refer to the following locations:

- Tell Sultan, a village in northern Syria
- Tel al-Sultan, a refugee camp in the southern Gaza Strip
- Tell es-Sultan, an archaeological site near Jericho in the West Bank
