= Syrian–Turkish border clash =

Syrian-Turkish border clash may refer to:

- December 2011 Syrian–Turkish border clash
- 2012 Syrian–Turkish border clashes
