= Ghanem Ibrahim al-Hassan =

Syrian army Brigadier General (died 2011)

- Born: Homs, Syria
- Died: December 2011; Idlib, Syria
- Military career
- Allegiance: Ba'athist Syria
- Branch: Syrian Army
- Rank: Brigadier General
- Conflicts: Syrian Civil War: Idlib Governorate clashes (September 2011–March 2012)

Ghanem Ibrahim al-Hassan was a Syrian Brigadier General who was shot and killed in Idlib by armed opposition fighters during the Syrian civil war, in the 2011 Idlib clashes, according to Syrian state media SANA. He had been training soldiers at the Assad Military Engineering Academy in the town of Saraqib in Idlib. According to SANA, al-Hasan was from Homs.
