= Tell Sultan =

Tell Sultan تل سلطان
- Village
- Location within Syria
- Coordinates: 35°49′22″N 36°57′13″E
- Country: Syria
- Governorate: Idlib
- District: Idlib
- Subdistrict: Abu al-Thuhur

Population (2004 census)
  - Total: 2,389
- Time zone: UTC+2 (EET)
  - Summer (DST): UTC+3 (EEST)

Tell Sultan (Arabic: تل سلطان; also spelled Tall as-Sultan) is a town in northwestern Syria, administratively part of the Idlib Governorate, located southeast of Idlib and 37 kilometers southwest of Aleppo. Nearby localities include Abu al-Thuhur to the southeast, Tell Mardikh to the southwest, Saraqib to the west and Tell Touqan to the northwest. According to the Syria Central Bureau of Statistics, Tell Sultan had a population of 2,389 in the 2004 census.

== History ==
Tell as-Sultan translates as the 'Sultan's Hill'. It received this name after Alp Arslan, the sultan of the Seljuk Empire, encamped at the hill during his siege of Aleppo in 1070 CE. Saladin and his Ayyubid army decisively defeated the Zengid army led by Ghazi II Saif ud-Din in a battle on the site of Tell Sultan in 1176.

The town was visited in the early 13th century by the geographer Yaqut al-Hamawi who noted it was a "day's march from Halab (Aleppo) towards Damascus" and that it contained "a caravanserai and a rest-house for travelers". Later, in 1232, the regent queen of Aleppo, Dayfa Khatun received Fatima Khatun, the daughter of Ayyubid sultan al-Kamil, and Baha ad-Din ibn Shaddad at a ceremony in Tell Sultan.

== Bibliography ==
- Ibn al-Athir (2007). D.S. Richards (ed.). The Chronicle of Ibn al-Athir for the Crusading Period from al-Kamil fi'l-ta'rikh, Part 2. Great Britain: Ashgate Publishing Ltd. ISBN 978-0-7546-4078-3.
- le Strange, Guy (1890). Palestine Under the Moslems: A Description of Syria and the Holy Land from A.D. 650 to 1500. Committee of the Palestine Exploration Fund.
- Tabbaa, Yasser (1997). Constructions of Power and Piety in Medieval Aleppo. Penn State Press. ISBN 0271015624.
