= Idlib Governorate clashes (September 2011 – March 2012) =

Syrian conflict battles

September 2011 – March 2012 Idlib Governorate clashes
- Part of the Early insurgency phase of the Syrian civil war and the Idlib insurgency
- Map of Idlib Governorate
Date	8 September 2011 – 27 March 2012 (6 months, 2 weeks and 5 days)
Location	Idlib Governorate, Syria
Result	Syrian opposition victory: Government forces launched counter-offensive; FSA takes control of Saraqib, Binnish, Sarmin, Ariha, Zardana, al-Bara and Taftanaz

Belligerents
Syrian Opposition; (Syrian opposition) Free Syrian Army; Kata’ib Ahrar Al-Sham; Al-Nusra Front; Free Officers Movement (until 23 September 2011, when it joined the FSA)	(Syria) Syrian Government

Commanders and leaders
Muhammad Issa (Syrian Liberation Army) Capt. Yusuf Yahya (Martyrs of Mount Zawiya Battalion and Lightning Battalion); Jamal Maarouf (Martyrs of Mount Zawiya Battalion); Lt. Alaa Hussein (Martyrs of Mount Zawiya Battalion); Ahmad Issa al-Sheikh (Suqour al-Sham Battalion); Hassan Aboud (David Battalion); Abdul Rahman al-Suri (Ahrar ash-Sham Brigades)	Maj. Gen. Fo'ad Hamoudeh; Brig. Gen. Ghassan Afif; Brig. Gen. Ghanem Ibrahim al-Hassan †

Units involved
(Syrian opposition) Free Syrian Army; (Syrian opposition) Syrian Liberation Army; (Syrian opposition) Martyrs of Mount Zawiya Battalion (Harmoush Battalion until December 2011); (Syrian opposition) Lightning Battalion; Suqour al-Sham Battalion; David Battalion	Syrian Armed Forces; Syrian Army; 1st Armoured Division; 76th Armoured Brigade; 5th Mechanized Division; 10th Mechanized Division; 85th Armoured Brigade; 11th Armoured Division; 15th Special Forces Division; 35th SF regiment; 41st SF regiment; 45th SF regiment; Syrian Air Force

Strength
(Syrian opposition) 25,000 fighters; 2,500 - 3,000 Al-Nusra fighters; (Syrian opposition) 2,000-3,000 fighters (Jabal al-Zawiya area); (Syrian opposition) 1,000 fighters (Idlib city)	9,000 soldiers 250 tanks

Casualties and losses
806 opposition fighters and defectors killed (opposition claims)	Unknown

The September 2011 – March 2012 Idlib Governorate clashes were the violent incidents that took place in Idlib Governorate, a province of Syria, from September 2011 and prior to the April 2012 Idlib Governorate Operation.

The Free Syrian Army had been targeting Syrian Army military patrols in the governorate since October 2011. Protests had still continued in this governorate, but they were often dispersed with gunfire by security forces. On 19 December, it became clear that "Army defectors have taken control over some towns and villages, almost as though they have created some sort of safe area, where protesters from other regions were seeking a safe haven and where defectors were able to operate from", and Syrian Army forces launched an offensive on one area, massacring a large number of civilians in one village. Hundreds of troops have been filmed after switching sides in one village in the province's countryside, prompting residents to hoist a flag of independence.

== Background ==
On 29 June, Syrian troops killed at least four civilians as army tanks and helicopters attacked a village in the northwestern province of Idlib, activists said, "The four died in random firing on the village of Rameh from tank machine guns, which has become customary in these unjustified assaults. The tanks started firing on surrounding woods then directed their fire on the village," Ammar Qarabi, president of the Syrian National Human Rights Organisation, told Reuters news agency from exile in Cairo.

On 2 July, Alarabiya reported of larger deployment of Syrian troops in the Idlib province, where some 16 civilians were killed on 1 July. Tanks were first reported to be moving toward Idlib city on 4 July, after massive anti-Government protests took place at the province. Yet, nightly protests still continued despite the siege.

== Armed clashes ==
=== September 2011 ===
On 8 September, Security forces abducted the 74-year-old brother of army defector Lieutenant Colonel Hussein Harmoush, one of the first defecting officers. Muhammad Harmoush was abducted and his body was later returned to his family when the soldiers raided his home in the village of Ibleen. It was also reported that three military defectors were killed in the raid and SANA, Syrian state television, reported that six of their soldiers were killed in the operation.

On 29 September, the Harmoush Battalion of the Free Syrian Army claimed responsibility for an attack on security forces in the Jabal Zawiya area, killing a number of security personnel.

=== October 2011 ===
Around 5 October, security forces raided villages close to the Turkish border, five villagers and seven soldiers were said to have died in clashes there.

Suspected deserters killed eight soldiers in simultaneous attacks on three army posts in the northern province of Idlib on 10 October.

One of the first reported engagements in the Province was on 18 October, when "Gunmen suspected of being army defectors blew up a bomb by remote control as an army vehicle passed by Ehssem in the countryside of the (northwestern province of Idlib), killing an officer and three soldiers, and wounding others," said the Syrian Observatory for Human Rights (S.O.H.R.)

On 25 October, army defectors who defected during a military assault in the central province of Homs gathered and launched an assault on a road block, where many armored vehicles were said to have parked. The battle took place on the edge of Maarat al-Numaan, up to ten security agents were killed with an unknown number of defector casualties.

One of the earliest engagements in the province was on 30 October 2011, when a transporting security agents between the villages of al-Habit and Kafr Nabudah in Idlib province, close to the Turkish border was attacked "by armed men, probably deserters", the resulting battle leaving 10 security agents and one deserter dead.

=== November 2011 ===
Five soldiers were killed in ambushes near Maarat al-Numaan on 10 November.

The Free Syrian Army (FSA), operated on 26 November 2011, when they killed eight regular Syrian Army soldiers and members of the security forces and wounded 40 more in an attack in Idlib in northwest Syria. The Syrian Observatory for Human Rights said:

A group of deserters attacked a squad of soldiers and security agents in a convoy of seven vehicles, including three all-terrain vehicles, on the road from Ghadka to Maaret Numan.

The Britain-based watchdog said:

Eight were killed and at least 40 more were wounded. The deserters were able to withdraw without suffering any casualties.

The Free Syrian Army said in a statement it was behind the attack.

On 27 November, a person was killed in the Kafr Nabl area of Idlib province in the northwest after being arrested by security forces "for selling fuel to militants," the Syrian observatory for human rights claimed.

On 29 November, the FSA launched an attack that killed three government soldiers and captured two others, and then government forces later shot dead a civilian.

At least six anti-government demonstrators were shot dead when security forces broke up an anti-government demonstration in the city of Idlib on 30 November. "They have not blocked protests in Idlib for weeks. Today they fired at a crowd thousands who were marching from a roundabout to the main Mohafaza Square," said Fares, an activist.

=== December 2011 ===
On 1 December, FSA troops launched a raid on an intelligence building in Idlib, leading to a three-hour fire fight in which eight loyalists were killed.

On 3 December, seven members of the security forces, five army rebels and three civilians were killed in a three-hour night-time battle in Idlib, according to the Syrian Observatory for Human Rights.

On 5 December, at least a dozen Syrian secret police defected from an intelligence compound, in what appeared to be the first major desertion from a service that acted as a pillar of President Assad's rule. A gunfight then broke out overnight after the defectors fled the Airforce Intelligence complex in the center of Idlib city, northwest of Damascus. Ten people were killed or wounded on both sides, the activists said, according to Reuters.

On 8 December, in Idlib, military forces raided houses and arrested three militants, in the vicinity of Saraqib, while some 50 armoured vehicles, including tanks and troop carriers, came under attack in the village of al-Rami. On the same day, three more protesters were killed in Idlib by security forces, as well as Mohammad Amin Subhi al-Najjar, an army defector from Aleppo, was also killed.

On 10 December, Syrian security forces shot and killed four civilians, when they opened fire with live ammunition and tear gas on mourners in the northwest, a human rights group reported. "Four civilians were killed on Saturday after shots and tear gas were fired during the funeral of a child who was killed last night (Friday) in the city of Maaret Numan" in the northwestern province of Idlib, said the Syrian Observatory for Human Rights. According to Syrian state media, three rebels died planting a bomb and were buried in a park. This could not be verified.

On 12 December two protesters and five soldiers were reported killed.

On 13 December, violence flared in the province. Firstly, the UK-based Syrian Observatory for Human Rights reported that army defectors in Idlib's Bab al-Hawa road killed seven members of Syria's security forces in retaliation for an attack that cost the lives of 11 civilians. On the same day, five more civilians were shot dead by security forces while official Syrian state media SANA stated that armed terrorists.

On 19 December, the FSA suffered its largest loss of life when new defectors tried to abandon their positions and bases between the villages of Kansafra and Kafr Oweid in Idlib province. Activist groups, specifically the Syrian Observatory for Human rights, reported that 72 defectors were killed as they were gunned down during their attempted escape. The Syrian Army lost three soldiers during the clashes. The next day, S.O.H.R. stated that in all 100 defectors were killed or wounded. Also, the same day, the Syrian Observatory for human rights reported the killing by government security forces of at least 111 civilians in the province. It had been called a "massacre", 37 civilians had also been killed the previous day.

Alaa El Din Al Youssef, a Syrian opposition member in Idlib, described the government's attack on the area of Idlib and Jabal al-Zawiya as a massacre.

"Civilians were surrounded by security forces who killed 100 of us. The corpses of those killed were left in the streets and the mosques and we are not allowed to bury any of them."

"Some of those killed cannot be recognised. Some were burnt and some beheaded with their hands tied. We are really scared because the area might be stormed once again."

The clashes continued into the next day, and another report, by Lebanese human rights activist Wissam Tarif, put the death toll even higher with 163 defectors, 97 government troops and nine civilians killed on the second day alone as the military tracked down the soldiers and civilian that managed to initially escape. On 21 December, it was reported that the FSA had taken control over large swathes of Idlib province including some towns and villages.

On 30 December, more than 250,000 anti-government protesters took to the streets in the province of Idlib.

=== January 2012 ===
Army defectors captured dozens of members of the security forces by seizing two checkpoints in the new year on 2 January, the opposition said. Army defectors also clashed with security forces at a third checkpoint, killing and wounding an unspecified number of troops loyal to Assad, opposition activists said.

On 3 January the SANA (Syrian state news) claimed gunmen had shot dead a police officer at al-Khudra market, Idlib.

On 6 January, SANA claimed that a policeman was killed while on patrol in the Idlib area.

On 12 January SANA claimed that eight security forces were killed in an attack on their bus near Jbala crossroads, 5 km north of Khan Shaykhun.

On 17 January accord to claims made by SANA, two policemen were shot dead outside Idlib central prison and the bodies of three soldiers and a contractor were found with bullet wounds in a graveyard.

On 19 January, Syrian security forces killed four leading pro-democracy activists in an ambush in northwestern Idlib province. The activists had gone into hiding with armed opponents of the Damascus government and were shot dead in the Zawiya hills close to the border with Turkey.

On 21 January 14 people were killed when a bus carrying prisoners was targeted by unknown gunmen. The vehicle was apparently targeted in Jisr al-Shughour area. The incident followed reports of heavy clashes between the army and defectors in Idlib. Opposition activists said nine regular troops were killed by defectors. Mohammad Fizzo, an activist on the Turkish side of the border, told Al Jazeera there were many injured on both sides. "A group of soldiers who defected were trying to escape to Turkey when the government forces raided the bordering villages of Ain al-Beida and Khirbet al-Joz using heavy weapons and mortars," he said. According to Al Jazeera, Idlib, the base of many defected soldiers, has become a stronghold of the armed opposition, which has been targeting army convoys to prevent them from regaining territory under the opposition's control. According to state media, two security forces were among the dead in the explosion on the prisoner bus.

Separately, the Syrian Observatory For Human Rights reported that a member of the security forces was killed in fighting between dissidents and soldiers at Kafr Nabl, in the Zawiya mountains of Idlib province, with troops using heavy machine guns. 60 People, including civilians were said to have been killed that day.

On 23 January, S.O.H.R. reported that FSA and security forces clashed in Idlib on the Damascus-Aleppo highway, near Maarrat al-Nu'man, where eight soldiers were reported killed, and three armoured cars destroyed.

On 24 January, two policemen were killed when rebels opened fire on their car at Khan Shaykhun.

On 25 January, the Syrian Arab Red Crescent, a humanitarian organization that provides medical aid and food to victims of the Syrian government's crackdown announced the death of their vice-president, Abdulrazak Jbeiro, saying he had been shot dead by security forces as he drove to Idlib. He was also the head official of Idlib governorate for the organization.

On 27 January, S.O.H.R reported that six members of the security forces were killed by a car bomb in the city of Idlib that targeted a security checkpoint, without providing any details on the identity of the assailants.

On 29 January it was said that ten members of the military died when their convoy was attacked at Kansafra in the Jabal al-Zawiya area. Eight others were killed in a separate attack in Idlib on the same day.

In late January 2012, a defected colonel told reporters that about 90 percent of the city of Idlib was under Free Syrian Army control.

=== February 2012 ===
By early February 2012, rebels controlled parts of Idlib city, but was preparing for an attack by the government. Sky news correspondent, Alex Crawford, was inside the city of Idlib posting a video with the opposition flag flying in the city centre. The video showed FSA fighters standing guard and "tens of thousands" of residents protesting against Bashar al-Assad, demanding him to step down from power. Activists and fighters reported that there were tanks moving outside the city.

On 4 February, S.O.H.R reported the deaths of at least 14 soldiers when their military convoy was attacked in Idlib province by rebel soldiers or deserters. Also, a police sergeant was killed and another two wounded in another rebel attacked. In the ensuing clashes, the security forces reported they killed several of the attackers.

On 5 February, S.O.H.R. reported that nine soldiers were killed and 21 were wounded in clashes with the FSA in three different locations in the Jebel Al-Zawiya area.

The following day, on 6 February, army deserters attacked and destroyed a military control post in the village of al-Bara, killing three officers and capturing 19 soldiers. The deserters involved suffered no reported casualties. On the same day in north Syria, a different group of rebels tried to take over a Syrian army checkpoint, but were unsuccessful. Four rebels were killed and the CBS journalist who filmed the assault said that most of these fighters in this assault had no military backgrounds and were farmers, teachers and factory workers not "terrorists" as the Syrian Government claimed.

On 10 February, S.O.H.R. reported that army defectors ambushed a patrol of soldiers between two villages in Idlib province. The defectors hit the patrol with hand grenades and roadside bombs. Ten soldiers reportedly died in the clash.

On 14 February, a Sky News reporter showed the funeral of a leading pro-democracy activist, a lawyer, after he was shot dead by a pro-government sniper hidden in a building. The correspondent reported that, despite opposition forces controlling the city of Idlib a few hidden snipers were still firing on civilians indiscriminately in the city. The same day, the Syrian Army opened a wide scale offensive on the city of Idlib. The fighting resulted in dozens killed, but the result was inconclusive.

On 15 February, it was reported that masses of defecting soldiers were concentrating in the city of Saraqib the previous day, with the city under de facto full control of the rebels.

On 16 February, CNN correspondent confirmed that for few a months villages and towns in northern Idlib province are effectively out of government control, govern by self-rule and protected by hundreds of FSA defectors. The same day, SANA reported that people attacked law enforcement forces personnel near the prison on Idlib killing five of them. Two First Lieutenant's were reportedly among the dead.

On 17 February, the SANA agency reported that a member of the security forces was killed and said "many others were wounded" in Idlib province.

On 22 February, the Syrian Army conducted a series of raids on the villages of Abdita, Iblin and Balshun, in the Jabal al-Zawiya area (northern Idlib Governorate), resulting in 33 civilians killed.

On 22 February 2012, the regular Syrian army was shaken by a large defection. Over 200 soldiers defected in Idlib, and a Brigadier General was reportedly among them. Opposition sources said that a battalion has been established in the city to fight government forces.

On 23 February 500 soldiers defected from the army and joined the FSA, forming a brigade in Idlib.

On 24 February, SANA reported that three soldiers were killed when an explosive device exploded in the Idlib province. Also, several rebels were reportedly killed when a bomb they were planting exploded prematurely and another four gunmen were killed by security forces in clashes in the province.

On 25 February, SANA reported the deaths of three soldiers in separate incidents, all around Idlib province. The same day Syrian Sham radio reported that 20 gunmen were killed in Saraqeb, and 7 others arrested by the Syrian army which seized their weapons.

On 27 February the Syrian army launched an attack on areas held by the rebels in the province, with the towns of Binnish and Sarmin being shelled by artillery while tanks entered the town of Maarrat al-Nu'man. Saraqib was also reportedly shelled by the government. It was reported that anti-aircraft fire was directed at Binnish, while a BBC correspondent said that the bombardment was entirely random, hitting civilian areas rather than targeting specific positions. Tanks entered the town of Sarmin, prompting a fight between the army and the rebels. A soldier was killed by an IED.

=== March 2012 ===
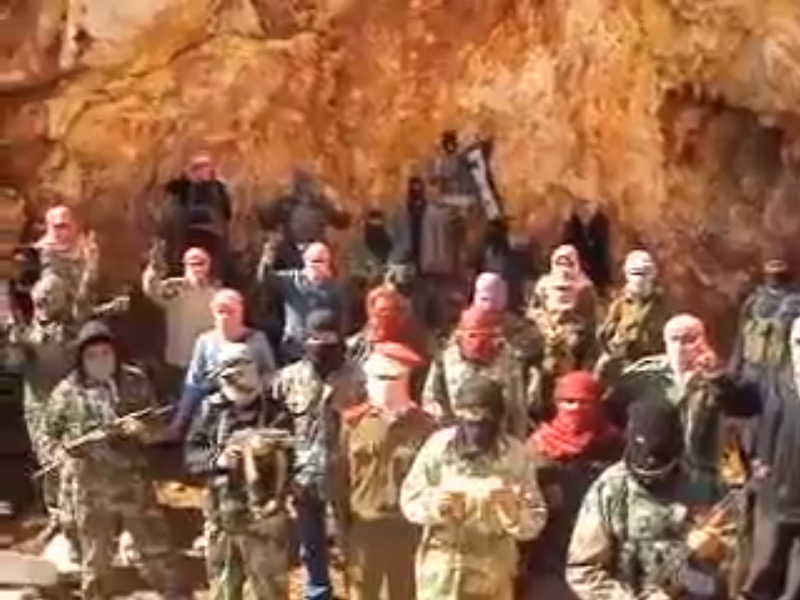
The Mujahideen Battalion, a unit of the Free Syrian Army, announces its formation in Jisr al-Shughur, March 2012.

The Syrian Army overran the village of Ain al-Beida which is a few kilometers from the Turkish border. Witnesses said that 2,000 soldiers and 15 tanks were involved in the assault and that injured opposition fighters were being treated in Turkey. According to Syrian state media, three rebels died planting a bomb and were buried in a park; this couldn't be verified.

On 3 March 47 soldiers were executed when allegedly trying to defect. Activists said 50 soldiers from a unit in Abu al-Thuhur Military Airport attempted to defect but a captain loyal to the government informed a general of the plan, and only three of the soldiers managed to escape. The Syrian network for human rights demanded "an immediate international investigation for this massacre." The network said bodies of the dead were thrown into a lake. The Syrian Network for Human Rights gave a different death toll, saying that 44 soldiers had been killed and 6 had managed to escape the massacre.

On 7 March, the village of Kabani was overran by the Army, with a villager reporting three helicopters, gunships and infantry involved in the attack.

On 8 March, a captain was killed in Idlib and 11 police students were abducted, according to Syrian government claims.

The Syrian Army stormed a village in Jabal al-Zawiya after surrounding the district.

16 rebels were killed in an ambush when they were heading for the city of Idlib to fight the army, and in another clash, four soldiers were killed and five abducted in the same province, the London-based activist group reported. The same day, the Battle of Idlib began. It was also reported that seven soldiers had died in the main battle in Idlib. The rebel death toll was later updated, with AFP stating that 22 rebels were killed in Idlib Province out of the 39 killed in the whole of Syria on 10 March.

On 11 March, the head of the same activist group told that the army seized the city of Idlib and that eight soldiers were killed in the province. The army was preparing an assault in the rural areas of the province. Later reports stated only parts of the city were in control of the army. 12 rebels were also reportedly killed during the day.

Around ten Syrian troops were killed by FSA fighters in an ambush on a checkpoint in the Idlib area about 13 March. Fighters also captured a tank from the army.

On the morning of 14 March, opposition activists reported that the Army had captured most of Idlib, with only small pockets of FSA resistance remaining in the city. It was later reported by one source that the last resisting rebels flew Idlib and that the city was under full control of the army, with no more fighting reported. However, Syrian army's tanks and artillery units continued to shell some areas in and around the city, the second day of heavy barrages, to flush out the last remaining hold-outs of anti-government resistance which remained entrenched.

On 16 March, three soldiers died in the town of Ma'arrat an-Nu'man in fighting with army defectors, according to the Syrian Observatory for Human Rights. Three rebels were also killed by the authorities.

On 23 March, two soldiers were killed and 18 captured, including two officers, when the Free Syrian Army attacked the army unit near the border with Turkey. The FSA seized large quantities of ammunition.

On 24 March, according to state media, an army engineer was killed when a bridge under him was blown up by remote control.

On 28 March, government loyalists attacked Saraqib, reportedly killing 21 local residents. Army defectors attacked two security posts in Idlib Province, killing 13 soldiers. Also on 28 March, it was reported that two British journalists of Algerian descent, Nassim Terreri and Walid Bledi, were killed by the pro-government militia Shabiha. Details emerged on a third journalist being injured in the shoulder and driven to Turkey for treatment. The freelance journalists were on the border with Turkey in Idlib province and were filming a documentary about refugees fleeing the violence. The committee to protect journalists, or CJP, interviewed local witnesses who said that the two journalists initially escaped the targeted shooting in the town of Darkush, but were killed when they went back to retrieve equipment after the shooting had stopped. A witness said that the army later took the journalists' bodies away. Mohamed Abdel Dayem, CPJ's Middle East and north Africa programme coordinator said the deaths were "yet another illustration of the grave dangers that journalists face in reporting a conflict that the Syrian government has sought to hide from the world."

== Aftermath ==
=== Early April 2012 ===
At least four soldiers were reported to have been killed in an ambush near Jisr al-Shughur by army deserters on 1 April. Also, rebels in Sarmin said that home-made bombs to protect the village had killed a dozen soldiers and destroyed five tanks when they tried to enter, although this claim was unverified.

On 3 April, an armed man trying to infiltrate Syria from Turkey was killed, Syrian press agency announced.

On 5 April, heavy fighting took place on the outskirts of the town of Taftanaz, where five civilians, four rebels and seven soldiers were killed amid heavy machine gun fire and shelling according to Syrian Observatory for Human Rights. Meanwhile, six soldiers and eight civilians were reportedly killed elsewhere in Idlib province. Later, it was confirmed that the military captured Taftanaz's city center, which was defended by 200 FSA fighters, after a two-hour battle, following which the Army reportedly rounded up and executed 82 people. It was unknown how many were opposition fighters and how many were civilians.

On 8 April, the Syrian Army clashed with an armed group, killing at least two of its members and capturing another rebel.

On 9 April, after six soldiers were killed when a checkpoint was attacked, the military fired across the border into a refugee camp in Turkey, provoking international condemnation. According to S.O.H.R, the incident began before dawn when rebel fighters attacked Syrian soldiers manning a checkpoint near the Turkish border, killing six soldiers. The soldiers then kept firing as eight wounded rebels escaped to the camp just across the border in Turkey, sending bullets whizzing across the frontier into the camp, he said. According to the Observatory, the shooting wounded five people in the camp. The Observatory reported that two people later died of their injuries, but that could not be immediately confirmed. The wounded were three Syrian refugees, one Turkish policeman and a Turkish translator. Turkish military didn't fire back but called for an immediate halt to the gunfire.

The Syrian authorities reported massive defections and surrenders in the rebel ranks. For the Idlib governorate, they reported that 695 armed men surrendered with their weapons in the previous two months, after the beginning of the offensive of the Syrian Army in the governorate.

=== During ceasefire ===
==== Late April 2012 ====
A ceasefire was declared across Syria by the government on 14 April, following implementation of the Kofi Annan peace plan for Syria. Incidents continued in several locations, most notably in the Idlib governorate.

On 15 April, SANA stated that one member of the security forces was killed and three wounded when ambushed by the opposition in Idlib province.

On 18 April, SANA reported that six members of the security forces were killed in a blast in Idlib province.

On 28 April, a firefight in a village in Idlib province killed two soldiers and wounded another officer, according to government media.

==== May 2012 ====
A Der Spiegel journalist, reporting from the Idlib countryside, reported that villages in the governorate were no longer under government control, but in many villages the army had attacked them and then left. Many defectors from the army had gone back to their native villages to protect them. Village councils everywhere are hard at work attending to electricity needs, maintaining the water supply and upholding the rule of law. Committees organize supplies of gasoline and food, as well as transporting the injured to nearby Turkey, according to the journalist. He reported that Sarmin and other places had been taken over with tanks and helicopters, but the military usually pull out after a couple of days.

On 2 May, according to state media, armed men attacked a patrol of security forces, killing two and wounding six.

On 5 May, two army officers were reported to have been killed.

On 9 May, one soldier was killed in a village in Idlib province.

On 12 May, nine soldiers and an army deserter were killed, according to the S.O.H.R. network, in a series of battles throughout Idlib Province.

On 13 May, violent clashes raged between Syrian Army forces and armed military defectors in a village near Idlib, according to S.O.H.R, and four soldiers were reported to have been killed. During the day, security forces in Idlib city killed a man and a woman when they raided houses. Also, seven other soldiers, including a first lieutenant were killed when a bomb exploded near their bus; it was then fired upon in the same village.

In the Idlib mountains, where they enjoy overwhelming public support, the FSA was reported to have been forming a "fledgling state", comparing it to Libya's Benghazi and planning a future "free zone". Many FSA checkpoints had been set up around villages and, co-ordinating with radios, searched passing vehicles for weapons and government forces. However, government military tanks were still holding positions at various points such as banks and one man said that he thought the secret police were around but hiding.
