= December 2011 Syrian–Turkish border clash =

Unsuccessful attempt by armed men to infiltrate into Syria from Turkey

2011-2012 Syrian-Turkish border clashes
- Part of Idlib Governorate clashes (September 2011–March 2012)
Date	December 5–12, 2011 (1 week)
Location	Syrian-Turkish border
Result	SAR victory, all infiltrators repelled

Belligerents
(Syria) Syrian Arab Republic: Syrian Armed Forces	(Syrian opposition) Free Syrian Army

Strength
Border patrols units	35 first attempt 15 second attempt

Casualties and losses
None	3 killed several wounded 1 arrested

The December 2011 Syrian-Turkey border clash was an ineffective incursion from Turkey by armed men into Syria.

During the night of 5 December, about 35 armed fighters attempted an ineffective incursion from Turkey of Syria and were engaged immediately by the Syrian border forces who wounded several the fighters and were able to repel them into Turkey.

Once they were back on Turkish soil, the Turkish army picked them up in trucks and took care of the injured fighters.

A further attempt happened, as during the night of 12 December, 15 infiltrators tried again to cross the borders. They were unsuccessful and two of them were killed by Syrian border patrols.

Because of this, the pro-government Syrian news agency, SANA, stated that the Free Syrian Army staged a retaliation attack and shot and killed a senior officer, Brigadier General Ghanem Ibrahim al-Hassan.

On 1 February, Syrian authorities announced that they prevented another infiltration attempt from Turkey, in the Idlib Province. One infiltrator was killed and another arrested while the others fled. On 10 March a new group ineffectively infiltrated Syria with several infiltrators killed or arrested by the army.
