= Battle of Idlib (2012) =

Battle

Coordinates: 35.9297°N 36.6317°E

- Part of the Idlib Governorate clashes (September 2011–March 2012) and the Early insurgency phase of the Syrian Civil War
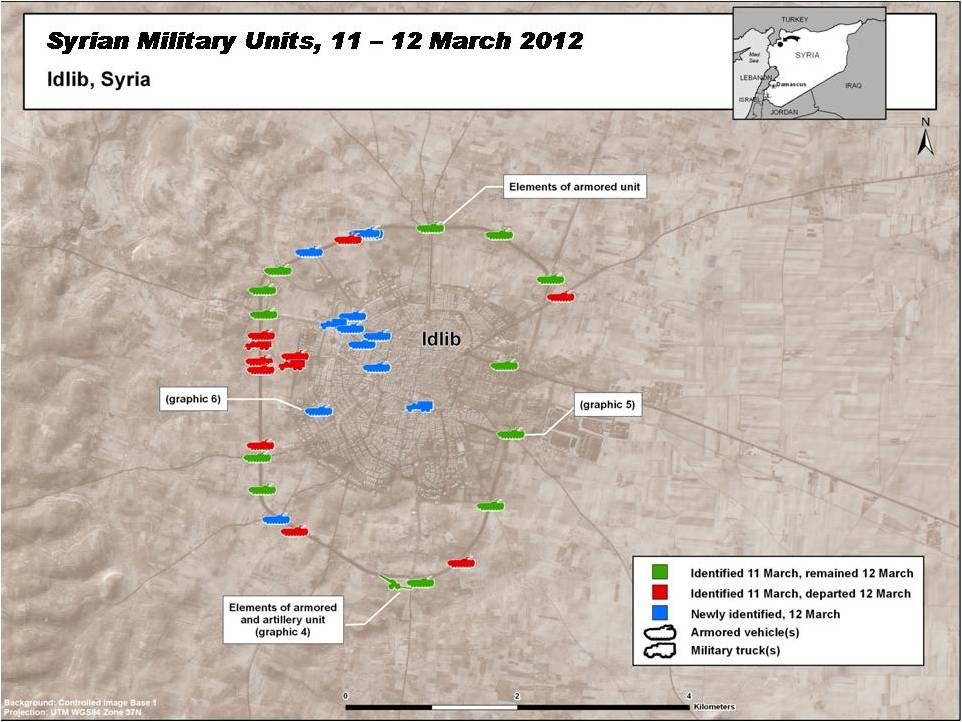
- Additional armored and artillery units arrived outside of Idlib by 11 March and began deploying into the city by 12 March 2012.
Date	10–13 March 2012 (3 days)
Location	Idlib city, Idlib Governorate, Syria
Result	Syrian government victory
Territorial changes	Syrian government forces regain control over Idlib

Belligerents
Syrian Opposition; (Syrian opposition) Free Syrian Army; Kata’ib Ahrar Al-Sham	(Syria) Syrian Government

Commanders and leaders
Abdul-Rahman al-Souri (Ahrar ash-Sham)	Unknown

Units involved
(Syrian opposition) Free Syrian Army; (Syrian opposition) Syrian Liberation Army	Syrian Armed Forces; Syrian Arab Army; 12th Armoured Brigade; 45th Army Regiment

Strength
(Syrian opposition) 1,000–1,300 fighters (Syrian opposition) 2 tanks (opposition claim)	1,200 soldiers 42 tanks

Casualties and losses
(Syrian opposition) 36–52 fighters killed	7 soldiers killed
- 100+ killed in total

The Battle of Idlib was fought in the city of Idlib, located in northwestern Syria, starting on 10 March 2012. The battle took place in a province considered a stronghold of the armed opposition to the Syrian government and was fought in the wider context of the Syrian Army trying to retake several rebel strongholds. After three days of fighting, the Syrian Army recaptured the city.

== Background ==
Prior to the battle, there were months of clashes around Idlib which had seen the rebels taking over the city.

As early as 12 February, it was reported that the opposition forces within the city of Idlib were making preparations for the "inevitable attack" by Syrian Army troops.

The Syrian Revolution General Commission reported that 54 people were killed by security forces gunfire across Syria on 15 February, with most of the deaths in Idlib. The LCC put the number of deaths in Idlib at 11. Chinese media reported photos of Idlib residents escaping a tank attack on the city.

On 16 February, Russian sources reported that several of the Idlib neighbourhoods fell under the control of armed groups who were looting government buildings and private offices. The LCC reported that a massacre took place in the city, with 38 people killed, most in the Al-Muhameel neighborhood, allegedly executed by Syrian Army. Heavy tank fire was also reported in the area. Several days later, FSA gunmen killed a state prosecutor and a judge.

The week before the battle, there was a military buildup and reinforcements were prepared for the assault. On 9 March, a column of 42 tanks and 131 troop carriers headed towards the city.

== The battle ==
=== Initial shelling ===
On the morning of 10 March, the Syrian army started the offensive by heavily shelling the city with artillery, mortar and tanks. Later, infantry backed by tanks began to move into Idlib from the southeast. Witnesses described a shell landing every two minutes in the city, with no definite targets. The rebels were unable to fight back the shelling of the city which lasted until the night with a lull at midday.

=== The ground assault ===
After the end of the shelling, the army stormed the city with troops carriers and fierce clashes subsequently occurred. On the first day of fighting, the London-based Syrian Observatory for Human Rights (SOHR) reported that 14 civilians were killed and that 150 people had been arrested and shortly after executed by the army. Other reported deaths for the first day of the assault were 23 rebels fighters killed in an ambush by forces loyal to Assad as they were coming to help their fellow fighters in Idlib, while four pro-Assad soldiers were killed elsewhere in the city. The commander of the Free Syria Army based in Turkey and an activist said that his soldiers had managed to hit one helicopter and destroy six tanks during the battle. He also stated that 30 soldiers had defected during the fighting, and had defected with 2 tanks.

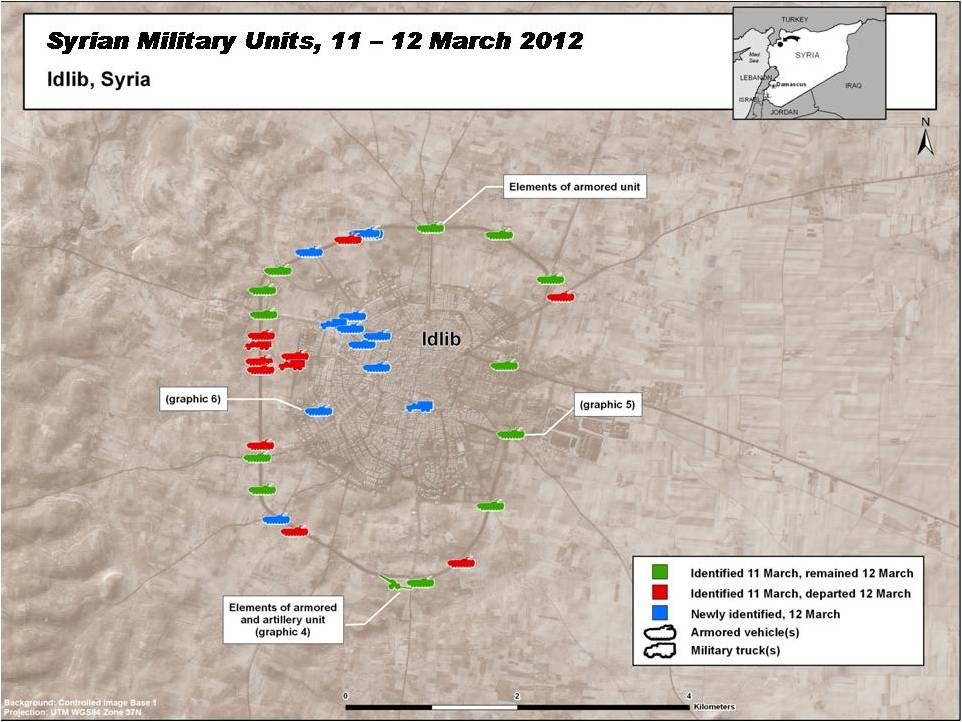
Additional armored and artillery units arrived outside of Idlib by 11 March and began deploying into the city by 12 March

An activist estimated the death toll of the first day was at least 20 killed based on casualties brought to a hospital in the city. The Syrian Observatory for Human Rights said that 16 rebels and seven soldiers had been killed in Idlib. Syrian media gave the figures of 14 rebels killed and no military casualties. Al Jazeera reported that the main hospital was taken by the Syrian Army and the rebels reported to a journalist that they thought it was just a matter of time before the city would be retaken by the government. A resident of the city told Al Jazeera that many people fled the city and that snipers were everywhere. He added that the government troops were conducting house to house searches to arrest opposition members and talked about looting taking place in the city.

More than 30 dead were brought to the same hospital on the second day of fighting. The hospital could not cope with the number of people injured, and the park used to bury the people killed in the battle rapidly became full. About half of the people killed were civilians, who suffered mainly from the shelling.

Al Jazeera reported on the third day of fighting that Syrian Army soldiers were still randomly shelling the town and snipers were causing increasing civilian casualties. An Al Jazeera correspondent inside Idlib filed a video report, showing that most of the fighters in the town were locals, trying to defend their families. It was said in the report that the artillery was not just targeting opposition fighters, but was rather randomly hitting the town. The reporter showed pieces of shells that had hit the town.

An activist said the soldiers from the Syrian Army had been granted complete freedom to loot everything from people's homes and shops. An opposition activist said that the Army took control of parts of the city. It was reported by residents that the Army was burning the houses of known activists, one resident claimed that 30 houses were burned in total. Activists who described the situation said many residents had left Idlib but that 85% of the population still remained in the city.

Both a pro-government newspaper and the opposition group SOHR reported on 13 March that the Syrian Army took control of the city, with slight resistance to mop-up operations in three districts. This was confirmed the next morning, when opposition activists reported that the army had captured most of Idlib, with only small pockets of FSA resistance remaining in the city. An opposition spokesman announced that the rebels withdrew from the city after being outgunned, which was later confirmed by sources close to Al Jazeera. One source reported that the last rebels resisting had left Idlib and that the city was under full control of the army, with no more fighting reported. However, Syrian army tanks and artillery units continued to shell some areas in and around the city, the second day of heavy barrages, to flush out the last remaining hold-outs of anti-government resistance which remained entrenched. By the end of the day the AFP, Associated Press, Al Jazeera and Al Arabiya had also reported that the city was recaptured by the Syrian Army.

After the battle, the Free Syrian Army fled to Binnish after retreating from Idlib. Two Turkish journalists went missing in the battle. Survivors of the Free Syrian Army told their story, one of them saying that the soldiers had rolled over eight dead bodies with armored vehicles. He added that a shell struck his group killing 3 fighters and wounding 2 others. Another survivor said that 16 fighters of his group of 20 were killed in the battle to defend the city. Since its recapture the city has been sealed off by security forces searching for any suspected rebels with hundreds of FSA soldiers having fled to Turkey.

== Aftermath ==
The April 2012 Idlib Governorate Operation was initiated by the Syrian government, in order to make gains against the rebels, prior to the implementation of the U.N. brokered ceasefire, planned for 10 April. The ceasefire was officially announced by the Syrian government on 14 April.

On 16 April, renewed fighting was reported in Idlib city. This fighting came after the Syrian army in Idlib reportedly killed 26 civilians. Two days later, despite a ceasefire organized by the UN, the Syrian army shelled parts of the city, due to a continuing presence of opposition fighters in those areas. Activists in Idlib claimed that many people had been killed in the fighting, although the claims could not be independently verified.

== See also ==
- 2012 Homs offensive
- Battle of Rastan (May 2012)
- Battle of Idlib (2015)
