= Abu al-Duhur =

Abu al-Duhur أَبُو الظُّهُور Abu al-Ẓuhur Abu al-Thuhur
- Town
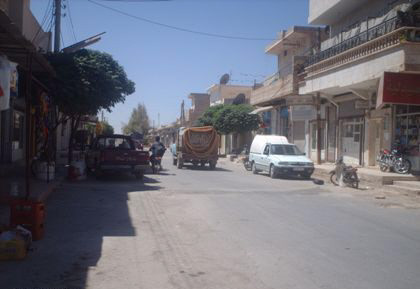
- Street scene in Abu al-Duhur, 2014

- Location in Syria
- Coordinates: 35°44′26″N 37°2′48″E
- Country: Syria
- Governorate: Idlib
- District: Idlib
- Subdistrict: Abu al-Duhur
- Control: (Syria) Syrian transitional government

Population (2004)
  - Total: 10,694

Abu al-Duhur (Arabic: أَبُو الظُّهُور; ʾAbū aẓ-Ẓuhūr, also spelled Abu al-Thuhur) is a town in northwestern Syria on the edge of the Syrian Desert, administratively part of the Idlib Governorate, located about 45 kilometers south of Aleppo. Nearby localities include Tell Sultan and Tell Kalbah to the northwest. According to the Syria Central Bureau of Statistics (CBS), Abu al-Duhur had a population of 10,694 in the 2004 census. It is the center of a nahiyah ("subdistrict") containing 26 localities with a combined population of 38,869 in 2004.

Abu al-Duhur is the site of the Abu al-Duhur Military Airbase. During the Syrian Civil War it was fought over in the siege of Abu al-Duhur Airbase. The city was captured by opposition forces in 2012.

On 22 January 2018, the Syrian Army entered the town, before fully capturing it on the 29th. On 30 November 2024, HTS rebels captured the city from the Syrian Army.
