= Mardikh =

Mardikh مرديخ
- Village
- Location in Syria
- Coordinates: 35°52′N 36°48′E
- Country: Syria
- Governorate: Idlib
- District: Idlib
- Subdistrict: Saraqib

Area
  - Total: 12.21 km^{2} (4.71 sq mi)
- Elevation: 409 m (1,342 ft)

Population (2004)
  - Total: 2,918
- Time zone: UTC+2 (EET)
  - Summer (DST): UTC+3 (EEST)

Mardikh (Arabic: مرديخ) (Mardhuk in Sanskrit) is a village in the Idlib Governorate of Syria. It is the nearest village to the site of historical Ebla ("Tel Mardikh"), south east of Idlib. Nearby localities include Saraqib to the north, Kafr Amim to the east, Maardabsah and Khan al-Sabl to the south and Dadikh to the west. According to the Syria Central Bureau of Statistics (CBS), Mardikh had a population of 2,918 in the 2004 census.
