= Babilla, Idlib =

Babilla, Idlib بابيلا
- Village
- Location in Syria
- Coordinates: 35°42′4″N 36°43′51″E
- Country: Syria
- Governorate: Idlib
- District: Maarrat al-Nu'man District
- Subdistrict: Maarrat al-Nu'man Nahiyah
- Occupation: Jaish al-Fatah

Population (2004)
  - Total: 5,000
- Time zone: UTC+2 (EET)
  - Summer (DST): UTC+3 (EEST)
- City Qrya Pcode: C3964

Babilla, Idlib (Arabic: بابيلا) is a Syrian village located in Maarrat al-Nu'man Nahiyah in Maarrat al-Nu'man District, Idlib. According to the Syria Central Bureau of Statistics (CBS), Babilla, Idlib had a population of 2536 in the 2004 census. The population was reported to be 2,433 in January of 2018. In 2019 a medical center in Babilla was one of four centers in Idlib that received dialysis equipment as part of a project funded by the World Health Organization, with a fifth center in Darat Izza in western rural Aleppo.
