= Al-Assad Military Academy =

Coordinates: 36°10′53″N 37°5′40″E

- Type: Military academy
- Active: 1979–2024
- Location: Aleppo, Aleppo Governorate, Syria

Al-Assad Military Academy (Arabic: أكاديمية الأسد للهندسة العسكرية), also known as the Academy of Military Engineering, was a military educational and training institution in Aleppo, Syria. The academy was located 7 kilometres (4.3 mi) west-southwest of the center of Aleppo. The square-kilometer campus held 2,000 or so well-armed soldiers.

The academy was founded in 1979 during the rule of Hafez al-Assad, then upgraded to grant Master's and PhD degrees in 2014. It provided basic training for infantry and armored corps conscripts and advanced training for army engineers. It suspended its operation after the fall of the Assad regime in 2024.
