= Tronba =

Tronba ترنبة
- Village
- Location in Syria
- Coordinates: 35°51′38″N 36°46′7″E
- Country: Syria
- Governorate: Idlib
- District: Idlib District
- Subdistrict: Saraqib Nahiyah

Population (2004)
  - Total: 3,623
- Time zone: UTC+2 (EET)
  - Summer (DST): UTC+3 (EEST)
- City Qrya Pcode: C3908

Tronba (Arabic: ترنبة) is a Syrian village located in Saraqib Nahiyah in Idlib District, Idlib. According to the Syria Central Bureau of Statistics (CBS), Tronba had a population of 3623 in the 2004 census.

As part of the Idlib Governorate, it was under the control of the Syrian opposition, including Jabhat Fateh al-Sham and Tahrir al-Sham. It fell to the regime in the Northwestern Syria offensives in early February 2020, and was later established as the closest point of the control of the Syrian regime to the city of Idlib, until being recaptured in the Operation Deterrence of Aggression on 29 November 2024.
