= Jazraya =

Jazraya جزرايا
- Village
- Location within Syria
- Coordinates: 35°51′29″N 36°58′51″E
- Country: Syria
- Governorate: Aleppo
- District: Mount Simeon
- Subdistrict: Mount Simeon

Population (2004 census)
  - Total: 4,943
- Time zone: UTC+2 (EET)
  - Summer (DST): UTC+3 (EEST)

Jazraya (Arabic: جزرايا; also transliterated Jazraaya), is a village in northern Syria, administratively part of the Mount Simeon District of the Aleppo Governorate. According to the Syria Central Bureau of Statistics (CBS), Jazraya had a population of 4,943 in the 2004 census.

== History ==
Modern Jazraya was settled by Arab tribesmen of the Al Bu-Layl, a branch of the Uqaydat Bedouins of the Euphrates valley, in the late 19th century. The tribesmen entered the area around 1860 as pastoralists and shepherds but settled down in Jazraya and several nearby villages as farmers, likely during the last thirty years of the 19th century.

Around 1890, the sheikh of Jazraya, Hajj Mustafa al-Shwatiyya, established himself as the paramount leader of the Al Bu-Layl with the support of the Ottoman authorities. He retained his prestige among the sheikhs of the region when the Ottomans were driven from Syria in 1918 followed by the establishment of French Mandatory rule in the years after. His sons continued to be significant landowners in the village, at least up to the mid-20th century in post-independent Syria (post-1946).

== Bibliography ==
- Sweet, Louise (1960). Tell Toqaan, A Syrian Village. The Regents of the University of Michigan, The Museum of Anthropology. ISBN 978-0-932206-20-6.
