= April 2012 Idlib Governorate Operation =

Organized assault by Syrian Army in Idlib province prior to UN brokered cease-fire

- Part of Early insurgency phase of the Syrian civil war and the Idlib insurgency
Date	31 March – 14 April 2012 (2 weeks)
Location	Idlib Governorate, Syria
Result	Syrian Army victory
Territorial changes	The Syrian Army retakes Sarmin, Zardana and Taftanaz

Belligerents
Syrian opposition	(Syria) Syrian government

Units involved
(Syrian opposition) Free Syrian Army; (Syrian opposition) Idlib Martyrs' Brigade	Syrian Armed Forces; Syrian Army; 1st Armoured Division; 76th Armoured Brigade; 84th Armoured Brigade; Syrian Air Force

Strength
(Syrian opposition) 400 fighters	1,000 soldiers 90 tanks

Casualties and losses
(Syrian opposition) 100+ fighters and opposition supporters killed (number includes civilians)	58 soldiers killed At least 5 tanks destroyed or damaged

The April 2012 Idlib Governorate Operation was initiated by the Syrian Ba'athist government, in order to make gains against the rebels, prior to the implementation of the U.N. brokered ceasefire, planned for 10 April 2012. The ceasefire was officially announced by the Syrian Ba'athist government and other sides on 14 April 2012.

== Background ==
Throughout the Syrian civil war, Binnish had been a major protest hub. It had been captured by the FSA. The Syrian Army later assaulted Idlib city in March 2012 in a major operation. As early as March 23, it was reported that Binnish was one of their next targets. Binnish is located on a hill, so it is harder to assault. The Syrian Army had agreed to Kofi Annan's peace plan and to withdraw troops by April 10.

== April Operation ==
On April 1, it was reported that the FSA was outgunned, so they were making homemade bombs to defend themselves.

By April 3, the Syrian Army had retaken Sarmin. CNN reported they were assaulting Binnish, Taoum, Sarmin, and Taftanaz with tanks and helicopters.

On April 4, the Syrian Army was still shelling Binnish and Taftanaz. Citizens were reported to be fleeing Binnish, but could not flee Taftanaz because it was surrounded by the Syrian Army. 20 people were reported killed in Taftanaz.

On April 5, the Syrian Army announced a pause in fighting in Taftanaz for residents to collect the dead. Imagery released by U.S. Ambassador Robert Ford showed that the Army withdrew from Taftanaz after taking it, then took the nearby town of Zardana.

On April 6, the Syrian Army started shelling the village of Killi.

By April 7, it was reported at least 100 people had been killed in Taftanaz and Killi.

On April 8, the Syrian Army, with about 90 tanks backed by helicopters, assaulted the al-Rouge plain with the FSA being surrounded and shelled in the village al-Bashiriyah in the plain.

On April 12, Khirbet al-Joz was reported to have been taken by the Syrian Army after two hours of clashes.

On April 13, though, it was reported the FSA still held Khirbet al-Joz and shelling was ongoing.
