= Maar Dibsah =

Maar Dibsah معر دبسة
- Village
- Location in Syria
- Coordinates: 35°46′44″N 36°46′11″E
- Country: Syria
- Governorate: Idlib
- District: Idlib District
- Subdistrict: Saraqib Nahiyah

Population (2004)
  - Total: 7,074
- Time zone: UTC+2 (EET)
  - Summer (DST): UTC+3 (EEST)
- City Qrya Pcode: C3931

Maar Dibsah (Arabic: معر دبسة, also spelled Maardabsa) is a Syrian village located in Saraqib Nahiyah in Idlib District, Idlib. According to the Syria Central Bureau of Statistics (CBS), Maar Dibsah had a population of 7,074 in the 2004 census.

== Syrian Civil War ==
On 6 September 2016, 8 people were killed when the village was shelled.
