= Saraqib =

Saraqib سَرَاقِب Saraqeb
- City
- Location in Syria
- Coordinates: 35°51′49″N 36°48′2″E
- Country: Syria
- Governorate: Idlib
- District: Idlib
- Subdistrict: Saraqib
- Elevation: 370 m (1,210 ft)

Population (2012)
  - Total: 34,231

Saraqib (Arabic: سَرَاقِب, romanized: Sarāqib also spelled Saraqeb) is a city in northwestern Syria, administratively belonging to the Idlib Governorate, located east of Idlib. During the course of the Syrian Civil War, the city fell to rebel forces in 2012 and was recaptured by the Syrian Army in 2020. The city was captured by the Syrian Salvation Government during the 2024 Northwestern Syria offensive.

It has an elevation of 370 meters above sea level. The ancient site of Ebla is situated five kilometers south of the city. Nearby localities include Mardikh and Maar Dibsah to the south, Tronba and al-Nayrab to the west, Sarmin to the northwest, Taftanaz to the north, Talhiyah to the northeast, Tell Touqan to the east and Kafr Amim to the southeast. The M4 and M5 motorways intersect near Saraqib.

According to the Syria Central Bureau of Statistics (CBS), Saraqib had a population of 32,495 in the 2004 census. It is the administrative center and largest locality of the Saraqib nahiyah ("subdistrict") which consists of 24 localities that had a collective population of 88,076 in 2004. Its inhabitants are predominantly Sunni Muslims.

== History ==
=== Ottoman era ===
A large community of Nawar settled in Saraqib during the Ottoman era. Along with Khan Shaykhun and Ma'arat al-Numan, Saraqib is well known for its elaborate black cotton cloth embroidery.

=== Modern Syrian Republic ===
On 26 February 1959, former president Gamal Abdel Nasser addressed the city's residents in a speech commemorating the union between Egypt and Syria forming the United Arab Republic.

=== Syrian Civil War ===
The town of Saraqib lies at a strategic junction of the Aleppo-Damascus and Aleppo-Latakia roads. Since the outbreak of the Syrian civil war, from at least April 2011, the town has seen popular opposition to Bashar al-Assad's government. The Syrian Observatory for Human Rights claimed that over 200 anti-government activist suspects were arrested when Syrian security forces captured the city on 11 August 2011.

Syrian government forces recaptured the city in the Battle of Saraqib, 24–27 March 2012. On 19 July 2012, at least 25 people were killed in Syrian Army shelling following a raid by a Free Syrian Army unit based in the city on a Syrian Army checkpoint. Between 30 October and 1 November 2012, al-Nusra and Liwa Dawud—then a sub-unit of Suqour al-Sham—coordinated an attack on three government checkpoints at entrances to the town.

On 23 January 2017, Ahrar al-Sham captured Saraqib from Jabhat Fatah al-Sham. On 19 July 2017 the Hay'at Tahrir al-Sham alliance, which was created after the merger of Jabhat Fatah al-Sham and other rebel factions, recaptured the city from Ahrar al-Sham militants. Saraqib was bombed in September 2017 as part of a government/Russian offensive against rebel territories in Idlib and Hama.

On 3 February 2018, Russian military pilot Roman Filipov's Su-25SM jet was shot down by Tahrir al-Sham and Jaysh al-Nasr militants over the Idlib Governorate, near the town of Maarrat al-Nu'man (57 km (35 mi) north of the city of Hama), or the town of Saraqib, according to other sources, with a shoulder launched surface to air missile. He committed suicide by blowing his grenade to avoid capture.

On 15 October 2018, the Guardians of Religion Organization which is al-Qaeda's branch in Syria published a video in Saraqib which showed the group's religious police, the hisbah, driving around the city with loudspeakers calling on people to adhere to sharia.

In July 2019, Hayat Tahrir al-Sham raided an ISIL base in the city, arresting several individuals including an individual reportedly associated with ISIL's leader Abu Bakr al-Baghdadi, resulting in clashes between ISIL and HTS fighters; during the fighting several improvised explosive devices were detonated by ISIL.

On 6 February 2020, the city fell to the Syrian Army in the 5th Northwestern Syria offensive, but had been retaken weeks later by 26 February during a Syrian opposition and Turkish counter attack. On 1 March 2020, Saraqib was once again under Syrian Army control. On 2 March 2020, the Russian Reconciliation Centre in Syria announced that Russian Military Police had been deployed to the city. The city was left depopulated for a number of years thereafter and its infrastructure torn down and looted by the Assad regime.

On 28 November, 2024, Tahrir al-Sham launched an offensive on the eastern Idlib countryside, capturing Saraqib.

== Sports ==
The local football team is called Saraqib Sporting Club. Founded in 1980, the club last played in the Syrian League 2nd Division.

== Bibliography ==
- Berland, Joseph C. (2004). Customary Strangers: New Perspectives on Peripatetic Peoples in the Middle East, Africa, and Asia. Greenwood Publishing Group. ISBN 0897897714.
- Filiu, Jean-Pierre (2011). The Arab Revolution: Ten Lessons from the Democratic Uprising. Oxford University Press. ISBN 978-0199898299.
- Information Department (1960). President Gamal Abdel-Nasser's Speeches and Press-Interviews. Information Department.
- Shoup, John A. (2008). Culture and customs of Syria. Greenwood Press. ISBN 978-0313344565.
- Gockel, Wolfgang & Bruns, Helga (1998). Syria Lebanon. Nelles Verlag. ISBN 3886181057.
