= Sheikh Idris =

Sheikh Idris شيخ ادريس
- Village
- Location in Syria
- Coordinates: 35°46′1″N 36°51′42″E
- Country: Syria
- Governorate: Idlib
- District: Idlib District
- Subdistrict: Saraqib Nahiyah

Population (2004)
  - Total: 3,881
- Time zone: UTC+2 (EET)
  - Summer (DST): UTC+3 (EEST)
- City Qrya Pcode: C3924

Sheikh Idris (Arabic: شيخ ادريس) is a Syrian village located in Saraqib Nahiyah in Idlib District, Idlib. According to the Syria Central Bureau of Statistics (CBS), Sheikh Idris had a population of 3,881 in the 2004 census.
