= Kafr Amim =

Kafr Amim كفر عميم
- Village
- Location in Syria
- Coordinates: 35°10′32″N 36°35′21″E
- Country: Syria
- Governorate: Hama
- District: Hama
- Subdistrict: Hama

Population (2004)
  - Total: 1,063
- Time zone: UTC+3 (AST)
- City Qrya Pcode: C3004

Kafr Amim (Arabic: كفر عميم) is a Syrian village located in the Subdistrict of the Hama District in the Hama Governorate. According to the Syria Central Bureau of Statistics (CBS), Kafr Amim had a population of 1,063 in the 2004 census.

== History ==
According to the 1594 Tahrir Defter of the Hama Sanjak, the village of Kafr Amim had a population of 6 households and 1 bachelor. On the prior two defter records (taken in 1526 and 1551), the village had been listed as a mezra’a, indicating that while the settlement had no permeant residents its lands were still under cultivation by residents of neighboring villages.
