= Idlib Martyrs' Brigade =

Rebel group in the Syrian Civil War

- لواء شهداء إدلب; Liwa Shuhada’ Idlib
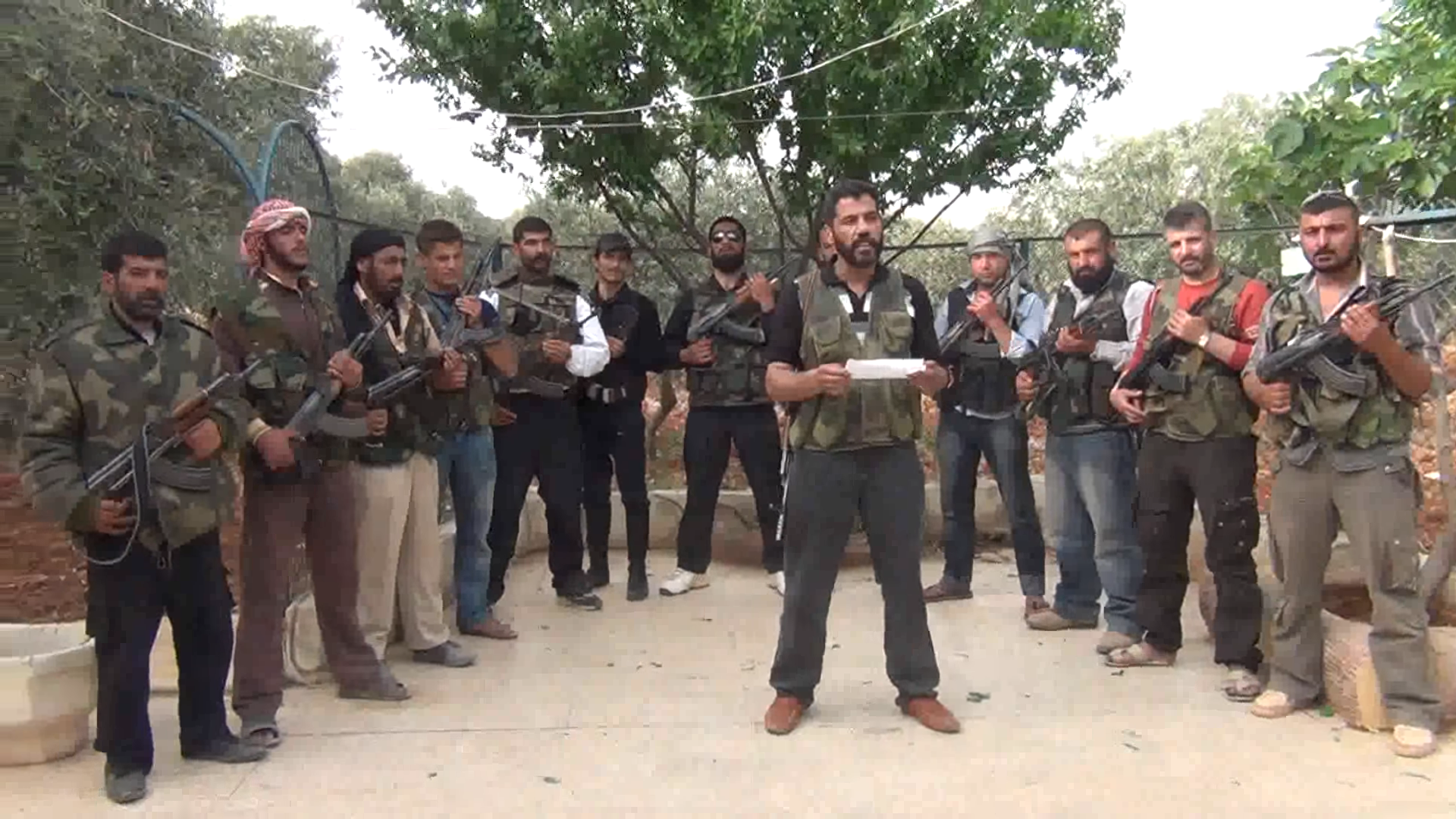
- Commanders of the Idlib Martyrs' Brigade, led by Basil Eissa (front), during their formation announcement on 29 April 2012
- Leaders: Brig. Gen. Ibrahim Nasif; Mohannad Eissa; Basil Eissa †
- Dates active: Early 2012 – 2015 (defunct)
- Groups: Shield of Islam Battalion; Sword of Justice Battalion; Osama bin Zeid Battalion; Abdullah Rahman Battalion; Martyrs Muhammad Qasim Battalion
- Active regions: Idlib Governorate, Syria
- Size: c. 900
- Part of: Free Syrian Army: Syrian Revolutionaries Front; Idlib Military Council (2012-2014); Ahfad al-Rasul Brigades (2012–13)
- Wars: Syrian civil war

The Idlib Martyrs' Brigade (Arabic: لواء شهداء إدلب, Liwa Shuhada Idlib) was an armed rebel group that fought against the Syrian government in the Idlib Governorate of Syria. It first operated under the name Syrian Liberation Army (Arabic: جيش التحرير السوري), but had renamed itself by the end of April 2012. It was a loose coalition of localized forces, mostly composed of armed Syrian civilians who joined the uprising.

== History ==
The group was based in Idlib Governorate and was primarily concerned with trying to expel government forces from the governorate, with the Idlib Martyrs' Brigade claiming that they, and not the better equipped Free Syrian Army, are doing the majority of the fighting in Idlib province. The brigade only appeared to be active in Idlib province.

One of the group's primary problems was the fact that it was incredibly difficult for it to secure weapons and ammunition. This in turn severely hampered its recruitment and its ability to carry out attacks on Syrian government forces. The group has claimed that up to 7,100 people were ready to join the group but were prevented from doing so due to lack of weaponry and equipment. This shortage resulted in the group placing greater emphasis on roadside bombings using cheaper, homemade bombs, to fight the government.

The group also refused to abide by the Kofi Annan brokered ceasefire with Haitham Qudeimati, the group's spokesman, stating that any lull in the fighting on their part would only be due to a lack of weaponry.

On 5 November 2012, the head of the Idlib Martyrs' Brigade, Basil Eissa, along with at least 20 other rebels were killed in an airstrike by the Syrian Air Force.

On 9 December 2013, the Idlib Martyrs' Brigade alongside 13 other rebel groups formed the Syrian Revolutionaries Front. In September 2014 conflict erupted between the SRF and the al-Nusra Front in the Idlib Governorate. A number of fighters from the Idlib Martyrs' Brigade were killed in the fighting.

== See also ==
- List of armed groups in the Syrian Civil War
