= Turkish military operation in Idlib Governorate =

Turkish military operation in Syria

- Part of the Turkish involvement in the Syrian civil war
- Turkish flags represent Turkish observation posts and other military installations as of 20 December 2020
Date	7 October 2017 – 8 December 2024 (9 years, 1 month, 1 week and 3 days)
Location	Idlib Governorate, Aleppo Governorate, Latakia Governorate and Hama Governorate Syria
Result	Turkish–Syrian opposition victory
Territorial changes	Turkish Armed Forces establish 70–78 military bases and observation points as of October 2020.

Belligerents
Turkey (Syrian opposition) Syrian Interim Government; Syrian Salvation Government	Syrian Arab Republic (surrendered); Hezbollah (surrendered)	Al-Qaeda

Units involved
Turkish Armed Forces: Turkish Land Forces; Armored units; Light infantry; 5th Commando Brigade; Turkish Air Force; Special forces; Syrian National Army; Hayat Tahrir al-Sham	Unknown	Kata'ib Khattab al-Shishani (possibly Katibat al-Tawhid wal-Jihad)

Strength
(Turkey) 20,000—30,000		

Casualties and losses
(Turkey) 54 soldiers, 2 civilian contractors, including Baylun airstrike (Note: Presented Turkish losses during the operation in Idlib Governorate do not include initial claims of 50–100 dead in the February 2020 Balyun airstrikes. Archived 2020-02-29 at the Wayback Machine Instead, they include 34 soldiers killed in the airstrike confirmed by Turkey. Archived 2021-04-10 at the Wayback Machine); Unknown	(Syria) (Hezbollah) 197+ killed by TAF Per SOHR: (Syria) 170 soldiers and 27 militiamen killed (between 15th of January and the 5th of March 2020). Per Middle East Institute: (Syria) 405 government soldiers and militias killed Per Turkey: (Syria) 3,136 soldiers and militiamen killed or wounded	4 killed by TAF

The Turkish military operation in Idlib Governorate (Turkish: İdlib Harekâtı), code-named Idlib De-escalation Control Force activities (Turkish: İdlib Gerginliği Azaltma Kontrol Gücü faaliyetleri) by Turkey, was an operation by the Turkish Armed Forces which started in October 2017, following the earlier Operation Euphrates Shield. It was the third cross-border operation by the Turkish military, following Operation Euphrates Shield and Operation Shah Euphrates.

== Background ==
The operation was launched following the 2017 Astana agreement and subsequent Sochi agreement between Turkey, Russia and Iran. Among other things, the two agreements contained provisions for the Turkish Armed Forces to set up and maintain 12 observation posts within resistance-held territories in the Idlib Governorate.

== Timeline ==
Map of the original 12 Turkish observation posts as per the Astana agreement, in rebel territory, per the contemporary front lines on 17 September 2018. Syrian Army control Tahrir al-Sham and allies control National Front for Liberation and allies control Turkish-backed Free Syrian Army control

=== 2017 ===
The Turkish Armed Forces set up their first observation outposts in Idlib in October 2017. Following their deployment, there were reports of minor clashes with Hayat Tahrir al-Sham militants.

=== 2018 ===
In February, the Turkish military observation outposts were expanded into northern and southeastern Idlib Governorate. On 6 February, a Turkish observation was attacked by rockets and mortars, killing a Turkish soldier and wounding five others.

On 22 May, the Turkish army established its twelfth and last military observation post in Idlib province.

==== Idlib demilitarization ====
On 15 September 2018, the Turkish observation posts were made an official part of the 2018 Idlib demilitarization agreement.

=== Northwestern Syria offensive (April–August 2019) ===
Following the start of the 2019 Northwestern Syria offensive, Turkish observation posts exchanged artillery fire with Syrian Army units multiple times.

In August 2019, the Turkish Armed Forces constructed an unofficial 13th observation post at Maar Hattat, 10 km south of Ma'arrat al-Nu'man.

In late August 2019, the Turkish observation post at Morek was fully encircled by the Syrian Army after it captured a rebel pocket in the region. The Turkish government announced that it would not move or dismantle the post.

=== Northwestern Syria offensive (December 2019 – March 2020) ===
In late December 2019, the Turkish observation post near Sarman was encircled by the Syrian Army during the course of its Autumn offensive. Turkey has stated that it would not evacuate the post.

=== 2020 ===
On 30 January 2020, following the Syrian Army's capture of Ma'arrat al-Nu'man, the Turkish Army set up two more observation posts – just South and North of the town of Saraqib. It then established a third post to the east of the town on 1 February.

On 1 February 2020, the Syrian military encircled the Turkish observation post at Maar Hattat, which was built following the Syrian Army's capture of Khan Shaykhun in the summer of 2019.

On 3 February 2020, Syrian Army shelling killed seven Turkish soldiers and one civilian contractor. Seven soldiers were also wounded. The Turkish Army retaliated by targeting Syrian Army positions with artillery and howitzer fire, resulting in 13 dead.

On 5 February, the Syrian Army captured the village of Tell Touqan and thus encircled the Turkish observation post located there. It was not immediately made clear whether or not the post was placed under siege.

On 6 February, the Turkish Armed Forces established a new outpost at Taftanaz Military Airbase. It was reportedly targeted by the Syrian Air Force just hours after its establishment. The Syrian Army completely encircled the town of Saraqib, which hosts four unofficial TAF military installations.

On 7 February, the Turkish Armed Forces created a new military post east of Idlib City, just west of Saraqib.

On 8 February, the Turkish Armed Forces established yet another military post, this time located in the Al-Mastumah area between Idlib City and Ariha. A day after the Syrian Army began encircling the Turkish observation post at Al-Eiss, it managed to capture both the town and its corresponding hill after the rebel forces that previously controlled it withdrew following a three-pronged envelopment by government forces.

On 10 February, five or six Turkish soldiers were killed and another seven were wounded due to artillery fire from the Syrian Armed Forces.

On 14 February, the Turkish army set up a base at Deir Sunbul village.

On 15 February, the Turkish army established two new military posts near Darat Izza.

On 16 February, the Syrian Army shelled the Turkish military post at Shekh Aqil, reportedly injuring many Turkish soldiers.

On 17 February, the Syrian Observatory for Human Rights reported that the Turkish military had established several more military posts, bringing the total number of official and unofficial Turkish military installations in Idlib up to 35.

On 20 February, 2 Turkish soldiers died and 5 were reported wounded while they were assaulting, along with their proxies, the town of Al-Nayrab.

On 26 February, 2 Turkish troops were killed and several others were reported wounded following a Syrian airstrike in Idlib province. The Syrian Army captured Deir Sunbul, besieging the nearby Turkish observation post stationed nearby in an area called Sheir Maghar.

==== Operation Spring Shield ====
On 27 February, at least 33 Turkish soldiers were killed by Syrian or Russian airstrikes. Rebel forces advanced on Saraqeb under the cover of Turkish missile fire, thus managing to recapture the town and lift the siege imposed on three of the four surrounding Turkish observation posts – to the north, west and south of the town. The eastern observation post remained surrounded by government forces.

On 28 February, one Turkish soldier died and six more were wounded in Syrian air and artillery strikes in Idlib.

Between 28 February and 6 March at least 165 Syrian soldiers and militiamen loyal to them were killed by Turkish Armed Forces in retaliation to Balyun airstrikes that killed at least 33 Turkish soldiers. Based on open source data, some think tanks stated that 405 regime soldiers, including 30 high-ranking officers, were killed in the Turkish army's counter-offensive and more than 70 tanks and armored vehicles were destroyed. New Lines Institute reported that it received information from sources close to the American government, and that as a result of the Turkish Armed Forces' attack, the Syrian Army lost 3 warplanes, 3 UAVs, 8 helicopters, 135 tanks, 86 artillery and MLRS, 77 armored vehicles and many more. It was also stated that an average of 60 regime soldiers were thought to have been killed per day between February 27 and March 5.

==== Ceasefire (March 2020–November 2024) ====
On 18 March, Turkish troops entered the de-escalation zone to reopen the M4 highway previously blocked by Hayat Tahrir al-Sham and jihadist factions.

On April 26, Turkish forces killed 4 fighters of Hayat Tahrir Al-Sham in Idlib.

On 5 May, Syrian forces destroyed a Turkish bulldozer with a missile in Al-Dweir checkpoint north of Saraqeb. A second bulldozer sent to retrieve the first was in turn destroyed by another missile, killing and wounding the drivers.

On 27 May, the Turkish Ministry of Defense announced the death of a Turkish soldier by an explosion in the Aleppo-Latakia Highway in northwestern Idlib. A convoy of Turkish military vehicles and opposition factions was targeted by a IED, Turkish helicopters evacuated the wounded to Al-Rayhaniyyah.

On 9 September, the Turkish Armed forces said that Brigadier General Sezgin Erdoğan died while on duty on Idlib, Syria. According to Turkish officials, Sezgin Erdoğan died in a hospital after falling ill.

On 19 October 2020, Turkey withdrew its military presence from its base at Morek, Hama Governorate.

==== Deterrence of Aggression (November 2024–December 2024) ====
On 27 November 2024, a coalition of Syrian opposition groups called the Military Operations Command led by Hay'at Tahrir al-Sham (HTS) and supported by allied Turkish-backed groups in the Syrian National Army (SNA) launched an offensive against the pro-government Syrian Arab Army (SAA) forces in Idlib, Aleppo and Hama Governorates in Syria. The operation was codenamed Deterrence of Aggression (Note: Arabic: ردع العدوان, romanized: Rade Aleudwan) by HTS and stated as being launched in retaliation for the increased SAA shelling of civilians in the Western Aleppo countryside. This is the first time that opposition forces in the Syrian civil war launched a military offensive campaign since the March 2020 Idlib ceasefire.

On 29 November 2024, HTS and later the Syrian Democratic Forces (SDF) entered Aleppo and captured most of the city, amid the collapse of pro-government forces. The next day, opposition forces made rapid advances, capturing dozens of towns and villages as pro-government forces disintegrated, and advanced toward Hama in central Syria, subsequently capturing it on 5 December. By 6 December, the SDF captured Deir ez-Zor in an offensive east of the Euphrates, while the newly formed Southern Operations Room and Al-Jabal Brigade captured Daraa and Suwayda in an offensive in the south. The HTS advanced further south toward Homs. The US-backed Syrian Free Army (SFA) took control of Palmyra in the southeast of the country.

On 7 December 2024, Southern Front forces entered the Rif Dimashq Governorate from the south, and came within 10 kilometers of the capital Damascus. Later, opposition forces were reported to have entered the suburbs of the capital. SFA forces moved towards the capital from the south east. By 8 December, they had captured Homs, which effectively cut Assad's forces from Syria's coast.

On 8 December 2024, rebels captured the capital Damascus, toppling Bashar al-Assad's government and ending the Assad family's 53-year long rule over the country. According to sources from Turkish Defense Ministry, the tasks of the Turkish Armed Forces have not been completed yet in Syria. "Depending on the need, the redeployment of our troops in Syria or their assignment to different regions may be considered”.

== List of observation posts ==
The following is a non-exhaustive list of observation posts and other military installations of the Turkish Armed Forces in Idlib:

List of observation posts
Location	Order of Construction	Date of Construction
Salva village near Al-Dana	1	13 October 2017
Samaan village near Darat Izza	2	23 October 2017
Aquil Mountain near Darat Izza	3	19 November 2017
Al-Eiss near Al-Hadher	4	5 February 2018
Tell Touqan	5	9 February 2018
Sarman	6	15 February 2018
Anadan	7	17 March 2018
Zaytuneh	8	3 April 2018
Morek	9	7 April 2018
Rashidin in Western Aleppo	10	9 May 2018
Zawiyah (Sheir Maghar) in southern Idlib	11	14 May 2018
Ishtabrak in southwestern Idlib	12	16 May 2018
Maar Hattat	13	20 August 2019
Al-Tarnbah	14	February 2020
Al-Nayrab	15	February 2020
Al-Mughir	16	February 2020
Qminas	17	February 2020
Sarmin	18	February 2020
Taftanaz Military Airbase	19	February 2020
Maarat al-Naasan	20	February 2020
Maarrat Misrin	21	February 2020
Al-Jinah	22	February 2020
Kafr Karmin	23	February 2020
Al-Tawama	24	February 2020
Al-Fawj 111	25	February 2020
Camp al-Mastumah	26	February 2020
Termanin	27	February 2020
Atarib	28	February 2020
Darat Izza	29	February 2020
Al-Barqali	30	February 2020
Nahli	31	February 2020
Maataram	32	February 2020
Sangul	33	February 2020
Nabi Ayyub	34	February 2020
Zabour	35	February 2020
Battu	36	2020
Battu (2)	37	2020
Kafr Nouran	38	2020
Al-Ibzmo	39	2020
Ram Hamdan	40	2020
Al-Jinah (2)	41	2020
Batabu	42	2020
Sindiran	43	2020
Baddaran	44	2020
Al-Ibzmu (2)	45	2020
Ram Hamdan (2)	46	2020
Al-Jinah (3)	47	2020
Bainasarah	48	2020
Sanshiran	49	2020
Al-Ibzmu (3)	50	2020
Ram Hamdan (3)	51	2020
Al-Jinah (4)	52	2020
Diranjeh	53	2020
Bdirnoran	54	2020
Al-Ibzmu (4)	55	2020
Ram Hamdan (4)	56	2020
Al-Jinah (5)	57	2020
Battu (3)	58	2020
Sanshiran (2)	59	2020
al-Nabi al-Nabi Ayyub	60	2020
Jericho	61	2020
Jannat al-Qura	62	2020
Bassamas	63	2020
Tell al-Nabi Ayyub	64	2020
al-Qiyasat	65	2020
Bisnqul	66	2020
Maarat Marian	67	2020
Mantaf	68	2020
Muhambal	69	2020
Tal Arqam	70	2020
Qafin	71	2020

Colour key
Official observation posts
Unofficial observation posts
Observation posts that Turkey has withdrawn from

== Reactions ==
=== Within Syria ===
- Ba'athist Syria: An unnamed source at Syria's Foreign Ministry said, "The Turkish regime must abide by what was agreed in Astana."
- Army of Revolutionaries: Ahmed Sultan, commander of the Army of Revolutionaries, accused Turkey of selling Idlib to the Syrian regime, Iran and Russia and called upon the people of Idlib to resist the planned Turkish, Iranian, and Russian intervention in Idlib.

=== International reactions ===
- Russia: The head of the Russian delegation for the Astana talks, Alexander Lavrentyev, said that Russia was ready to act as a mediator between the Syrian government and Turkey regarding the situation in Idlib.

=== Supranational reactions ===
- United Nations: The UN's special envoy to Syria, Staffan de Mistura, said the creation of a fourth de-escalation zone is a positive development.

== See also ==
- Turkish occupation of northern Syria
- Turkish involvement in the Syrian civil war
- Syrian–Turkish normalization
- Inter-rebel conflict during the Syrian Civil War
  - al-Nusra Front–SRF/Hazzm Movement conflict
  - Battle of Maarrat al-Nu'man (2016)
  - October 2016 Idlib Governorate clashes
  - Idlib Governorate clashes (January–March 2017)
  - Idlib Governorate clashes (July 2017)
