= Salwah =

Salwah صلوة
- Village
- Location within Syria
- Coordinates: 36°18′31″N 36°45′23″E
- Country: Syria
- Governorate: Idlib
- District: Harem
- Subdistrict: al-Dana

Population (2004)
  - Total: 3,244
- Time zone: UTC+2 (EET)
  - Summer (DST): UTC+3 (EEST)

Salwah (Arabic: صلوة) is a village in Syria, administratively part of Idlib Governorate. It is located just west of the Dead Cities. Nearby localities include Jalmah to the north, Darat Izza to the southeast, Talaadah to the southeast, al-Dana to the south, and Atme and Qah to the west. According to the Syria Central Bureau of Statistics (CBS), Salwah had a population of 3,244 in 2004.
