= Idlib Governorate clashes (July 2017) =

Series of military confrontations

- Part of inter-rebel conflicts during the Syrian civil war
| Date | 14–23 July 2017 (1 week and 2 days) |
| Location | Idlib Governorate, western Aleppo Governorate, and northern Hama Governorate, Syria |
| Result | Hay'at Tahrir al-Sham victory: Hay'at Tahrir al-Sham captured 1 city, over 31 towns and villages, including Idlib, Maarrat Misrin, Sarmada, Atme, Salqin, Saraqib, Darat Izza, and Turmanin.; Ahrar al-Sham forces in northern Idlib withdraw to the al-Ghab Plain; Ahrar al-Sham captured Atarib |
| Territorial changes | Hay'at Tahrir al-Sham controlled 60% of the Idlib Governorate |

Belligerents
| Ahrar al-Sham (Syrian opposition) Free Syrian Army Supported by: Turkey | Hay'at Tahrir al-Sham; Turkistan Islamic Party in Syria |

Units involved
| Ahrar al-Sham: Suqour al-Sham | Hay'at Tahrir al-Sham: Al-Nusra Front; Nour al-Din al-Zenki Movement (until 20 July); Al-Hujra Brigade (since 19 July); Dawn of Islam Brigade (since 19 July) |

Casualties and losses
- 77 fighters from both sides and 15 civilians killed

The Idlib Governorate clashes (July 2017) were a series of military confrontations between Ahrar al-Sham and Hay'at Tahrir al-Sham (HTS). During the clashes, Hay'at Tahrir al-Sham attempted to capture the Bab al-Hawa Border Crossing, causing concern for Turkey, which prefers Ahrar al-Sham to be in control of the crossing. As a result of the clashes, HTS took control of Idlib city, the Bab al-Hawa Border Crossing, and most of the areas along the Turkish border in the Idlib Province.

== Background ==
The Syrian Observatory for Human Rights (SOHR) said that the fighting began when HTS fired on demonstrators throughout the Idlib Governorate who carried the 1932 French Mandate flag, recently adopted by Ahrar al-Sham in addition to its original white Islamic flag. HTS, which embraces the Black Standard, opposes the use of the tricolour flag. The two rivals accused each other of provoking this round of fighting in Iblin.

== The clashes ==
Prior to the major breakout of fighting, on 14 July, clashes occurred between Ahrar al-Sham and Suqour al-Sham against Hay'at Tahrir al-Sham in multiple locations in the Idlib Governorate, including Saraqib and Jabal Zawiya.

On 19 July, forces of Hay'at Tahrir al-Sham took hold of the town of Salqin, later in the day capturing Al-Dana and Saraqib. On 20 July, Hay'at Tahrir al-Sham captured the border town of Atme from Ahrar al-Sham. Following the capture of Atme, Hay'at Tahrir al-Sham attempted to capture the Bab al-Hawa Border Crossing in its campaign to cut off Ahrar al-Sham from Turkey. On 21 July, a convoy of forces from the Sham Legion and the Nour al-Din al-Zenki Movement, which left Hay'at Tahrir al-Sham the previous day, headed to Darat Izza near frontlines between Ahrar al-Sham and Hay'at Tahrir al-Sham. However, before reaching the frontlines, the convoy was intercepted by Hay'at Tahrir al-Sham, and was forced to withdraw. On the same day, a cease-fire agreement was reached between Ahrar al-Sham and Hay'at Tahrir al-Sham, which involved the withdrawal of Ahrar al-Sham from the Bab al-Hawa border crossing and its control handed over to a civil council. Soon after, Hay'at Tahrir al-Sham forces entered the towns of Maarrat Misrin and Ram Hamdan, after Ahrar al-Sham withdrew without fighting.

Russia and Turkey considered intervening to bring peace to the region.

On 22 July, HTS captured the remaining parts of Idlib city not already under their control, with Ahrar evacuating the city, heading towards the southern parts of Idlib Governorate; on the next day, both sides agreed to renew the ceasefire. Nevertheless, HTS and Turkistan Islamic Party fighters also evicted Ahrar al-Sham from the Khirbat al-Joz border crossing and clashed with it in Jisr al-Shughur's western countryside. A car bomb explosion in Idlib city also killed between 13 and 52 people, including up to 50 HTS members and 2 civilians.
