= Hafasraja =

Hafasraja حفسرجة
- Village
- Location in Syria
- Coordinates: 36°1′4″N 36°31′43″E
- Country: Syria
- Governorate: Idlib
- District: Harem District
- Subdistrict: Armanaz Subdistrict
- Elevation: 497 m (1,631 ft)

Population (2004)
  - Total: 4,287
- Time zone: UTC+2 (EET)
  - Summer (DST): UTC+3 (EEST)
- City Qrya Pcode: C4178

Hafasraja (Arabic: حفسرجة) is located in the Armanaz Subdistrict of Harem District in Idlib Governorate, in north-western Syria near the border with Turkey. The village lies in the countryside north-west of the city of Idlib and is surrounded by several settlements, including Biret Armanaz and Quneitra. According to the Syria Central Bureau of Statistics (CBS), Hafasraja had a population of 4,287 in the 2004 census.

The area forms part of the agricultural plains and hills of northern Idlib, where farming is a major component of the local economy. Crops commonly cultivated in the surrounding countryside include olives, wheat, and vegetables.

== Syrian civil war ==
During the Syrian civil war, Hafsarjah and the surrounding countryside of Idlib were affected by conflict, displacement and bombardment. According to the Atlantic Council, displaced civilians from areas such as Qalaat al-Madiq settled in a number of villages in Idlib Governorate, including Hafsarjah.

Security incidents were also reported in the area. The use of improvised explosive device (IED) where used in attacks in several locations in Idlib Governorate including the village of Hafasraja, during mid-2017.

The village was affected by airstrikes and shelling in later stages of the conflict. Russian airstrikes on 8 September 2022 targeted Sheikh Yousef and Hafasraja, killing seven civilians and wounding twelve others. Local media also reported shelling by Syrian government forces on several locations in southern Idlib countryside, including Hafasraja, in July 2023.
