= Qah =

Qah قاح
- Village
- Location within Syria
- Coordinates: 36°17′47″N 36°43′31″E
- Country: Syria
- Governorate: Idlib
- District: Harem
- Subdistrict: Al-Dana

Population (2004 census)
  - Total: 2,262
- Time zone: UTC+2 (EET)
  - Summer (DST): UTC+3 (EEST)

Qah (Arabic: قاح, also spelled Kah) is a village in northern Syria, administratively part of the Idlib Governorate, located north of Idlib and just east of the Syria–Turkey border. Nearby localities include Atme to the west, Jindires to the north, Deir Samaan to the northeast, Darat Izza to the east, Turmanin to the southeast and al-Dana to the south. According to the Syria Central Bureau of Statistics, Qah had a population of 2,262 in the 2004 census.

== History ==
=== Modern history ===
==== Qah refugee camp ====
Qah is the site of the largest refugee camp within Syria for people fleeing areas experiencing violence during the ongoing Syrian uprising against the Syrian government. The camp consists of 40,000 square metres (10 acres) of farmland and olive groves purchased by local farmers with funds from the local community, Libya, and the IHH, a Turkish NGO. The project was organized in October 2012 by local volunteers and headed by Syrian imam Sheikh Omar Rahman. According to Rahman, the camp will be able to hold 5,000 to 10,000 refugees and is supposed to serve as a temporary transit point before entering Turkey. The camp was set up to relieve overcrowding in nearby Atme. Security is provided by an opposition militia, the Martyrs of al-Ariyeh Brigade, which is made up of Qah residents. Recently, the town came under the control of the Syrian National Army.

On 20 November 2019, it was struck by a ground-to-ground missile from the Assad regime with Russian and Iranian support. It killed at least 15 people, including six children. The United States strongly condemned the attack.
