= Timeline of the Syrian civil war (2020) =

The following is a timeline of the Syrian civil war for 2020. Information about aggregated casualty counts is found at Casualties of the Syrian civil war.

== January ==
=== Idlib ===
The Syrian government continued to launch major attacks on rebel groups in Northwestern Syria ("Greater Idlib"), with Russian air support. Continued operations have caused over 200,000 refugees to flee the area, with many fleeing to Turkey.

On 11 January, Russia announced that a ceasefire had been agreed to in the area of Idlib and Northwest Syria, between Russia, Syria, Syrian rebels and Turkey. This was due to requests by Turkey for a ceasefire, in order to stop the flow of Syrian refugees into Turkey. However, some regional news outlets reported that Syria launched further attacks near Idlib, in Ma'arrat al-Nu'man District and the villages of Maar Shoreen, Talmenes, and Maar Shamshah, even after the ceasefire had officially begun.

On 21 January, Russian warplanes targeted a farm on the outskirts of the Kafar Taal village, in western Aleppo province, killing nine civilians, among them six children, and also targeted areas in the southern and south-eastern countryside of Idlib, inflicting damage to property.

On 28 January, the Syrian Arab Army captured the strategic city of Ma'arrat al-Nu'man. A war monitor and government media added that the Syrian army went into the city under the protection of heavy air strikes.

=== Northeastern Syria ===
According to Anadolu Agency, on 18 January, U.S. troops blocked a Russian convoy from entering Rmelan, where the U.S. is protecting oil fields under SDF administration. Tension occurred between the two groups as U.S. soldiers asked the Russian soldiers to return to the Amuda district in northwest of Al-Hasakah Governorate.

There was a dispute in the UN Security Council over the re-authorization for border-crossing points into Syria to deliver aid. The existing authorization expired on 10 January 2020. In December 2019, China and Russia vetoed a proposal to renew all four existing crossing points, which are located in Iraq, Jordan, and Turkey; they wished to eliminate all crossing points except the ones in Turkey. By January 2020, the dispute was ongoing.

== February ==
On 1 February, four officers from the K and S units of Russia's Federal Security Service were reported killed near Aleppo.

=== Al-Tanf ===
Around 16 February, an Iranian-backed proxy group reportedly approached Al-Tanf, and were then repelled by the U.S.-partnered Maghaweir al-Thowra.

=== Idlib and Aleppo ===
The Syrian army's Idlib and Aleppo offensive, which began in December 2019

According to the UK-based Syrian Observatory for Human Rights (SOHR), by 6 February, the Syrian Army had captured 139 (including areas captured last year) towns, villages and hilltops, including the strategic city of Ma'arrat al-Nu'man, towns and villages of Al-Tah, Jarjnaz, Tell Mannas, Kafr Rumah, Khan al-Sabil, Hish, Sarmin and Afs and Turkish observation posts at Sarman, Maar Hattat, Tell Touqan, Rashidin in Western Aleppo and 4 posts inside the encircled Saraqib pocket. Humanitarian organizations called for a ceasefire in Idlib after 520,000 people had been displaced from their homes.

On 10 February, pro-Syrian government and Iranian-backed militias including Shabiha were filmed desecrating the graves and exhuming the bodies of opposition fighters and those affiliated with them, in a series of clips circulated on social media during the two days prior, in southern Idlib province, and holding skulls of opposition fighters and civilians and mocking them.

On 18 February, the United Nations High Commissioner for Human Rights expressed her concerns over the increase in fighting in northwest Syria and blamed the Syrian government and Russia for intentionally targeting civilians.

On 20 February, Turkish-backed rebels launched another counteroffensive on Nayrab with Turkish artillery support. Turkish commandos were also reported to have been operating alongside rebels in the assault on the town. A Russian UAV was reported to have been shot down during the initial shelling and rocket strikes. Russian planes provided air support to the pro-government forces and struck positions of the advancing rebels. Additional shelling on nearby towns on both the government-controlled and opposition-controlled sides of the frontline were reported, with both Russian and Turkish forces involved in air and artillery support roles respectively. During the battle, rebels reportedly attempted to shoot down a Russian Su-24 using Turkish-provided MANPADS.

After heavy fighting, the rebels managed to take full control of the town. However, Russian air support allowed the pro-government forces to eventually repel the rebel assault and recapture Nayrab. Russia contacted Turkish forces and told them to end artillery support to the rebels, which they did, according to Russia. The Turkish Ministry of Defense confirmed that two Turkish soldiers had been killed and five wounded due to an airstrike during the assault, while also claiming the Turkish-backed rebels killed 50 Syrian government forces during the battle. The Russian Ministry of Defence said Russian forces destroyed one tank, six armored vehicles, and five other vehicles all belonging to the rebels. As well as the two confirmed Turkish deaths, the SOHR said that about 28 rebels and 14 pro-government soldiers were killed and that some Syrian soldiers were beheaded by jihadist fighters.

On 27 February, during the Syrian Army offensive on Idlib an airstrike against a Turkish Army convoy in Balyun, Idlib resulted in the deaths of at least 34 Turkish soldiers according to the Syrian Observatory for Human Rights, while other sources close to Turkey gave tolls of 50–70 dead Turkish soldiers, making it the single deadliest attack on Turkish forces since its involvement in the war. Between 36 and 60 soldiers were also wounded. At around 11 a.m. on 27 February 2020, two Russian Sukhoi Su-34 and two Syrian Su-22 fighter jets started intensive bombing raids of Turkish-backed rebel forces in the southern countryside of Syria's Idlib province. According to Russian sources, after 1 p.m., Turkish troops conducted more than 15 MANPADS attacks against the Russian and Syrian jets, with some Russian aircraft allegedly suffering damage while evading the fire.

At around 5 p.m., a 400-man Turkish mechanized infantry battalion traveling in a convoy was targeted by an airstrike on the road between al-Bara and Balyun, around five kilometers north of Kafr Nabl. A light airstrike by a Su-22s halted the convoy, after which more intense bombing forced the Turkish soldiers to take shelter in the nearby buildings. The Russian jets then reportedly dropped KAB-1500L laser-guided bombs on the Turkish positions, collapsing two buildings and leaving a number of soldiers under the rubble. Russia denied it carried out airstrikes in the area and stated it made attempts to ensure the Syrian military ceased firing to allow the evacuation of the Turkish troops, but noted the Turkish forces should not have been in the area, where "counter-terror operations" were taking place, and that Turkey failed to notify it about the soldiers' presence in advance.

On 28 February, the Defense Ministry of Turkey stated that a day after 33 of their soldiers were killed in the air strike, artillery fire was launched by Syrian forces in northwest Idlib province of Syria, which led to the killing of one Turkish soldier and two others injured. The Turkish military also continued to attack Syrian Government targets in the region as well, according to the defense ministry. Turkey said it retaliated for Balyun strikes by striking 200 Syrian government targets and 309 soldiers. NATO and the US expressed support for Turkey and urged Russia to engage with UN ceasefire efforts, while the UN expressed concern at developments.

=== Northeastern Syria ===
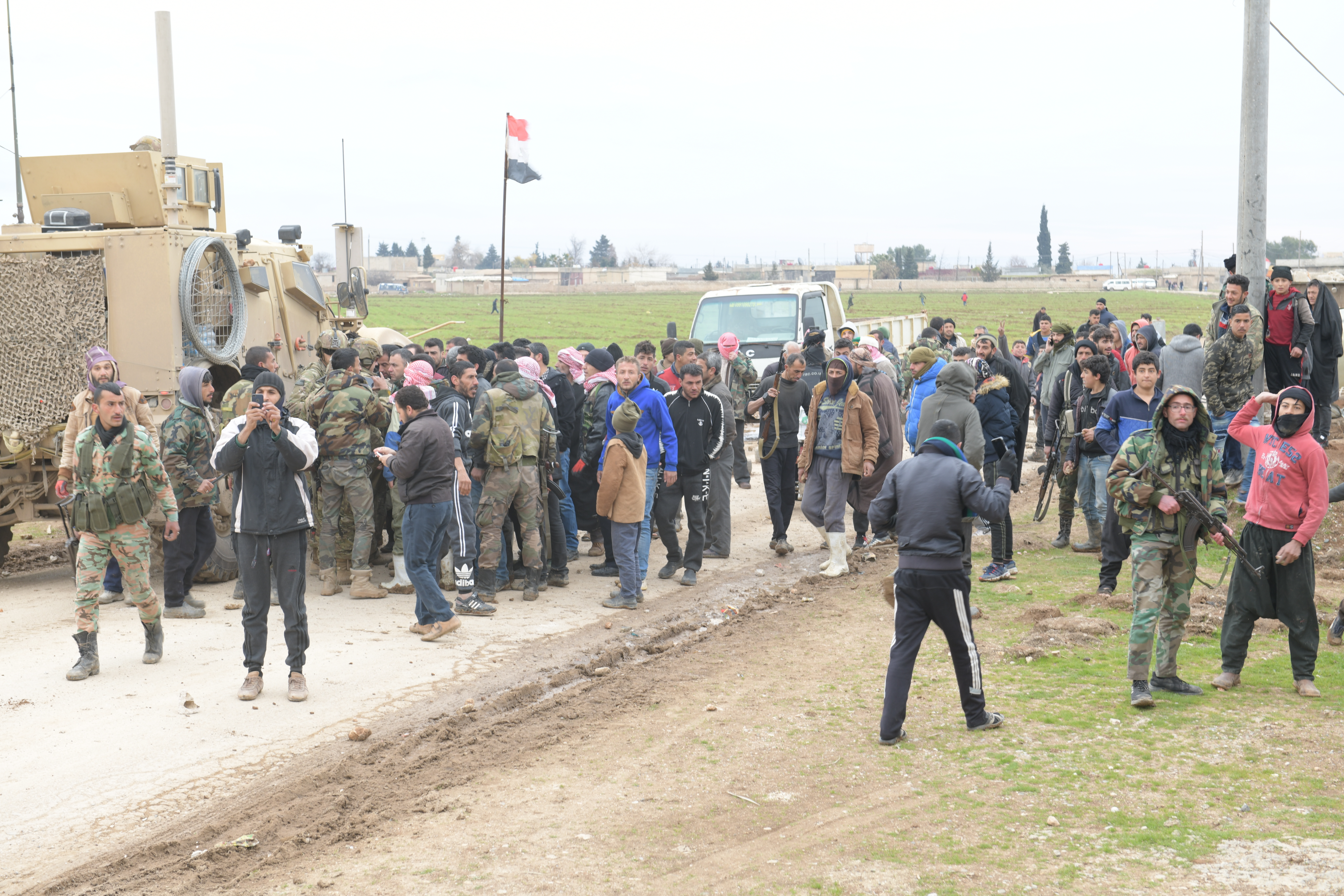
Civilians and pro-Assad militiamen block an American convoy near Qamishli, 12 February 2020

On 12 February, government supporters blocked and pelted a U.S. military convoy passing through Qamishli, which led to a clash with U.S. troops, killing one civilian and injuring another. There is no certainty as to whether the civilian who was killed was armed or not, a monitoring group stated. Local sources and U.S. officials said that pro-Syrian government militiamen were also part of the stand off. According to the coalition spokesman Col. Myles Caggins, the coalition troops were compelled to exchange fire in an act of self-defense and that the incident is under investigation.

On 16 February, at least 55 vehicles of the U.S. military convoy were spotted entering al-Hasakah province in northeastern Syria from Iraq, according to pro-Damascus sources.

== March ==
After the attack in northwest Idlib on 27 February, which caused the death of dozens of Turkish soldiers, Turkey declared on 1 March, that it was starting a major counteroffensive against Bashar al-Assad's government. The announcement was made by Turkey's defense minister Hulusi Akar, after which he described the decision as an attempt to prevent the Syrian government from launching dangerous attacks against Syrians, as well as to ensure the establishment of an extensive ceasefire in the region. Two Syrian fighter jets were reported to have been shot down in Idlib province by a Turkish F-16, as the offensive against Syrian forces intensifies. The pilots managed to eject from the jets and land safely at the clash site between Syrian forces and Turkish troops in Idlib province, the BBC added. Also, the Syrian media confirmed that there were no casualties in the northwestern Idlib attack. The defense minister of Turkey maintained that in addition to the shooting down of the two Syrian military aircraft in the offensive known as Operation Spring Shield, he disclosed that Turkey had killed over 2,000 Syrian government troops.

On 1 March, the March 2020 Daraa clashess began.

On 5 March, a meeting was held between Russian President Vladimir Putin and his Turkish counterpart Recep Tayyip Erdogan, after which both parties agreed to a military ceasefire in Idlib province of northwestern Syria. The meeting between the Turkish and Russian president which was held in Moscow, reportedly lasted for about six hours. Presidents Putin and Erdogan announced that the ceasefire was scheduled to commence on Thursday evening at midnight. In accordance with the ceasefire agreement, joint patrols and a security corridor were established along the vital M4 highway. On 7 March, breaking the truce, pro-government forces captured the villages of Al Burayi and Ma'arat Muqas after heavy shelling, but pulled back the following day under pressure from Russia.

On 24 March, in order to fight the coronavirus outbreak, the UN special envoy for Syria urged for an instant ceasefire throughout the country. The International Committee of the Red Cross also called for a ceasefire, as they cannot simultaneously deal with the virus outbreak and cater for the displaced people of Syria, the ICRC regional director added.

On 31 March, the Shayrat Airbase in Syria came under an Israeli missile attack, during a meeting between high-ranking officers of Syria and Iran. No casualties were reported in the attack, as the Syrian air defenses were able to intercept the Israeli missiles. According to the Syrian Observatory for Human Rights, eight missiles were believed to have been fired by the Israeli warplanes at the Al-Shayrat air base.

== April ==
As the Syrian war entered its tenth year on 1 April, the monthly death toll recorded by SOHR in March was the lowest, due to a fall in the number of civilian casualties. SOHR said a total of 103 civilians had been killed, with 51 of them dying as a result of air strikes and shellings. SOHR reported that the civilian death toll was less than half that in February, which was placed at 275, when a major government offensive in Syria's last opposition stronghold was still active.

On 8 April, the Organisation for the Prohibition of Chemical Weapons (OPCW) for the first time formally accuses the Syrian government of chemical warfare, referring to an attack on Al-Lataminah in March 2017.

On 13 April, Turkish riot police dispersed dozens of Syrians participating in a sit-in on the M4 highway in the northwest linking the key cities of Saraqeb and Latakia; the incident showed a growing dissatisfaction toward the joint Russian-Turkish military presence in the area.

Local sources from Quneitra confirmed to Arabi21 that Russia was exploiting the poverty under which people were living in Syria to recruit young people - with wages and the promise to settle the security situation - to fight in Libya alongside the forces of General Khalifa Haftar against the Government of National Accord.

On 27 April, the Syrian Network for Human Rights (SNHR) reported that the Syrian government continued to commit multiple human rights violations in March and April, the same months seeing the rapid spread of the COVID-19 pandemic, with 44 civilians including six children killed, and its forces arrested 156 people, and committed at least four attacks on vital civilian facilities, including two schools. The Syrian military blamed Israel for launching a missile attack on a military airfield close to Damascus. As a result of the attack, at least three civilian casualties were reported, leaving four more wounded, according to Al Jazeera. However, SANA added that the Syrian military was able to intercept the missiles, which they believe were fired from Lebanese airspace.

On 28 April, a bombing in Afrin killed 40 people, including 11 children. No group claimed responsibility. Turkey blamed the YPG for the attack. According to the head of SOHR, at least six pro-Turkish Syrian fighters were among those killed in the blast with a possibility of increase in the death toll. At least 47 people were reported injured. According to the governor of the neighbouring Hatay province, across the Turkish border, the explosion was believed to have been caused by the rigging of a fuel tanker with hand grenades. Many people, alongside those who got trapped in their cars were burnt to death as a result of the blast, Syrian activists disclosed.

In April, it was alleged that the Crown Prince of Abu Dhabi, Mohammed bin Zayed had been attempting to persuade the Syrian President Bashar al-Assad to break a ceasefire with Turkish-backed rebels in Idlib province. Mohammed bin Zayed allegedly offered Assad $3 billion in cash to push the offensive.

== May ==
On 11 May, reports from Amnesty International suggested that 18 attacks were carried out on civilian facilities, including medical facilities, in northwestern Syria between 5 May 2019, and 25 February 2020, by the Syrian government. The report said that the Syrian military intentionally attacked civilian facilities such as schools and hospitals.

On 18 May, the UN envoy for Syria Geir Pedersen urged Russia and the US to take advantage of the partial cooling down of the situation in the region, and sue for peace so as to bring the conflict to an end. Pedersen said that the lack of dialogue between the two countries had left the people of Syria to pay the consequences. He also mentioned that Russia, Turkey and Iran, are all integral to the establishment of a ceasefire in the region. Pedersen is the fourth mediator serving in the capacity of UN envoy to Syria who has attempted to resolve the differences in the war-torn country.

On 27 May, pro-Syrian government militias destroyed and desecrated the grave of the eighth Umayyad Caliph Umar Ibn Abdul Aziz, located in the village of Deir Sharqi in the area of Ma'arrat al-Nu'man in the north-west province of Idlib, and with the contents exhumed and disappeared.

On 29 May, the Russian government proposed a dialogue with Assad's government, in an attempt to increase its military facilities in the country. President Vladimir Putin ordered the defense and foreign ministries to oversee the negotiation with the Syrian government in having access to more facilities on both land and sea.

== June ==
On 1 June, the Syrian Network for Human Rights (SNHR) reported that the death toll of civilians in the month of May in Syria had reached a total of 125, including 26 children and six women. The group also reported that eight people were killed as a result of torture, with seven of them killed by the Syrian government forces and another by the Syrian Democratic forces.

On 3 June, the last rebel stronghold/de-escalation zone was attacked by a series of airstrikes, carried out by Russian jets. Based on reports from the SOHR, the airstrikes were launched where the borders of Hama, Idlib, and Latakia provinces converge. According to the Daily Sabah, no casualties were reported.

On 7 June, the towns of Manarah and Fatrah were captured by Hurras al-Din jihadists in Idlib Governorate, but after Russian airstrikes the Syrian Army managed to recapture the towns on the same day. The fighting left 22 rebels and 19 government soldiers killed, according to the Syrian Observatory of Human Rights.

On 20 June, In light of the increase in number of COVID-19 cases, activists urged for the release of political prisoners in Syria. Officials of the UN expressed concerns over the virus spreading in prisons.

On 22 June, a Syrian doctor residing in Germany was detained on the allegation of committing crimes against humanity at a prison in Syria. Dr. Alaa Mousa is believed to be the third former Syrian official to be detained in Germany, according to The New York Times. When Mousa was working at a prison in Homs in 2011, he reportedly engaged in beating a detainee (who had been assigned to him for treatment) with a plastic pipe. According to the German prosecutors' office, at the time of the incident, the detainee was said to be suffering from an epileptic seizure, after being arrested for participating in a protest. The doctor was believed to have been summoned the next day to attend to the detainee, but came along with another doctor who also had a plastic pipe with him. They continued beating and kicking the victim until he became unconscious and incapacitated.

The state-controlled Syrian Arab News Agency reported that Israeli missiles were launched in southern and eastern Syria on 23 June, killing at least two Syrian soldiers and leaving four others injured. According to Al Jazeera, the attacks are believed to be aimed at bases defended by Iranian-backed militias. Apart from the two Syrian soldiers killed in the southern province of Sweida, five members of the pro-Iranian militia were also killed, bringing the death toll to seven people, the Times of Israel reported. However, the Israeli army has not made any comments about the attack, despite the fact that Israeli military officials have stated that it would seek the overhaul of Iranian presence in Syria. The Syrian Observatory for Human Rights reported that the Syrian air defenses responded to the attacks, while intercepting a huge number of missiles.

=== Economic crisis ===
In June 2020, the Syrian pound underwent a dramatic collapse. Analysts noted that a resolution to the current banking crisis in Lebanon might be crucial to restoring stability in Syria.

On 7–8 June, hundreds of protestors demonstrated against the government and against Russian and Iranian intervention in the country, in towns in southern Syria including As-Suwayda and Tafas in Daraa. On 7 June protests erupted in the Druze-majority city of Sweida, which had generally been regarded as supportive of Assad; however in this protest, groups of young men were chanting anti-government slogans and demanding the removal of Assad's government. The following day, hundreds of protesters gathered in front of the provincial governor's office regardless of the security forces that had been deployed in the area, calling for government allies Iran and Russia to vacate the country and chanting anti-government slogans. The state media ignored the protests.

The U.S. envoy to the international military intervention against ISIL, James Franklin Jeffrey, said that the collapse would be exacerbated due to sanctions, and offered to help President Bashar al-Assad if he agreed to meet certain conditions for political reform.

On 10 June, hundreds of protesters returned to the streets of Sweida for the fourth consecutive day, as the Syrian pound plummeted to LS 3,000 to the US dollar. On 11 June, Prime Minister Imad Khamis was dismissed by President Bashar al-Assad, amid anti-government protests over deteriorating economic conditions.

Some analysts began to raise concerns that Assad might be on the verge of losing power; but that any such collapse in the regime might cause conditions to worsen, as the result might be mass chaos, rather than an improvement in political or economic conditions. Russia continued to expand its influence and military role in the areas of Syria where the main military conflict was occurring.

Syrian state media reported that on 14 June, at a conference in Damascus between the Syrian government and business leaders, a number of business leaders agreed to a plan to reduce prices on important consumer staples and necessities, including food and clothing. Meanwhile, Syrian media outlets alleged that Turkish forces were imposing Turkish currency over areas of northern Syria.

=== Sanctions and international actions ===
Analysts noted that the upcoming implementation of new heavy sanctions under the US Caesar Act could devastate the Syrian economy, ruin any chances of recovery, destroy regional stability, and do nothing but destabilize the entire region. The first new sanctions were due to take effect on 17 June with additional sanctions implemented in August, in three different groups. There were increasing reports that food is becoming difficult to find, the country's economy was under severe pressure, and the whole regime could collapse due to the sanctions.

Some experts and some major Western media outlets noted the potential adverse effects on the population; e.g. the Associated Press noted that the sanctions could "be a heavy blow to a country where eight out of 10 people make less than $100 a month." The sanctions were designed to discourage any organizations from providing aid to help in Syria's reconstruction. Under this legislation, the US could penalize any organization that invests in certain economic sectors of Syria, or that lends any money to the Syrian government.

The provisions of the legislation are as follows:

On and after the date that is 180 days after the date of the enactment of this Act, the President shall impose the sanctions described in subsection (b) with respect to a foreign person if the President determines that the foreign person, on or after such date of enactment, knowingly engages in an activity described in paragraph (2).

(2) ACTIVITIES DESCRIBED.—A foreign person engages in an activity described in this paragraph if the foreign person—

(A) knowingly provides significant financial, material, or technological support to, or knowingly engages in a significant transaction with—

(i) the Government of Syria (including any entity owned or controlled by the Government of Syria) or a senior political figure of the Government of Syria;

(ii) a foreign person that is a military contractor, mercenary, or a paramilitary force knowingly operating in a military capacity inside Syria for or on behalf of the Government of Syria, the Government of the Russian Federation, or the Government of Iran; or

(iii) a foreign person subject to sanctions pursuant to the International Emergency Economic Powers Act (50 U.S.C. 1701 et seq.) with respect to Syria or any other provision of law that imposes sanctions with respect to Syria;

(B) knowingly sells or provides significant goods, services, technology, information, or other support that significantly facilitates the maintenance or expansion of the Government of Syria's domestic production of natural gas, petroleum, or petroleum products;

(C) knowingly sells or provides aircraft or spare aircraft parts that are used for military purposes in Syria for or on behalf of the Government of Syria to any foreign person operating in an area directly or indirectly controlled by the Government of Syria or foreign forces associated with the Government of Syria;

(D) knowingly provides significant goods or services associated with the operation of aircraft that are used for military purposes in Syria for or on behalf of the Government of Syria to any foreign person operating in an area described in subparagraph (C); or

(E) knowingly, directly or indirectly, provides significant construction or engineering services to the Government of Syria.

(3) SENSE OF CONGRESS.—It is the sense of Congress that, in implementing this section, the President should consider financial support under paragraph (2)(A) to include the provision of loans, credits, or export credits.

As early as January, Joshua Landis, director of the University of Oklahoma's Center for Middle East Studies Program, noted the adverse effects the sanctions would have on ordinary Syrians, and questioned whether the sanctions would making any real impact on improving political conditions, or counteracting Syrian government excesses against human rights. He stated "The act will severely delay the effort to rebuild after the war or to provide Syrians with electricity, heating, cooking gas, and other basic commodities needed for existence,....America's sanctions are not smart, They go after entire industries and particularly those that are most essential to providing state services, such as energy."

Analyst Julien Barnes-Dacey, director of the Middle East and North Africa Programme at the European Council on Foreign Relations, said:

“Assad is absolutely the prime driver of Syria's ongoing collapse. [But] the US position now appears to be fundamentally driven by great power politics and the goal of ensuring that Russia and Iran can't claim a win. My fear is that Caesar will achieve the exact opposite of its stated goals, fuelling the worst impulses of the Syrian regime and wider conflict. The US self-declared maximum pressure campaign aims to bring the regime to its knees and force its backers to concede defeat but the regime knows how to brutally hold onto power and it's clear that its key backers aren't for moving.

“The Syrian people have been brutalised for a decade now and the country is devastated by conflict but we appear to be staring into the precipice of a dangerous new stage of the conflict ... which risks a devastating new unravelling.”

Russia publicly stated that it would support the existing government of Syria. Russia provided mediation between Turkish and Syrian forces, to avert conflict between the two countries on the ground in Syria. Russian forces also carried out joint patrols with Turkish forces, creating a commonality of interest between the Syrian and Turkish governments.

Russia and the United States continuously argued publicly over the role played by each country in Syrian politics. Russia noted that its military presence had the approval of Syria's government. The Russian Ambassador, Alexander Yevimov, said that Russia would seek to help Syria to recover and to develop its economy positively.

Some analysts said that Assad would need support from major Sunni countries to stay in power, and that he would need the US to facilitate such support.

Syria's Ambassador to the United Nations, Bashar Jaafari, asked the UN for assistance, and said that sanctions by the US and the EU were unfairly harming the general population of Syria.

== July ==
According to Middle East Monitor, on 4 July, 20 Russian soldiers took control of Al-Ward, a major oil field in Abu Kamal countryside, after expelling the Syrian government military security personnel from it. Later, Russian forces deployed 15 military vehicles in the field, raised barricades and fortified its surroundings with heavy machine guns.

On 9 July, Russia and China failed in a second U.N. Security Council bid to cut aid access to Syria from Turkey, and the council would now vote on a last-ditch attempt to extend approval for cross-border aid deliveries before it expires on 10 July.

On 14 July, a joint Russian-Turkish patrol was attacked by a SVBIED, injuring several Russian and Turkish soldiers. Also, five civilians were believed to have been wounded during the explosion, according to civil defense groups. The Russians responded by carrying out several airstrikes against rebel positions in greater Idlib.

On 15 July, unknown aircraft, suspected to be Russian, carried out airstrikes on the city of al-Bab, controlled by the Syrian National Army and Turkey. An apartment complex was destroyed in the attack. One civilian was killed and at least 10 others were injured in the airstrikes. It was the first airstrike on the town since it was captured from ISIL in 2017.

On 16 July, an unknown UAV suspected to be Turkish carried out a strike against a Russian coordination point south of Al-Darbasiyah, which is controlled by the SDF but with Syrian Army and Russian military police forces present. Two Russian soldiers, one SAA member and two members of the Asayish were injured in the strike.

According to the SOHR, on 17 July, the Syrian National Army was put on high alert and reinforced checkpoints and frontlines amid flyovers by unknown jets.

On 19 July, a car bomb exploded in Azaz, leaving five dead and 43 wounded, according to Turkish state media. Among the wounded victims, 15 civilians who were in critical condition were reportedly rushed to Kilis, a city across the Turkish border, in order to receive medical attention. Separately, in northwestern Syria's Afrin, 13 people alongside children were said to have been wounded also in a terror attack.

== August–September ==
On 17 August, Syrian forces reportedly clashed with US troops in northern Syria close to the Turkish border, which resulted in the death of one Syrian. Two other Syrian soldiers were said to have been injured during the clash, state media added.

On 26 September, a car bombing in Ras al-Ayn left at least 7 people dead and another 10 were injured.

On 30 September, dozens of Syrians demonstrated in Idlib city, to mark five years of Russia's intervention in the civil war, and stood amid the rubble of houses destroyed by Russian bombing raising slogans such as "the Russian occupiers must leave" and "Putin and his warplanes destroyed the most ancient civilization in history".

== October ==
On 5 October, Oman became the first Persian Gulf country to reinstate its ambassador in Syria.

On 6 October a truck bombing killed at least 18 people and injured another 40 in al-Bab, Aleppo Governorate, Syria.

According to Middle East Monitor, on 12 October, Syrian government forces from the National Defence Forces, in cooperation with the Republican Guard, attacked and seized the Al-Ward oil field in the eastern governorate of Deir Ez-Zor from the Iranian militias belonging to the 47th Iranian Division which fled the area.

According to Middle East Monitor, on 15 October, U.S. forces conducted a drone strike against Al-Qaeda in the vicinity of Idlib, killing two senior members in the first drone strike by the U.S. military against the group in Syria since mid-September 2019.

According to Middle East Monitor, on 21 October, a Russian airstrike targeting civilian settlements in al-Rami village in southern Idlib province, injuring five civilians including two children.

According to Middle East Monitor, on 22 October, US-led coalition drones targeted a meeting arranged by an ex-ISIS commander with the participation of Hurras al Din members in the village of Jakara in the Salqin area of Idlib, killing at least 23 persons including 17 jihadist fighters (among them, seven senior leaders of Al-Qaeda) and 6 civilians.

On 23 October, SOHR and government sources reported that Russian missiles targeted an oil market controlled by Turkish backed rebels, between the villages of Al-Kousa and Ain Al-Bayda in Jarabulus countryside, Aleppo Governorate, killing 7 persons and injuring 15 more.

On 26 October, Russian warplanes targeted a training camp of Faylaq al-Sham, a Turkish-backed rebel group, near Kafr Takharim in Idlib Governorate. The strike killed 78 fighters and wounded more than 90. The head of the Syrian Observatory for Human Rights called the strike the heaviest attack since the beginning of the ceasefire.

== November ==
On 18 November, an airstrike was launched in Syria by the Israeli military, which resulted in the death of three soldiers and one other injured. The air strikes were said to have been carried out after the discovery of roadside bombs along the border in the Golan Heights, according to the Israeli military. Iranian and Syrian targets within Syria, were the targets of the attack, as military compounds, headquarters and storage facilities were hit by the Israeli IDF fighter jets. According to the Syrian Observatory for Human Rights, the number of those killed in the attack had reached at least 10 people.

On 22 November, a week after the death of Walid al-Moallem, Syrian President Bashar al-Assad has designated Faisal Mekdad as Syria's new foreign minister. The position of deputy foreign minister however, was given to the present ambassador to the United Nations, Bashar al-Jaafari. Also, a high ranking Foreign Ministry official, Bassam Sabbagh replaced Bashar Ja’afari as the UN ambassador.

On 23 November, heavy clashes between Turkey-backed fighters and Kurdish fighters in Ayn Issa resulted in the death of at least 11 fighters, according to SOHR, which said that despite the 11 Turkey-backed fighters who were killed, an unidentified number of SDF fighters were also killed or injured.

Separately, two explosions occurred in the towns of Afrin and al-Bab, which are both controlled by Turkey-backed fighters, according to the Syrian Observatory for Human Rights. In the explosion which took place in Al-Bab city, at least five people were reportedly killed, with 20 others injured. Another explosion hit a busy street in Aleppo's Afrin, just a few hours after the explosion in al-Bab, killing two people and 15 others injured. However, there has been no claim of responsibility for either of the blasts, according to the Daily Sabah.

On 25 November, following recent rains in the northern parts of Syria, which destroyed hundreds of tents in displacement camps in Idlib and Aleppo, the United Nations (UN) has revealed that aid is urgently needed for 3 million Syrian refugees.

== December ==
On 2 December, Lebanon's al-Akhbar newspaper reported that the SDF managed to ambush Turkish-backed forces, killing 30 fighters.

On 11 December, the Organisation for the Prohibition of Chemical Weapons (OPCW) reported to the UN Security Council that Syria's implementation of the Chemical Weapons Convention cannot be considered "accurate and complete."

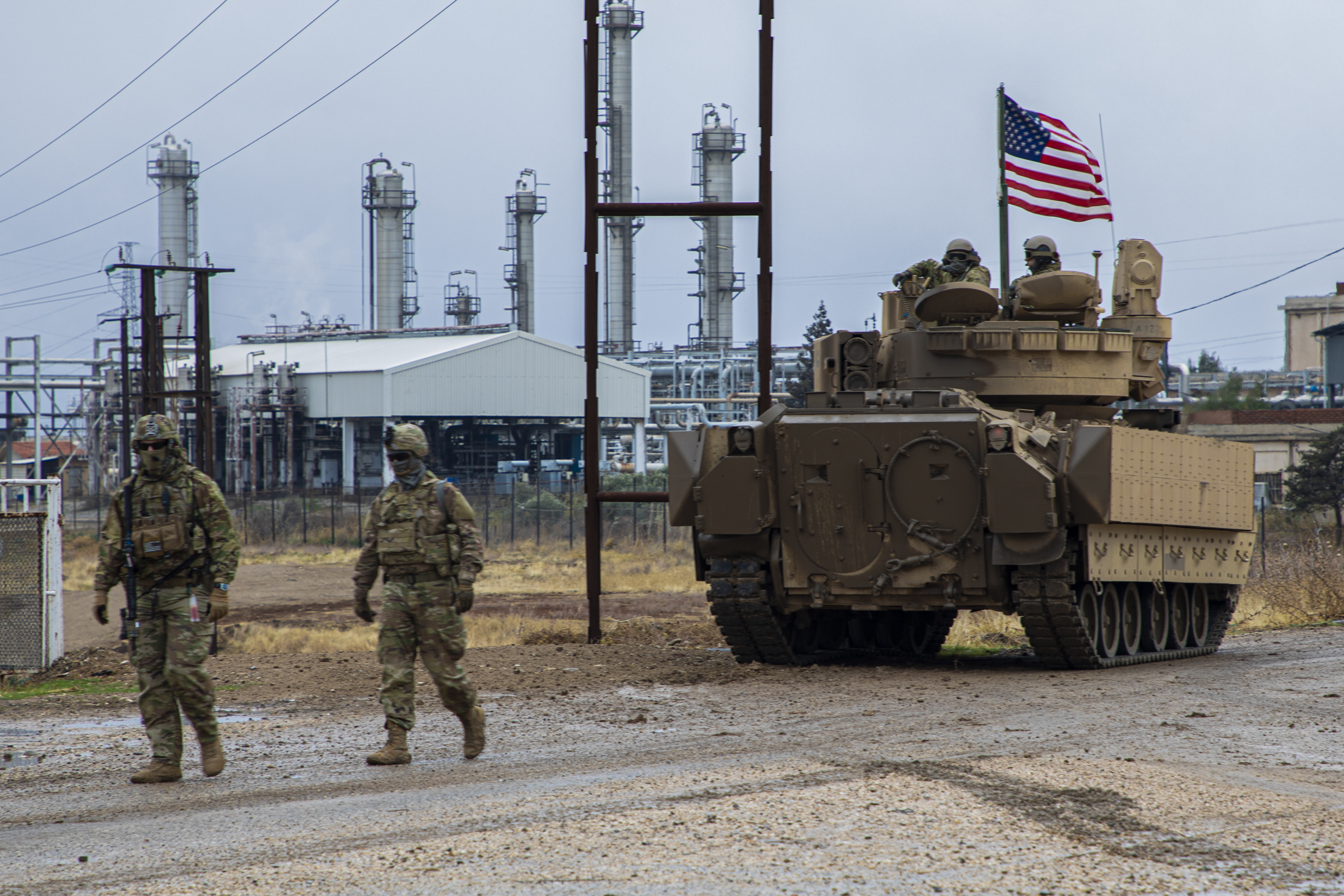
U.S. soldiers guard a refinery in northeastern Syria, 16 December 2020

On 25 December, Syrian Arab News Agency (SANA), the state news agency, reported that air strikes targeted Masyaf in the western province of Hama, but that Syrian air defenses were able to intercept the missiles. At least six pro-Iranian militia fighters were reported to have been killed in Hama province, according to the Syrian Observatory for Human Rights, which also said that the air strikes were launched from the Lebanaese airspace. Satellite images suggested that four buildings for manufacturing weapons were damaged during the air strikes. According to SANA, just a day before the attack, two sites in southern Syria had been reported to have been targeted by Israel. Despite Israel being known to have targeted the Masyaf military compound many times in the past, there was no immediate comment from Israel regarding this attack.

On 30 December, a Syrian military official accused Israel of a missile strike on a military unit in Damascus, close to the Zabadani Valley. One Syrian soldier was said to have been killed during the attack, leaving three others injured. According to the Syrian military, the attack was launched from Northern Galilee. Apart from the attack carried out in the area of a-Zabadani, SANA said another defense battery in the western part of Damascus was targeted by the Israeli Air Force. As the year ended, Israel said it had hit 50 targets in Syria in the course of 2020 including government, Iranian and Hezbollah forces.

On 31 December, a Syrian Army convoy south of Deir ez-Zor was ambushed by ISIL insurgents, leaving at least 37 Syrian Army soldiers dead and wounding several others. SOHR said it was one of the deadliest attacks committed by ISIS since the fall of the caliphate in March 2019. SANA said that 25 civilians were killed during the attack, but SOHR and local sources put the death toll much higher, with local sources saying over 30 members of the elite 4th Division were killed. ISIL issued a statement claiming responsibility for the bus attack. The group maintained that it had killed 40 Syrian army soldiers during the attack, while leaving six others seriously injured.

== See also ==
- COVID-19 pandemic in Syria
- 2020 in Syria
- 2020 in politics and government
