= Taladah =

Taladah تلعادة
- Village
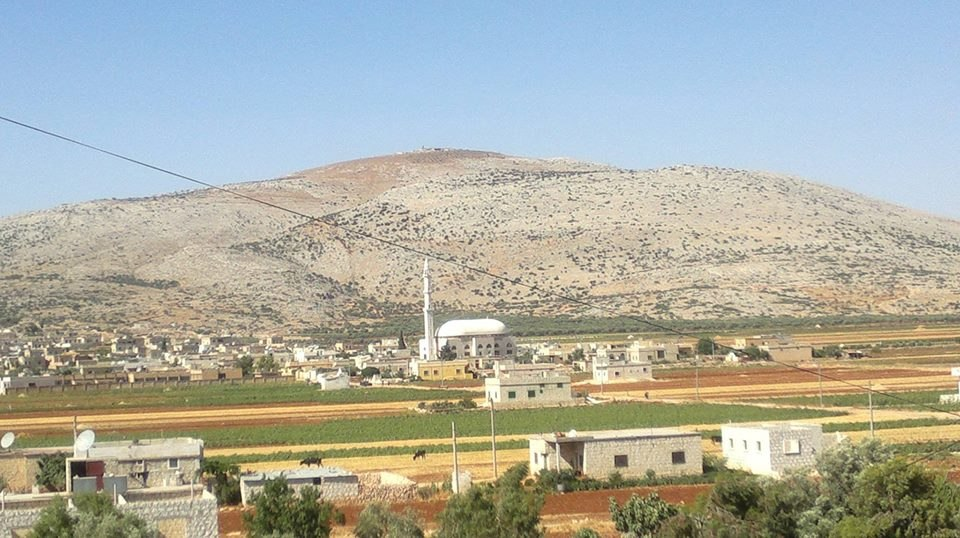

- Location within Syria
- Coordinates: 36°15′5″N 36°48′4″E
- Country: Syria
- Governorate: Idlib
- District: Harem
- Subdistrict: al-Dana

Population (2004)
  - Total: 5,599
- Time zone: UTC+2 (EET)
  - Summer (DST): UTC+3 (EEST)

Taladah (Arabic: تلعادة also spelled Tell Adah) (Note: Also known as Tell Aghdi.) is a village in Syria, administratively part of Idlib Governorate. Nearby localities include Turmanin to the southeast, al-Dana to the southwest and Darat Izza to the northeast. According to the Syria Central Bureau of Statistics (CBS), Talaadah had a population of 5,599 in 2004.

Taladah contains a large Byzantine-era monastery celebrated until the Middle Ages. In 400 CE, St. Simeon Stylites started his ascetic career there. Taladah remained a relatively important Christian site following the Muslim conquest of Syria in the 630s. A Syriac inscription dating to 941 was discovered among the ruins. Taladah was captured by the Crusaders under Tancred in 1104.

== Bibliography ==
- Boulanger, Robert (1966). The Middle East, Lebanon, Syria, Jordan, Iraq, Iran. Hachette.
- van Berchem, Max (1902). Notes sur les croisades (in French). Imprimerie nationale.
