= Ras Elhisn =

Coordinates: 36.0725°N 36.4556°E

Ras Elhisn راس الحصن
- Village
- Location in Syria
- Country: Syria
- Governorate: Idlib
- District: Harem District
- Subdistrict: Qurqania Nahiyah

Population (2004)
  - Total: 985
- Time zone: UTC+2 (EET)
  - Summer (DST): UTC+3 (EEST)
- City Qrya Pcode: C4167

Ras Elhisn (Arabic: راس الحصن) is a Syrian village located in Qurqania Nahiyah in Harem District, Idlib. According to the Syria Central Bureau of Statistics (CBS), Ras Elhisn had a population of 985 in the 2004 census.
