= Ariba, Idlib =

Ariba, Idlib عريبا
- Village
- Location in Syria
- Country: Syria
- Governorate: Idlib
- District: Harem District
- Subdistrict: Harem Nahiyah

Population (2004)
  - Total: 575
- Time zone: UTC+2 (EET)
  - Summer (DST): UTC+3 (EEST)
- City Qrya Pcode: C4114

Ariba, Idlib (Arabic: عريبا) is a Syrian village located in Harem Nahiyah in Harem District, Idlib. According to the Syria Central Bureau of Statistics (CBS), Ariba, Idlib had a population of 575 in the 2004 census.
