= Boz Ghaz =

Coordinates: 35.7972°N 36.1864°E

Boz Ghaz بوز غاز
- Village
- Location in Syria
- Country: Syria
- Governorate: Idlib
- District: Harem District
- Subdistrict: Qurqania Nahiyah

Population (2004)
  - Total: 631
- Time zone: UTC+2 (EET)
  - Summer (DST): UTC+3 (EEST)
- City Qrya Pcode: C4166

Boz Ghaz (Arabic: بوز غاز) is a Syrian village located in Qurqania Nahiyah in Harem District, Idlib. According to the Syria Central Bureau of Statistics (CBS), Boz Ghaz had a population of 631 in the 2004 census.
