= Kafr Hind =

Coordinates: 36°05′N 36°26′E

Kafr Hind كفر هند
- Village
- Location in Syria
- Country: Syria
- Governorate: Idlib
- District: Harem District
- Subdistrict: Salqin Nahiyah

Area
  - Total: 527 ha (1,300 acres)

Population (2004)
  - Total: 1,073
  - Density: 204/km^{2} (527/sq mi)
- Time zone: UTC+2 (EET)
  - Summer (DST): UTC+3 (EEST)
- City Qrya Pcode: C4151

Kafr Hind (Arabic: كفر هند) is a Syrian village located in Salqin Nahiyah in Harem District, Idlib. According to the Syria Central Bureau of Statistics (CBS), Kafr Hind had a population of 1,073 in the 2004 census. Most of its residents work in agriculture, cultivating fruit trees, olives and tobacco.
