= Besnaya - Bseineh =

Besnaya - Bseineh بسنيا بسينة
- Village
- Location in Syria
- Coordinates: 36°10′38″N 36°29′24″E
- Country: Syria
- Governorate: Idlib
- District: Harem District
- Subdistrict: Harem Nahiyah

Population (2004)
  - Total: 1,034
- Time zone: UTC+2 (EET)
  - Summer (DST): UTC+3 (EEST)
- City Qrya Pcode: C4116

Besnaya - Bseineh (Arabic: بسنيا بسينة) is a Syrian village located in Harem Nahiyah in Harem District, Idlib. According to the Syria Central Bureau of Statistics (CBS), Besnaya - Bseineh had a population of 1034 in the 2004 census.

== History ==
On 6 February 2023, a large block of residential and commercial buildings collapsed in the Turkey–Syria earthquake.
