= Bozanti, Idlib =

Bozanti, Idlib بوزانطي
- Village
- Location in Syria
- Country: Syria
- Governorate: Idlib
- District: Harem District
- Subdistrict: Salqin Nahiyah

Population (2004)
  - Total: 98
- Time zone: UTC+2 (EET)
  - Summer (DST): UTC+3 (EEST)
- City Qrya Pcode: C4144

Bozanti, Idlib or Bazinta (Arabic: بوزانطي) is a Syrian village located in Salqin Nahiyah in Harem District, Idlib. According to the Syria Central Bureau of Statistics (CBS), Bozanti, Idlib had a population of 98 in the 2004 census.
