= Radwa =

Coordinates: 36.1550°N 36.6278°E

Radwa رضوة
- Village
- Location in Syria
- Country: Syria
- Governorate: Idlib
- District: Harem District
- Subdistrict: Qurqania Nahiyah

Population (2004)
  - Total: 567
- Time zone: UTC+2 (EET)
  - Summer (DST): UTC+3 (EEST)
- City Qrya Pcode: C4169

Radwa (Arabic: رضوة) is a Syrian village located in Qurqania Nahiyah in Harem District, Idlib. According to the Syria Central Bureau of Statistics (CBS), Radwa had a population of 567 in the 2004 census.
