= Helleh =

Coordinates: 36.0947°N 36.5475°E

Helleh حلة
- Village
- Location in Syria
- Country: Syria
- Governorate: Idlib
- District: Harem District
- Subdistrict: Kafr Takharim Nahiyah

Population (2004)
  - Total: 277
- Time zone: UTC+2 (EET)
  - Summer (DST): UTC+3 (EEST)
- City Qrya Pcode: C4155

Helleh (Arabic: حلة) is a Syrian village located in Kafr Takharim Nahiyah in Harem District, Idlib. According to the Syria Central Bureau of Statistics (CBS), Helleh had a population of 277 in the 2004 census. Its inhabitants are Druze.
