= Betiya =

Betiya بتيا
- Village
- Country: Syria
- Governorate: Idlib
- District: Harem District
- Subdistrict: Salqin Nahiyah

Population (2004)
  - Total: 683
- Time zone: UTC+2 (EET)
  - Summer (DST): UTC+3 (EEST)
- City Qrya Pcode: C4147

Betiya (Arabic: بتيا) is a Syrian village located in Salqin Nahiyah in Harem District, Idlib. According to the Syria Central Bureau of Statistics (CBS), Betiya had a population of 683 in the 2004 census.
