= Mira Shaq =

Mira Shaq ميرا سحاق
- Village
- Country: Syria
- Governorate: Idlib
- District: Harem District
- Subdistrict: Harem Nahiyah

Population (2004)
  - Total: 61
- Time zone: UTC+2 (EET)
  - Summer (DST): UTC+3 (EEST)
- City Qrya Pcode: C4118

Mira Shaq (Arabic: ميرا سحاق) is a Syrian village located in Harem Nahiyah in Harem District, Idlib. According to the Syria Central Bureau of Statistics (CBS), Mira Shaq had a population of 61 in the 2004 census.
