= Aqrabat, Idlib =

Coordinates: 36.2706°N 36.7083°E

Aqrabat, Idlib عقربات
- Village
- Location in Syria
- Country: Syria
- Governorate: Idlib
- District: Harem District
- Subdistrict: Al-Dana Nahiyah

Population (2004)
  - Total: 388
- Time zone: UTC+2 (EET)
  - Summer (DST): UTC+3 (EEST)
- City Qrya Pcode: C4127

Aqrabat, Idlib (Arabic: عقربات) is a Syrian village located in Al-Dana Nahiyah in Harem District, Idlib. According to the Syria Central Bureau of Statistics (CBS), Aqrabat, Idlib had a population of 388 in the 2004 census.
