= Hezreh =

Hazrah حزرة
- Village
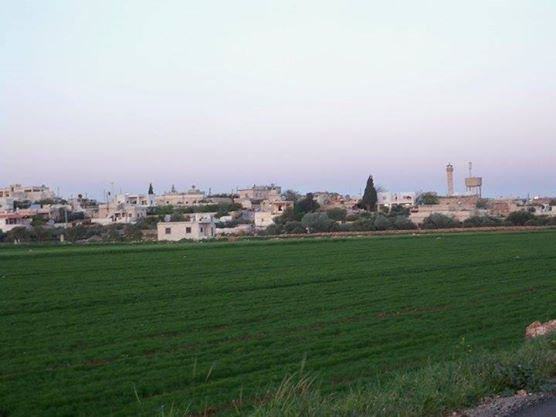

- Location in Syria Hazrah on google maps
- Coordinates: 36°13′58″N 36°47′26″E
- Country: Syria
- Governorate: Idlib
- District: Harem District
- Subdistrict: Al-Dana Nahiyah

Population (2004)
  - Total: 631
- Time zone: UTC+2 (EET)
  - Summer (DST): UTC+3 (EEST)
- City Qrya Pcode: C4120

Hazrah (Arabic: حزرة) is a Syrian village located in Al-Dana Nahiyah in Harem District, Idlib. According to the Syria Central Bureau of Statistics (CBS), Hazrah had a population of 631 in the 2004 census.
