= Kafr Mu =

Coordinates: 36°12′N 36°32′E

Kafr Mu كفر مو
- Village
- Location in Syria
- Country: Syria
- Governorate: Idlib
- District: Harem District
- Subdistrict: Harem Nahiyah

Population (2004)
  - Total: 62
- Time zone: UTC+2 (EET)
  - Summer (DST): UTC+3 (EEST)
- City Qrya Pcode: C4119

Kafr Mu (Arabic: كفر مو) is a Syrian village located in Harem Nahiyah in Harem District, Idlib. According to the Syria Central Bureau of Statistics (CBS), Kafr Mu had a population of 62 in the 2004 census.
