= Jadeen =

Jadeen جدعين
- Village
- Location in Syria
- Coordinates: 36°8′24″N 36°30′40″E
- Country: Syria
- Governorate: Idlib
- District: Harem District
- Subdistrict: Kafr Takharim Nahiyah

Population (2004)
  - Total: 277
- Time zone: UTC+2 (EET)
  - Summer (DST): UTC+3 (EEST)
- City Qrya Pcode: C4156

Jadeen (Arabic: جدعين) is a Syrian village located in Kafr Takharim Nahiyah in Harem District, Idlib. According to the Syria Central Bureau of Statistics (CBS), Jadeen had a population of 277 in the 2004 census. It is a Druze village of the Jabal al-Sumaq region.
