= Biret =

Biret may refer to:

== People ==
- Biret Tavman (born 1966), a Turkish textile artist
- İdil Biret (born 1941), a Turkish concert pianist

== Places ==
=== Syria ===
- Biret Armanaz (بيرة ارمناز), a village in Harem District, Idlib Governorate
- Biret Eljabal (بيرة الجبل), a village in al-Suqaylabiyah District, Hama Governorate
- Birat al-Jurd or Birat al-Jard (بيرة الجرد), a village in Masyaf District, Hama Governorate

== See also ==
- Biret International SA v Council of the European Union, a 2003 legal appeal at the European Court of Justice regarding import restrictions on meat products
- Biretta, a square cap with three or four peaks or horns worn by some clergy and some law advocates
- Beretta, an Italian firearms manufacturer
- The dictionary definition of biret at Wiktionary
