= Hir Jamus Kabir =

Hir Jamus Kabir حير جاموس كبير
- Village
- Location in Syria
- Coordinates: 36.1894°N 36.4206°E
- Country: Syria
- Governorate: Idlib
- District: Harem District
- Subdistrict: Salqin Nahiyah

Population (2004)
  - Total: 833
- Time zone: UTC+2 (EET)
  - Summer (DST): UTC+3 (EEST)
- City Qrya Pcode: C4141

Hir Jamus Kabir (Arabic: حير جاموس كبير) is a Syrian village located in Salqin Nahiyah in Harem District, Idlib. According to the Syria Central Bureau of Statistics (CBS), Hir Jamus Kabir had a population of 833 in the 2004 census.
