= Sardin =

Sardin سردين
- Village
- Location in Syria
- Coordinates: 36.145521°N 36.591770°E
- Country: Syria
- Governorate: Idlib
- District: Harem District
- Subdistrict: Qurqania Nahiyah

Population (2004)
  - Total: 517
- Time zone: UTC+2 (EET)
  - Summer (DST): UTC+3 (EEST)
- City Qrya Pcode: C4165

Sardin (Arabic: سردين) is a Syrian village located in Qurqania Nahiyah in Harem District, Idlib. According to the Syria Central Bureau of Statistics (CBS), Sardin had a population of 517 in the 2004 census.
