= Saidiyeh, Idlib =

Coordinates: 36.0675°N 36.4236°E

Saidiyeh, Idlib السعيدية
- Village
- Location in Syria
- Country: Syria
- Governorate: Idlib
- District: Harem District
- Subdistrict: Salqin Nahiyah

Population (2004)
  - Total: 1,050
- Time zone: UTC+2 (EET)
  - Summer (DST): UTC+3 (EEST)
- City Qrya Pcode: C4138

Saidiyeh, Idlib (Arabic: السعيدية) is a Syrian village located in Salqin Nahiyah in Harem District, Idlib. According to the Syria Central Bureau of Statistics (CBS), Saidiyeh, Idlib had a population of 1,050 in the 2004 census.
