= Merat Elshalaf =

Coordinates: 36.1211°N 36.5925°E

Merat Elshalaf معراة الشلف
- Village
- Location in Syria
- Country: Syria
- Governorate: Idlib
- District: Harem District
- Subdistrict: Qurqania Nahiyah

Population (2004)
  - Total: 1,600
- Time zone: UTC+2 (EET)
  - Summer (DST): UTC+3 (EEST)
- City Qrya Pcode: C4171

Merat Elshalaf (Arabic: معراة الشلف) is a Syrian village located in Qurqania Nahiyah in Harem District, Idlib. According to the Syria Central Bureau of Statistics (CBS), Meraf Elshalaf had a population of 1600 in the 2004 census.
