= Kafr Hum =

Kafr Hum كفرحوم
- Village
- Location in Syria
- Coordinates: 36°11′49″N 36°28′41″E
- Country: Syria
- Governorate: Idlib
- District: Harem District
- Subdistrict: Harem Nahiyah

Population (2004)
  - Total: 1,143
- Time zone: UTC+2 (EET)
  - Summer (DST): UTC+3 (EEST)
- City Qrya Pcode: C4117

Kafr Hum (Arabic: كفرحوم) is a Syrian village located in Harem Nahiyah in Harem District, Idlib. According to the Syria Central Bureau of Statistics (CBS), Kafr Hum had a population of 1,143 in the 2004 census.
