= Millis, Syria =

Millis ملَس
- Village
- Location in Syria
- Coordinates: 36.002986°N 36.487578°E
- Country: Syria
- Governorate: Idlib
- District: Harem
- Subdistrict: Armanaz
- Elevation: 234 m (768 ft)

Population (2004 census)
  - Total: 2,938
- Time zone: UTC+2 (EET)
  - Summer (DST): UTC+3 (EEST)

Millis (Arabic: ملس) is a village in northwestern Syria, administratively part of Armanaz Subdistrict of Harem District in Idlib Governorate. It lies about 18 km from the city of Idlib and around 35 km from Salqin, near the Syrian–Turkish border. According to the Syria Central Bureau of Statistics (CBS), Millis had a population of 2,938 in the 2004 census.

Agriculture forms the basis of the local economy, with wheat, vegetable and olive cultivation as well as livestock farming common in the surrounding Armanaz Subdistrict.

== Syrian civil war ==
During the Syrian civil war, a hospital in Millis supported by the medical charity Médecins Sans Frontières (MSF) was destroyed by aerial bombing on 6 August 2016. The facility served around 70,000 people in the town and surrounding villages and received roughly 250 patients per day before the attack. The airstrikes killed four hospital staff members and nine other people, including women and children, and forced the hospital to close.
