= Kafrahlat Jallad =

Kafrahlat Jallad كفرحات جلاد
- Village
- Country: Syria
- Governorate: Idlib
- District: Harem District
- Subdistrict: Salqin Nahiyah

Population (2004)
  - Total: 233
- Time zone: UTC+2 (EET)
  - Summer (DST): UTC+3 (EEST)
- City Qrya Pcode: C4150

Kafrahlat Jallad (Arabic: كفرحات جلاد) is a Syrian village located in Salqin Nahiyah in Harem District, Idlib. According to the Syria Central Bureau of Statistics (CBS), Kafrahlat Jallad had a population of 233 in the 2004 census.
