= Ein Elbikara =

Ein Elbikara عين البكارة
- Village
- Country: Syria
- Governorate: Idlib
- District: Harem District
- Subdistrict: Salqin Nahiyah

Population (2004)
  - Total: 969
- Time zone: UTC+2 (EET)
  - Summer (DST): UTC+3 (EEST)
- City Qrya Pcode: C4136

Ein Elbikara (Arabic: عين البكارة) is a Syrian village located in Salqin Nahiyah in Harem District, Idlib. According to the Syria Central Bureau of Statistics (CBS), Ein Elbikara had a population of 969 in the 2004 census.
