= Burj Elnumra =

Burj Elnumra برج النمرة
- Village
- Country: Syria
- Governorate: Idlib
- District: Harem District
- Subdistrict: Al-Dana Nahiyah

Population (2004)
  - Total: 656
- Time zone: UTC+2 (EET)
  - Summer (DST): UTC+3 (EEST)
- City Qrya Pcode: C4128

Burj Elnumra (Arabic: برج النمرة) is a Syrian village in Al-Dana Nahiyah in Harem District, Idlib. According to the Syria Central Bureau of Statistics (CBS), it had a population of 656 in the 2004 census.
