= Hir Jamus Saghir =

Hir Jamus Saghir حير جاموس صغير
- Village
- Location in Syria
- Country: Syria
- Governorate: Idlib
- District: Harem District
- Subdistrict: Salqin Nahiyah

Population (2004)
  - Total: 432
- Time zone: UTC+2 (EET)
  - Summer (DST): UTC+3 (EEST)
- City Qrya Pcode: C4139

Hir Jamus Saghir (Arabic: حير جاموس صغير) is a Syrian village located in Salqin Nahiyah in Harem District, Idlib. According to the Syria Central Bureau of Statistics (CBS), Hir Jamus Saghir had a population of 432 in the 2004 census.
