= Tur Laha =

Coordinates: 36°13′N 36°35′E

Tur Laha طور لاها
- Village
- Location in Syria
- Country: Syria
- Governorate: Idlib
- District: Harem District
- Subdistrict: Qurqania Nahiyah

Population (2004)
  - Total: 177
- Time zone: UTC+2 (EET)
  - Summer (DST): UTC+3 (EEST)
- City Qrya Pcode: C4170

Tur Laha (Arabic: طور لاها) is a Syrian village located in Qurqania Nahiyah in Harem District, Idlib. According to the Syria Central Bureau of Statistics (CBS), Tur Laha had a population of 177 in the 2004 census.
