= Rabeeta =

Coordinates: 36.1575°N 36.6422°E

Rabeeta ربعيتا
- Village
- Location in Syria
- Country: Syria
- Governorate: Idlib
- District: Harem District
- Subdistrict: Qurqania Nahiyah

Population (2004)
  - Total: 383
- Time zone: UTC+2 (EET)
  - Summer (DST): UTC+3 (EEST)
- City Qrya Pcode: C4168

Rabeeta (Arabic: ربعيتا) is a Syrian village located in Qurqania Nahiyah in Harem District, Idlib. According to the Syria Central Bureau of Statistics (CBS), Rabeeta had a population of 383 in the 2004 census.
