= Kabta, Idlib =

Kabta, Idlib كبته
- Village
- Location in Syria
- Coordinates: 35°58′59″N 36°28′01″E
- Country: Syria
- Governorate: Idlib
- District: Harem District
- Subdistrict: Armanaz Nahiyah
- Elevation: 243 m (797 ft)

Population (2004)
  - Total: 1,229
- Time zone: UTC+2 (EET)
  - Summer (DST): UTC+3 (EEST)
- City Qrya Pcode: C4185

Kabta, Idlib (Arabic: كبته) is a Syrian village located in Armanaz Subdistrict in Harem District, Idlib. According to the Syria Central Bureau of Statistics (CBS), Kabta, Idlib had a population of 1229 in the 2004 census.

== Archeology ==
In September 2022, excavation works were reported at an archaeological site south of Kabta village. Excavation teams affiliated with Hay'at Tahrir al-Sham conducted digging operations using heavy machinery in search of antiquities in the area.
