= Al-Shiokh =

Coordinates: 36.103333°N 36.414444°E

Al-Shiokh الشيوخ
- Village
- Location in Syria
- Country: Syria
- Governorate: Idlib
- District: Harem District
- Subdistrict: Salquin Nahiyah

Population (2004)
  - Total: 331
- Time zone: UTC+2 (EET)
  - Summer (DST): UTC+3 (EEST)
- City Qrya Pcode: N/A

Al-Shiokh (Arabic: الشيوخ) is a Syrian village located in Salquin Nahiyah in Harem District, Idlib. According to the Syria Central Bureau of Statistics (CBS), Al-Shiokh had a population of 331 in the 2004 census.
