= Haj Jomaa =

Haj Jomaa حاج جمعة
- Village
- Location in Syria
- Coordinates: 36.0027°N 36.4685°E
- Country: Syria
- Governorate: Idlib
- District: Harem District
- Subdistrict: Armanaz subdistrict
- Elevation: 262 m (860 ft)

Population (2004)
  - Total: 154
- Time zone: UTC+2 (EET)
  - Summer (DST): UTC+3 (EEST)
- City Qrya Pcode: N/A

Haj Jomaa (Arabic: حاج جمعة) is a Syrian village located in Armanaz Subdistrict in Harem District, Idlib. According to the Syria Central Bureau of Statistics (CBS), Haj Jomaa had a population of 154 in the 2004 census. Within the Armanaz Subdistrict, Haj Jomaa is the smallest localities by population.

A 2021 report by the Syrian news outlet Hibr Press described the settlement as a rural community in the Ghab Plainwhose residents rely largely on livestock breeding, particularly sheep, goats and cattle. The report quoted the head of the village council, Jomaa al-Youssef, who stated that farmers collectively manage around 1,000 animals but face challenges due to high feed costs and limited support for livestock breeders.
