= Dweila =

Dweila الدويلة
- Village
- Location in Syria
- Coordinates: 36°02′54.0″N 36°27′07.0″E
- Country: Syria
- Governorate: Idlib
- District: Harem District
- Subdistrict: Armanaz Subdistrict
- Elevation: 773 m (2,536 ft)

Population (2004)
  - Total: 917
- Time zone: UTC+2 (EET)
  - Summer (DST): UTC+3 (EEST)
- City Qrya Pcode: C4182

Dweila (Arabic: الدويلة) is a village in Armanaz Subdistrict of Harem District in Idlib Governorate, north-western Syria, near the border with Turkey. According to the Syria Central Bureau of Statistics (CBS), Dweila had a population of 917 in the 2004 census. The village lies in the rural countryside surrounding the town of Armanaz, the administrative centre of the subdistrict.

Agriculture forms the backbone of the local economy, with crops such as wheat, olives and vegetables grown in the surrounding farmland.

During the Syrian civil war, the region became part of opposition-held north-western Syria and experienced constant airstrikes and clashes. On 26 October 2020, the nearby Jabal al-Dweila area was the site of a Russian airstrike targeting a training camp operated by the Turkish-backed rebel group Faylaq al-Sham, with reports estimating that between 35 and 78 fighters were killed.
