= Sheikh Yousef =

Sheikh Yousef الشيخ يوسف
- Village

Arab transcription(s)
  - English: "Sheikh (Leader) Joseph"
- Location in Syria
- Coordinates: 35°58′04″N 36°30′38″E
- Country: Syria
- Governorate: Idlib
- District: Harem District
- Subdistrict: Armanaz Nahiyah
- Elevation: 254 m (833 ft)

Population (2004)
  - Total: 2,831
- Time zone: UTC+2 (EET)
  - Summer (DST): UTC+3 (EEST)
- City Qrya Pcode: C4179

Sheikh Yousef (Arabic: الشيخ يوسف) is a Syrian village located in Armanaz Subdistrict in Harem District, Idlib Governorate. According to the Syria Central Bureau of Statistics (CBS), Sheikh Yousef had a population of 2831 in the 2004 census.

== Syrian Civil War ==
In 2017, three people were reportedly killed by an improvised explosive device on the road between Idlib city and Sheikh Yousef village. During the Syrian civil war, Russian and Syrian government airstrikes targeted areas across Idlib Governorate, including villages in the western Idlib countryside where Sheikh Yousef is located. Humanitarian reports have also documented bombardment and attacks affecting civilian infrastructure across Idlib Governorate during the conflict,
