= Atme =

Atme اطمه
- Town
- Location within Syria
- Coordinates: 36°18′40″N 36°41′11″E
- Country: Syria
- Governorate: Idlib
- District: Harem
- Subdistrict: Al-Dana

Population (2004 census)
  - Total: 2,255
- Time zone: UTC+2 (EET)
  - Summer (DST): UTC+3 (EEST)

Atme (Arabic: اطمه, romanized: ‘Aṭma, also spelled Atma, Atima, Atmeh) is a town in northern Syria, administratively part of the Idlib Governorate, located north of Idlib and just east of the border with Turkey. It lies southeast of Deir Ballut, south of Jindires, northwest of Qah and north of Sarmada and al-Dana. In the Syria Central Bureau of Statistics' 2004 census, it had a population of 2,255.

== History ==
The Olive Tree Camp is a refugee camp that emerged during the Syrian Civil War. According to Bianet, about 80,000 people live in tents in the camp. Since October 2013, internally displaced Syrians who failed to cross over to Turkey started settling between the olive trees. A new wave of refugees was triggered by the Syrian offensive in 2019.

A 150-year-old oak tree in Atme was cut down by members of ISIS in November 2013. They accused the locals of venerating the tree instead of God. The town was under the control of Hayat Tahrir al-Sham until its disbandment following the fall of the Assad Regime.

In February 2023, the town was hit by the 2023 Turkey–Syria earthquakes, leading to at least 11 deaths.

== Incidents ==
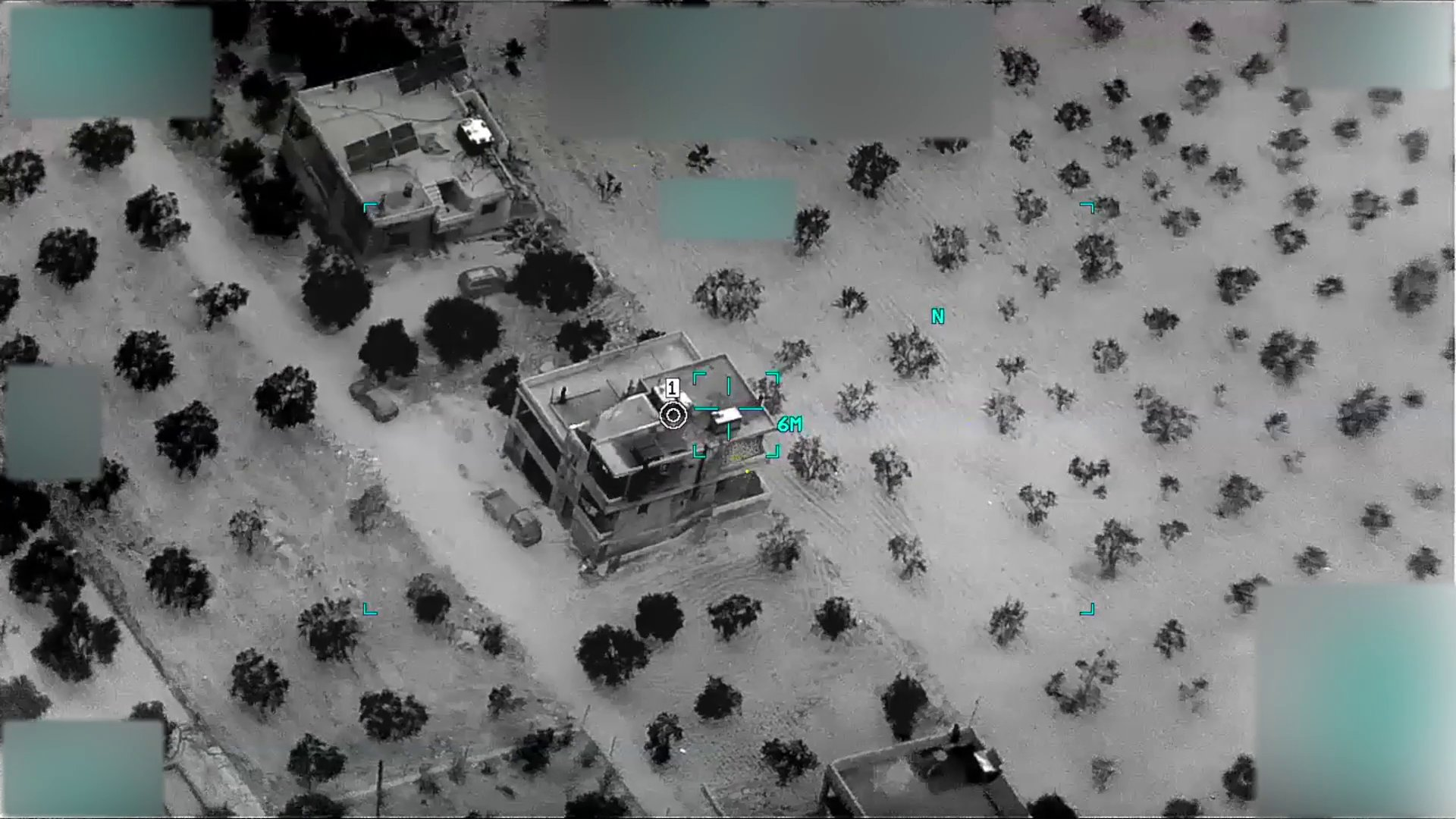
Quraishi's compound in Atme

IS leader Abu Ibrahim al-Qurashi killed himself during a raid by US special forces on a house in Atme on 3 February 2022. According to the Syrian Observatory for Human Rights, thirteen other people, including seven civilians, died during the raid, which was noted by the media for its intensity.

Many of the local residents were "shocked" about the presence of Quraishi in the town, including Quraishi's landlord, who was unaware that his tenant was the leader of IS.
