= Kuwaro =

Kuwaro كوارو
- Village
- Location in Syria
- Country: Syria
- Governorate: Idlib
- District: Harem District
- Subdistrict: Armanaz Nahiyah

Population (2004)
  - Total: 831
- Time zone: UTC+2 (EET)
  - Summer (DST): UTC+3 (EEST)
- City Qrya Pcode: C4183

Kuwaro (Arabic: كوارو) is a Syrian village located in Armanaz Nahiyah in Harem District, Idlib. According to the Syria Central Bureau of Statistics (CBS), Kuwaro had a population of 831 in the 2004 census.

== Archaeology ==
A cemetery dating back to the Roman period, featuring hypogea with adorned entrances, sprawled in ancient times across a 200-meter area on the slopes of Jebel Doueili, situated to the west and northwest of the village. Photographic evidence suggests the presence of hypogea excavated at various levels on the cliff face. Four of these hypogea bore inscriptions, with three dating back to the period between 221 and 235 AD.
