= Ghafar =

Ghafar الغفر
- Village
- Location in Syria
- Coordinates: 35°56′14″N 36°27′22″E
- Country: Syria
- Governorate: Idlib
- District: Harem District
- Subdistrict: Armanaz Subdistrict
- Elevation: 232 m (761 ft)

Population (2004)
  - Total: 2,090
- Time zone: UTC+2 (EET)
  - Summer (DST): UTC+3 (EEST)
- City Qrya Pcode: C4175

Ghafar (Arabic: الغفر) is a Syrian village located in Armanaz Subdistrict in Harem District, Idlib. According to the Syria Central Bureau of Statistics (CBS), Ghafar had a population of 2090 in the 2004 census. The village is located in the Sahl al-Rouj / western Idlib countryside, near localities including Tannariyah and Tayyibat al-Ism. Agriculture is an important part of the local economy, with crops such as olives, wheat and vegetables grown in the surrounding farmland.

During the Syrian civil war, the countryside of western Idlib experienced significant displacement as fighting and airstrikes forced civilians from other parts of Syria to flee toward opposition-held areas near the Turkish border. As a result, informal camps and temporary settlements developed across the region, including in and around Ghafar.

In December 2021, severe winter storms damaged displacement camps across north-western Syria. The strong winds affected 105 IDP sites and damaged or destroyed 1,484 tents, while also leading to flooding affecting 210 camps and destroying 4,916 tents, including 23 camps in the Armanaz subdistrict which includes Ghafar.
