= Bsaliya =

Bsaliya بسليا
- Village
- Location in Syria
- Coordinates: 35°58′17″N 36°29′36″E
- Country: Syria
- Governorate: Idlib
- District: Harem District
- Subdistrict: Armanaz Subdistrict

Population (2004)
  - Total: 924
- Time zone: UTC+2 (EET)
  - Summer (DST): UTC+3 (EEST)
- City Qrya Pcode: C4181

Bsaliya (Arabic: بساليا) is a Syrian village located in Armanaz Nahiyah of Harem District in Idlib Governorate, northwestern Syria. According to the Syria Central Bureau of Statistics (CBS), Bsaliya had a population of 924 in the 2004 census. The village lies in the northern countryside of Idlib Governorate near the Syrian–Turkish border.

During the Syrian civil war, internally displaced persons settled in camps settled in camps in the surrounding area. One such site is Wadi Bsaliya Camp near the village, where humanitarian organizations have distributed shelter materials and tents to displaced families.
