= Quneitra, Idlib =

Quneitra, Idlib القنيطرة
- Village
- Location in Syria
- Coordinates: 35°58′56″N 36°31′47″E
- Country: Syria
- Governorate: Idlib
- District: Harem District
- Subdistrict: Armanaz Nahiyah
- Elevation: 300 m (980 ft)

Population (2004)
  - Total: 450
- Time zone: UTC+2 (EET)
  - Summer (DST): UTC+3 (EEST)
- City Qrya Pcode: C4177

Quneitra, Idlib (Arabic: القنيطرة) is a Syrian village located in Armanaz Subdistrict in Harem District, Idlib. According to the Syria Central Bureau of Statistics (CBS), Quneitra, Idlib had a population of 450 in the 2004 census.

In 2023, the humanitarian organization Ihsan Relief and Development built a water station in al-Qunaitrah to provide clean drinking water for residents of the town and surrounding areas.
