= Armanaz =

Armanaz أَرْمَنَاز
- Town
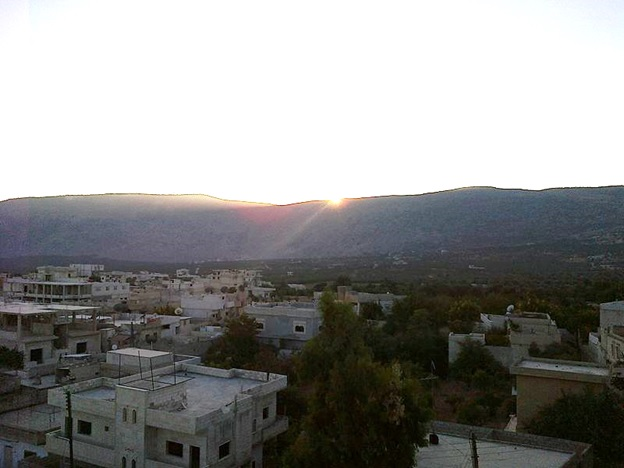

- Location within Syria
- Coordinates: 36°05′N 36°30′E
- Country: Syria
- Governorate: Idlib Governorate
- District: Harem District
- Nahiyah: Armanaz Nahiyah
- Occupation: Hayat Tahrir al-Sham
- Elevation: 340 m (1,120 ft)

Population (2004 census)
  - Total: 10,296
- Time zone: UTC+2 (EET)
  - Summer (DST): UTC+3 (EEST)

Armanaz (Arabic: أَرْمَنَاز, romanized: Armanāz) is a town in northwestern Syria, administratively part of the Harem District, in the Idlib Governorate. It is located 20 kilometers northwest of Idlib near the Syrian-Turkish borders. Nearby localities include Salqin, Harem and Kafr Takharim to the north and Idlib, Ma'arrat Misrin and Saraqib to the southeast.

According to the Syria Central Bureau of Statistics, Armanaz had a population of 10,296 in the 2004 census. Its inhabitants are predominantly Sunni Muslims. The town is the administrative center of the Armanaz Subdistrict (nahiyah), consisting of 12 villages with a combined population of 27,267.

Armanaz is well known for its glass-manufacturing industry. It is the only village in northern Syria that specializes in this artisan craft, which it has been specializing since ancient times. It is also well known for its olive groves, olive oil and pottery.

== History ==
=== Ancient period ===
The name "Armanaz" is of pre-Semitic origin. It may be the sight of the ancient Assyrian city of Tarmanazi. According to historian Carl Joham Lamm, ancient sources indicate that Armanaz was founded by glass workers from a town near Tyre (modern-day Lebanon) with the same name.

=== Medieval period ===
In 1098 the Muslim Seljuk ruler of Antioch, Yaghi-Siyan, was killed in Armanaz, then an estate of Maarrat Misrin, while escaping the city upon the capture of nearby Antioch by the Crusaders. Armanaz became a Crusader town known as "Emine" or "Eminas" during the 11th century. During Ayyubid rule in the early 13th-century, Syrian geographer Yaqut al-Hamawi wrote that the village Armanaz was "an ancient and small town, distant from Halab (Aleppo) about 5 leagues. They make here pots and drinking-vessels, red in colour, and very sweet to smell."

Medieval Muslim historian Izz al-Din ibn Shaddad al-Halabi mentioned Armanaz as one of 22 abandoned or ruined fortresses in the Aleppo region, likely destroyed during the Mongol invasions of Syria in the mid to late 13th century and was not rebuilt by the Mamluks who gained power in the region during that time.

=== Modern era ===
Map of Armanaz Subdistrict, in the Idlib Governorate.

During the anti-French revolt led by Ibrahim Hananu in 1919, Hananu's fighters administered Armanaz and by working with the former head of its municipality, levied taxes on landowners, livestock owners and farmers to support the rebel effort. From Armanaz, Hananu's authority extended to Harem, Jisr al-Shughur, Kafr Takharim and Idlib with the same process of taxation and administration being repeated in those municipalities.

In the early 1960s, it was a large village of approximately 3,000 people.

Following weeks of clashes in the summer of 2012, during the ongoing Syrian Civil War, opposition rebels captured Armanaz from the Syrian Army on 20 June.

== Bibliography ==
- Boulanger, Robert (1966). The Middle East, Lebanon, Syria, Jordan, Iraq, Iran. Hachette.
- Gelvin, James L. (1999). Divided Loyalties: Nationalism and Mass Politics in Syria at the Close of Empire. University of California Press. ISBN 0520210700.
- Litman, Enno (1949). Syria Publications of the Princeton University Archeological Expedions to Syria in 1904-5 and 1906 Division Iv Semitic Inscriptions. BRILL Archive.
- Carl Johan Lamm (1941). Oriental Glass of Mediaeval Date Found in Sweden and the Early History of Lustre-painting. Wahlström & Widstrand i.komm.
- le Strange, Guy (1890). Palestine Under the Moslems: A Description of Syria and the Holy Land from A.D. 650 to 1500. Committee of the Palestine Exploration Fund.
- Kate Raphael (2010). Muslim Fortresses in the Levant: Between Crusaders and Mongols. Taylor & Francis. ISBN 9780203845165.
