= Qah missile strike =

Massacre in Syria

- Part of the Iranian involvement in the Syrian civil war
- Location: 36°08′N 36°49′E; Qah, Idlib Governorate, Syria
- Date: 20 November 2019; ~7:30 PM (local time)
- Target: Qah refugee camp
- Attack type: missile strike
- Weapon: Cluster munitions
- Deaths: 15
- Injuries: 40
- Perpetrators: Syrian Arab Army (Iran) Iranian militias in Syria
- Motive: unknown

The Qah missile strike, known by the Syrian opposition and some Arab media sources as the Qah massacre, was a missile attack that took place on 20 November 2019. A surface-to-surface missile carrying cluster munitions launched by the Syrian Arab Army along with Iranian militias from defense laboratories south of Aleppo targeted a displaced persons camp in the village of Qah near the Syria-Turkey border. Fifteen civilians were killed, including six children.

== Background ==
On October 9, 2019, Turkey, along with the Syrian National Army, launched a military operation called Operation Peace Spring. They targeted Kurdish armed organizations in northern Syria. It enabled the Turkish army and factions of the Syrian armed opposition to control numerous villages and towns that were controlled by the Syrian Democratic Forces. Operation Peace Spring was condemned by many countries involved in the war in Syria, including France and the United States. Operation Peace Spring ended later, after the start of negotiations between Ankara and Washington and the reaching of a preliminary agreement for the withdrawal of Kurdish militias some kilometers away from the Turkish border.

After the Turkish-American agreement, which was followed by another Turkish-Russian agreement, the pace of clashes decreased in the northern regions of Syria, but the explosions and sporadic attacks did not stop. Meanwhile, Russian fighters and Syrian fighters continued to pound the "opposition areas" with rockets from time to time until the displaced persons camp was targeted in Qah on the evening of 20 November 2019 by a surface-to-surface missile loaded with bomblets, which caused many civilian casualties in the targeted area.

== Bombardment ==
=== Targeting ===
Around 7:30 pm on Wednesday, 20 November 2019 (local time), the sound of a large explosion was heard near the Syrian-Turkish border, before it became apparent that the explosion was caused by the targeting of Qah camp, north of Idlib, with a surface-to-surface missile carrying bomblets fired by the Syrian Army from the defense laboratories south of Aleppo. The strike immediately killed 9 civilians, including four children and two women, and wounded dozens. It also caused huge fires in the tents.

Two hours after the attack, some of the opposition factions targeted regime forces' sites in the vicinity of Aleppo with rockets, in response to the shelling that targeted the displaced persons camp in the town of Qah. The opposition factions focused in their response on the neighborhoods of Khaldiya, Nile Street, al-Shahba, and al-Hamdaniya, the 3000 apartments project, the 606 project, and the new Aleppo in the city of Aleppo, all of which are sites surrounding the Iranian observation point in the military academy west of the city. Later, light and intermittent clashes and mutual bombardment erupted on more than one axis, causing no casualties. Russian warplanes also targeted the town of Karsaah and the vicinity of the town of Al-Bara in Jabal Al-Zawiya in the southern countryside of Idlib with vacuum bombs.

=== The missile in use ===
Military analysts and weapons experts confirmed that the missile used in the bombing of the camp is the Soviet Tochka 9M79 ballistic missile, which has a range of 120 km. It was loaded with several cluster munitions, which caused large explosions and huge fires. The opposition factions also confirmed that the missile was launched from the Iranian base in Jabal Azzan in the southern countryside of Aleppo, which is 47 km from the camp, adding that the regime has launchers for this type of missile in defense factories near Azzan, which are less than 70 km from the camp.

=== Victims ===
The bombing of the camp caused the deaths of fifteen civilians, including six children, in addition to forty wounded, according to the statistics of the Civil Defense Organization, which issued a statement saying that its emergency teams dealt with a large number of victims. The seriously wounded were sent to Turkish hospitals, while those with slight injuries were treated in the field, stressing at the same time that the attack had led to the burning of many tents and partial destruction of the maternity facility, which specializes in treating women and children.

== Reactions ==
The United Nations condemned the bombing of the Qah displaced persons camp in the de-escalation zone in northern Syria and called it "horrific," while Mark Cutts, the UN Deputy Regional Coordinator for Syria, said, "I find it sickening that missiles hit vulnerable civilians, including elderly people, women and children sheltering in tents and makeshift shelters in a camp for internally displaced people." He called for a thorough investigation into the terrible incident and reiterated his demand for all conflicting parties to distinguish between civilians and combatants under international law.

Locally, the Syrian National Army condemned, in an official statement, "the regime and its militias targeting the displaced persons camp in the town of Qah in the northern countryside of Idlib ... This crime is added to the Assad regime's criminal record that has not stopped targeting civilians from the Syrian people," while the Syrian Civil Defense forces said the Syrian regime and its allies are responsible for committing the massacre in which dozens of people were killed and wounded, calling on the international community to take a firm stand regarding the daily violations of the regime and Russian forces and their allies against civilians.
