= Kata'ib Khattab al-Shishani =

Militant organization in Syria

- Founded: July 14, 2020
- Dates active: 2020 — 2025
- Dissolved: 29 January 2025
- Country: Syria
- Headquarters: Ariha
- Status: Possibly false
- Size: 50
- Wars: Syrian civil war; Turkish involvement in the Syrian civil war; Turkish military operation in Idlib Governorate

Kata'ib Khattab al-Shishani (Arabic: كتائب خطاب الشيشاني, lit. 'Khattab the Chechen’s Brigade') is a militant organization in Syria.

== History ==
=== Foundation ===
The group was founded in June 2020 and made itself known through an attack using an improvised explosive device against Turkish and Russian convoys in Ariha, damaging several of them; the group declared: "This [attack] was just a warning, what is coming is worse."

=== Activities ===
In August 2020, Kata'ib Khattab al-Shishani released a video showing an attack on a Russian patrol on the M4 highway.

=== Existence ===
The group is possibly fake because of its logo It has errors such as its writing in Arabic and Ibn al-Khattab He is not Chechen as the name of the brigade says
