= Armanaz Subdistrict =

Armanaz Subdistrict ناحية أرمناز
- Nahiyah
- Location in Idlib Governorate

- Location in Syria
- Coordinates: 36°01′09″N 36°29′31″E
- Country: Syria
- Governorate: Idlib
- District: Harem District
- Administrative centre: Armanaz

Population (2004)
  - Total: 27,267
  - Estimate (May 2022): 80,295
- Time zone: UTC+2 (EET)
  - Summer (DST): UTC+3 (EEST)
- Nahya pcod: SY070305

Armanaz Subdistrict (Arabic: ناحية أرمناز) is a Syrian nahiyah (subdistrict) located in Harem District of the Idlib Governorate in north-western Syria near the border with Turkey. The administrative centre of the subdistrict is the town of Armanaz. According to the Syria Central Bureau of Statistics (CBS), Armanaz Subdistrict had a population of 27267 in the 2004 census.

== Demographics ==
The population of the subdistrict is likely predominantly Sunni Muslim, reflecting the demographic composition of Idlib Governorate, where Arabs constitute the main ethnic group and the majority of the population is Sunni. The population is distributed across several small agricultural villages surrounding the town of Armanaz, the largest settlement in the subdistrict.. Over the past few years the population in the region has increased due to the influx of internally displaced people during the Syrian civil war. A United Nations OCHA displacement report recorded approximately 600 internally displaced person movements into Armanaz Subdistrict in May 2023..

== Economy ==
The economy of Armanaz Subdistrict is primarily based on rural industries and agriculture. Common crops grown in the area include wheat, vegetables and olives. Livestock farming is also an important source of livelihood. The town of Armanaz has historically been known for pottery and glassmaking, which have traditionally been significant sources of employment in the town. During the Syrian civil war, economic activity in the region was disrupted, including a temporary ban on pottery production by local authorities.

== Settlements ==
- Armanaz
- Bsaliya
- Biret Armanaz
- Dweila
- Ghafar
- Hafasraja
- Kabta, Idlib
- Kuwaro
- Millis, Syria
- Quneitra, Idlib
- Sheikh Yousef
- Haj Jomaa

== History ==
=== Pre-21st century ===
The area of present day Armanaz Subdistrict has historically formed part of the Harim region in northern Syria, which was incorporated into the Aleppo Vilayet of the Ottoman Empire.

Following the collapse of Ottoman rule after the First World War, the region became part of the French Mandate for Syria. The town of Armanaz was an administrative centre of the rebel movement against the French control over Syria during the Hananu Revolt (1919-1921). Following the French takeover of Aleppo in July 1920, Hananu restructured revolts in the country and formed a civilian government in Armanaz. Rebel governments collaborated with the local municipal authorities who collected taxes on landowners, farmers and livestock owners to finance guerrilla activities. Based in Armanaz, the administration liaised activities in some of the north-western regions of Syria, such as the districts of Harim, Jisr al-Shughur and Idlib.

=== Syrian Civil War ===
During the Syrian civil war, opposition forces captured much of northern Idlib Governorate in mid-2012, including areas around the town of Armanaz.

On 29 September 2017, airstrikes struck a residential neighbourhood in the town of Armanaz in what became known as the Armanaz massacre, killing at least 35 civilians, including children, and destroying approximately 30 houses. Witnesses reported that aircraft returned later the same night and bombed the same location while rescue workers were attempting to retrieve victims from the rubble.

In October 2017, clashes broke out in the town between Hay'at Tahrir al-Sham and rival rebel factions including Ahrar al-Sham and the Sham Legion. Following the fighting, HTS brought reinforcements to the area and imposed control over the town.

=== 2023 earthquake ===
On 6 February 2023, the Turkey–Syria earthquake struck southern Türkiye and northern Syria, causing major destruction across Idlib Governorate. Buildings collapsed in several towns in the Idlib countryside, including Armanaz. In the town, at least eleven multi-storey buildings and dozens of older houses collapsed, while many others were damaged or left at risk of collapse.
