= Biret Eljabal =

Biret Eljabal بيرة الجبل
- Village
- Location in Syria
- Coordinates: 35.237295°N 36.296757°E
- Country: Syria
- Governorate: Hama
- District: Al-Suqaylabiyah District
- Subdistrict: Tell Salhab

Population (2004)
  - Total: 543
- Time zone: UTC+3 (AST)
- City Qrya Pcode: C3135

Biret Eljabal (Arabic: بيرة الجبل) is a Syrian village located in Tell Salhab Subdistrict in Al-Suqaylabiyah District, Hama. According to the Syria Central Bureau of Statistics (CBS), Biret Eljabal had a population of 543 in the 2004 census.
