= Biret Armanaz =

Biret Armanaz بيرة ارمناز
- Village
- Location in Syria
- Coordinates: 36°02′02″N 36°29′14″E
- Country: Syria
- Governorate: Idlib
- District: Harem District
- Subdistrict: Armanaz Nahiyah
- Elevation: 262 m (860 ft)

Population (2004)
  - Total: 320
- Time zone: UTC+2 (EET)
  - Summer (DST): UTC+3 (EEST)
- City Qrya Pcode: C4180

Biret Armanaz (Arabic: بيرة ارمناز) is a village in Armanaz Subdistrict of Harem District in Idlib Governorate, north-western Syria. The village lies in the northern countryside of Idlib. According to the Syria Central Bureau of Statistics (CBS), As of 2004 Biret Armanaz had a population of 320 According to the 2004 census. Agriculture forms a major part of the towns local economy, with crops including wheat, vegetables, and olives.
