= Turmanin =

Termanin ترمانين
- Town
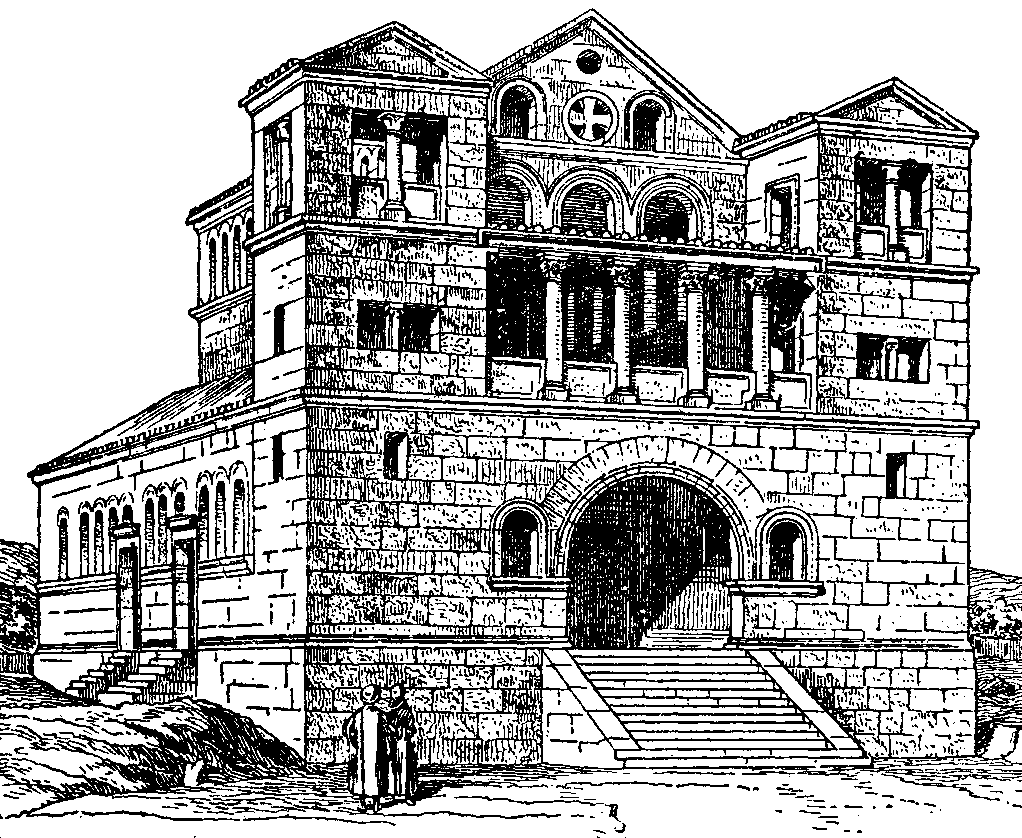
- Sketch of the Church of Turmānīn, c. 480 A.D.

- Location within Syria
- Coordinates: 36°14′N 36°49′E
- Country: Syria
- Governorate: Idlib
- District: Harem
- Subdistrict: al-Dana
- Elevation: 428 m (1,404 ft)

Population (2004 census)
  - Total: 10,394
- Time zone: UTC+2 (EET)
  - Summer (DST): UTC+3 (EEST)

Termanin (Arabic: ترمانين) is a town in northern Syria, administratively part of the Idlib Governorate, located north of Idlib. Nearby localities include al-Dana and Sarmada to the southwest, Darat Izza to the northeast and Atarib to the south. According to the Syria Central Bureau of Statistics, Termanin had a population of 10,394 in the 2004 census.

The town is notable for the ruins of an ancient basilica in its vicinity. The Basilica, built around 480 AD, was an important influence on later church architecture, and operated as a monastery and a hospice that was noted for its care for the dying. Recently, the town came under the control of the Syrian National Army.

== Climate ==
In Termanin, the climate is warm and temperate. In winter there is much more rainfall in Termanin than in summer. According to Köppen and Geiger climate is classified as Csa. The average annual temperature in Termanin is 16.9 °C. The average annual rainfall is 459 mm. The driest month is July with 0 mm. Most precipitation falls in January, with an average of 90 mm. The warmest month of the year is August with an average temperature of 27.7 °C. In January, the average temperature is 6.0 °C. It is the lowest average temperature of the whole year.

Climate data for Termanin
Month	Jan	Feb	Mar	Apr	May	Jun	Jul	Aug	Sep	Oct	Nov	Dec	Year
Mean daily maximum °C (°F)	9.0 (48.2)	11.2 (52.2)	15.2 (59.4)	20.5 (68.9)	26.3 (79.3)	31.0 (87.8)	33.2 (91.8)	32.7 (90.9)	31.4 (88.5)	25.3 (77.5)	17.2 (63.0)	10.8 (51.4)	22.0 (71.6)
Mean daily minimum °C (°F)	2.1 (35.8)	2.6 (36.7)	5.1 (41.2)	8.8 (47.8)	12.8 (55.0)	17.4 (63.3)	20.2 (68.4)	20.7 (69.3)	17.6 (63.7)	12.2 (54.0)	6.7 (44.1)	3.3 (37.9)	10.8 (51.4)
Average precipitation mm (inches)	90 (3.5)	79 (3.1)	61 (2.4)	43 (1.7)	20 (0.8)	4 (0.2)	0 (0)	0 (0)	4 (0.2)	28 (1.1)	46 (1.8)	84 (3.3)	459 (18.1)
Average snowy days	2	1	0	0	0	0	0	0	0	0	0	1	4
Source: Weather Online, Weather Base, BBC Weather and My Weather 2, Climate data

== Deir Turmanin: the Byzantine monastery ==
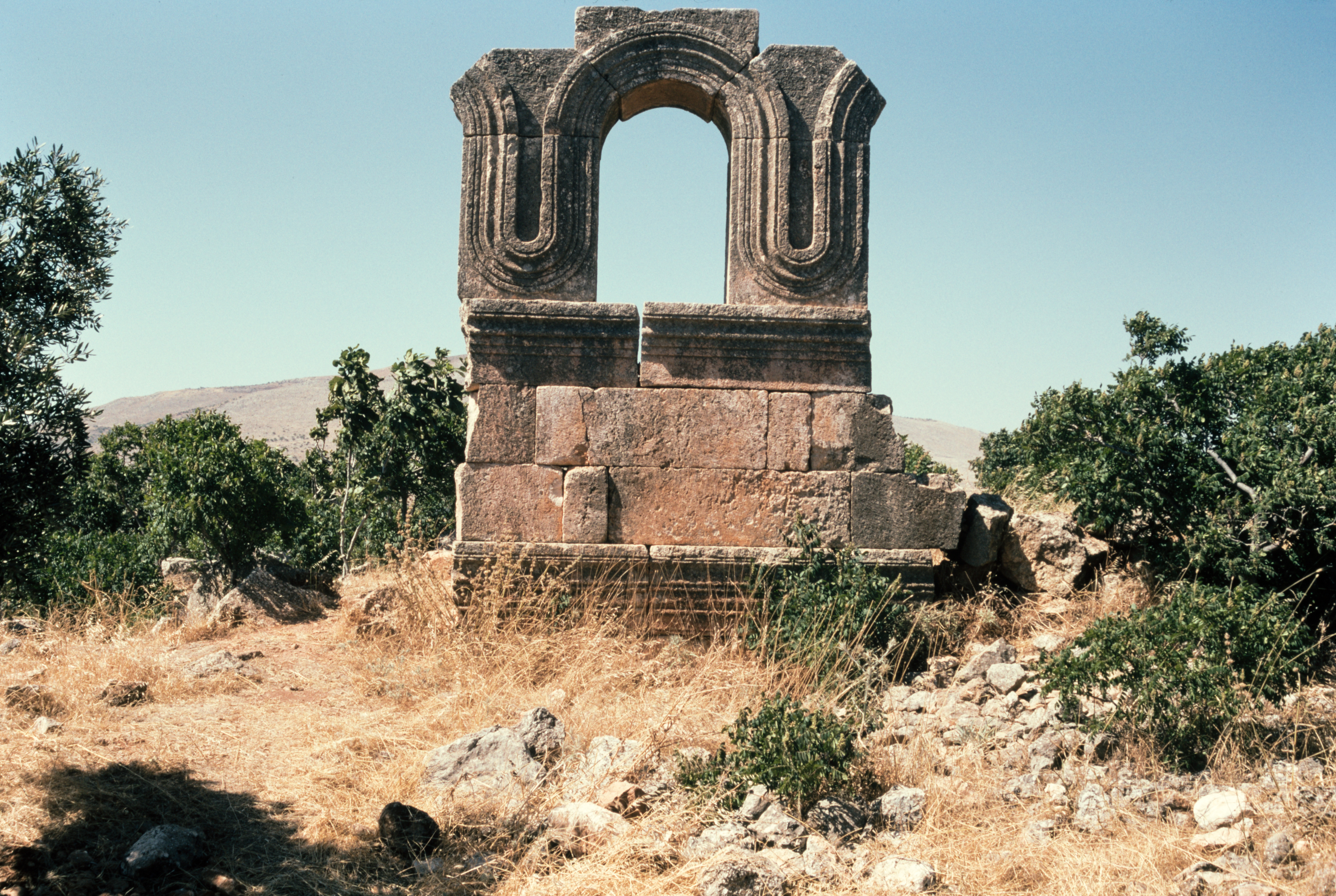
Remains of the church at Deir Turmanin. Photo by Frank Kidner

The ruins of the Byzantine monastery of Deir Turmanin (deir meaning 'monastery' in Arabic) are located northeast of the modern village. The monastery buildings stood around a paved courtyard containing two cisterns, a sarcophagus and several tombs. The ruins include a building that housed the monks' dormitories, and the large 5th-century basilica. The twin-towered facade of the church had a colonnade above the portal. The towers were three stories high and were roofed with gables. The church was probably donated by wealthy patrons. Evidence at the site suggests that the monks were involved in agricultural activity and kept livestock.

== See also ==
- Church of Saint Simeon Stylites
- Dead Cities

== Bibliography ==
- Baedeker, Karl (1876). Palestine and Syria, Handbook for Travellers. Karl Baedeker. "Burej Syria."
- Bowden, William; Lavan, Luke; Machado, Carlos (2004). Recent Research on the Late Antique Countryside. BRILL. ISBN 9789004136076.
