= Al-Dana, Syria =

al-Dana ٱلدَّانَا
- Town
- Location within Syria
- Coordinates: 36°12′52″N 36°46′11″E
- Country: (Syrian opposition) Syria
- Governorate: Idlib
- District: Harem
- Subdistrict: Al-Dana
- Control: (Syria) Syrian transitional government
- Elevation: 428 m (1,404 ft)

Population (2004 census)
  - Town: 14,208
  - Metro: 60,058
- Time zone: UTC+2 (EET)
  - Summer (DST): UTC+3 (EEST)

Al-Dana (Arabic: ٱلدَّانَا, romanized: ad-Dānā) is a town in northern Syria, administratively part of the Idlib Governorate, located north of Idlib, 38 kilometers west of Aleppo, and just east of the border with Turkey. Nearby localities include Sarmada to the southwest, Tell Elkarame to the south, Atarib to the southeast, Turmanin to the northeast, Salwah to the north and Qah to the northwest. According to the Syria Central Bureau of Statistics, al-Dana had a population of 14,208 in the 2004 census. The town is also the administrative center of the al-Dana nahiyah consisting of thirteen villages with a combined population of 60,058. Al-Dana was notable for its indigo dye industry which has since disappeared.

== History ==
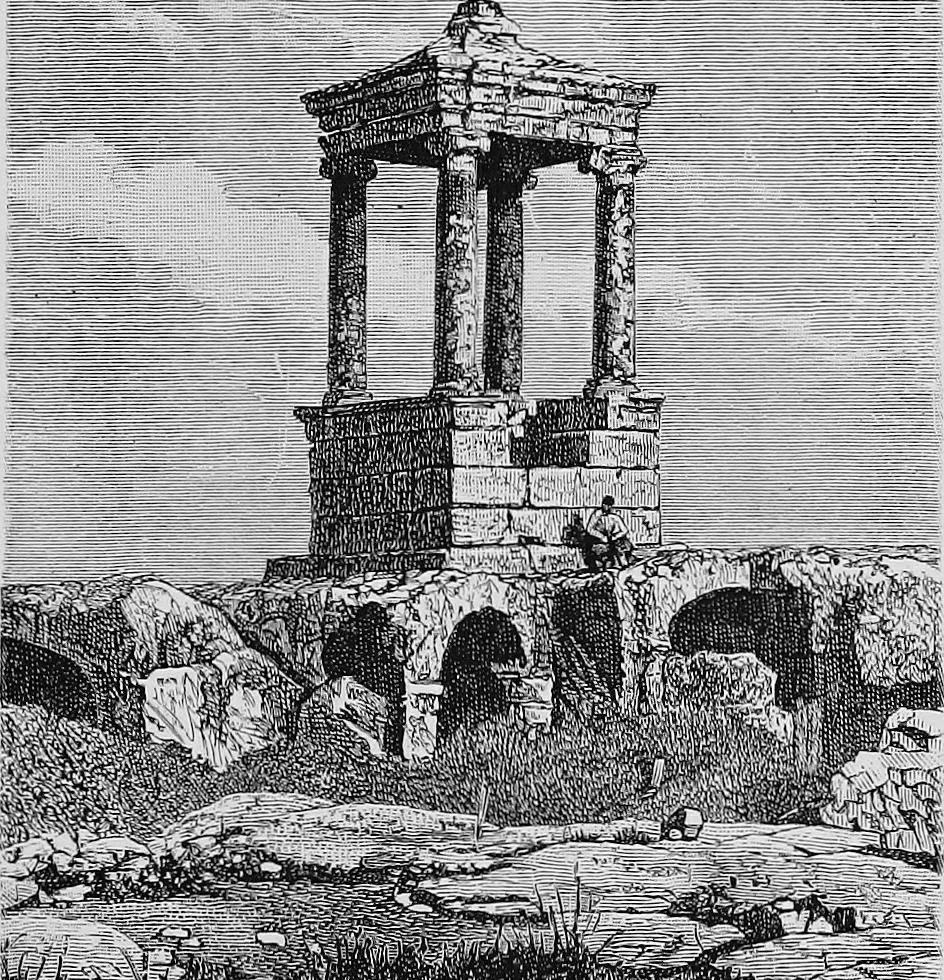
The Roman pyramid tomb.

Al-Dana has been identified with the Aramaean city of "Adennu" or "Adinnu." Adennu was the first Aramaean city conquered by the Assyrians during Shalmaneser III's military campaign against Syria in 853 BCE. The city was captured without resistance.

As part of the so-called Dead Cities, al-Dana, and its vicinity contain numerous ancient ruins which date back to the 3rd and 4th-century CE. A well-preserved Roman pyramid tomb, made of yellow stone and bearing elaborate carvings, is located to the north of the modern town center. A Roman gateway and the porticoes of several other Roman-era edifices also survive.

In the late 11th-century CE, al-Dana and nearby Sarmada were sacked by the Crusaders. The 13th-century Syrian geographer Yaqut al-Hamawi visited al-Dana in the 1220s, noting that it was located on the slopes of Mount Lebanon near Aleppo in the al-'Awasim area. He described the village as a "very ancient place" near which was a "large platform, as wide as a horse-racing course, cut in the hillside, square and leveled. At its center is a dome, within which is a tomb, as one of the ancient Adites, but of whom it is not known."

In the mid-19th-century al-Dana was visited by English traveler James Silk Buckingham who noted that the village was built along the slopes of a rock in the center of a plain. Most of its houses were built from the ruins of older structures, suggesting to Buckingham that al-Dana had previously been a considerable settlement. Around 500 Muslims lived in the village and worshiped in a small mosque, with a minaret and six domes arranged in two separate rows corresponding with each interior aisle.

The town is currently under the control of the Turkey-backed Syrian National Army.

On 16 February 2022, 3 civilians were killed in the town after Syrian Arab Army bombarded the town with artillery.
