= Ram Hamdan =

Ram Hamdan رام حمدان
- Village
- Location in Syria
- Coordinates: 36°1′32″N 36°42′50″E
- Country: Syria
- Governorate: Idlib
- District: Idlib District
- Subdistrict: Maarrat Misrin

Population (2004)
  - Total: 1,774
- Time zone: UTC+2 (EET)
  - Summer (DST): UTC+3 (EEST)
- City Qrya Pcode: C3941

Ram Hamdan (Arabic: رام حمدان) is a Syrian village located in Maarrat Misrin Nahiyah in Idlib District, Idlib. According to the Syria Central Bureau of Statistics (CBS), Ram Hamdan had a population of 1774 in the 2004 census.
