= Kafr Takharim Subdistrict =

Kafr Takharim Subdistrict ناحية كفر تخاريم
- Nahiyah
- Location in Idlib Governorate

- Location in Syria
- Country: Syria
- Governorate: Idlib
- District: Harem District

Population (2004)
  - Total: 14,772
- Time zone: UTC+2 (EET)
  - Summer (DST): UTC+3 (EEST)
- Nahya pcod: SY070303

Kafr Takharim Subdistrict (Arabic: ناحية كفر تخاريم) is a Syrian nahiyah (subdistrict) located in Harem District in Idlib. According to the Syria Central Bureau of Statistics (CBS), Kafr Takharim Subdistrict had a population of 14772 in the 2004 census.
