= Darat Izza =

Darat Izza دارة عزة
- Town
- Location within Syria
- Coordinates: 36°16′58″N 36°51′7″E
- Country: Syria
- Governorate: Aleppo
- District: Mount Simeon
- Subdistrict: Darat Izza
- Control: (Syria) Syrian transitional government
- Elevation: 477 m (1,565 ft)

Population (2004 census)
  - Town: 13,525
  - Metro: 41,953
- Time zone: UTC+3 (AST)

Darat Izza (Arabic: دارة عزة, also spelled Darat Aza or Darit Izza) is a town in northern Syria, administratively part of the Aleppo Governorate, located 30 kilometres (19 miles) northwest of Aleppo. Nearby localities include Deir Samaan to the north, Anadan to the east and Turmanin to the southwest.

Darat Izza is the administrative center of Darat Izza Nahiyah of the Jabal Sem‘ān District.

== Population ==
According to the Syria Central Bureau of Statistics (CBS), Darat Izza had a population of 13,525 in the 2004 census. In 2013, its metropolitan area had a population of 41,953.

== History ==
Leading to Darat Izza is a well-preserved stretch of an ancient Roman road dating to the 2nd century CE. During the Ottoman Empire era, Darat Izza was well known for the cotton fabrics it produced.

During the Syrian Civil war against the government of Bashar al-Assad, On June 23, 2012, 25 government supporters were killed in the town by members of the Free Syrian Army (FSA). The government claimed they were "citizens" while the FSA claimed they were pro-government Shabiha militiamen. The pro-opposition war monitory Syrian Observatory for Human Rights (SOHR) claimed the victims were shot to death and said they were "supporters of the regime – believed to be militiamen". They were part of a larger group kidnapped by a rebel group. The fate of the others kidnapped was unknown though it was suspected they were handed over to Jabhat al-Nusra. At least two of the corpses of the victims killed were shown to be in military uniform.

A secondary school has turned into a police station, a courthouse and a temporary town hall run by the rebels. It is part of a nascent rebel administration that is taking shape in areas of the country where Assad's authority has disappeared as his security forces try to secure control of Syria's main cities: Aleppo, Damascus, Homs and others. A defector from the Assad administration, Abdul Hadi heads a "revolutionary" security force made up of some 40 officers, all of them former policemen in the government. At times, Abdul Hadi's role seems more akin to that of a local mayor than a police officer. Among his self-assigned responsibilities, he monitors local bread supplies, urging bakeries to adjust production according to need. Recent rebel attacks on a government-owned wheat silo and army gasoline depots have given them access to new supplies. On 21 November, rebels attacked the nearby Sheikh Suleiman base (which was under siege for over two months), but were repelled from the area by an army counterattack, in which 25 rebels were killed. on 10 December, the base was taken by opposition forces. A little over 100 regime troops that were left inside the base retreated to the scientific building wearing gas masks.

The town was under the control of the Islamic State of Iraq and the Levant since September 2013, but they withdrew following a wide-scale offensive led by the Mujahideen Army and the Islamic Front.

Sabah and A Haber have stated in 2017 that the Turkish Armed Forces may be establishing a base by the Sheikh Barakat Mountain to facilitate an advance into Idlib Governorate. In 2018, the town came under the control of the Syrian Salvation Government led by Tahrir al-Sham (HTS).

On 17 February 2022, a fighter of the HTS was shot dead by a Syrian army sniper during a skirmish near the town.

== Bibliography ==
- Beattie, Andrew (2001). The Rough Guide to Syria. Vol. 2. Rough Guides. ISBN 1858287189.
- Faroqhi, Suraiya (1997). An Economic and Social History of the Ottoman Empire. Vol. 2. Cambridge University Press. ISBN 0521574552.
