= Harem Subdistrict =

Harem Subdistrict ناحية مركز حارم
- Nahiyah
- Location in Idlib Governorate

- Location in Syria
- Country: Syria
- Governorate: Idlib
- District: Harem District

Population (2004)
  - Total: 12,894
- Time zone: UTC+2 (EET)
  - Summer (DST): UTC+3 (EEST)
- Nahya pcod: SY070300

Harem Subdistrict (Arabic: ناحية مركز حارم) is a Syrian nahiyah (subdistrict) located in Harem District in Idlib. According to the Syria Central Bureau of Statistics (CBS), Harem Subdistrict had a population of 12894 in the 2004 census.
