= Al-Dana Subdistrict =

Al-Dana Subdistrict ناحية الدانا
- Nahiyah
- Location in Idlib Governorate

- Location in Syria
- Coordinates: 36.24°N 36.7289°E
- Country: Syria
- Governorate: Idlib
- District: Harem District

Population (2004)
  - Total: 60,058
- Time zone: UTC+2 (EET)
  - Summer (DST): UTC+3 (EEST)
- Nahya pcod: SY070301

Al-Dana Subdistrict (Arabic: ناحية الدانا) is a Syrian nahiyah (subdistrict) located in Harem District in Idlib. According to the Syria Central Bureau of Statistics (CBS), Al-Dana Subdistrict had a population of 60058 in the 2004 census.
