= Qurqania Subdistrict =

Qurqania Subdistrict ناحية قورقنيا
- Nahiyah
- Location in Idlib Governorate

- Location in Syria
- Coordinates: 36.1606°N 36.6072°E
- Country: Syria
- Governorate: Idlib
- District: Harem District

Population (2004)
  - Total: 12,552
- Time zone: UTC+2 (EET)
  - Summer (DST): UTC+3 (EEST)
- Nahya pcod: SY070304

Qurqania Subdistrict (Arabic: ناحية قورقنيا) is a Syrian nahiyah (subdistrict) located in Harem District in Idlib. According to the Syria Central Bureau of Statistics (CBS), Qurqania Subdistrict had a population of 12552 in the 2004 census.
