= Salqin Subdistrict =

Salqin Subdistrict ناحية سلقين
- Nahiyah
- Location in Idlib Governorate

- Location in Syria
- Country: Syria
- Governorate: Idlib
- District: Harem District

Population (2004)
  - Total: 47,939
- Time zone: UTC+2 (EET)
  - Summer (DST): UTC+3 (EEST)
- Nahya pcod: SY070302

Salqin Subdistrict (Arabic: ناحية سلقين) is a Syrian nahiyah (subdistrict) located in Harem District in Idlib. According to the Syria Central Bureau of Statistics (CBS), Salqin Subdistrict had a population of 47,939 in the 2004 census.
