= Harem District =

Harem District منطقة حارم
- District
- Map of Harem District within Idlib Governorate
- Coordinates (Harem): 36°12′28″N 36°31′09″E
- Country: Syria
- Governorate: Idlib
- Seat: Harem
- Subdistricts: 6 nawāḥī

Area
  - Total: 736.48 km^{2} (284.36 sq mi)

Population (2004)
  - Total: 175,482
  - Density: 238.27/km^{2} (617.12/sq mi)
- Geocode: SY0703

Harem District (Arabic: منطقة حارم, romanized: manṭiqat Ḥārim) is a district of the Idlib Governorate in northwestern Syria. The administrative centre is the city of Harem. At the 2004 census, it had a population of 175,482.

== Sub-districts ==
The district of Harem is divided into six sub-districts or nawāḥī (population as of 2004):

- Harem Subdistrict (ناحية حارم): population 12,894.
- Al-Dana Subdistrict (ناحية الدانا): population 60,058.
- Salqin Subdistrict (ناحية سلقين): population 47,939.
- Kafr Takharim Subdistrict (ناحية كفر تخاريم): population 14,772.
- Qurqania Subdistrict (ناحية قورقينا): population 12,552.
- Armanaz Subdistrict (ناحية أرمناز): population 27,267.
