= Kaftin =

Kaftin كفتين
- Village
- Location within Syria
- Coordinates: 36°5′46″N 36°40′47″E
- Country: Syria
- Governorate: Idlib
- District: Idlib
- Subdistrict: Ma'arrat Misrin
- Elevation: 340 m (1,120 ft)

Population (2004)
  - Total: 2,346
- Time zone: UTC+2 (EET)
  - Summer (DST): UTC+3 (EEST)

Kaftin (Arabic: كفتين, also spelled Keftin or Kaftayn) is a village in northern Syria, administratively part of the Idlib Governorate, located northwest of Idlib. The village is situated at the southern approach of the A'la Mountain. Nearby localities include Killi to the north, Hizano to the east, Kafr Yahmul to the southeast, Maarrat al-Ikhwan to the south, Harbanoush to the southwest and Qurqania to the northwest. According to the Syria Central Bureau of Statistics, Kaftin had a population of 2,346 in the 2004 census. Its inhabitants are predominantly members of the Druze community, one of the few Druze villages situated in northern Syria. Kaftin's inhabitants work primarily in agriculture and cultivate olives and cumin.

== History ==
=== Ottoman era ===
During the late Ottoman era, in the late 1840s, Kaftin was a Druze village headed by a sheikh ("local chief") named Abu Sharif Nasif. At the time most of the once-large Druze community of A'la Mountain had fled the area after being embroiled in a feud between the two Muslim villages of Kafr Takharim and Armanaz in the early 19th-century. The weaker Muslim party had taken up safe haven with the Druzes of the area and the Druze consequently launched an attack on the stronger Muslim village. Soon after, however, the two Muslim factions declared a truce and together with Muslim fighters from Antioch they assaulted the Druze of A'la Mountain. The Druze were decisively defeated and their sheikh was killed resulting in a mass flight towards Mount Lebanon, the Hauran and Damascus. A small number of Druze had returned to Kaftin and A'la Mountain by the mid-19th-century.

Kaftin was noted for its numerous pigeon houses where thousands of white pigeons would breed annually. In the 1790s English traveler William George Browne described the houses as "remarkable." When the young pigeons were able to fly, they would be collected and supplied to the markets of the nearby villages and Aleppo where they would be sold as valuable commodities. The pigeon houses were tall and narrow buildings, some of them reaching a height of 50 feet, and they numbered 72, although at the time the majority of them were in ruins.

In November 1875 a petition by the residents of Kaftin was sent to the British consul in Aleppo requesting intervention with the provincial Ottoman authorities of Aleppo who they accused of seizing and selling off their properties which they paid taxes for and planted olive trees on during the preceding generations.

=== Syrian civil war ===
During the ongoing Syrian civil war, Kaftin's residents provided shelter for internal refugees. although the Idlib region (with the exception of Idlib and small pockets of territory) is largely under opposition control, the Free Syrian Army (FSA) had not entered Kaftin or other Druze villages because the villages maintained their neutrality in the conflict and host many displaced families from neighboring towns. However, towards the end of 2013, militants from the Islamic State of Iraq and Syria (ISIS), a Salafist-jihadist organization, largely became dominant over the FSA and captured Kaftin along with other Druze-majority villages in area. They reportedly demanded that residents "announce their Islam" by converting their prayer houses into mosques and trimming their mustaches.

== See also ==
- Kafr Kila
- Qalb Loze
- Maarrat al-Ikhwan

== Bibliography ==
- Browne, William George (1806). Travels in Africa, Egypt, and Syria, from the Year 1792 to 1798. Vol. 1. T. Cadell and W. Davies.
- Edwards, B. B. (1848). Bibliotheca Sacra. Vol. 5. Dallas Theological Seminary.
- Firro, Kais (1992). A History of the Druzes. Vol. 1. BRILL. ISBN 9004094377.
- Kamal, Salibi (2005). The Druze: Realities & Perceptions. Druze Heritage Foundation. ISBN 1904850065.
