= Maarrat al-Ikhwan =

Marthwan مرتحوان Maaret al-Ikhwan
- Village
- Location in Syria
- Coordinates: 36°3′51″N 36°40′18″E
- Country: Syria
- Governorate: Idlib
- District: Idlib
- Subdistrict: Maarrat Misrin
- Elevation: 315 m (1,033 ft)

Population (2004)
  - Total: 1,831

Ma'arrat al-Ikhwan (Arabic: معرّة الإخوان, also spelled Ma'arrat al-Akwan, Maaret Ikhwan, Maaret Elekhwan or Martahwan) is a village in northwestern Syria, administratively part of Idlib Governorate located north of Idlib. Nearby localities include Maarrat Misrin to the south, Zardana to the southeast, Kafr Yahmul to the east, Hizano to the northeast, Kaftin to the north, Qurqania to the northwest and Harbanoush to the west. According to the Syria Central Bureau of Statistics (CBS), Ma'arrat al-Ikhwan had a population of 1,831 in the 2004 census. It has a significant population of Druze, who inhabit several small villages in the A'la Mountain and its vicinity.

== History ==
During the Muslim conquest of Syria in the 630s, Abu Ubaidah ibn al-Jarrah and his army destroyed Maarrat al-Ikhwan and Sarmin after capturing Maarrat Misrin and Aleppo. Ma'arat al-Ikhwan was one of the major towns, along with Maarrat Misrin and Zardana, of the al-Jazr district of Aleppo during the medieval period.

Ma'arrat al-Ikhwan is the birthplace of Shaykh Jabir al-Halabi, a renowned religious leader and a leading scholar of the Qur'an during the 17th century. He was honored with the title Shaykh al-Islam for the District of Aleppo by Ottoman sultan Murad IV. Following his death in 1640, Sultan Murad ordered the construction of a shrine over his tomb in Ma'arrat al-Ikhwan where it is still visited by both Muslims and Druze to receive blessings.

In the mid-19th century, Dutch merchant and author Thomas Hope visited Maarrat al-Ikhwan and noted that it was inhabited by members of the Alawite community. In the late 19th century Ma'arrat al-Ikhwan was described as a large village situated on an open plain and distinguished by roofs that resembled "sugar-cones." In another 19th-century account Western traveler Albert Socin described the place as an impoverished village.

During the ongoing Syrian civil war that began in 2011, opposition rebels from the Free Syrian Army set up a headquarters and military training camp in Ma'arrat al-Ikhwan.

== See also ==
- Druze in Syria
- Kafr Kila, Syria
- Kaftin
- Qalb Lozeh

== Bibliography ==
- Baedeker, K. (1876). Palestine and Syria, Handbook for Travellers. Vol. 1. Karl Baedeker.
- Dussaud, R. (1927). Bibliothèque archéologique et historique. Vol. 4. P. Geuthner.
- Gibb, H. A. R (1960). The Encyclopaedia of Islam. Vol. 1. Brill Archive.
- Salibi, K. (2005). The Druze: Realities & Perceptions. Druze Heritage Foundation. ISBN 1904850065.
- Socin, A. (1876). Palestine and Syria : handbook for travellers. Baedeker.
- Swayd, Sami S. (2006). Historical Dictionary of the Druzes. Scarecrow Press. ISBN 0810853329.
