= Killi (Syria) =

Killi كللي
- Village
- Location within Syria
- Coordinates: 36°6′37″N 36°41′38″E
- Country: Syria
- Governorate: Idlib
- District: Idlib
- Subdistrict: Ma'arrat Misrin

Population (2004)
  - Total: 7,157
- Time zone: UTC+2 (EET)
  - Summer (DST): UTC+3 (EEST)

Killi (Arabic: كللي) - or Kili - is a village in northern Syria, administratively part of the Idlib Governorate, located northwest of Idlib. It is situated just west of the A'la Mountains. Nearby localities include Kaftin to the southeast, Maarrat al-Ikhwan and Kafr Yahmul to the south, Hizano to the southwest, Atarib to the northwest, Sarmada to the north, Barisha to the northeast and Qurqania to the east. According to the Syria Central Bureau of Statistics, Killi had a population of 7,157 in the 2004 census.
