= Maarrat Misrin =

Ma'arrat Misrin مَعَرَّةُ مِصْرِينَ Ma'arrat Masrin
- Town
- Location in Syria
- Coordinates: 36°00′N 36°40′E
- Country: Syria
- Governorate: Idlib
- District: Idlib
- Subdistrict: Maarrat Misrin

Government
  - Head of City Council: Abed al-Aziz Rahal
- Elevation: 338 m (1,109 ft)

Population (2004)
  - Total: 17,519

Ma'arrat Misrin (Arabic: مَعَرَّةُ مِصْرِينَ, romanized: Maʿarrat Miṣrīn, also spelled Ma'arrat Masrin or Ma'aret Masreen) is a small city in northwestern Syria, administratively part of Idlib Governorate. Ma'arrat Misrin lies an elevation of 338 metres (1,109 ft). It is located 50 kilometers southwest of Aleppo and 40 kilometers north of Ma'arrat al-Numan and 12 kilometers from Sarmin. Nearby localities include Kafr Yahmul to the north, Zardana and Maarrat al-Ikhwan to the northeast, Taftanaz to the east, Ta'um, Binnish, al-Fu'ah and Kafriya to the southeast, Idlib to the south, and Hafasraja to the southwest.

According to the Syria Central Bureau of Statistics (CBS) Ma'arrat Misrin had a population of 17,519 in the 2004 census. It is the administrative center of a nahiya which consists of 16 localities with a total population of 57,859 in 2004. The Associated Press estimated the population of Ma'arrat Misrin was around 40,000 in 2012. The city's inhabitants are predominantly Sunni Muslim, although roughly 15% follow Shia Islam.

== Etymology ==
According to medieval Muslim geographers al-Muqaddasi and Abu'l-Fida, the town was originally called in Arabic "Maʾarrat Qinnasrīn" in reference to Jund Qinnasrin, the province to which it belonged. The name was often shortened to "Maʾarrat Nasrīn" and corrupted in later works as "Maʾarrat Masrīn". Syriac manuscripts dating back to the 8th century refer to the town as "Ma'arrat Mesren". The town was known to the Crusaders as "Megaret Basrin" or "Meguaret Mesrin".

== History ==
=== Early Islamic era ===
Ma'arat Misrin was captured by the Muslim army of Abu Ubaidah ibn al Jarrah in 637 CE after defeating a Byzantine force in the Battle of Hazir between the town and Aleppo. Like Aleppo, it surrendered under peaceful terms. Ma'arat Misrin is referred to as "Ma'arat Mesren" in 8th-century Syriac manuscripts. Amr ibn Hawbar served as its governor during the reign of Abbasid caliph al-Mutawakkil.

Byzantine general Nikephoros II Phokas conquered Ma'arat Misrin in 968 and expelled its 1,200 inhabitants to Anatolia. The following year he made a truce with the Fatimids whereby the latter would gain control over the town. The Bani Kilab under the leadership of Salih ibn Mirdas launched an expedition to conquer Aleppo in 1024. During the offensive Mirdasid commander Abu Mansur Sulayman ibn Tawk captured Ma'arrat Misrin and imprisoned its governor. Later, before 1063, the Byzantines recaptured the town after Salih’s son Atiyya defected from his nephew Mahmud ibn Nasr's army, which was attacking Baalbek. Atiyya and the Byzantine army of Antioch subsequently raided Ma'arrat Misrin, burned its outskirts and killed several of its inhabitants. The Seljuks captured it towards the end of the 11th century, and the Seljuk prince of Antioch, Yaghi-Basan, died in Ma'arat Misrin in 1097.

=== Crusades ===
In 1099, Ma'arat Misrin was conquered by the Crusaders who killed the town's defenders and destroyed the minbar ("pulpit") of its mosque. However, after the capture of Baldwin I of Edessa, the Muslim inhabitants of Ma'arat Misrin and nearby al-Fu'ah and Sarmin revolted against their Crusader rulers in 1104, inflicting heavy casualties against their troops. Within a few years, Ma'arrat Misrin entered the hands of the Ismailis who launched an assault from there against Crusader-held Shaizar in April 1114. However, the Ismailis were routed by the Bani Munqidh, a local Arab tribe.

Ma'arat Misrin once again came under Crusader control after the town capitulated upon the approach of Baldwin II in 1119. The Burid and Artuqid rulers Toghtekin and Ilghazi besieged it the next year, prompting Baldwin II to lead a relief effort. Afterward, a peace treaty between the two factions was made, whereby Ma'arrat Misrin, Kafartab and al-Bara would remain with the Crusaders. It served as the Crusaders' camp during Alsunqur al-Bursuqi's raids in the area in early 1126 until they were forced to withdraw due to a supplies shortage. In 1129 Imad al-Din Zengi stormed Ma'arrat Misrin's suburbs, while the Zengid governor of Aleppo, Sawar, plundered the town in 1132 before retreating to Aleppo. Imad's successor Nur al-Din Zengi continued to raid the Crusader-held town during his reign.

In 1175, Ayyubid Sultan Saladin undertook a successful campaign against the Ismailis who controlled Maarrat Misrin and its surroundings. Saladin appointed his maternal uncle, Shihab al-Din al-Hariri, as governor of the area. During the summer of 1222, the Ayyubid emir of Aleppo, al-Salih, gained control over Ma'arrat Misrin, only to exchange it for Aintab in 1227. In 1240, the town was invaded and sacked by the Khwarezmiyya.

=== Ottoman era ===
In the 17th century during the Ottoman rule, Ma'arat Misrin was the center of a Qadaa in the Aleppo Vilayet. The town was a large village situated among sesame fields and olive groves in the late 19th century. In the early 20th century, American archaeologist Robert Garrett noted that the town's soil was "unusually fertile" and that there was an abundance of fig trees.

=== Modern era ===
In the early period of French Mandate rule, Ma'arrat Misrin was the center of a nahiya ("subdistrict") in the larger district of Aleppo. The town had a population of around 3,000 inhabitants in 1930. In 1945, Maarrat Misrin, which was under the jurisdiction of the district of Idlib, had 5,000 inhabitants.

Ma'arrat Misrin serves a large market town for the surrounding rural agricultural villages. The grocers market in the city covers several blocks.

==== Syrian Civil War ====
Ma'arrat Masrin has seen violence during the ongoing Syrian Civil War which began in 2011. Small demonstrations against government corruption and the security services began in April 2011. On 12 December 2011 opposition activists claimed the Syrian Army "indiscriminately" killed eleven people in the town and nearby Kafr Yahmul. The incident began when soldiers allegedly shot dead two civilians in Ma'arrat Misrin prompting residents to block the main road leading to the villages. The army then fired randomly, resulting in eleven deaths. The next day, defectors from the army attacked a convoy of security forces in the Idlib region, killing seven, according to activists. Hours later two more residents were shot by Syrian security forces during a funeral procession for those killed the previous day.

Tit-for-tat kidnappings have occurred throughout the uprising between residents of Ma'arrat Misrin and the nearby Shia Muslim towns of al-Fu'ah and Kafriya. In March 2012 the Syrian Army shelled the city, resulting in the deaths of five residents. The head of the city's eight-member rebel council negotiated an end to the fighting whereby opposition rebels would remove their checkpoints and the army would cease military operations against the town. Fighting between the two largely stopped, however, according to a Syrian military source cited by Syrian Documents, on 7 September 2012, the Syrian Army ambushed a rebel unit in Ma'arrat Misrin. More than 42 were killed. In December 2012, a kidnapped NBC News team was held hostage in a chicken farm near Ma'arrat Misrin controlled by FSA-aligned rebel group North Idlib Falcons Brigade.

== Bibliography ==
- Houtsma, M. Thomas (1987). E.J. Brill's First Encyclopaedia of Islam, 1913-1936. BRILL. ISBN 9004082654.
- Gibb, H. A. R (1960). The Encyclopaedia of Islam. Vol. 1. Brill Archive.
- Mukaddasi (1886). Description of Syria, including Palestine. London: Palestine Pilgrims' Text Society.
- le Strange, Guy (1890), Palestine Under the Moslems: A Description of Syria and the Holy Land from A.D. 650 to 1500, Committee of the Palestine Exploration Fund
