= Harbanoush =

Haranabush حربنوش
- Village
- Location within Syria
- Coordinates: 36°4′31″N 36°38′11″E
- Country: Syria
- Governorate: Idlib
- District: Idlib
- Subdistrict: Ma'arrat Misrin

Population (2004)
  - Total: 3,785
- Time zone: UTC+2 (EET)
  - Summer (DST): UTC+3 (EEST)

Harbanoush (Arabic: حربنوش) is a village in northern Syria, administratively part of Idlib Governorate, located northwest of Idlib. It is situated off the eastern slopes of A'la Mountain. Nearby localities include Maarrat Misrin to the southeast, Maarrat al-Ikhwan to the east, Kaftin and Hizano to the northeast, Qurqania to the north and Kafr Takharim and Armanaz to the west. According to the Syria Central Bureau of Statistics, Harbanoush had a population of 3,785 in the 2004 census.
