= Bweiti =

Bweiti بويطي
- Village
- Location in Syria
- Country: Syria
- Governorate: Idlib
- District: Idlib District
- Subdistrict: Saraqib Nahiyah

Population (2004)
  - Total: 784
- Time zone: UTC+2 (EET)
  - Summer (DST): UTC+3 (EEST)
- City Qrya Pcode: C3911

Bweiti (Arabic: بويطي) is a Syrian village located in Saraqib Nahiyah in Idlib District, Idlib. According to the Syria Central Bureau of Statistics (CBS), Bweiti had a population of 784 in the 2004 census.
