= Lof, Idlib =

Lof, Idlib لوف
- Village
- Location in Syria
- Coordinates: 35°46′11″N 36°49′50″E
- Country: Syria
- Governorate: Idlib
- District: Idlib District
- Subdistrict: Saraqib Nahiyah

Population (2004)
  - Total: 1,539
- Time zone: UTC+2 (EET)
  - Summer (DST): UTC+3 (EEST)
- City Qrya Pcode: C3929

Lof, Idlib (Arabic: لوف) is a Syrian village located in Saraqib Nahiyah in Idlib District, Idlib. According to the Syria Central Bureau of Statistics (CBS), Lof, Idlib had a population of 1539 in the 2004 census.
