= Baragethi =

Baragethi البراغيثي
- Village
- Location in Syria
- Coordinates: 35°45′41″N 37°2′25″E
- Country: Syria
- Governorate: Idlib
- District: Idlib District
- Subdistrict: Abu al-Duhur Nahiyah

Population (2004)
  - Total: 1,058
- Time zone: UTC+2 (EET)
  - Summer (DST): UTC+3 (EEST)
- City Qrya Pcode: C3893

Baragethi (Arabic: البراغيثي) is a Syrian village located in Abu al-Duhur Nahiyah in Idlib District, Idlib. According to the Syria Central Bureau of Statistics (CBS), Baragethi had a population of 1058 in the 2004 census.
