= Taftanaz =

Taftanaz تَفْتَنَاز Teftanaz
- Town
- Location in Syria
- Coordinates: 35°59′49″N 36°47′12″E
- Country: Syria
- Governorate: Idlib
- District: Idlib
- Subdistrict: Taftanaz
- Elevation: 330 m (1,080 ft)

Population (2004)
  - Total: 8,540
- Time zone: UTC+3 (EET)
  - Summer (DST): UTC+2 (EEST)

Taftanaz (Arabic: تَفْتَنَاز, romanized: Taftanāz, also spelled Teftanaz) is a town in northwestern Syria, administratively part of the Idlib Governorate, located 17 kilometers northeast of Idlib. Nearby localities include Ta'um and Binnish to the southwest, Maarrat Misrin to the west, Zardana to the northwest, Maarrat al-Ikhwan to the northeast and Bawabiyah to the east. Taftanaz is a primarily agricultural town and consists of concrete buildings. It is surrounded by wheat fields.

According to the Central Bureau of Statistics (CBS), Taftanaz had a population of 8,540 in the 2004 census. The town is also the administrative center of the Taftanaz nahiyah which consists of five villages with a combined population of 24,145. Its inhabitants are predominantly Sunni Muslims.

== History ==
The name "Taftanaz" is neither an Arabic nor Turkish word. Instead, it is likely that the name is of Hittite origins. Taftanaz was mentioned in an inscription on the Temple of Karnak as one of the places conquered by Thutmose III during the Eighteenth dynasty of Egypt in the 15th-century BCE.

=== Syrian civil war ===
Residents of Taftanaz participated in several successive demonstrations protesting the Syrian government starting from April 2011, the beginning of the uprising. Between the first April demonstration and April 2012, security forces raided the town four times. In October 2011, clashes between the Syrian Army and local rebels resulted in the deaths of five people in Taftanaz. On 21 March 2012 further heavy clashes occurred between the army and rebels, forcing rebels to retreat from Taftanaz.

On 3 April 2012, the Syrian Army shelled Taftanaz before launching a heavy three-day assault on the town. At least 62 people were reported killed and by June about two-thirds of the population fled the town. The Ghazal family lost 39 of its members in the assault. Another account put civilian fatalities at 56 and claimed 60% of the town's residents fled, mostly north to Turkey. Although residents claim that the presence of anti-government fighters was small, rebels from the general area were responsible for several attacks on army checkpoints resulting in the destruction of around nine tanks and the deaths of a number of soldiers. Residents also claim the army assault was meant to stymie protests in the surrounding villages by making an example of Taftanaz which largely joined the uprising early on.

Although protests would continue to be held by young residents in Taftanaz, they became much smaller after the 3 April assault. State media reported that a rebel assault on the Taftanaz Military Airbase was repelled and several rebels were killed on 29 August. However, opposition activists claimed the airbase was attacked and declared inoperable by rebels on 5 September.

On 3 November 2012 five rebel units have launched a coordinated attack on the Taftanaz airbase supported by mortars and rocket fire. After two months of assault, in which the Al-Nusra Front is said to have played a key role, on 11 January 2013, the airbase fell into rebel hands. The rebels seized vehicles and ammunition, but government forces managed to save most of the helicopters present at the airbase.

== Bibliography ==
- Palestine Exploration Fund (1881). Quarterly Statement. Published at the Fund's Office.
- Birch, Samuel (1891). Records of the Past. Vol. 5. Forgotten Books. ISBN 1440060673.
