= Ora Shamaliyah =

Ora Shamaliyah عرى الشمالية
- Village
- Location in Syria
- Coordinates: 35°53′09″N 36°30′14″E
- Country: Syria
- Governorate: Idlib
- District: Idlib District
- Subdistrict: Idlib Nahiyah

Population (2004)
  - Total: 1,157
- Time zone: UTC+2 (EET)
  - Summer (DST): UTC+3 (EEST)
- City Qrya Pcode: C3874

Ora Shamaliyah (Arabic: عرى الشمالية) is a Syrian village located in Idlib Nahiyah in Idlib District, Idlib. According to the Syria Central Bureau of Statistics (CBS), Ora Shamaliyah had a population of 1157 in the 2004 census.
