= Shallakh =

Coordinates: 36.0186°N 36.7939°E

Shallakh شللخ
- Village
- Location in Syria
- Country: Syria
- Governorate: Idlib
- District: Idlib District
- Subdistrict: Taftanaz Nahiyah

Population (2004)
  - Total: 1,917
- Time zone: UTC+2 (EET)
  - Summer (DST): UTC+3 (EEST)
- City Qrya Pcode: C3934

Shallakh (Arabic: شللخ) is a Syrian village located in Taftanaz Nahiyah in Idlib District, Idlib. According to the Syria Central Bureau of Statistics (CBS), Shallakh had a population of 1917 in the 2004 census.
