= Hizano =

Hizano حزانو
- Village
- Location within Syria
- Coordinates: 36°5′24″N 36°42′53″E
- Country: Syria
- Governorate: Idlib
- District: Idlib
- Subdistrict: Ma'arrat Misrin

Population (2004)
  - Total: 2,593
- Time zone: UTC+2 (EET)
  - Summer (DST): UTC+3 (EEST)

Hizano (Arabic: حزانو, also spelled Hazzanu) is a village in northern Syria, administratively part of the Idlib Governorate, located northwest of Idlib. Nearby localities include Kafr Yahmul and Maarrat al-Ikhwan to the south, Zardana to the southwest, Kafr Halab to the west, Atarib to the northwest, Sarmada to the north, Killi to the northeast, Kaftin to the east and Harbanoush to the southeast. According to the Syria Central Bureau of Statistics, Hizano had a population of 2,593 in the 2004 census.
