= Kafruhin =

Kafruhin كفروحين
- Village
- Location in Syria
- Country: Syria
- Governorate: Idlib
- District: Idlib District
- Subdistrict: Idlib Nahiyah

Population (2004)
  - Total: 1,737
- Time zone: UTC+2 (EET)
  - Summer (DST): UTC+3 (EEST)
- City Qrya Pcode: C3879

Kafruhin (Arabic: كفروحين) is a Syrian village located in Idlib Nahiyah in Idlib District, Idlib. According to the Syria Central Bureau of Statistics (CBS), Kafruhin had a population of 1737 in the 2004 census.
