= Tawil Elsheikh =

Tawil Elsheikh طويل الشيخ
- Village
- Location in Syria
- Country: Syria
- Governorate: Idlib
- District: Idlib District
- Subdistrict: Abu al-Duhur Nahiyah

Population (2004)
  - Total: 760
- Time zone: UTC+2 (EET)
  - Summer (DST): UTC+3 (EEST)
- City Qrya Pcode: C3896

Tawil Elsheikh (Arabic: طويل الشيخ) is a Syrian village located in Abu al-Duhur Nahiyah in Idlib District, Idlib. According to the Syria Central Bureau of Statistics (CBS), Tawil Elsheikh had a population of 760 in the 2004 census.
