= Hmeimat Eldayer =

Hmeimat Eldayer حميمات الداير
- Village
- Location in Syria
- Coordinates: 35°47′18″N 37°06′21″E
- Country: Syria
- Governorate: Idlib
- District: Idlib District
- Subdistrict: Abu al-Duhur Nahiyah

Population (2004)
  - Total: 1,692
- Time zone: UTC+2 (EET)
  - Summer (DST): UTC+3 (EEST)
- City Qrya Pcode: C3900

Hmeimat Eldayer (Arabic: حميمات الداير) is a Syrian village located in Abu al-Duhur Nahiyah in Idlib District, Idlib. According to the Syria Central Bureau of Statistics (CBS), Hmeimat Eldayer had a population of 1692 in the 2004 census.
