= Anqrati =

Anqrati انقراتي
- Village
- Location in Syria
- Coordinates: 35°47′16″N 36°49′17″E
- Country: Syria
- Governorate: Idlib
- District: Idlib District
- Subdistrict: Saraqib Nahiyah

Population (2004)
  - Total: 982
- Time zone: UTC+2 (EET)
  - Summer (DST): UTC+3 (EEST)
- City Qrya Pcode: C3907

Anqrati (Arabic: انقراتي) is a Syrian village located in Saraqib Nahiyah in Idlib District, Idlib. According to the Syria Central Bureau of Statistics (CBS), Anqrati had a population of 982 in the 2004 census.
