= Ketyan =

Coordinates: 36.0539°N 36.8100°E

Ketyan كتيان
- Village
- Location in Syria
- Country: Syria
- Governorate: Idlib
- District: Idlib District
- Subdistrict: Taftanaz Nahiyah

Population (2004)
  - Total: 1,876
- Time zone: UTC+2 (EET)
  - Summer (DST): UTC+3 (EEST)
- City Qrya Pcode: C3936

Ketyan (Arabic: كتيان) is a Syrian village located in Taftanaz Nahiyah in Idlib District, Idlib. According to the Syria Central Bureau of Statistics (CBS), Ketyan had a population of 1876 in the 2004 census.
