= Arshani =

Arshani عرشاني
- Village
- Location in Syria
- Coordinates: 35°57′09″N 36°33′25″E
- Country: Syria
- Governorate: Idlib
- District: Idlib District
- Subdistrict: Idlib Nahiyah

Population (2004)
  - Total: 935
- Time zone: UTC+2 (EET)
  - Summer (DST): UTC+3 (EEST)
- City Qrya Pcode: C3875

Arshani (Arabic: عرشاني) is a Syrian village located in Idlib Nahiyah in Idlib District, Idlib. According to the Syria Central Bureau of Statistics (CBS), Arshani had a population of 935 in the 2004 census.
