= Bijfas =

Bujghas بجغاص
- Village
- Location in Syria
- Country: Syria
- Governorate: Idlib
- District: Idlib District
- Subdistrict: Saraqib Nahiyah

Population (2004)
  - Total: 513
- Time zone: UTC+2 (EET)
  - Summer (DST): UTC+3 (EEST)
- City Qrya Pcode: C3912

Bujghas (Arabic: بجغاص) is a Syrian village located in Saraqib Nahiyah in Idlib District, Idlib. According to the Syria Central Bureau of Statistics (CBS), Bijfas had a population of 513 in the 2004 census.

The estimated terrain elevation above sea level is 344 meters. Variant forms of spelling for Bujghāş or in other languages: Borj Khass, Borj el Hâs, Bojrhâs, Bujghāş (ar), Bojrhas, Bojrhâs, Borj Khass, Borj el Has, Borj el Hâs, Bujghas, Bujghāş.
