= Kafr Amim, Idlib =

Kafr Amim, Idlib كفر عميم
- Village
- Location in Syria
- Coordinates: 35°48′55″N 36°52′13″E
- Country: Syria
- Governorate: Idlib
- District: Idlib District
- Subdistrict: Saraqib Nahiyah

Population (2004)
  - Total: 3,645
- Time zone: UTC+2 (EET)
  - Summer (DST): UTC+3 (EEST)
- City Qrya Pcode: C3928

Kafr Amim, Idlib (Arabic: كفر عميم) is a Syrian village located in Saraqib Nahiyah in Idlib District, Idlib. According to the Syria Central Bureau of Statistics (CBS), Kafr Amim, Idlib had a population of 3,645 in the 2004 census.
