= Tweim, Idlib =

Tweim, Idlib التويم
- Village
- Location in Syria
- Country: Syria
- Governorate: Idlib
- District: Idlib District
- Subdistrict: Abu al-Duhur Nahiyah

Population (2004)
  - Total: 183
- Time zone: UTC+2 (EET)
  - Summer (DST): UTC+3 (EEST)
- City Qrya Pcode: C3885

Tweim, Idlib (Arabic: التويم) is a Syrian village located in Abu al-Duhur Nahiyah in Idlib District, Idlib. According to the Syria Central Bureau of Statistics (CBS), Tweim, Idlib had a population of 183 in the 2004 census.
