= Jdidhe Abu Elthohur =

Jdidhe Abu Elthohur جديدة أبو الظهور
- Village
- Location in Syria
- Coordinates: 35°45′56″N 37°1′27″E
- Country: Syria
- Governorate: Idlib
- District: Idlib District
- Subdistrict: Abu al-Duhur Nahiyah

Population (2004)
  - Total: 1,317
- Time zone: UTC+2 (EET)
  - Summer (DST): UTC+3 (EEST)
- City Qrya Pcode: C3887

Jdidhe Abu Elthohur (Arabic: جديدة أبو الظهور) is a Syrian village located in Abu al-Duhur Nahiyah in Idlib District, Idlib. According to the Syria Central Bureau of Statistics (CBS), Jdidhe Abu Elthohur had a population of 1317 in the 2004 census.
