= Binnish =

Binnish بِنِّش
- City
- Location in Syria
- Coordinates: 35°57′N 36°42′E
- Country: Syria
- Governorate: Idlib
- District: Idlib
- Subdistrict: Binnish
- Control: Syrian transitional government
- Elevation: 360 m (1,180 ft)

Population (2011)
  - Total: 52,000

Binnish (Arabic: بِنِّش, romanized: Binniš, also spelled Binsh) is a city in northwestern Syria, administratively belonging to the Idlib Governorate, located just east of Idlib. Nearby localities include Kafriya and Maarrat Misrin to the northwest, al-Fu'ah to the north, Ta'um and Taftanaz to the northeast, Afs to the southeast and Sarmin to the south. According to the Syria Central Bureau of Statistics (CBS), Binnish had a population of 52,000 in the 2011 census. Its inhabitants are predominantly Sunni Muslim.

The city is situated on a hill. The city name Binnish is mentioned in the Tablets of Ebla 2400 BC. The city is famous for olive, vine and fig trees besides its varied crops of all kinds.

== Syrian Civil War ==
In response to the rebel assault on Idlib, government forces had reportedly launched a chlorine-bomb attack on Rebel-held Binnish, leaving dozens of people hospitalized.
