= Tab Issa Gharbi wa Sharki =

Tab Issa Gharbi wa Sharki تب عيسى شرقية وغربية
- Village
- Location in Syria
- Coordinates: 35°54′50″N 36°33′05″E
- Country: Syria
- Governorate: Idlib
- District: Idlib District
- Subdistrict: Idlib Nahiyah

Population (2004)
  - Total: 810
- Time zone: UTC+2 (EET)
  - Summer (DST): UTC+3 (EEST)
- City Qrya Pcode: C3870

Tab Issa Gharbi wa Sharki (Arabic: تب عيسى شرقية وغربية) is a Syrian village located in Idlib Nahiyah in Idlib District, Idlib. According to the Syria Central Bureau of Statistics (CBS), Tab Issa Gharbi wa Sharki had a population of 810 in the 2004 census.
