= Jallas, Idlib =

Jallas, Idlib جلاس
- Village
- Location in Syria
- Coordinates: 35°52′26″N 36°56′45″E
- Country: Syria
- Governorate: Idlib
- District: Idlib District
- Subdistrict: Abu al-Duhur Nahiyah

Population (2004)
  - Total: 404
- Time zone: UTC+2 (EET)
  - Summer (DST): UTC+3 (EEST)
- City Qrya Pcode: C3890

Jallas, Idlib (Arabic: جلاس) is a Syrian village located in Abu al-Duhur Nahiyah in Idlib District, Idlib. According to the Syria Central Bureau of Statistics (CBS), Jallas, Idlib had a population of 404 in the 2004 census.
