= Ta'um =

Ta'um طَعُوم
- Village
- Location within Syria
- Coordinates: 35°58′24″N 36°44′56″E
- Country: Syria
- Governorate: Idlib
- District: Idlib
- Subdistrict: Binnish

Population (2004)
  - Total: 3,054
- Time zone: UTC+2 (EET)
  - Summer (DST): UTC+3 (EEST)

Ta'um (Arabic: طَعُوم, romanized: Ṭaʿūm, also spelled Tu'um or Taoum) is a village in northern Syria, administratively part of the Idlib Governorate, located northeast of Idlib. Nearby localities include Binnish to the southwest, al-Fu'ah to the west, Zardana to the north, Taftanaz to the northeast, Talhiyeh to the east and Afes to the southeast. According to the Syria Central Bureau of Statistics, Ta'um had a population of 3,054 in the 2004 census.

== Syrian Civil War ==
On 19 December 2014, the Syrian Army shelled the village, killing 3 people and injuring numerous others.
