= Maharem, Idlib =

Maharem, Idlib محاريم
- Village
- Location in Syria
- Country: Syria
- Governorate: Idlib
- District: Idlib District
- Subdistrict: Saraqib Nahiyah

Population (2004)
  - Total: 922
- Time zone: UTC+2 (EET)
  - Summer (DST): UTC+3 (EEST)
- City Qrya Pcode: C3926

Maharem, Idlib (Arabic: محاريم) is a Syrian village located in Saraqib Nahiyah in Idlib District, Idlib. According to the Syria Central Bureau of Statistics (CBS), Maharem, Idlib had a population of 922 in the 2004 census.
