= Batenta =

Batenta باتنته
- Village
- Location in Syria
- Coordinates: 36°0′26″N 36°37′57″E
- Country: Syria
- Governorate: Idlib
- District: Idlib District
- Subdistrict: Ma'arrat Misrin

Population (2004)
  - Total: 1,165
- Time zone: UTC+2 (EET)
  - Summer (DST): UTC+3 (EEST)
- City Qrya Pcode: C3939

Batenta (Arabic: باتنته) is a Syrian village located in Maarrat Misrin Nahiyah in Idlib District, Idlib. According to the Syria Central Bureau of Statistics (CBS), Batenta had a population of 1165 in the 2004 census.
