= Kafr Jales =

Kafr Jales كفر جالس
- Village
- Location in Syria
- Country: Syria
- Governorate: Idlib
- District: Idlib District
- Subdistrict: Ma'arrat Misrin

Population (2004)
  - Total: 2,770
- Time zone: UTC+2 (EET)
  - Summer (DST): UTC+3 (EEST)
- City Qrya Pcode: C3945

Kafr Jales (Arabic: كفر جالس) is a Syrian village located in Maarrat Misrin Nahiyah in Idlib District, Idlib. According to the Syria Central Bureau of Statistics (CBS), Kafr Jales had a population of 2770 in the 2004 census.

== Syrian Civil War ==
On 17 November 2016, six civilians were killed in an airstrike on the settlement.
