= Zardana =

Zardana زردنا Zerdana
- Village
- Location in Syria
- Coordinates: 36°02′46″N 36°45′16″E
- Country: Syria
- Governorate: Idlib
- District: Idlib
- Subdistrict: Maarrat Misrin

Population (2004)
  - Total: 5,769
- Time zone: UTC+2 (EET)
  - Summer (DST): UTC+3 (EEST)

Zardana (Arabic: زردنا, also spelled Zerdana or Zirdana) is a village in northwestern Syria, administratively part of Idlib Governorate. The village lies in a relatively flat plain. Nearby localities include Taftanaz to the southeast, al-Fu'ah and Binnish to the south, Maarrat Misrin and Kafriya to the southwest, Kafr Yahmul to the west, Hizano to the northwest, Ibbin to the north, Kafr Nouran to the northeast and Maaret Elnaasan to the east. According to the Syria Central Bureau of Statistics (CBS) Zardana had a population of 5,767 in the 2004 census. Its inhabitants are predominantly Sunni Muslim.

In the 12th century, during the Crusades, Zardana was a significant fortress town which changed hands several times between the Crusaders and various Muslim powers. In modern times, the residents of the village are mostly employed in the civil service or in agriculture, with the main crops being wheat, barley and olives. The cultivation of the latter is a relatively recent development. Zardana's total land area roughly consists of 2,000 hectares. The health center provides medical care for the residents of Zardana and the surrounding villages. Zardana contains two primary schools and two secondary schools.

== History ==
=== Crusader era ===
In 1100, Zardana was briefly under the control of the Principality of Antioch, a Crusader state based in Antioch near the Mediterranean coast. In June of that year, Bohemond I of Antioch defeated the Muslim leader Ridwan of Aleppo with the help of Crusader forces based in Zardana. Zardana, which was a strategic fortress between Antioch and Aleppo, was apparently reoccupied by the Muslims soon after. However, in 1110, Tancred easily captured the town from the Muslims after the successful siege he laid against nearby Atarib. The two towns subsequently marked the eastern frontier of the Principality of Antioch. A few years later both towns suffered severe damage as a result the 1138 Aleppo earthquake. From the time of its conquest by the Crusaders, Robert fitz-Fulk, served as the lord of Zardana, and due to the town's strategic value, became a powerful figure in the Principality of Antioch.

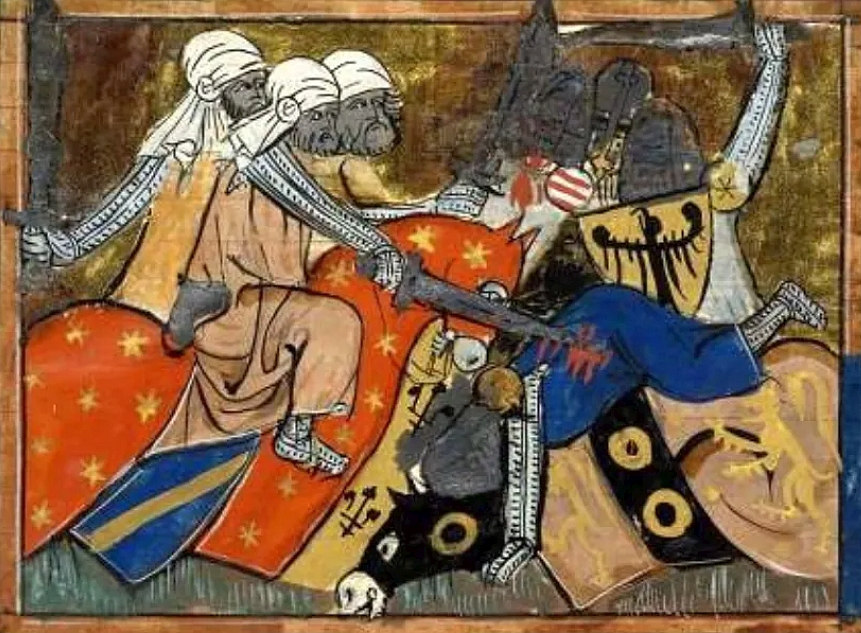
Artistic depiction of the "Field of Blood," a Muslim victory which included the capture of Zardana, from 1337

In early August 1119, the combined Muslim forces of Il-ghazi, the Artukid ruler of Mardin, and Toghtekin, the Burid ruler of Damascus, marched on Zardana after capturing Atarib. The Crusader garrison in the town put up resistance against Il-ghazi's army until surrendering on 12 August. The capture of Atarib and Zardana was a decisive Muslim victory, known as the "Field of Blood," and strengthened the defense of Aleppo. Robert was captured by the Muslim army as he approached Zardana and was later executed in Aleppo. Baldwin II of Jerusalem managed to capture Zardana from the Muslims in the early-1120s and by the time Bohemond II became ruler of Antioch in 1126. Baldwin's success was largely attributed to weakened Muslim control in the area as a result of political upheavals in Aleppo. Zardana was given to Robert's son, William fitz-Fulk.

The Muslim ruler of Aleppo, Aqsunqur al-Bursuqi led a successful attempt to recapture Zardana in the summer of 1125. The town was attacked by Sawar, an emir ("commander") of Zengi, the new Muslim ruler of Aleppo, during a plunder campaign against Crusader fortress towns between Antioch and Aleppo in 1133–34.

The 13th-century Syrian geographer Yaqut al-Hamawi visited Zardana in the 1220s, during Ayyubid rule, noting that it was "a small town in the neighborhood and to the west of Aleppo."

=== Modern era ===
In the early-mid 20th-century Zardana's houses were constructed of mud brick and wood, unlike most of the villages in the vicinity. The inhabitants largely depended on cultivating wheat and barley and raising livestock. During the French Mandate period, a resident of Zardana attacked a French military vehicle, prompting a French army operation to search for weapons being stored in the village. During the operation, the western part of the village was burned down and several men were detained. Most were pardoned upon the orders of an outside unit commander, but two residents were made to be executed by firing squad. One was killed, while the other was pardoned as a result of the intervention of an elder from nearby Saraqib. In June 2018, 40 civilians were killed in a Russian air strike on the rebel-held town during the Syrian civil war.

== Bibliography ==
- Asbridge, Thomas S. (2000). The Creation of the Principality of Antioch 1098-1130. Boydell & Brewer Ltd. ISBN 978-0-85115-661-3.
- Gibb, H. A. R. (1960). The Encyclopaedia of Islam. Vol. 1. Brill Archive.
- le Strange, Guy (1890). Palestine Under the Moslems: A Description of Syria and the Holy Land from A.D. 650 to 1500. Committee of the Palestine Exploration Fund. Archived from the original on 2013-10-17.
