= Talhiyeh =

Talhiyeh طلحية
- Village
- Location in Syria
- Country: Syria
- Governorate: Idlib
- District: Idlib District
- Subdistrict: Taftanaz Nahiyah

Population (2004)
  - Total: 3,437
- Time zone: UTC+2 (EET)
  - Summer (DST): UTC+3 (EEST)
- City Qrya Pcode: C3933

Talhiyeh (Arabic: طلحية) is a Syrian village located in Taftanaz Nahiyah in Idlib District, Idlib. According to the Syria Central Bureau of Statistics (CBS), Talhiyeh had a population of 3437 in the 2004 census.
