= Taltuneh =

Taltuneh تلتونة
- Village
- Location in Syria
- Coordinates: 36°1′9″N 36°35′18″E
- Country: Syria
- Governorate: Idlib
- District: Idlib District
- Subdistrict: Maarrat Misrin

Population (2004)
  - Total: 638
- Time zone: UTC+2 (EET)
  - Summer (DST): UTC+3 (EEST)
- City Qrya Pcode: C3940

Taltuneh (Arabic: تلتونة) is a Syrian village located in Maarrat Misrin Nahiyah in Idlib District, Idlib. According to the Syria Central Bureau of Statistics (CBS), Taltuneh had a population of 638 in the 2004 census.
