= Sarmin =

Sarmin سَرْمِين
- Town
- Location in Syria
- Coordinates: 35°54′12″N 36°43′33″E
- Country: Syria
- Governorate: Idlib
- District: Idlib
- Subdistrict: Sarmin
- Elevation: 390 m (1,280 ft)

Population (2004)
  - Total: 14,530
- Time zone: UTC+2 (EET)
  - Summer (DST): UTC+3 (EEST)

Sarmin (Arabic: سَرْمِين, romanized: Sarmīn also spelled Sarmeen) is a town in northwestern Syria, administratively part of the Idlib Governorate, located 15 kilometers southeast of Idlib. It has an altitude of about 390 meters. Nearby localities include Binnish to the north, Talhiyah to the northeast, Afs to the east, Saraqib to the southeast, al-Nayrab to the south and Qminas to southwest. The Taftanaz Military Airbase is located 9 kilometers (5.6 mi) to the northeast.

According to the Syria Central Bureau of Statistics (CBS), Sarmin had a population of 14,530 in the 2004 census. It is the only locality in the Sarmin nahiyah ("subdistrict"). Its inhabitants are predominantly Sunni Muslims.

== History ==
=== Medieval period ===
Sarmin was the site of a major military confrontation between the Crusaders and the Seljuk Turks. In the 13th century the town was celebrated, though small, and the inhabitants were Ismailis, according to Yaqut al-Hamawi. The Ayyubid ruler of Hama and scholar Abu'l-Fida described Sarmin as a town with much land and dependencies, with very fertile soil. The town had a Friday mosque and lacked walls. In 1355 Sarmin was visited by Ibn Battuta, who wrote of the abundance of trees, mostly olives, growing there. Soap-making was widely practiced, and their "brick soap" was exported to Damascus and Cairo. In addition, a perfumed soap, colored red and yellow, was produced. Cotton products were also made. He also made reference to a "fine" mosque with nine domes.

=== Syrian Civil War ===
Sarmin was shelled during the Syrian Civil War, and one of its mosques was severely damaged. On August 12, 2017, unidentified people killed seven White Helmets in a raid on their office here. A school was hit by artillery, killing 5 children on January 1, 2020.

== Bibliography ==
- le Strange, Guy (1890). Palestine Under the Moslems: A Description of Syria and the Holy Land from A.D. 650 to 1500. Committee of the Palestine Exploration Fund.
