= Bhora =

Bhora بحورى
- Village
- Location in Syria
- Country: Syria
- Governorate: Idlib
- District: Idlib District
- Subdistrict: Ma'arrat Misrin

Population (2004)
  - Total: 1,341
- Time zone: UTC+2 (EET)
  - Summer (DST): UTC+3 (EEST)
- City Qrya Pcode: C3937

Bhora (Arabic: بحورى) is a Syrian village located in Maarrat Misrin Nahiyah in Idlib District, Idlib. According to the Syria Central Bureau of Statistics (CBS), Bhora had a population of 1,341 at the 2004 census.
