= Kafr Nabi =

Kafr Nabi كفر نبي
- Village
- Location in Syria
- Coordinates: 36°3′27″N 36°36′39″E
- Country: Syria
- Governorate: Idlib
- District: Idlib District
- Subdistrict: Ma'arrat Misrin

Population (2004)
  - Total: 1,542
- Time zone: UTC+2 (EET)
  - Summer (DST): UTC+3 (EEST)
- City Qrya Pcode: C3948

Kafr Nabi (Arabic: كفر نبي) is a Syrian village located in Maarrat Misrin Nahiyah in Idlib District, Idlib. According to the Syria Central Bureau of Statistics (CBS), Kafr Nabi had a population of 1542 in the 2004 census. It is a predominantly Druze village.
