= Taftanaz Air Base =

Taftanaz Air Base قاعدة تفتناز الجوية العسكرية
- IATA: none; ICAO: none

Summary
- Airport type: Military
- Owner: (Syria) Syrian Armed Forces
- Operator: Syrian Air Force
- Location: Taftanaz, Idlib Governorate
- In use: 1940-present
- Elevation AMSL: 1,027 ft (313 m)
- Coordinates: 35°58′20″N 036°46′59″E

Map
- Location in Syria

Runways
Direction	Length		Surface
Direction	ft	m	Surface
00/00	0,000	0,000	Concrete

Taftanaz Air Base is an airbase located 1.7 miles (2.7 km) south of Taftanaz, Idlib Governorate and 1.8 miles (2.9 km) east of Ta'um, Idlib Governorate, Syria.

Taftanaz was home to two squadrons of Mil-8/17 Hip helicopters until its capture by the Syrian Opposition.

Led by fighters from the Al-Nusra Front and an Ahrar al-Sham battalion, Syrian rebels overran Taftanaz during the second week of January 2013.

On 6 February 2020, the Turkish Armed Forces constructed a military installation on the premises of the airbase, as Ba'athist Syrian forces advanced toward it during the 2020 Northwestern Syria offensive. It was targeted with airstrikes by the Syrian Air Force just hours after being constructed.

On 2 March 2020, the Syrian Observatory for Human Rights reported a Syrian Government attack on Taftanaz Airbase leaving one Turkish soldier dead and three wounded.

== See also ==
- List of Syrian Air Force bases
