= Maarrat Misrin Subdistrict =

Administrative area in Idlib, Syria

Maarrat Misrin Subdistrict ناحية معرة مصرين Maaret Tamsrin
- Nahiyah
- Location in Idlib Governorate

- Location in Syria
- Country: Syria
- Governorate: Idlib
- District: Idlib District

Population (2004)
  - Total: 57,859
- Time zone: UTC+2 (EET)
  - Summer (DST): UTC+3 (EEST)
- Nahya pcod: SY070005

Maarrat Misrin Subdistrict (Arabic: ناحية معرة مصرين) is a subdistrict (Arabic: نَاحِيَة, romanized: nahiyah) located in Idlib District in Idlib, Syria. The sub-district itself is also referred to as Maaret Tamsrin. According to the Syria Central Bureau of Statistics (CBS), Maarrat Misrin Subdistrict had a population of 57,859 in the 2004 census. The seat of the sub-district is located in the Maarrat Misrin town located south of the nahiya. Significant settlements in the nahiya include Killi, Kafr Aruq, Harbanoush, Maarrat al-Ikhwan, Kaftin, and Kafr Yahmul villages where camp clusters were set up to house internally displaced persons (IDPs) throughout the Syrian Civil War. Additionally, to the east side of the nahiya, 17 large IDP settlements, collectively referred to as of Sheikh Bahr Camps was built, which reportedly came under significant neglect through lack of international aid and natural disasters such as storms and flooding.

== List of significant settlements ==
Latest census data for Syria was collected in 2004. As the nahiya saw major clashes, flight of asylum seekers, settlement of IDPs and relocation of villages, and the ongoing voluntary returns of refugees, the population numbers are likely to be very inaccurate but nevertheless provide a sense of the settlement sizes before the Syrian Civil War.

English name	Arabic name	Population	English name	Arabic name	Population
Batenta	باتنته	1165	Kaftin	كفتين	2346
Bhora	بحورى	1341	Killi	كللي	7157
Harbanoush	حرنبوش	3785	Maarrat Misrin	معر تمصرين	17,519
Hazano	حزانو	2593	Maarrat al-Ikhwan	معارة الاخوان	1831
Kafrehmul	الكفر_كفريحمول	3179	Murin	مورين	46
Kafr Jales	كفر جالس	2770	Ram Hamdan	رام حمدان	1774
Kafr Nabi	كفر نبي	1542	Taltuneh	تلتونة	638
Kafriya	كفريا معرتمصرينل	4404	Zardana	زردنا_مشهد	5769

== Syrian Civil War ==
Between late 2012 and early 2013, as part of broader rebel advances in Idlib Governorate, rebel forces under the umbrella of Free Syrian Army took control of almost the entire nahiya. Throughout the later stages of the war, it remained as one of the inner territories under rebel control, governed by Hay’at Tahrir al-Sham (HTS). Many IDPs from Aleppo Governorate, as well as the southern governorates, were settled into the nahiya throughout the war.

Kafriya Village, located at the southern boundary of the Nahiya, as a predominantly Shia settlement, uniquely stayed under SAA and loyalist militia control alongside the larger Al-Fu'ah village located in the Binnish Nahiya, staying under siege for three years, signifying the last stronghold of government forces in the Idlib Governorate. On 2018, the residents and militias of the village were evacuated through a deal brokered between Iran and Türkiye in exchange for over 1500 prisoners of war held by SAA. Emptied village was resettled with IDPs from other, predominantly Sunni settlements, resulting in the change in the ethnic composition of the nahiya, making it an almost exclusively Sunni dominated area as opposed to its significant Shia population before the Syrian Civil War.

Other settlements within the district were bombed multiple times by Russia and Syrian Arab Army munitions, resulting in UN reporting war crimes committed against civilians. In 2024, news of inhumane treatment and torture by the governing militant bodies was also reported.
