= Kafr Kila =

Kafr Kila may refer to:

- Kafr Kila, Syria, a village in northern Syria
- Kafr Kila, Lebanon, a village in Lebanon
