= Murin =

Murin may refer to

- Murin (surname)
- Murin, Idlib, a village in Syria
- Morrin, Iran, a village in Iran
- Murin-an, a garden in Kyoto, Japan
- Šoldra, an Easter bread from Silesian cuisine

== See also ==
- Morrin (disambiguation)
