= Murin, Idlib =

Murin, Idlib مورين
- Village
- Location in Syria
- Coordinates: 35°59′5″N 36°33′42″E
- Country: Syria
- Governorate: Idlib
- District: Idlib District
- Subdistrict: Maarrat Misrin

Population (2004)
  - Total: 46
- Time zone: UTC+2 (EET)
  - Summer (DST): UTC+3 (EEST)
- City Qrya Pcode: C3946

Murin, Idlib (Arabic: مورين) is a Syrian village located in Maarrat Misrin Nahiyah in Idlib District, Idlib. According to the Syria Central Bureau of Statistics (CBS), Murin, Idlib had a population of 46 in the 2004 census.
