= NBC News team kidnapping in Syria =

2012 event during the Syrian Civil War

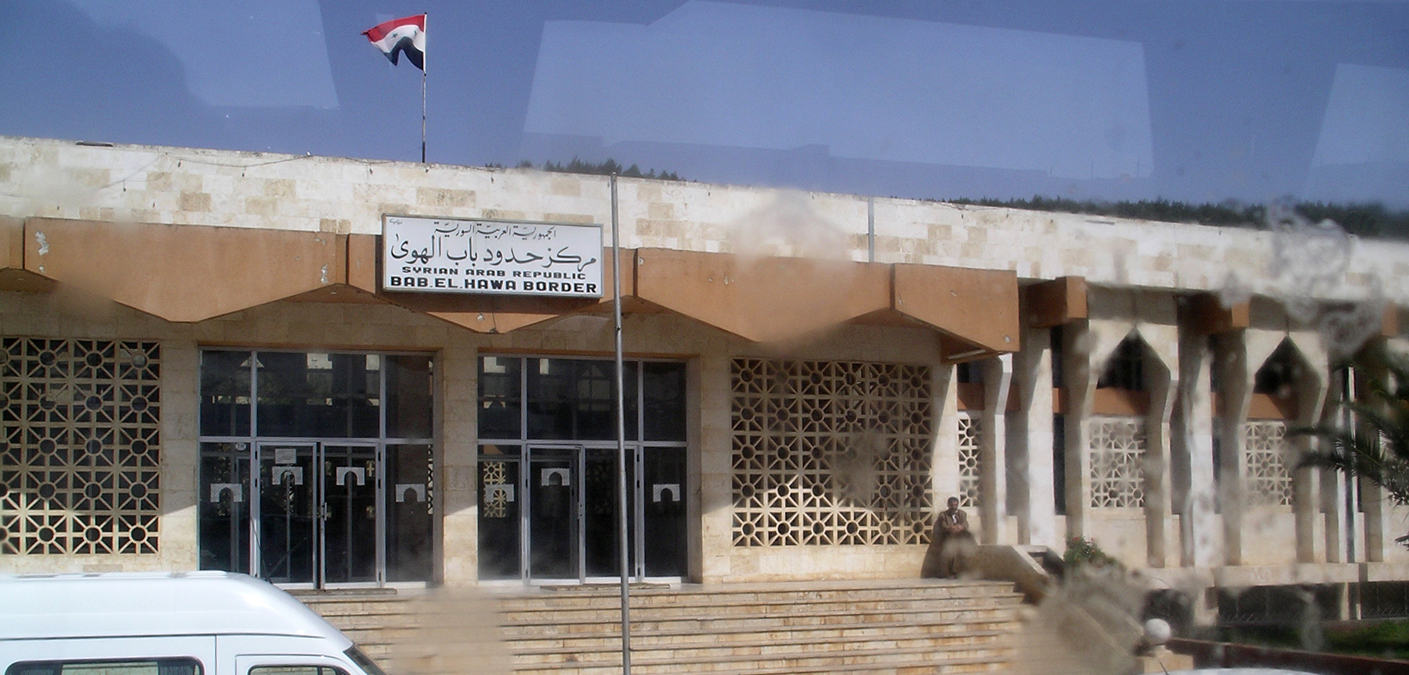
Bab al-Hawa Border Crossing

The NBC News Team kidnapping in Syria took place in late 2012 in the midst of the Syrian Civil War, when US journalist Richard Engel, chief foreign correspondent of NBC News, with his five-member reporting crew were abducted by armed militants.

Taken hostage on 13 December 2012 near the Bab al-Hawa Border Crossing when crossing into Syria, Richard Engel and his crew members – Aziz Akyavaş, Ghazi Balkiz, John Kooistra, Ian Rivers and Ammar Cheikh Omar – were detained in the vicinity of Ma'arrat Misrin in northern Idlib. Five days later, the six journalists managed to escape during a firefight at a checkpoint of Islamist Ahrar ash-Sham.

The case was controversial, as upon their release, Engel and his crew blamed a Shiite Shabiha group of Assad loyalists for the abduction. The narrative was, however, challenged, and it later turned out that they were most likely abducted by Free Syrian Army (FSA)-aligned Syrian rebel group North Idlib Falcons Brigade. It also became known that NBC News' investigation team had suspected the Sunni group from the outset, but withheld their intelligence.

== Early coverage ==
The kidnapping was first revealed to the public when Turkish journalist Cüneyt Özdemir tweeted about fellow Turkish journalist Aziz Akyavaş having disappeared. Turkish newspaper Hürriyet ran a news report on 16 December 2012 that was picked up by Turkish news channel NTV, Chinese news agency Xinhua, and U.S. blogs Daily Kos and Breitbart, among others.

=== News blackout ===
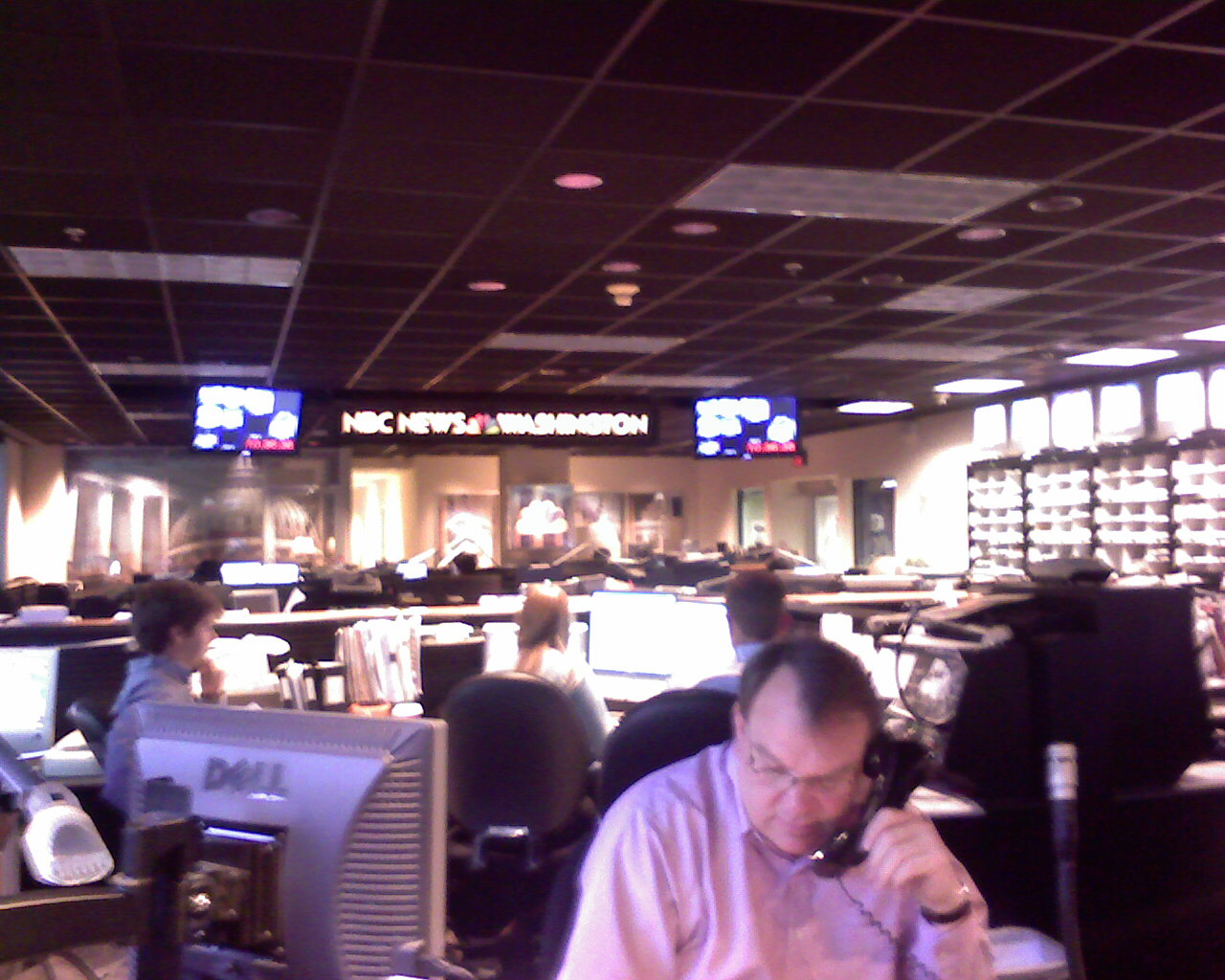
NBC News Washington Bureau

Following the disclosure, NBC News asked every reporter inquiring about the Hürriyet report to participate in a news blackout. They also asked Twitter users to take down related tweets. U.S. online magazine Gawker, among others, broke the news blackout, referring to the news already being out in the public. Gawker's author John Cook emphasized that – unlike in the case of the 2008 kidnapping of New York Times reporter David Rohde – the rationale offered in off-the-record conversations didn't "indicate a specific, or even general, threat to Engel's safety."

Human Rights Watch emergencies director Peter Bouckaert criticized the outlets which ran reports ahead of the captives' release. He defended the news blackout, arguing that though they go “against the journalistic instinct to report the news", they often do save lives. In contrast, fellow war correspondent Robert Young Pelton criticized the news blackout as a "clumsy attempt to cover collective corporate ass and mitigate bad publicity," maintaining that no one could show blackouts help protect captives.

== Release and early eyewitness accounts ==
Following their release on late Monday, 17 December, Engel and his crew returned to Turkey. NBC immediately published a statement announcing they were "safely out of the country". Associated Press spread an amateur video that had apparently been posted earlier that week by the hostage-takers on YouTube.

While Aziz Akyavaş spoke at a news conference in Turkey, Engel, Kooistra and Balkiz had their first appearance on NBC's morning show Today. In his Today interview, Engel said that while crossing back into Syria, they were captured by around 15 men, who "literally jumped out of the trees and bushes" and dragged them out of their car, killing one of the rebels who accompanied the crew. During their captivity near the village of Ma'arrat Misrin, they remained physically unharmed, but were blindfolded and bound, and were subjected to mock executions.

The kidnappers had talked "openly about their loyalty to the government" of Syrian president Assad, and said they wanted to exchange them for four Iranian agents and two Lebanese members of the Amal Movement. Engel said he therefore had "a very good idea" about who his captors were: members of the Shabiha militia, who are loyal to Assad, trained by Iran's Revolutionary Guard and allied with the Lebanon-based group Hezbollah.

NBC wrote in a statement that Engel and his crew freed themselves when, during a relocation, their vehicle ran into a checkpoint of the fundamentalist rebel group Ahrar al-Sham, and that during a firefight, "two of the captors were killed, while an unknown number of others escaped." The rebels then helped escort the crew to the border with Turkey.

=== Reactions ===
U.S. ambassador to the United Nations, Susan E. Rice, wrote on Twitter that she was relieved for Engel and his crew, adding that: "The situation for Syria's people remains dire. They, too, deserve to be free."

== Later interviews ==
In one of the several interviews of team members with NBC News, producer Ghazi Balkiz recounted that the firefight that eventually led to their liberation was for him the most "nerve-wracking" moment, despite being personally subjected to mock executions before. It became clear that the NBC team was initially captured near the Bab al-Hawa Border Crossing, and that five days later, they used the "chaotic minutes" of the firefight to break out of the van and take cover.

In the April 2013 edition of Vanity Fair, Engel recounted his experience in an editorial, "The Hostage".

== Early doubts ==
While the network and Engel were thought to have followed "a consistent clear-cut narrative on the kidnapping," Jamie Dettmer of The Daily Beast challenged NBC's version only days later. The NBC version, he wrote, "omits much and is at odds with what security sources involved in the freeing of the group say happened," referring to unnamed sources who also claimed the network was trying to present the incident in the best possible light, masking a series of basic security lapses.

Furthermore, according to Dettmer's unnamed sources, NBC's security advisers had been convinced that there was at least some involvement of "rogue members of the rebel FSA." NBC's security contractor Pilgrims Group had already focused on the area of Ma'arrat Misrin and urged FSA contacts to set up checkpoints to box the captors in, pointing out that Engel had been supportive of the uprising against Assad. The sources praised the fundamentalist rebel group Ahrar al-Sham for having done "a brilliant job" during the subsequent firefight.

== 2015 revision of the course of events ==
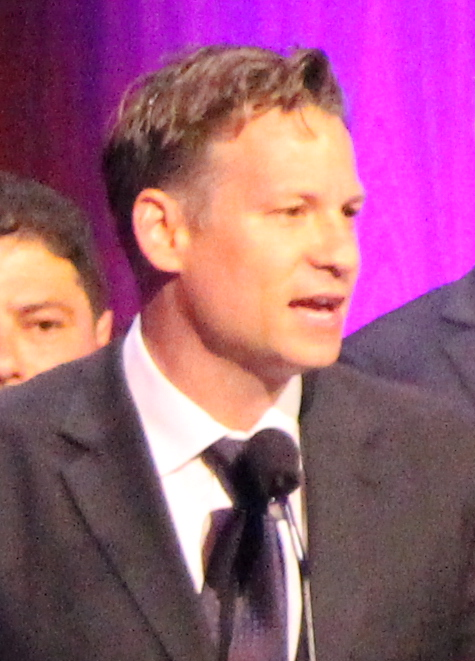
Richard Engel receiving the 2015 Peabody Award for NBC's coverage of ISIL

More than two years later, in April 2015, NBC News revised its narrative of the 2012 kidnapping, stating that it was highly likely that Engel and his team were abducted by a Sunni rebel group rather than by pro-regime Shabiha. Engel explained that their abductors had "put on an elaborate ruse to convince us they were Shiite shabiha militiamen". He upheld that they were rescued by Ahrar al-Sham, stating that a "bearded gunman" he referred to as the Islamist group's local commander Abu Ayman had approached and told them they were safe now.

Before this, the New York Times had conducted several dozen interviews which suggested that the NBC team "was almost certainly taken by a Sunni criminal element affiliated with the Free Syrian Army." The suspect group was named as the North Idlib Falcons Brigade, led by Azzo Qassab and Shukri Ajouj, who were said to have a history of smuggling and other crimes. According to current and former employees, NBC executives had already been informed of Ajouj and Qassab's possible involvement during the kidnapping. NBC had also received GPS data showing the captives being held in a chicken farm that was widely known by local residents and other rebels as being controlled by the rebel group. Nevertheless, NBC had put Richard Engel on the air with an account blaming Shiite captors. This decision was criticized by some.
