= Afs, Idlib =

Afs آفس
- Village
- Location in Syria
- Coordinates: 35°54′21″N 36°48′27″E
- Country: Syria
- Governorate: Idlib
- District: Idlib District
- Subdistrict: Saraqib

Population (2004)
  - Total: 6,338
- Time zone: UTC+2 (EET)
  - Summer (DST): UTC+3 (EEST)
- City Qrya Pcode: C3920

Afs (Arabic: آفس); also spelled Afes, is a Syrian village located in Saraqib Nahiyah in Idlib District, Idlib. According to the Syria Central Bureau of Statistics (CBS), Afs had a population of 6,338 in the 2004 census.

== Syrian Civil War ==
During the Northwestern Syria offensive in 2020, the village of Afes was a major target due to its strategic highway location. Syrian army troops looted and destroyed most of the homes and planted mines to attempt to discourage people from returning. By December 2020, a Turkish military outpost had been established in the village. On 27 February 2022, two people were killed and two others were injured after Syrian Arab Army forces bombed the village.
