= Abdul-Razzaq Awad =

Syrian lawyer and politician (born 1988)

- عبد الرزاق عوض

Member of the People's Assembly
- Incumbent
- Assumed office 5 October 2025
- Constituency: Idlib

Personal details
- Born: Abdul-Razzaq As'ad Awad; 1988 (age 37–38) Idlib, Syria
- Party: Independent
- Education: University of Aleppo (BA)

Abdul-Razzaq As'ad Awad (Arabic: عبد الرزاق أسعد العوض; born 1988) is a Syrian lawyer, humanitarian and politician who has served as a member of the People's Assembly for the constituency of Idlib since October 2025.

== Early life ==
Awad was born in Idlib in 1988. He obtained a law degree from the University of Aleppo in 2012 and later earned a diploma in relief and humanitarian work from Rushd University in Istanbul in 2014.

Following the beginning of the Syrian revolution in 2011, Awad participated in the protest movement in Idlib before becoming involved in humanitarian and development work. During the Syrian civil war, he worked with several Syrian humanitarian organizations, including Rahmaa Baynahum Association, Violet Organization (Banafsej), Syria Relief, and Action For Humanity, focusing on relief programs and community initiatives.

On 19 November 2018, Awad was arrested by the Syrian Salvation Government, the de facto administration in parts of Idlib at the time. The authorities stated that his detention was related to a lawsuit filed by beneficiaries of a livelihood project implemented by the Violet Organization, alleging financial misconduct involving approximately US$46,000. The organization rejected the allegations, stating that the claims were motivated by personal disputes and that Awad had acted within the framework of humanitarian work. He was later released after 13 days, following public criticism of his detention.

=== Fall of the Ba'athist-led regime ===
Following the fall of the Assad regime in December 2024, Awad participated in the 2025 parliamentary election and was elected as a representative for Idlib on October 2025.
