= Kafrsajna =

Kafrsajna كفرسجنة
- Town
- Location in Syria
- Coordinates: 35°31′34″N 36°35′19″E
- Country: Syria
- Governorate: Idlib
- District: Maarrat al-Nu'man District
- Subdistrict: Hish Nahiyah

Population (2004)
  - Total: 8,935
- Time zone: UTC+2 (EET)
  - Summer (DST): UTC+3 (EEST)
- City Qrya Pcode: C4110

Kafrsajna (Arabic: كفرسجنة) is a Syrian town located in Hish Nahiyah in Maarrat al-Nu'man District, Idlib. According to the Syria Central Bureau of Statistics (CBS), Kafrsajna had a population of 8,935 in the 2004 census.
