= Sarmin Subdistrict =

Sarmin Subdistrict ناحية سرمين
- Nahiyah
- Location in Idlib Governorate

- Location in Syria
- Country: Syria
- Governorate: Idlib
- District: Idlib District

Population (2004)
  - Total: 14,530
- Time zone: UTC+2 (EET)
  - Summer (DST): UTC+3 (EEST)
- Nahya pcod: SY070006

Sarmin Subdistrict (Arabic: ناحية سرمين) is a Syrian nahiyah (subdistrict) located in Idlib District in Idlib. According to the Syria Central Bureau of Statistics (CBS), Sarmin Subdistrict had a population of 14,530 in the 2004 census.
