= Kafr Kila, Syria =

Kafr Kila كفر كيلا
- Village
- Location within Syria
- Coordinates: 36°8′35″N 36°34′22″E
- Country: Syria
- Governorate: Idlib
- District: Harem
- Subdistrict: Kafr Takharim Nahiyah

Population (2004 census)
  - Total: 2,037
- Time zone: UTC+2 (EET)
  - Summer (DST): UTC+3 (EEST)

Kafr Kila (Arabic: كفر كيلا, also spelled Kafr Kile) is a town in northwestern Syria, administratively part of the Idlib Governorate, located north of Idlib. Nearby localities include Kafr Takharim to the southwest, Qurqania to the southeast, Barisha to the northeast, Qalb Loze to the north, Harem to the northwest and Isqat and Salqin to the west. According to the Syria Central Bureau of Statistics, Kafr Kila had a population of 2,037 in the 2004 census. Its inhabitants are predominantly members of the Druze community.

Kafr Kila's inhabitants, like most Druze in the area, work primarily in agriculture and cultivate olives and cumin. The village contains several Byzantine ruins. Of these ruins include an ornate basilica, with an entrance topped by a particularly decorated lintel.

During the Syrian civil war, Kafr Kila's residents provided shelter for internal refugees. In 2014, although the Idlib region (except for Idlib and small pockets of territory) was largely under opposition control, the Free Syrian Army (FSA) had not entered Kafr Kila or other Druze villages because the villages maintained their neutrality in the conflict and hosted many displaced families from neighboring towns. However, towards the end of 2013, militants from the Islamic State of Iraq and the Levant (ISIL), a Salafi jihadist organization, largely became dominant over the FSA and captured Kafr Kila along with other Druze-majority villages in the area. They reportedly demanded that residents "announce their Islam" by converting their prayer houses into mosques and trimming their moustaches.

== See also ==
- Dead Cities

== Bibliography ==
- Nelles Guide (1999). Syria and Lebanon. Hunter Publishing, Inc. ISBN 3886181057.
- Socin, A. (1900). Palästina und Syrien: handbuch für Reisende. Karl Baedeker Firm.
- Salibi, K. (2005). The Druze: Realities & Perceptions. Druze Heritage Foundation. ISBN 1904850065.
