= Binnish Subdistrict =

Binnish Subdistrict ناحية بنش
- Nahiyah
- Location in Idlib Governorate

- Location in Syria
- Country: Syria
- Governorate: Idlib
- District: Idlib District

Population (2004)
  - Total: 35,166
- Time zone: UTC+2 (EET)
  - Summer (DST): UTC+3 (EEST)
- Nahya pcod: SY070002

Binnish Subdistrict (Arabic: ناحية بنش) is a Syrian Nahiyah (subdistrict) located in Idlib District in Idlib. According to the Syria Central Bureau of Statistics (CBS), Binnish Subdistrict had a population of 35,166 in the 2004 census.
