= Qurqania =

Qurqania قُورْقَانِيَا
- Town
- Location within Syria
- Coordinates: 36°8′19″N 36°36′45″E
- Country: Syria
- Governorate: Idlib
- District: Harem
- Subdistrict: Qurqania

Population (2004)
  - Total: 2,050
- Time zone: UTC+2 (EET)
  - Summer (DST): UTC+3 (EEST)

Qurqania (Arabic: قُورْقَانِيَا, romanized: Qūrqāniyā, also spelled Qurqanya or Korkania) is a town in Syria, administratively part of the Harem District of the Idlib Governorate. Qurqania is the administrative center of the Qurqania Subdistrict, which contained 13 localities with a collective population of 12,522 in 2004. According to the Syria Central Bureau of Statistics, Qurqania itself had a population of 2,050 in the 2004 census.
