= Taftanaz Subdistrict =

Taftanaz Subdistrict ناحية تفتناز
- Nahiyah
- Location in Idlib Governorate

- Location in Syria
- Coordinates: 36.013333°N 36.821667°E
- Country: Syria
- Governorate: Idlib
- District: Idlib District

Population (2004)
  - Total: 24,145
- Time zone: UTC+2 (EET)
  - Summer (DST): UTC+3 (EEST)
- Nahya pcod: SY070004

Taftanaz Subdistrict (Arabic: ناحية تفتناز) is a Syrian nahiyah (subdistrict) located in Idlib District in Idlib. According to the Syria Central Bureau of Statistics (CBS), Taftanaz Subdistrict had a population of 24,145 in the 2004 census.
