= Kafr Yahmul =

Kafr Yahmul كَفْر يَحْمُول
- Village
- Location in Syria
- Coordinates: 36.0594°N 36.6967°E
- Country: Syria
- Governorate: Idlib
- District: Idlib District
- Subdistrict: Ma'arrat Misrin

Population (2004)
  - Total: 3,179
- Time zone: UTC+2 (EET)
  - Summer (DST): UTC+3 (EEST)
- City Qrya Pcode: C3942

Kafr Yahmul (Arabic: كَفْر يَحْمُول, romanized: Kafr Yaḥmūl; also spelled, Kafrehmul) is a Syrian village located in Maarrat Misrin Nahiyah in Idlib District, Idlib. According to the Syria Central Bureau of Statistics (CBS), Kafr Yahmul had a population of 3179 in the 2004 census. Its inhabitants are predominantly Sunni Muslim.
