= Idlib Subdistrict =

Idlib Subdistrict ناحية مركز إدلب
- Nahiyah
- Location in Idlib Governorate

- Location in Syria
- Country: Syria
- Governorate: Idlib
- District: Idlib District

Population (2004)
  - Total: 126,284
- Time zone: UTC+2 (EET)
  - Summer (DST): UTC+3 (EEST)
- Nahya pcod: SY070000

Idlib Subdistrict (Arabic: ناحية مركز إدلب) is a Syrian nahiyah (subdistrict) located in Idlib District in Idlib. According to the Syria Central Bureau of Statistics (CBS), Idlib Subdistrict had a population of 126,284 in the 2004 census.
