= Abu al-Duhur Subdistrict =

Abu al-Duhur Subdistrict ناحية أبو الظهور
- Nahiyah
- Location in Idlib Governorate

- Location in Syria
- Coordinates: 35.7561°N 37.0231°E
- Country: Syria
- Governorate: Idlib
- District: Idlib District

Population (2004)
  - Total: 38,869
- Time zone: UTC+2 (EET)
  - Summer (DST): UTC+3 (EEST)
- Nahya pcod: SY070001

Abu al-Duhur Subdistrict (Arabic: ناحية أبو الظهور) is a Syrian nahiyah (subdistrict) located in Idlib District in Idlib. According to the Syria Central Bureau of Statistics (CBS), Abu al-Duhur Subdistrict had a population of 38,869 in the 2004 census.
