= Saraqib Subdistrict =

Saraqib Subdistrict ناحية سراقب
- Nahiyah
- Location in Idlib Governorate

- Location in Syria
- Country: Syria
- Governorate: Idlib
- District: Idlib District

Population (2004)
  - Total: 88,076
- Time zone: UTC+2 (EET)
  - Summer (DST): UTC+3 (EEST)
- Nahya pcod: SY070003

Saraqib Subdistrict (Arabic: ناحية سراقب) is a Syrian nahiyah (subdistrict) located in Idlib District in Idlib. According to the Syria Central Bureau of Statistics (CBS), Saraqib Subdistrict had a population of 88076 in the 2004 census.
