= Idlib Governorate =

Governorate in Syria

Idlib Governorate مُحافظة ادلب
- Governorate
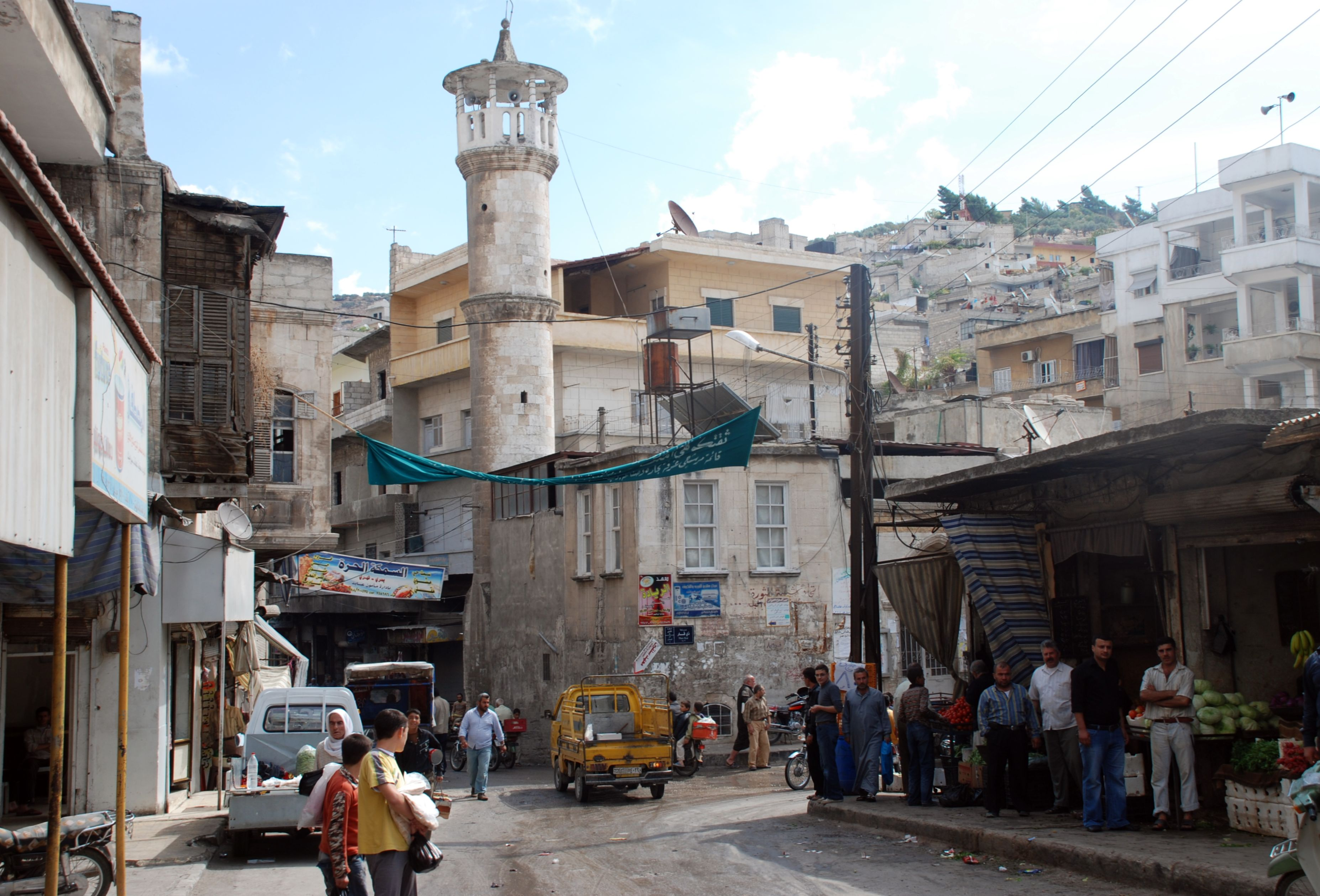
- A minaret above a market street in Salqin

- Seal

- Map of Syria with Idlib highlighted
- Interactive map of Idlib Governorate
- Coordinates (Idlib): 35.7°N 36.7°E
- Country: Syria
- Established: 17 November 1957
- Capital: Idlib
- Manatiq (Districts): 5

Government
  - Governor: Mohammad Abdul Rahman

Area
  - Total: 6,097 km^{2} (2,354 sq mi)
- Estimates range between 5,933 km^{2} and 6,097 km^{2}

Population (2011)
  - Total: 1,501,000
  - Density: 246.2/km^{2} (637.6/sq mi)
  - 2022 Estimate: 2,927,392
  - of Which, IDPs: 1,899,350
- Time zone: UTC+3 (AST)
- ISO 3166 code: SY-ID
- Main language(s): Arabic

Idlib Governorate (Arabic: مُحافظة ادلب, romanized: Muḥāfaẓat ʾIdlib) is one of the fourteen governorates of Syria. It is situated in northwestern Syria, bordering Turkey's Hatay Province to the north, Aleppo Governorate to the east, Hama Governorate to the south, and Latakia Governorate to the west. Reports of its area vary, depending on the source, from 5,933 square kilometres (2,291 sq mi)^{2} to 6,097 square kilometres (2,354 sq mi)^{2}. The provincial capital is Idlib.

The governorate contains many archaeological sites. Ebla is a Bronze Age site, and Al-Dana occupies the site of ancient Adennu. Bara and Serjilla are ancient sites, the latter among the Dead Cities, and Tell Touqan is another ancient site.

== History ==
Idlib's strategic position reflects its role in earlier periods, when it was a meeting point for trade caravans coming from Antioch, Apamea, Aleppo, Tell Afis and the Ghab Plain. From the third millennium BC the kingdom of Ebla linked the Mediterranean world with the Far East. The governorate holds about a third of Syria's monuments and archaeological sites, and the discovery of Ebla and its cuneiform tablets was a major archaeological event of the 20th century.

The area was later ruled by the Arameans, Assyrians, Hittites, Romans and Byzantines, and then by various Islamic states. More than 500 sites of the so-called Dead Cities are scattered across the governorate. Some are almost completely preserved, others survive only as limited ruins, and several castles remain in good condition.

The modern city of Idlib is traditionally said to have been founded in the 16th century by an Ottoman pasha, Ahmed Pasha Köprülü, after his army was defeated at Vienna. A captain in his army, Hammud ibn Hatim al-Dulaymi, is regarded as the ancestor of the al-Mu'allim family. The al-Fanar (or al-Fanri) and al-Ayashi families, both of Anatolian Turkish origin and known for their loyalty to the Ottomans, are counted with the al-Mu'allim family as the three founding families. Families from surrounding villages later settled in the town, which became known for its olive and sesame presses and its soap industry.

=== Modern Syria (1946–2011) ===
Idlib Governorate was separated from the neighboring Aleppo Governorate on 17 November 1957, during the reign of President Shukri al-Quwatli. In the early 1980s, the Idlib Governorate was one of the focal points of the Islamist uprising in Syria. Jisr ash-Shughur was the scene of a mass killing by Syrian security forces in 1980. On 9 March 1980, against a background of anti-government protests across Syria, inhabitants of Jisr ash-Shugur marched on the local Ba'ath Party headquarters and set it on fire. The police were unable to restore order and fled. Some demonstrators seized weapons and ammunition from a nearby army barracks. Later that day, after pounding the town with rockets and mortars, destroying homes and shops, and killing and wounding dozens of people, the Syrian Army Special Forces helicoptered in from Aleppo to regain control. At least 200 people were arrested. The following day, a military tribunal ordered the execution of more than a hundred of the detainees. In all, about 150–200 people were said to have been killed.

=== Syrian civil war (2011–2024) ===
The governorate was one of the main theatres of the Syrian civil war and changed hands repeatedly. By 30 November 2024 it had reportedly fallen entirely under opposition control.

==== Government and rebels (2011–2017) ====
Fighting began in late 2011, when the newly formed Free Syrian Army (FSA) took towns such as Saraqib, Sarmin, Ariha and Taftanaz. The government won the Battle of Idlib (2012) on 10 March 2012 but failed to regain the governorate in the April 2012 Idlib Governorate Operation, and a ceasefire lasted from 14 April to 2 June 2012. By April 2013 the FSA held Maarat al-Numan, Kafr Nabl and Darkush, while government forces kept Idlib city, Jisr ash-Shughur, Khan Shaykhun and the Abu al-Duhur airbase. The siege of Wadi Deif base was also lifted.

Rebels won the 2014 Idlib offensive and in March 2015 the al-Nusra Front and the Army of Conquest took Idlib city from government and Hezbollah forces.

Rebel factions then began fighting each other. In March 2016 al-Nusra Front and Jund al-Aqsa defeated the FSA's 13th Division at Maarat al-Numan. Jund al-Aqsa clashed with Ahrar al-Sham in October 2016, and in early 2017 Ahrar al-Sham and its allies fought Hayat Tahrir al-Sham (HTS), with Jund al-Aqsa joining as a third party from February.

==== Khan Shaykhun chemical attack ====
On 4 April 2017 an airstrike hit Khan Shaykhun, then held by HTS, and was followed by mass poisoning. The OPCW found that sarin had been used. The Idlib health authority reported at least 74 dead and more than 557 injured. It was the deadliest use of chemical weapons in the Syrian civil war since the Ghouta chemical attack of 2013. The United Nations, several governments and Human Rights Watch blamed the forces of Bashar al-Assad, who denied the accusation.

==== Rebel predominance (2017–2018) ====
In July 2017 HTS defeated Ahrar al-Sham, taking Idlib city, the Bab al-Hawa Border Crossing and most of the Turkish border area. From September 2017 Syrian and Russian air raids on rebel towns intensified, and Turkey carried out a military operation in October and November. By August 2018 the governorate was almost entirely in opposition hands, mainly the National Front for Liberation (over 50,000 fighters) and HTS (an estimated 12,000 to 30,000). A demilitarized zone agreed in September 2018 temporarily froze the front.

==== Government offensives (2019–2024) ====
On 26 October 2019 a US Joint Special Operations Command raid in the governorate, near the Turkish border, led to the death of Islamic State leader Abu Bakr al-Baghdadi.

Government forces then advanced in the 2019 offensive, which displaced nearly a million civilians, and in the 2020 offensive. By 8 February 2020 rebels held only a little more than half of the governorate. The remaining enclave was widely described in the press as Syria's "last rebel stronghold". Its loss was seen as a threat to the position of Turkish president Erdoğan, since the Turkish-controlled zones further north would be next. After the collapse of the Syrian pound, the Turkish lira became legal tender in the governorate on 15 June 2020.

==== Rebel full takeover (2024) ====
Tahrir al-Sham's Military Operations Command launched the "Deterrence of Aggression" offensive against the Syrian government on 27 November 2024, re-capturing Saraqib, Abu al-Duhur, Maarat al-Numan, Khan Shaykhun and Kafr Nabl. By 30 November, they had taken full control over the province. Even though, between November and December 2025, ISIS continued to attack the Governorate.

== Geography ==
Parts of the westernmost regions of the governorate form part of the Ghab Plain, through which the Orontes River flows. The region forms a transitional zone between the forested mountains of the western littoral and the Syrian desert to the east. The Jabal Zawiya highland region lies in the south-central areas of the governorate.

Most of the rock in the governorate dates from the Cenozoic. The west is an uplifted plateau, while the east forms part of the Aleppo plateau, which slopes eastward to the Al-Matkh and Jabbul depressions. Faulting and volcanic activity have shaped the area, and it was hit by earthquakes in 1796 and 1822.

Tree cover thins out toward the east. Native species include terebinth, oak, strawberry tree and hawthorn. Forest survives only on the Qusayr plateau and in scattered patches on Jabal al-Zawiya, and it has been cleared from Jabal al-Wastani.

Mammals include the striped hyena, golden jackal, red fox, hare, hedgehog and wild boar. Resident birds include partridge and sparrows, and migratory birds include sandgrouse, starlings and ducks. Birds of prey such as kites, falcons, eagles and owls are also present. Wildlife is declining because of hunting.

=== Climate ===
Summers are hot (29 to 37 °C or 84 to 99 °F) and winters mild (5 to 8 °C or 41 to 46 °F), with an annual mean of 16 to 18 °C (61 to 64 °F). Most rain falls in winter and decreases eastward, from about 700 mm at Jisr ash-Shughur to about 250 mm at Abu al-Duhur. The climate is humid on the Qusayr plateau, semi-humid around Jisr ash-Shughur, semi-arid across most of the governorate and arid in the east.

The Orontes and its tributary the Abyad cross the governorate, but their narrow, deep valleys limit their use. Springs are common west of Jabal al-Zawiya and feed the Ghab and Ruj plains. The Orontes valley also has hot mineral springs at Hammamat al-Sheikh Issa. The Idlib plains hold large groundwater reserves.

=== Relief ===
- The Qusayr plateau in the northwest is made of limestone, with an average height of about 800 metres (2,600 ft). Many valleys run from it to the Orontes River.
- The Harem Mountains in the north follow the eastern edge of the Orontes valley. They include Jabal Barisha (657 metres (2,156 ft)), Jabal al-A'la (819 metres (2,687 ft)) and Jabal al-Wastani, whose highest point, Jabal al-Hanash, reaches 847 metres (2,779 ft).
- Jabal al-Zawiya overlooks the Ghab Plain and has many volcanic craters. It averages about 750 m and peaks at Jabal al-Nabi Ayyub (940 metres (3,080 ft)).
- The plains cover 2,885 kilometres (1,793 mi). The northern Idlib plains, at about 300 metres (980 ft), are among the most fertile and densely populated in Syria. The southern plains are gently undulating and partly covered by volcanic rock. The Ruj plain (825 kilometres (513 mi), 220 metres (720 ft)) is a closed polje that was once marshland, and it now drains through an artificial tunnel to the Orontes.

=== Settlements ===
Idlib is the provincial capital; other major settlements include Abu al-Duhur, Al Hamdaniyah, Ariha, Harem, Jisr ash-Shughur, Kafrsajna, Khan Shaykhun, Maarat al-Numan, Salqin, Saraqib and Taftanaz.

=== Districts ===

The governorate is divided into five districts (manatiq), which are further divided into 26 sub-districts (nawahi):

- Idlib District (7 sub-districts)
  - Idlib Subdistrict
  - Abu al-Duhur Subdistrict
  - Binnish Subdistrict
  - Saraqib Subdistrict
  - Taftanaz Subdistrict
  - Maarrat Misrin Subdistrict
  - Sarmin Subdistrict
- Ariha District (3 sub-districts)
  - Ariha Subdistrict
  - Ihsim Subdistrict
  - Muhambal Subdistrict
- Harem District (6 sub-districts)
  - Harem Subdistrict
  - Al-Dana Subdistrict
  - Salqin Subdistrict
  - Kafr Takharim Subdistrict
  - Qurqania Subdistrict
  - Armanaz Subdistrict
- Jisr al-Shughur District (4 sub-districts)
  - Jisr al-Shughur Subdistrict
  - Bidama Subdistrict
  - Darkush Subdistrict
  - Al-Janudiyah Subdistrict
- Maarat al-Numan District (6 sub-districts)
  - Maarat al-Numan Subdistrict
  - Khan Shaykhun Subdistrict
  - Sinjar Subdistrict
  - Kafr Nabl Subdistrict
  - Al-Tamanah Subdistrict
  - Hish Subdistrict

== Demographics ==
As per the 2004 Syrian census the population was 1,258,400. A 2011 UNOCHA estimate put the population at 1,501,000, though this has likely changed since the start of the war. The inhabitants are mostly Sunni Muslims, although there is a significant Christian minority. Notably, two villages within the governorate were unique in having a predominantly Twelver Shia Muslim population amounting to around 15,000 residents. During the Syrian Civil War, the villages came under siege and saw eventual relocation of all its residents to neighboring governorates, then held by the regime forces. There are also local Druze communities including 18 villages around Harim Mountains area such as Kafr Nabi, that was estimated to be around 32,000, but thought to have diminished to around 1500 as the communities faced discrimination due to their perceived support of the Assad Regime during the civil war.

== Gallery ==
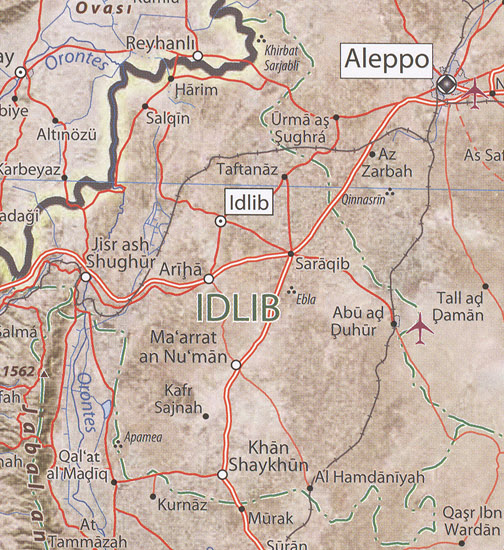
Map of Idlib governorate

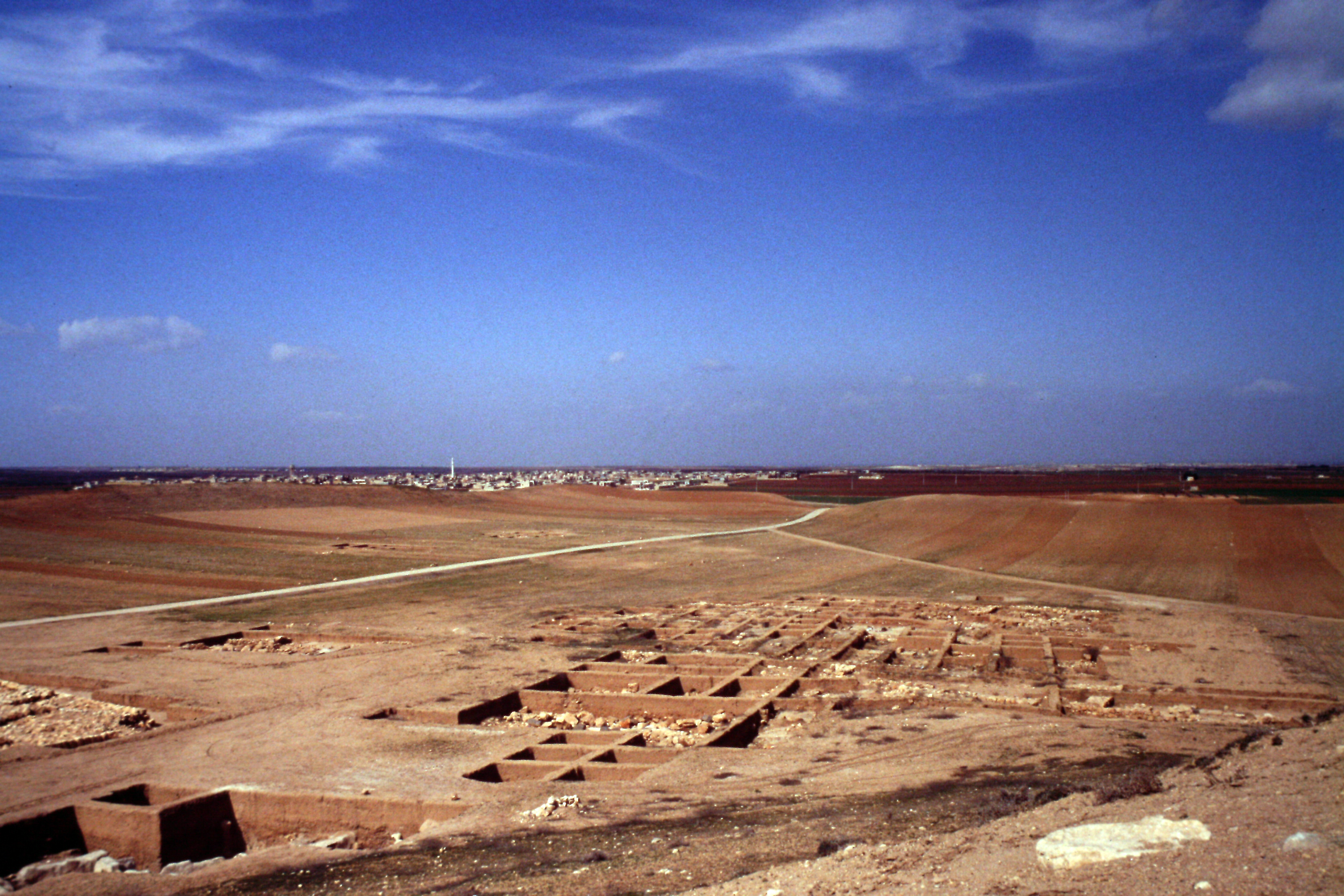
Ruins of Ebla

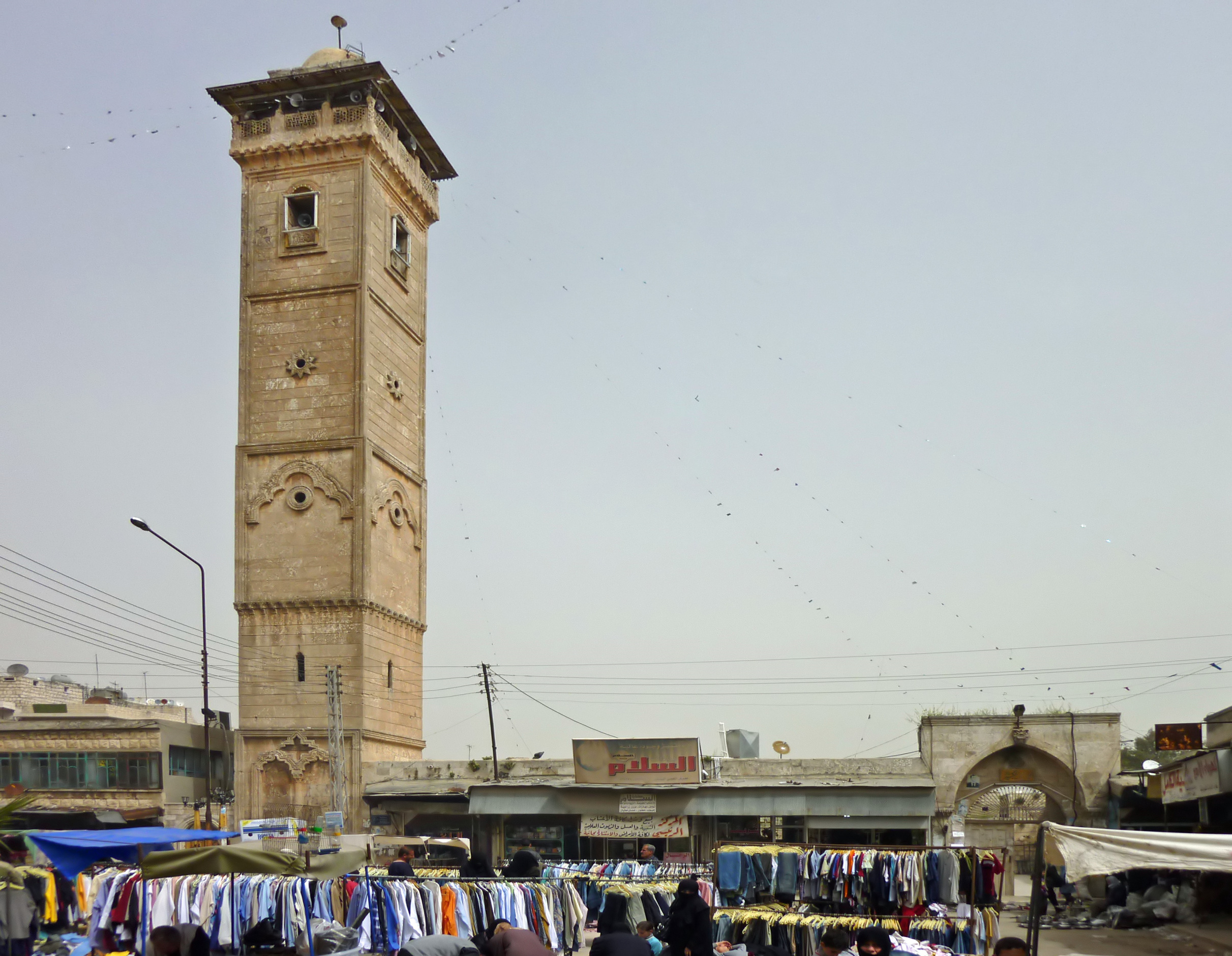
The Great Mosque of Maarat al-Numan

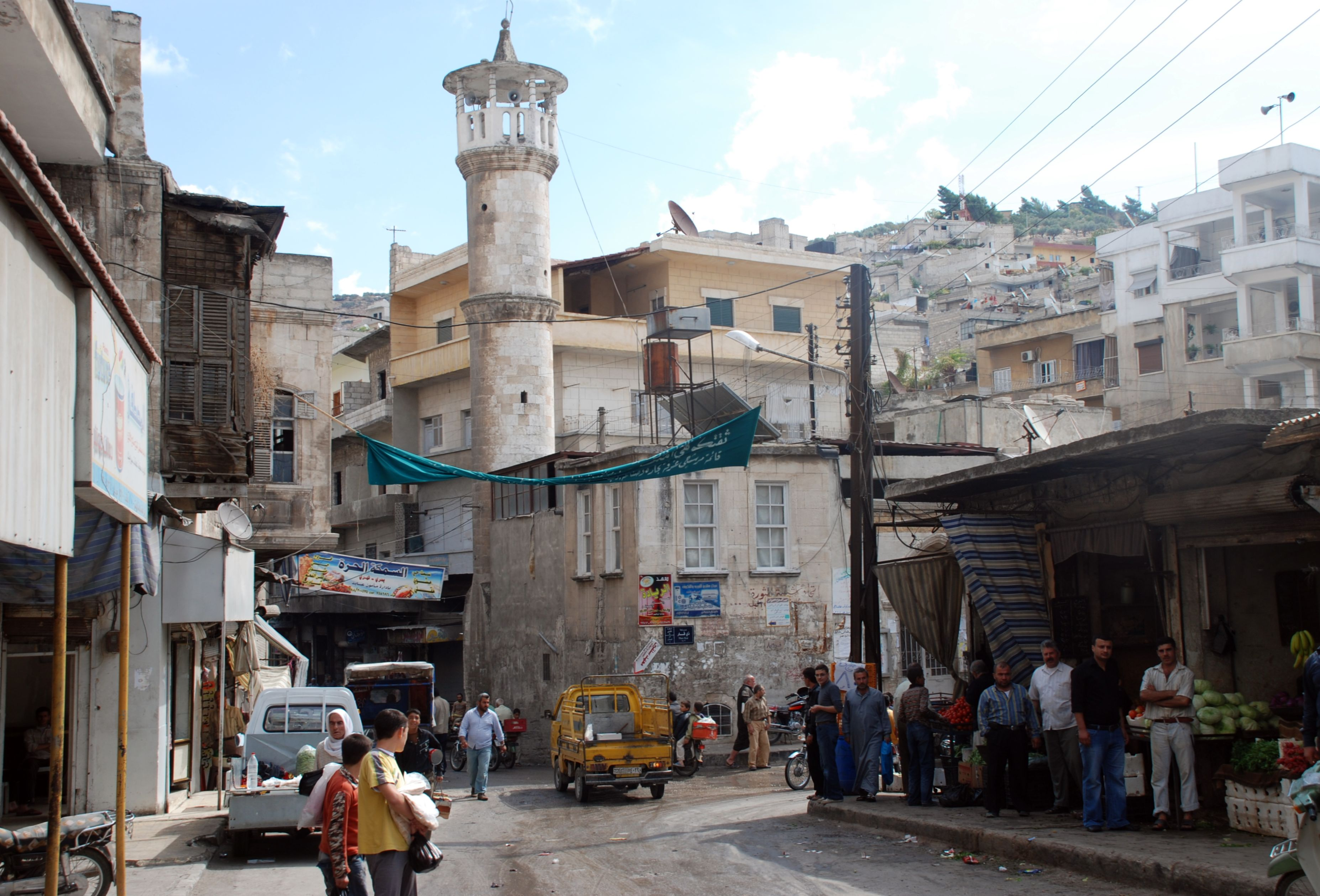
Salqin

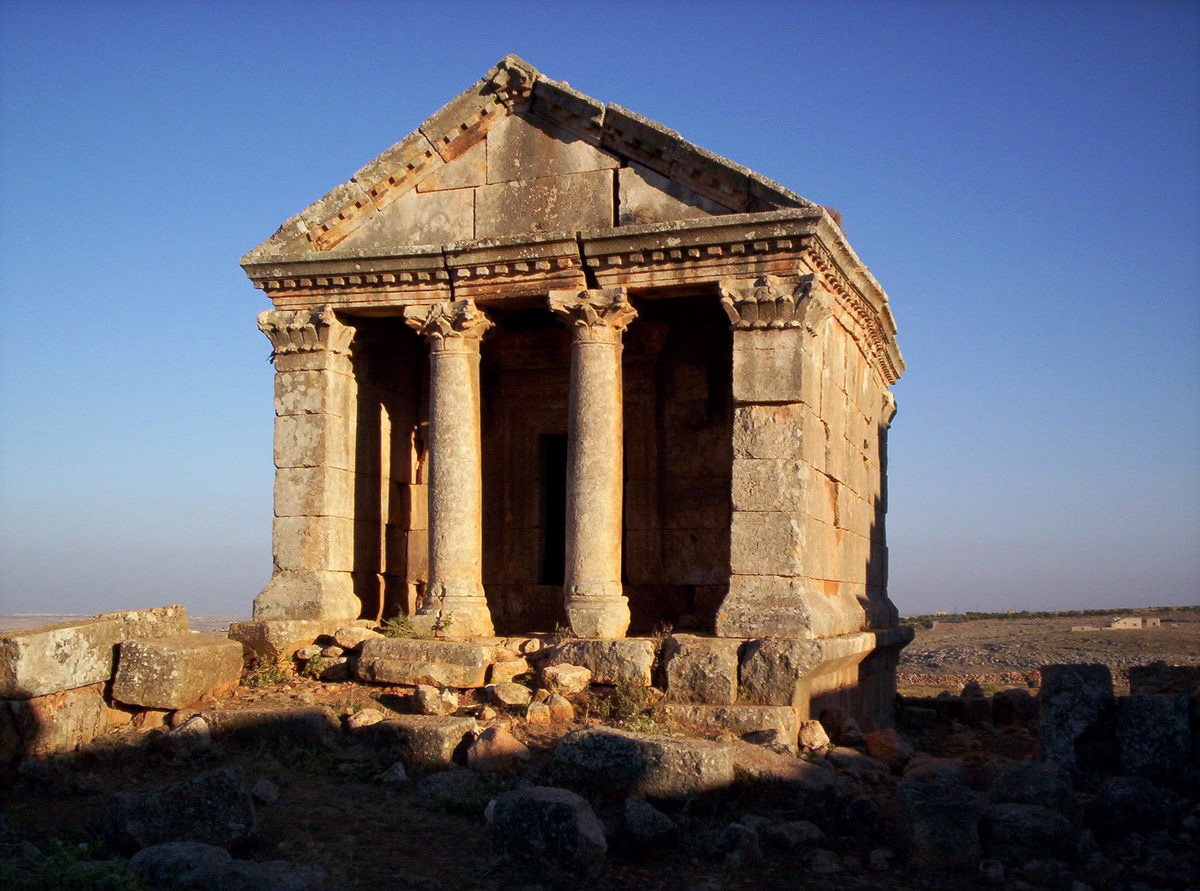
Byzantine temple in Idlib

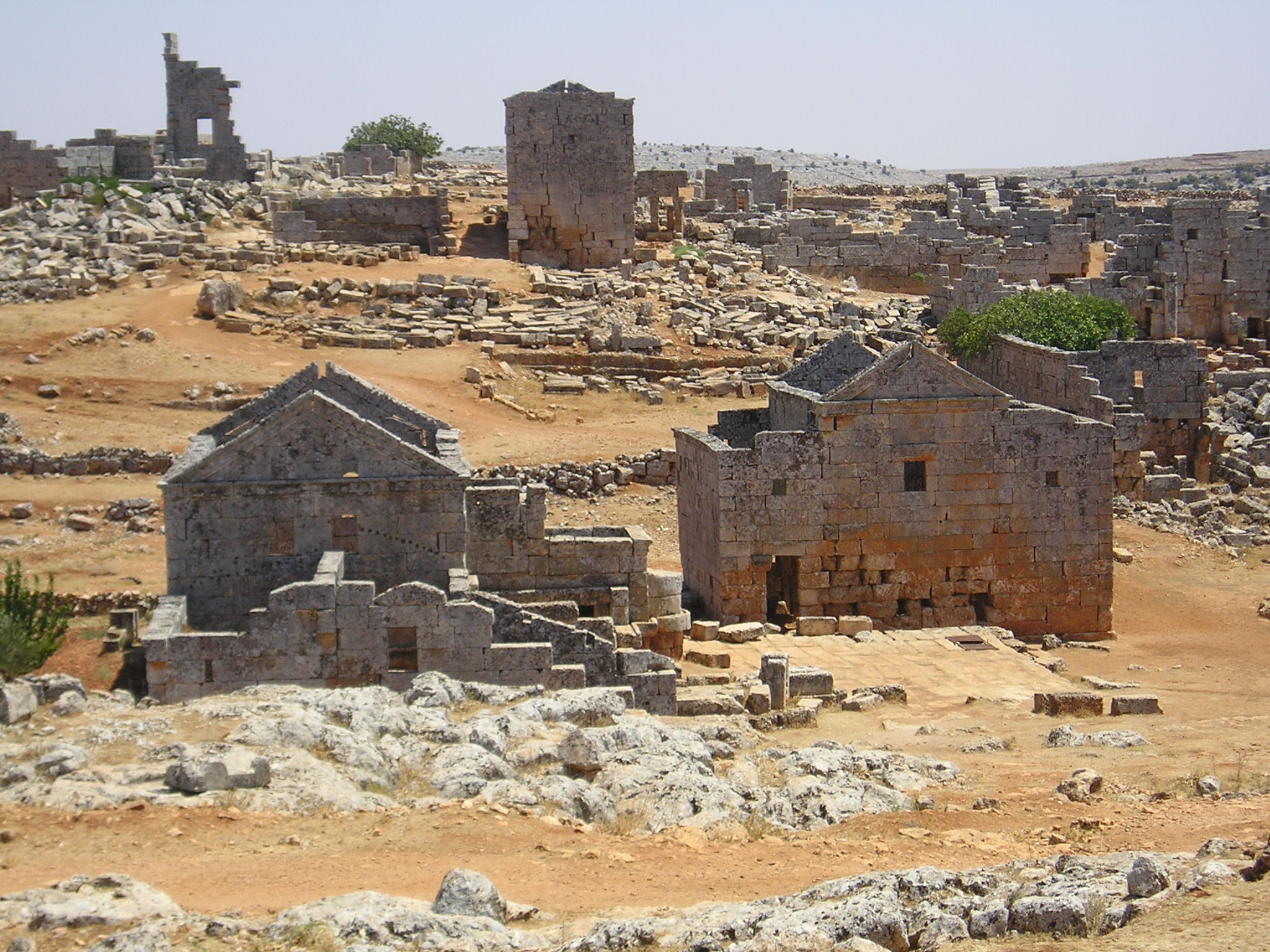
Ruins of Serjilla
