= Idlib District =

Idlib District منطقة ادلب
- District
- Map of Idlib District within Idlib Governorate
- Coordinates (Idlib): 35°56′N 36°38′E
- Country: Syria
- Governorate: Idlib
- Seat: Idlib
- Subdistricts: 7 nawāḥī

Area
  - Total: 1,436.94 km^{2} (554.81 sq mi)

Population (2004)
  - Total: 384,929
  - Density: 267.881/km^{2} (693.809/sq mi)
- Geocode: SY0700

Idlib District (Arabic: منطقة ادلب, romanized: manṭiqat Idlib) is a district of the Idlib Governorate in northwestern Syria. The administrative centre is the city of Idlib. At the 2004 census, the district had a population of 382,929.

== Sub-districts ==
The district of Idlib is divided into seven sub-districts or nawāḥī (population as of 2004):

- Idlib Subdistrict (ناحية ادلب): population 126,284.
- Abu al-Duhur Subdistrict (ناحية أبو الظهور): population 38,869.
- Binnish Subdistrict (ناحية بنش): population 35,166.
- Saraqib Subdistrict (ناحية سراقب): population 88,076.
- Taftanaz Subdistrict (ناحية تفتناز): population 24,145.
- Maarrat Misrin Subdistrict (ناحية معرتمصرين): population 57,859.
- Sarmin Subdistrict (ناحية سرمين): population 14,530.
