= Timeline of the Syrian civil war (2021) =

The following is a timeline of the Syrian civil war for 2021. Information about aggregated casualty counts is found at Casualties of the Syrian civil war.

== January ==
On 1 January 2021, the UK-based Syrian Observatory for Human Rights (SOHR) reported that a bomb exploded near a Russian military base in the Tal Saman area south of Ayn Issa, wounding several Russian soldiers. Prior to the blast, SOHR said an explosives-laden pickup truck was parked just outside the Russian base by two men who then fled the area. Guardians of Religion Organization claimed responsibility for the attack through a message circulated on social media. SOHR's Rami Abdel Rahman described it as "the first such direct attack against a Russian base in northeastern Syria".

On 3 January, three buses were attacked by suspected Islamic State militants on a highway in central Syria, leading to the death of nine people. According to state sources, the dead included a thirteen-year-old girl, with four others injured, while SOHR said seven of the dead were soldiers and there were 16 wounded, and local sources nine military deaths. The Jerusalem Post reported that Western intelligence sources linked the rise in militancy to local Arab Sunni tribal anger at executions for suspected IS ties of dozens of local nomads by Iranian Shi'ite militia in the area.

On the night of 6 January, according to SOHR, Israeli airstrikes left three Iran-backed militia dead.

On 9 January, according to SOHR, IS insurgents attacked pro-government soldiers in the town of Al-Shola, in the Deir ez-Zor Governorate, during a sweeping operation looking for jihadist cells. The attack left at least 7 National Defence Forces militiamen dead and an unknown number wounded.

On 11 January, Syrian army forces and allies infiltrated and raided Army of Victory positions in Al-Ghab Plain, northwestern Hama, killing 11 fighters of the rebel group.

On 13 January, Israeli air strikes were allegedly launched in eastern Syria, close to the Iraqi border, according to the SOHR. Apart from the strike being carried out close to the Syria-Iraq border, it was also reported that it had hit sites in eastern Syria's Deir Ezzor region as well. At least 18 strikes were launched across multiple locations in eastern Syria, the organization added. According to France 24, at least seven Syrian soldiers and 16 allied fighters were killed during the Israeli raid over night. Later in the day, it was reported by the SOHR that the death toll had reached fifty-seven people, while 37 others were injured, with some sustaining critical injuries. However, the airstrikes that were carried out by Israel against Iranian-backed targets, were believed to have been executed with intelligence given by the United States, a senior US intelligence official disclosed.

Also on 13 January, there were clashes in Tafas in the western Daraa countryside, between the rival Zoubi and Kiwan clans, leading to the deaths of four people from both sides.

On 14 January, SOHR reported that Liwa Fajr al-Islam rebel fighters captured three government fighters in the western Daraa countryside, as part of a renewed rebel offensive.

On 18 January, according to the Israeli Meir Amit Intelligence and Terrorism Information Center, IS militants fired machine guns at Syrian soldiers east of Hama. Six soldiers were killed.

On 22 January, the state-run SANA news agency claimed that Israel launched a fresh missile strike that hit central Syria's Hama province. The Syrian government said at least four family members were killed during the attack, including two children, with four others injured. However, the Syrian military maintained that its air defense systems managed to intercept most of the Israeli missiles. There was no immediate comment from Israel regarding the incident.

On 23 January, government 4th Division fighters launched a new offensive in the western countryside of Daraa, targeting the towns of Tafas, Muzayrib and Al-Yadudah. On 24 January, SOHR reported that negotiations broke down between pro-government forces and rebel factions (in particular Fajr al-Islam and the Central Committee), resulting in clashes in the cities of Tafas and Muzayrib. Several rebel fighters were killed and at least 4 members of the 4th Division were confirmed to have died, according to the Syrian Observatory. Rebels attacked 4th Armoured Division checkpoints north of Saham al-Jawlan in the Daraa countryside and on the Nafia-al-Shajara road in the Yarmouk Basin.

Also on 24 January, IS militants targeted a Syrian army bus on the road between Palmyra and Deir ez-Zor. At least 12 Syrian soldiers were killed according to SOHR. Although the Islamic State (IS) militants have been blamed, no group has officially claimed responsibility for the attack yet, according to GardaWorld.

On 25 January, as reported by SOHR, in Al-Mayadeen, 13 ISIS members were killed by Russian airstrikes. In addition ~17 Fajr Al-Islam members and 4 Syrian militia members were killed in the clashes. The Russian military is acting as a mediator in these events, and has threatened a military incursion if compliance is not given.

On 26 January, according to SOHR, Syrian government forces and IS militants clashed in the Homs desert, leaving at least 7 pro-government fighters and 11 IS militants dead.

On 29 January, the Syrian government rejected UN proposals as part of constitutional talks to resolve the Civil War.

30–31 January saw a weekend of violence in Northwest Syria.

On 30 January, a car bomb in Turkish-controlled Afrin, killed eight, including four children; SDF/PKK forces were believed responsible. According to SOHR, four NDF militiamen were killed by an IS landmine in the Syrian desert. Forces of the Syrian army's 5th Corps came under attack by IS militants east of Homs, resulting in the death of at least one officer and several other soldiers according to Halab Today TV. Also on 30 January, according to SOHR, a car-bomb exploded in the Turkish proxy held town of Afrin, killing at least 8 and injuring several others.

On 31 January, 11 people were killed in two separate car-bomb attacks in the cities of Azaz and Bizaah (just outside Al-Bab) in the Turkish-backed SNA-held area of Northern Syria. The attack in Azaz was near a building used by SNA fighters. Turkish officials have blamed the attack on the SDF. Five Turkish-backed fighters died in the attack in Bizaah.

Meanwhile, in Syria's northeastern city of Hassakeh, Deir Ez Zor province, one person was reportedly killed and four others injured, when Syrian Democratic Forces (SDF) shot at pro-government protesters. The protesters were demonstrating against the siege on their neighborhood in Hassakeh city, as dozens of men were seen taking to the streets. According to Kurdish sources, though, the incident occurred as pro-government forces attacked an SDF security point, leading to the death of one government fighter, while the Turkish Daily Sabah reported that the Syrian who died was a regime security member killed by the YPG forces after they had opened fire on pro-Assad protesters.

Also on the 31st, according to SOHR, several military formations the Peace Spring area of NW Syria, under the banner of Ahrar al-Sham, stated they had suspended operation. The statement was issued by the groups "Liwaa Al-Qadisiyah" (which had previously operated under the banner of IS), "Liwaa Al-Khattabe", "Liwaa Suqur Al-Sunnah", and "Liwaa Ahl Al-Athar".

== February ==
On 1 February, an IS IED was activated against an SDF vehicle in central Al-Raqqah. One fighter was killed and another was wounded.

In February, IS operatives fired at an SDF fighter in the Al-Basira area, about 25 km southeast of Deir ez-Zor. The fighter was killed. In addition, a member of the SDF civilian council in the Al-Basira area was targeted by machine gun fire about 15 km north of Al-Mayadeen. He was killed.

On 2 February, a truce between SDF forces and government forces lifted a three-week SDF siege of government-held neighbourhoods in Kurdish-controlled Hasaka and Qamishli. The same day as reported that the Syrian government announced that any man (including displaced people) who did not do military service before the age of 43 must pay $8,000 or lose their property without notice or any right to appeal.

On 3 February, SOHT reported that a Turkish soldier died of wounds sustained in an attack on 31 January by unnamed gunmen. Also on 3 February, IS launched an attack on Syrian forces in Hama province, killing 19 regime personnel including 11 fighters of the Iranian-backed Baqir Brigade according to SOHR. Since March 2019, the death toll of regime personnel and allied militia forces as a result of IS attacks has now reached at least 1,200, the Observatory reported.

A suspected IS VIED targeted a pro-government checkpoint near the Al-Maleha area, south of Deir Ez Zor. The attack left over 10 members of Liwa Al-Quds and the Syrian Army's 17th division dead and others wounded. Exchange of heavy fire was also reported between the IS members and regime fighters. Separately, the SDF disclosed that during operations this week, it had apprehended four suspected members of the Islamic State (IS) in Deir al-Zor and Hasakah provinces of Syria.

Also on 3 February, airstrikes by Israel. An official speaking on the condition of anonymity maintained that the Israeli missiles were launched from over the Golan Heights, without disclosing what the actual target was. No casualties were recorded during the attack, only material damages were said to have been caused, according to The Jerusalem Post. However, the SANA state news agency cited a military source who maintained that the Syrian anti-air defenses were able to intercept most of the Israeli missiles. An SDF intelligence operative was targeted by gunfire in the Diban area, about 5 km east of Al-Mayadeen. He was killed.

On 4 February, according to SOHR, a Turkish officer was killed while he was dismantling an IED that was intended to detonate at the entrance to the headquarters of "al-Hamza Division". The same day was also reported that IS operatives attacked Syrian army positions near the Al-Taym oil field, leaving 3 special forces of the Syrian army and air force dead.

On 5 February, according to SOHR, four Syrian soldiers of the 17th Division were killed and six others were injured, after IS cells attacked them while they were combing Al-Tayarat area in Al-Mayadeen desert. The same day according to SOHR, eight jihadists of the Turkistan Islamic Party (TIP) were killed, as government forces targeted their bus by a guided missile on Kherbet Al-Naqous frontlines in Sahl Al-Ghab in the western countryside of Hama.

On 6 February, according to SOHR, four government soldiers were killed, including a lieutenant, while eight others were injured as a result of a Jaysh al-Nasr surprise attack in the village of Al-Fatirah in western countryside of Hama. Also on 6 February, an SDF vehicle was targeted by machine gun fire in Shahil, about 10 km north of Al-Mayadeen. One SDF fighter was killed and another was wounded. IS operatives also captured an SDF intelligence operative in the Basira area, about 15 km north of Al-Mayadeen. He was interrogated and then executed.

On 7 February, according to SOHR, government forces and loyal militias launched an attack in the early hours of Sunday morning on positions of the TIP on Al-Haloubi and Al-Ankawi frontlines in Sahl Al-Ghab. The TIP repelled the attack; five government soldiers were killed and at least nine others were injured, while TIP lost three fighters and others injured. Two other government soldiers, including a lieutenant, were also killed by sniper fire in a separate incident, according to SOHR. Also on 7 February, an SDF fighter was targeted by gunfire in the village of Shahabat, in the eastern rural area of Deir ez-Zor. He was killed.

On 8 February, according to SOHR, four Asayish members were killed and three others were wounded in an IS attack on a checkpoint in the western countryside of Al-Raqqa. In addition, SDF soldiers were attacked by IS operatives in the Basira area, about 30 km southeast of Deir ez-Zor, leaving one fighter dead. Also on 8 February, according to SOHR a Syrian army column came under attack by IS militants near Faydat Ibn Muwayni’ in Al-Mayadeen desert, while they were combing the region. The attack left 26 government soldiers and Liwa al-Quds militiamen dead, and also left 11 IS militants dead. The SOHR called this the deadliest IS attack so far in 2021.

On 9 February, according to SOHR, four SDF fighters were killed after IS militants attacked their checkpoint in the Deir ez-Zor countryside.

On 10 February, five people were killed and four wounded by surface-to-surface missiles fired by Russian forces in Hmeimim on the oil refineries in the village of Tarhin controlled by Turkish-backed rebels in Aleppo countryside.

On 11 February, according to Kurdish sources, four fighters of Asayish were killed in an IS attack northeast of Al-Raqqah.

On 13 February, an IED was activated by IS militants against an SDF vehicle in the Basira area, about 15 km north of Al-Mayadeen. An SDF commander and a fighter were killed. Six other fighters were wounded. The vehicle was destroyed.

On 14 February, an International Coalition UAV killed a senior IS operative in the Rawda region, about 50 km northeast of Deir ez-Zor. The dead operative was Abu Yassin al-Iraqi, 33, from Ramadi, Iraq. Al-Iraqi was IS's official in charge of the region east of the Euphrates River and of oil in the area. Also on 14 February, it was reported that the SDF transferred over 100 alleged ISIL fighters to Iraqi authorities at a border crossing a week prior. All of the detainees were Iraqi nationals that were held in SDF detention centers.

Between 14 and 15 February, the SOHR reported the deaths of Syrian soldiers and militiamen that were killed in fights with IS in the Syrian desert. According to SOHR, in response to the killings the Russian air force conducted several bombing runs on IS positions.

Early on 15 February, the Syrian army said its air defences had managed to intercept Israeli missiles launched from the Golan and Galilee that targeted Damascus, residents reported large explosions on the southern edge of the city, an army defector said the strikes hit military targets in Al-Kiswah where Iranian-backed militias are based, and SOHR reported that at least nine pro-government fighters were killed. Opposition media said the targets were 1st Corps positions, showed video of Syrian air defences falling short and hitting a residential neighbourhood, and reported several injuries in Al-Kiswah as well as damage to Iranian military equipment. Israel did not confirm the strikes, which The Jerusalem Post said were the sixth Israeli attributed attack in 2021.

On 17 February, the SOHR reported the deaths of 4 government soldiers after fighting off an IS ambush on the Damascus-Deir Ezzour highway.

On February 17, 2021, an SDF fighter was targeted by machine gun fire in the Hajin area, about 50 km southeast of Al-Mayadeen. He was killed.

On February 18, 2021, an SDF fighter was targeted by gunfire in the Sabha area, in Deir ez-Zor's eastern rural area. He was killed.

On 19 February, according to SOHR, Russian jets conducted over 100 airstrikes on IS positions in the eastern Raqqa desert leaving at least 12 militants dead. the same day an IED was activated against Syrian soldiers in the Salamiyah desert region, about 30 km southeast of Hama. One soldier was killed.

On 20 February, IS cells attacked the Iranian-backed Syrian 'Al-Qura' militia, leaving four militiamen dead according to SOHR. The same day, it was revealed that earlier in the month, as part of a prisoner swap between Israel and the Syrian government, Israel paid Russia $1.2m for doses of the Sputnik V vaccine for use by the Syrian government.

On February 22, 2021, an SDF intelligence operative was targeted by gunfire in Shahil, about 10 km north of Al-Mayadeen. He was killed.

On 23 February, the SOHR reported that Russian jets targeted the Al-Bara town in northern Syria's Idlib province. The attack is said to be the fourth Russian airstrike in Syria's Idlib this year. Meanwhile, in the outskirts of the village of Bzapour in the southern countryside of Idlib, one civilian was killed and many others wounded, during a rocket attack launched by Syrian government forces, according to SOHR.

Also on 23 February, two SDF fighters were captured in the Tel Hamis area and were executed. An SDF vehicle was targeted with an IED north of Raqqa, leaving two SDF fighters dead.

On 24 February, Eyad al-Gharib, a former Syrian intelligence agent was convicted by a German court due to his involvement in crimes against humanity. Al-Gharib was sentenced to four years and six months in jail. He was found to have been responsible for facilitating the arrest of 30 protesters and handing them over to a detention center in Damascus, in 2011. A second defendant, Anwar Raslan, is also being charged with the killing of 58 people, with 4,000 others injured, as well as other crimes against humanity.

On 25 February, the US military disclosed that it launched an attack on facilities used by Iran-backed militia groups in eastern Syria. According to the Pentagon, the attacks were carried out in response to a recent rocket attack in Iraq earlier in February, which led to the death of one civilian contractor, wounding several other coalition troops. The militia said one fighter had been attacked while SOHR said its sources reported 22 deaths and damage to three ammunition trucks.

On 28 February, the Syrian military stated that several Israeli missiles were launched from the Golan Heights, which targeted the Syrian capital Damascus. Most of the missiles were intercepted by the Syrian air defenses, Alarabiya News added. According to SOHR however, the airstrikes targeted an area south of Damascus, Sayyida Zeinab, occupied by Iranian Revolutionary Guards and Lebanese Hezbollah. However, no immediate casualties have been documented so far during the attack.

== March ==
On 1 March, the SOHR reported that one Syrian government soldier was killed and 2 were wounded after an armed attack on an air-force intelligence outpost in the eastern Daraa countryside.

On 2 March, the U.S. Ambassador to the U.N., Linda Thomas-Greenfield, urged that the status of tens of thousands detainees of the 10-year conflict in Syria be disclosed. During an informal high-level UN General Assembly meeting on human rights in Syria, she demanded the bodies of victims who lost their lives to be returned to their families. Thousands of Syrians are believed to have gone missing, with at least 14,000 others who have undergone torture, the Daily Sabah added.

Also on 2 March, fighters from the rebel Fateh al-Mubin Operations Room killed 3 government soldiers in the city of Saraqib, eastern Idlib, after launching a sniping operation.

On 3 March, the SOHR reported that unknown gunmen riding a motorcycle shot dead two SDF soldiers at a military checkpoint in Jadid Bakarah town in the eastern countryside of Deir Ezzor.

On 5 March, SOHR reported that four people were killed and 24 others were wounded with burns after surface-to-surface missiles were fired by Russian warships and Syrian government military barracks hit a Turkish-backed rebel-held oil market and refineries in Tarhin and Al-Hamaran near al-Bab, Aleppo Governorate. It was not immediately clear as to who was responsible for launching the attack, Al Jazeera added. According to SOHR also, it took firefighters several hours in order to extinguish the fire, which extended to about 180 oil tankers. The head of the SOHR Rami Abdul Rahman revealed that at least one of those who were killed during the blast was believed to be a Syrian rebel.

On 6 March, an SDF checkpoint was attacked by IS militants in the Al-Mayadeen area, killing one SDF soldier. SDF reinforcements were also ambushed by IS on approach to the area, leaving a further 6 SDF fighters dead and another 6 wounded.

On 7 March, 18 people were killed and 3 others were wounded, due to mines left by IS exploded in Rasm Al-Ahmar in eastern Hama Governorate. An SDF commander was also targeted by machine gun fire in the Diban area and was killed. IS militants also targeted a Syrian Army tank with an IED east of Salamiya resulting in the deaths of the entire tank crew.

On 8 March, the SOHR reported that IS militants attacked "Abu fadl al-Abbas" of the Iranian Revolutionary Guard in al-Aqoula area, killing at least one militiaman. Members of an IS cell also reportedly shot dead an SDF fighter in the market of Theban town, in the eastern countryside of Deir Ezzor.

On 9 March, the SOHR reported the death of a Syrian Army lieutenant of the 4th Division after he was targeted by unknown gunmen in the western Daraa country. Three Syrian Army soldiers were killed and at least 10 were wounded after clashes erupted on the Idlib front, after militants began to heavily shell Syrian army positions, according to SOHR.

On 10 March, UNICEF expressed alarm over the increasing number of families that are in need of humanitarian assistance as the Syria war is about to reach its 10th year mark. The report by UNICEF suggested that at least 12,000 had either been killed or injured, while displacing million others from school. Also, the agency has made an appeal for $1.4 billion for 2021, in order to provide assistance within Syria, as well its neighboring countries.

Separately, in a new survey conducted by the International Committee of the Red Cross (ICRC) of 1,400 Syrian nationals between the ages of 18 and 25 in Germany and Lebanon, half of the respondents had lost a family member or friends during the war.

On 11 March, IS militants attacked SDF headquarters in the village of Diban, killing one SDF fighter and wounding another.

On 12 March, IS launched a surprise attack against pro-government Iranian-backed militias in the Al-Mayadeen desert, resulting in the deaths of 7 militiamen, after the attack IS then burnt the bodies according to SOHR. Later in the day, SDF forces backed by coalition helicopters killed 6 IS militants in Deir ez-Zour province. Also on the same day, government forces attacked rebel forces with rockets in western Idlib leading to the deaths of 4 members of the 'National Liberation Front' rebel faction. Also on 12 March, IS militants broke into the house of an SDF intelligence operative in the Al-Sour area. They executed the SDF operative after interrogating him.

On 13 March, the SOHR reported that IS cells killed 2 SDF soldiers after targeting them with silenced pistols at the Al-Tabqa airport, west of Raqqa.

On 14 March, SOHR reported that rocket fire targeted an illegal oil market in Al-Hamaran near Jarabulus in Aleppo province, held by Turkish-backed rebels, leaving several civilians wounded and burned out trucks. Also on 14 March, IS operatives broke into the house of an SDF fighter north of Raqqa and killed him. IS also claimed abducting and executing a Syrian Army soldier near Al-Harak on the same day.

On 15 March, the United Kingdom announced new sanctions on six Assad government figures, its first autonomous sanctions since leaving the European Union. The sanctioned individuals were: foreign minister Faisal Miqdad, government media advisor Luna al-Shibl, businessmen Yassar Ibrahim and Muhammad Bara’ Al-Qatirji, Major General Malik Aliaa of the Republican Guard, and Major General Zaid Salah of the Syrian Army's 5th Corps.

Also on 15 March, according to SOHR, 13 IS militants were killed after the Russian airforce conducted around 80 airstrikes in the Syrian desert destroying IS caves and positions. The same day, IS claimed the fatal shooting of a Syrian government soldier in Daraa province and the wounding of a Syrian army officer.

On 16 March, a convoy of the Syrian Army's 4th Armoured Division was ambushed in Daraa province whilst en route to the town of Muzayrib. The attack left at least 21 soldiers dead and others wounded. On the same day, an IRGC commander and one of his escorts were killed by an IED blast east of Deir ez-Zour.

On 17 March, an SDF fighter was targeted with gunfire in Shahil, near Al-Mayadeen. He was killed.

On 18 March, hundreds gathered in the city of Daraa to mark the tenth anniversary of the beginning of the civil war that started as the anti-government demonstrations. Protesters chanted slogans against the government of President Bashar al-Assad.

On 19 March, during the 2020–2021 Ayn Issa clashes, three Turkish backed militants and a Turkish officer were killed after heavy clashes with the SDF on the Ayn Issa front. 2 SDF fighters were also killed in the fighting, according to SOHR. Two Syrian government soldiers were killed by unknown gunmen is the centre of Daraa city.

On 20 March, SDF forces were attacked by IS militants whilst celebrating 'Nowruz' (spring festival) in Jazrat Albu Hamid, near Raqqa. 3 SDF fighters were killed and 4 others were wounded.

On 21 March, government forces targeted a hospital in Atareb. During the attack, six civilians including a child were reported killed as a result of artillery fire by the government forces. Several medics were also wounded as a result of the attack. Among the wounded were five medical staff of the Syrian American Medical Society (SAMS). Following the deadly attack on the al-Atareb Surgical Hospital, the International Rescue Committee (IRC) issued a statement condemning the attack. They further urged the United Nations (UN), including world leaders to ensure that international laws are respect, as well as holding perpetrators accountable so as to prevent future violations. On the same day, Russian jets hit gas facilities in the town of Sarmada, and struck Qah with a surface-to-surface missile. In the city of Saraqib, a Syrian first lieutenant and another Syrian soldier were killed along with 5 others wounded after artillery bombardments by militants, according to HalabTodayTV on Twitter.

On the same day, two Syrian soldiers were abducted by IS in the Al-Sukhnah desert, Homs Governorate. They were interrogated and then executed. Another Syrian soldier was also abducted and executed near Al-Qaryatayn in the same region. SOHR reported that ISIL launched an attack on Iranian-backed militias in the Al-Mayadeen desert in eastern Deir ez-Zor, killing 2 fighters and injuring 7 others.

On 23 March, the SOHR reported that Syrian army and rebel factions traded rocket fire on the Idlib front and that a Syrian soldier had been killed in Saraqib after rebels launched another sniping operation.

On 24 March, the SOHR reported that a Syrian soldier had died on the Northern Latakia front due to a landmine explosion. He was the 2nd soldier to be killed by a landmine on the Latakia front within the past 24 hours.

On 26 March, the SOHR documented the deaths of 7 Syrian army militiamen and the wounding of 3 others after IS forces attacked their positions in the desert of Oqayrabat, in the eastern countryside of Hama.

On 27 March, the SAA began a rocket attack targeting HTS militants on the frontlines of Idlib. According to the SOHR, 5 HTS militants were killed in the attack. On the same day an SDF intelligence operative was targeted by gunfire and killed in Sweidan. A fighter of a Syrian army militia was also shot and killed in Dhiban.

On 28 March, the Syrian Kurdish forces launched an operation in northeastern Syria, where alleged family members of IS militants were staying. The operation, which was carried out at the al-Hol camp, was reported to have led to the arrest of at least nine people, including an IS recruiter. Also, intelligence, surveillance, and reconnaissance support were given to the SDF for the operation, by the US-led coalition combating IS. However, the SOHR reported that more than 30 people were apprehended, both men and women. About 5,000 security forces were deployed in Al-Hol, in order to protect the residents during the operation, which was expected to last for a minimum of 10 days, the Syrian Democratic Forces (SDF) stated.

On 29 March, the SOHR reported the deaths of two brothers, both members of the Syrian 4th Division, after gunmen targeted them on the road to Al-Ajami in the western countryside of Daraa.

On 30 March, $6.4bn in humanitarian aid was raised by International donors, at a virtual two-day conference for Syria, to assist Syrians ravaged by a decade of civil war. Germany topped the donation by pledging $2bn during the aid conference, while the US pledged $600 million. However, the funds were said to have been short of the $10 billion that the UN had aimed for.

== April ==
On 3 April, the SOHR documented the deaths of 13 ISIS members after the Russian airforce conducted over 70 airstrikes mostly in the Hama desert. On the same day, the SOHR also reported the death of an SDF member after he was targeted by IS militants in the al-Shafa area.

On 4 April, A British RAF drone targeted, with hellfire missiles, a small group of ISIL members in northern Syria, 50 miles west of Al-Hasakah, leaving several militants dead.

On 5 April, ISIL forces killed 3 SDF members after they launched an attack on an SDF patrol near Dhiban, Deir ez Zor. On the same day, IS operatives also attack the house of an SDF member killing him and his wife in the process.

On 6 April, the SOHR reported that a landmine explosion in Tal Tamr, between Qashqah and Al-Rihaniya left 4 Turkish soldiers killed and 7 others injured. The number of dead was expected to rise because of the severity of the wounds. In the same day, Syrian Democratic Forces/YPG forces targeted Turkish troops in Afrin killing two soldiers by a ATGM attack.

On 8 April, the SOHR monitored an attack on a Syrian air force intelligence checkpoint in the al-Quneitra countryside. Unidentified gunmen opened fire on the checkpoint, killing 3 members of the Syrian airforce's intelligence service.

On 12 April, the SOHR reported that a member of the Syrian army's 4th division was shot and killed by unknown gunmen in the town of Muzayrib in the western countryside of Daraa.

On 13 April, the SOHR reported the deaths of two Syrian militiamen after their car was targeted by an IED in Al-Qadisyah village in the western countryside of Al-Raqqah. On the same day, an ISIL cell assassinated a member of the Asayish security force in Al-Kebar village in the western countryside of Deir ez-zor.

On 14 April, the SOHR reported that two Syrian soldiers were killed after militants launched attacks on the Latakia area of the Idlib front.

On 16 April, two civilians were killed after they stepped on a mine left by ISIS northwest of Palmyra city.

On 17 April, an SDF vehicle was fired at by ISIL militants in the Diban area, killing an SDF commander and his escort. On the same day, an IED was activated against an SDF truck in the Basira area, killing 2 SDF fighters and wounding 5 others.

On 19 April 2021, Russian warplanes executed airstrikes on militant facilities and weapons in central Syria near the city of Palmyra according to the Russian Reconciliation Center for Syria. The Russian Defence Ministry claimed that some 200 militants along with 24 vehicles with weapons and 500 kilograms of ammunitions and explosives were destroyed in the operation. The SOHR confirmed the airstrikes but stated that only 26 ISIS militants were killed in the region.

On 20 April, clashes between the Syrian government's NDF militia and forces of the SDF broke out in the city of Al-Qamishli. The clashes continued into April 21. As of April 21, the SOHR have reported that 5 NDF militiamen and 1 Asayish commander have been killed in the clashes. An SDF intelligence operative was also shot dead by an IS cell in the Diban area. On the same day, ISIS also claimed responsibility for killing two Syrian soldiers in Ghadir al-Bustan, southern Syria.

On 21 April, 5 Syrian soldiers were killed and 3 others were wounded after Uzbek jihadists launched and infiltration operation against Syrian forces in the village of al-Ruwayha, in the southern Idlib countryside. 3 Uzbek jihadists were also killed in this operation. On the same day, an SDF patrol in Hazima, north of Al-Raqqah, was targeted by gunfire. An SDF fighter was killed and another was wounded. Later, an IED was activated against another SDF vehicle arriving on the scene. A sapper and two of his assistants were killed. Another assistant was wounded.

On 22 April, Israeli missiles were once again fired at Damascus, killing one Syrian army officer. Three other soldiers were also wounded by the attack. On the same day, according to SOHR, an ISIL cell attacked the SDF headquarters in Al-Busayrah city, killing one SDF member and wounding another. A Syrian Air Force intelligence lieutenant was shot dead in the city of Dael, Daraa. Two members of the Syrian 4th Division were also shot dead by gunmen on a motorcycle on the road between Al-Muzayrib and Tel-Shehab. A petrol station belonging to an SDF fighter was attacked in Markada, about 70 km northeast of Deir ez-Zo; two SDF fighters securing the station were killed.

On 24 April, ISIL operatives launched a surprise attack on the Syrian Army's 5th Corps in the Salamiyyah countryside, leaving 2 Syrian soldiers dead and 3 others wounded. The SOHR also reported that a Syrian Air-force intelligence member was killed and another was wounded after they were targeted by gunmen in the Al-Sahaw area of the eastern countryside of Daraa. On the same day, an Iranian oil tanker was attacked off the Syrian coast, it's unclear who launched the attack. According to Reuters, the vessel is said to have been one of the three Iranian oil tankers that recently arrived at the Syrian oil terminal. However, it was suspected that the drone originated from the direction of Lebanese waters, according to Al Jazeera.

On 25 April, the SOHR reported that a Syrian soldier was killed and two others were wounded after ISIS militants attacked a Syrian military post near Jabal Al-Bishri, southeast of Deir Ez-Zor.

On 26 April, ISIL claimed an attack on a tanker carrying water for the Syrian army east of Daraa. The driver was killed.

On 27 April, the SOHR reported the death of a rebel fighter and the deaths of 2 Syrian soldiers after the two sides exchanged sniper fire on the frontlines of Idlib. On the same day, ISIL attacked positions of the Syrian army in the Al-Mayadeen desert, killing at least 3 Syrian soldiers, according to the SOHR.

On 29 April, a Syrian Army commander was killed after exchanges of artillery fire and gunfire between SAA and rebel forces on the Idlib front.

== May ==
On 2 May, SOHR reported, ISIS militants killed 4 Syrian soldiers and injured 8 others after they launched an attack on Syrian positions in the eastern Homs desert.

On 3 May, ahead of Syria's presidential elections, the Supreme Constitutional Court of Syria approved three applications out of the 51 that were submitted. 48 other applications were turned down by the court, as they did not make the constitutional and legal prerequisite. On the same day, an SDF commander was shot dead by suspected ISIS militants east of Deir ez-zor.

On 4 May, Syrian government military officials met in Damascus with their counterparts from Saudi Arabia in a sign of thawing relations between the government and those other Arab states (see Foreign relations of Syria).

The same day, SOHR reported, two Syrian soldiers were killed and many others were injured, some seriously, after ISIS operatives ambushed a group of Syrian army vehicles as they left the al-Kamm oil station in the east Deir ez-Zor desert. The SOHR also reported the deaths of 2 Syrian soldiers after they were shot dead by gunmen in the town of Um Walad in the eastern countryside of Daraa. ISIL later claimed responsibility.

On 5 May, the Syrian state media announced that an Israeli attack was carried out in northwestern Syria's Latakia, which led to the death of one person. Apart from the civilian who was killed during the attack, which hit a civilian plastics factory, six others were also wounded, according to Reuters. Masyaf town in Hama province was also said to have been targeted in the attack, Deutsche Welle added. However, the Syrian aerial defenses managed to engage some of the missiles, as they intercepted them. No immediate comments were made by the Israel Defence Forces, in line with its policy of neither confirming nor denying its operation in Syria.

On 6 May, the SOHR reported that 3 members of the Palestinian Liwa al-Quds were killed and 12 others were injured by ISIS operatives after combing the al-Amour mountains searching for ISIS cells. The SOHR also reported that a Syrian soldier was shot dead by unknown gunmen in the Al-Suwaidaa.

On 7 May, SOHR reported, Syrian forces targeted, with two guided missiles, two vehicles, including a military vehicle belonging to HTS, on the outskirts of Atareb city in western Aleppo. The attack left two HTS members dead and two other members injured.

On 9 May, SOHR reported, a member of the Syrian Fourth Division was shot dead by unidentified gunmen, in the town of Tel Shehab, near the Syrian-Jordanian border, west of Daraa. Four members of the Kurdish self defense force were killed after ISIS opened fire on their bus whilst in transit in the village of Al-Kabar in the western countryside of Deir Ezzor. The SOHR also reported the death of a Syrian soldier after being shot by a sniper of opposition factions on the frontlines of Maarrat Mukhes in south Idlib. An officer of the rebel Al-Sham corps was also killed by Syrian bombardment on the Saraqib frontline.

Also on 9 May, firefighters managed to extinguish a major fire that erupted in western Syria's main Homs refinery. According to the state media, the fire was caused by a leak in a pumping station, no further details were provided. Meanwhile, just a few hours following the Homs oil refinery fire, a mysterious explosion was also said to have hit an oil tanker off the Syrian coast. There were no casualties reported, as the crew was able to put out the fire that erupted in one of the engines of the oil tanker.

On 10 May, the SOHR reported the deaths of at least 7 Syrian soldiers after two mines planted by ISIS exploded targeting a military force in Jabal al-Amour area, to the west of the Al-Sukhnah area in the eastern desert of Homs. Clashes between ISIS militants and Syrian forces were also reported in Bayoud in the countryside of al-Rahjan, Homs, leaving 4 Syrian soldiers and at least one ISIS militant dead. A civilian was also killed in the crossfire. An SDF soldier was killed after he was shot by suspected ISIS cells in al-Busaiteen, near the town of al-Suwar in the northern countryside of Deir Ezzor. Another SDF member was also shot dead by unknown gunmen in front of a barber shop in Ain Issa. The Turkish Ministry of Defense announced the death of one servicemen and the wounding of other four by result of rocket fire by unknown attackers on Idlib.

On 11 May, SOHR reported, at least six ISIS militants were killed by Russian airstrikes in the Deir ez Zor desert. Two members of the Liwa Al Quds militia were also killed and six others were wounded after ISIS attacked their checkpoint in the al Rusafa desert, west of Raqqa.

On 12 May, SOHR reported, ISIS militants stormed a house in the village of Al-Hussan, in the western countryside of Deir ez-Zor, and shot dead a man who IS accused of 'sorcery'.

On 14 May, SOHR reported, two Syrian soldiers were killed and four others were wounded after an ISIS landmine exploded in the southern desert of Deir ez-Zor province. On the same day, at least. 13 ISIS militants were killed by continuous Russian airstrikes in the Deir ez-Zor and Raqqa deserts.

On 15 May, SOHR reported, three government soldiers of the 112th Army Brigade were killed and two others were wounded after unknown gunmen targeted their vehicle in the town of Ain Zikr, Daraa province.

On 18 May, SOHR reported, an Iranian militia of the Syrian Army was attacked by ISIS south of al-Mateyah village in Maskanah desert, east of Aleppo. The attack left 8 militiamen dead including a militia leader. 4 SDF members were also wounded after an ISIS IED exploded in the city of Al-Busairah.

On 19 May, SOHR reported, ISIL operatives shot dead a member of Rojava's legislative council in the village of al-Jazarat, in the western countryside of Deir ez-Zor. A reconciled rebel who joined the Syrian Army's 4th Division was also shot dead by unidentified gunmen near the town of Tasil, western Daraa. Later that day, ISIS militants reportedly killed a commander of the SDF's 6th regiment, during an ambush in the village of al-Shuhayl.

On 22 May, the SOHR reported that two masked men on a motorcycle shot dead two SDF members and a civilian, at the outskirts of al-Busairah city's market. On the same day 3 Syrian militiamen were killed after on IED planted by ISIS exploded in the Ma’adan desert in al-Raqqah countryside. A Syrian soldier was also killed by unknown gunmen on the road between Deir al-Bakht village and al-Sanamain city, north of Daraa.

On 26 May, the 2021 Syrian presidential election took place. On the same day, the SOHR reported that 5 ISIL militants were killed by Russian airstrikes in the Raqqa desert.

On May 27, the SOHR reported that a Syrian soldier was shot dead by unknown gunmen in the al-Quneitra countryside.

On May 28, clashes between an ISIS cell and Turkish-backed militiamen took place in al-Bab city. According to the SOHR, three Turkish-backed militiamen and two ISIS operatives were killed.

On May 30, the SOHR reported that two suspected ISIL members, on a motorcycle, shot two Turkish-backed police officers in the city of Al-Bab. One officer was shot dead and the other later died of his wounds. The gunmen on the motorbike shouted 'ISIS revives, infidels' according to the SOHR. The SOHR also reported that on the same day, a member of the Liwaa al-Quds was killed and 3 others were injured by a landmine, planted by IS operatives in the Al-Mayadeen desert. A member of the Syrian 4th Division was also shot dead by gunmen in al-Yadoudah, western Daraa.

== June ==
On June 3, the SOHR reported that an NDF militiaman was killed and 4 others were wounded after landmine planted by IS militants exploded at the junction of Anad al-Tawm in the eastern countryside of Salamiyyah. A Turkish soldier was killed by YPG forces, after a rocket attack was launched against Turkish forces in the north-western Aleppo countryside.

On June 4, the SOHR reported that ISIS members attacked positions and posts of regime forces and their proxies in Faydat Ibn Muwani’ in al-Mayadeen desert, which left five Syrian soldiers and two ISIS members dead. The SOHR also reported on an ambush by ISIS members in al-Sukhnah desert in the eastern countryside of Homs, leaving five Syrian soldiers dead, including Nizar Abbas al-Fahoud, a Syrian major general. Three members of the IRGC: Hassan Abdullahzadeh and his companion Mohsen Abbasi, were also both killed by ISIS as was Brigadier General Sa'id Majidi. Three ISIS operatives were also killed in the ambush.

On June 5, the SOHR reported that 3 Syrian soldiers were blown up and killed by a landmine planted by ISIS in Wadi Abyad, in the Al-Sukhnah desert, east of Homs In the past 48 hours, 23 Syrian soldiers and two IRGC members were killed by ISIS during several operations throughout the Syrian desert.

On June 7, the SOHR reported that ISIS militants killed 3 Syrian Army officers after being ambushed in the desert of Tadmur in east countryside of Homos province. 5 ISIS militants were also killed during a security operation by the SDF in al-Hasakah city, according to the SOHR. This follows the arrest of an ISIS Emir a few days prior.

On June 8, 2 Syrian soldiers were killed and 13 others were wounded after a mine planted by ISIS, targeting a Syrian military convoy, exploded in Marigeeb al-Gomlan neighborhood in the countryside of Salmiyah city northwestern Hama province.

Also on 8 June, an Israeli missile allegedly targeted the Syrian capital of Damascus. The state news agency SANA reported that there were no casualties during the attack. The state news agency also maintained that the missile was intercepted, due to the activation of Syria's air defense system. According to the SOHR however, at least 11 pro-government fighters died during the attack. Many others were also injured, the Observatory added.

On June 9, a Russian soldier was killed and three others were wounded, after their car drove over a landmine in the village of Al-Asadiya, in the Al-Darbasiyah district in the Al-Hasaka countryside

On June 10, 13 people, including 4 civilians and 9 HTS militants, were killed by Syrian Army bombardment on Iblin in Jabal al-Zawiyah. The spokesperson of the military wing of HTS, Abu Khaled al-Shamy and the media coordinator in the HTS military media department, Abu Mosa’ab were both killed in the bombardments according to the SOHR. The incident was described by the SOHR as the deadliest violations of the 15-month-old ceasefire deal, which began with a rocket launch close to the village of Iblin, 15 miles southwest of Syria's Idlib. The SOHR also reported that two Syrian Army officers were killed by a landmine planted by ISIS, during combing operations in the South Raqqa desert.

On June 11, ISIS attacked a convoy of the Syrian 25th Special Mission Forces Division on the Kanaser road in the southeast of the Aleppo countryside. The attack left two soldiers of the 25th Division dead and 13 others wounded.

On June 12, at least 18 civilians were killed and 23 were injured after missiles hit the Al Shifa hospital in the Afrin, held by Turkish-backed militants. Initially the Kurdish SDF were blamed, even though they denied the attack. Later reports claim the missiles came from the Tell Rifaat area, which is controlled by the Assad Government. In retaliation, Turkish forces used T-155 Fırtına to hit YPG/PKK targets in Tell Rifaat on 13 June.

On June 16, according to the SOHR, two government soldiers were killed and two others were wounded after they stepped on a landmine near Deir Adas town in northern Daraa.

On June 17, two members of the Syrian NDF militia were killed by a suspected ISIS landmine in the Al-Mayadeen desert during combing operations, according to the SOHR. On the same day, the SOHR reported that a field commander and two other members of the Syrian 5th Corps were found dead in the east Raqqa desert after being executed by ISIS cells.

On June 18, 2 Iranian-backed militiamen were killed and 8 others were wounded after ISIS attacked their guard post in the Juwaif area, in al-Mayadeen desert.

On June 20, the SOHR reported that 2 SDF-backed militiamen were killed by an ISIS landmine in the in al-Shula neighborhood southern Deir Ezzor province.

On June 21, according to the SOHR an 'insane man' was shot dead by Syrian soldiers near a checkpoint in eastern Daraa.

On June 22, the SOHR reported the deaths of two Syrian soldiers and the injury of 9 others after ISIS ambushed them in Wadi al-Abyad "the White Valley" in Palmyra desert in Homs governorate.

On June 24, 4 Syrian National Army soldiers were killed after clashes erupted at the line of contact near the Sajur River, due to an infiltration attempt by YPG forces. On the same day, the SOHR documented the deaths of 4 NDF militiamen and the wounding of 6 others after an ISIS landmine exploded under their bus in the Solmiyah desert in the eastern Hama countryside.

On June 25, Sheikh Jawdat, the "Emir of Economics" of the Turkistan Islamic Party was killed by an IED blast in the border city of Salqeen in Idlib. On the same day, the SOHR reported the deaths of 5 Kurdish self-defense force members and the injury of 5 others, after their bus was ambushed by ISIL militants in the town of Jazarat al-Milaj in the western countryside of Deir Ezzor.

On June 26, 3 civilians were killed after a roadside bomb exploded in Afrin. Turkey blamed the YPG/PKK for the bombing. A member of the Manbij Military Council died from wounds he sustained after participating in a skirmish wish SNA forces on the al-Bab frontline.

U.S. precision airstrikes targeting Iran-backed militants in As Sikak, Syria, 27 June 2021

On June 27, an Asayish member was assassinated in his house by an ISIS cell in the village of al-Hissan.

Also on June 27, the U.S. carried out airstrikes targeting Iran-backed militia groups close to the Syria-Iraq border. The F-15 and F-16 aircraft were used to launch the attack in what the US described as a retaliatory attack against US facilities and personnel in Iraq by militia groups. Two operational and weapons storage facilities were targeted in Syria, the US military revealed in a statement. According to Xinhuanet, one child was killed, with three other civilians injured in Deir al-Zour province of eastern Syria. Despite the US not disclosing the information regarding the casualties in the attack, the SOHR stated that at least five Iran-backed Iraqi militia fighters died, leaving many others injured.

On 28 June, the U.S. forces in Syria reportedly came under fire, following the US strikes on the Syria-Iraqi border over the weekend. According to the SOHR, several shells were fired against the US base in eastern Syria's Al-Omar oil field, by Iran-backed militia groups. The US coalition responded by firing heavy artillery, the war monitor added. There no injuries sustained during the attack, the spokesman for Operation Inherent Resolve, Col. Wayne Marotto disclosed. Also, no immediate claims of responsibility has been made yet, during the attack on the US troops in eastern Syria.

== July ==
On July 3, at least 8 civilians were killed and several others were wounded after the Syrian army heavily shelled several areas in Jabal al-Zawiyah in the southern Idlib countryside. According to Al Jazeera, out of the 8 civilians who were killed, 6 of them were believed to be children. The incident was described by the regional director of UNICEF as the worst since the cease-fire agreement, which was reached in March 2020. Following the shelling by the Russian-backed Syrian government forces, airstrikes by alleged Russian warplanes were also said to have targeted areas in the western part of Idlib, the SOHR stated.

On 4 July, the SOHR reported that a member of the Syrian Army's 5th Corps was shot dead, and another was wounded, by unknown gunmen in Ankhel city, Daraa. The SOHR also reported that an ISIS cell assassinated a member of the Autonomous Defense forces near al-Qasrah village in the southern countryside of al-Raqqa province.

On 5 July, the SOHR reported that Turkish forces shell al-Sajour frontlines, while clashes erupt between Turkish-backed factions and Kurdish forces in north Aleppo.

On 6 July, ISIS claimed responsibility for killing a civilian near Al-Riz village, east of Deir Ez Zour, after kidnapping him under charges of working with the SDF. An SDF soldier also died of his wounds after Turkish artillery shelled SDF positions in al-Sadd village, in the Aleppo countryside. On the same day, the SOHR also reported that a Syrian soldier was killed by an opposition sniper on the Kabana front in Latakia province. Later in the day, 2 Syrian soldiers were killed and 8 others were wounded after their bus drove over an ISIS landmine on a road north of Sokhna in the countryside of Homs.

On 7 July, eight government soldiers were killed and two more were captured (including an officer) after ISIS attacked their positions northwest of Al-Tuwainat near the Ithriya-Al-Rusafa road, during combing operations. On the same day, at least four government soldiers (including a first lieutenant) were killed by an IED explosion near Nafaa village in the western countryside of Daraa. On the same day, the SOHR reported the Turkish military confirmed that a Turkish soldier was killed and 3 others were wounded after their vehicle crashed, after coming under fire from unknown gunmen, near the Syrian-Turkish border.

On 9 July, an officer of the IRGC was killed by an ISIS landmine in the eastern countryside of Homs.

On 10 July, ISIL released footage of them executing an SDF 'spy' that they abducted in Al-Jurdi al-Gharbi, near Al-Mayadeen.

On 11 July, the Syrian government announced that new prices of bread and fuel had come into action, hiking the prices by at least double, in the war-torn country. The steep prices came just as Syrian President Bashar al-Assad ordered a decree, increasing the salaries for public sectors by 50 percent. In addition to the increase in salaries for the public sectors, pensions were also increased by 40 percent, including the military.

On 12 July, 4 members of the IRGC were killed after their convoy was targeted by two ISIS IED's in the eastern countryside of Homs. On the same day, the SOHR reported that a field commander of Liwa al-Quds militia was killed and three others were wounded after they stepped on an ISIS landmine near Palmyra, in the eastern Homs desert.

On 13 July, the SOHR reported that 5 Syrian soldiers were killed and 8 others were wounded after ISIS attacked SAA positions in the al-Rasafa desert in al-Raqqah countryside. On the same day, 3 members of the Liwa Fatemiyoun militia were killed after an IED exploded in their car near Al-Mayadin city, in the eastern countryside of Deir ez-Zour. ISIS cells are suspected of carrying out the attack.

On 14 July, the SDF launched an infiltration attempt in al-Tirwaziya village in northern al-Raqqah city, killing one member of Ahrar al-Sharqiya and the wounding of 4 others.

On 15 July, the SOHR reported that 2 members of the Syrian National Army were killed and 5 others were injured after fighters of the Manbij military council launched an infiltration operation near al-Ghandourah in the Manbij countryside. On the same day, at least 8 civilians were killed in the Masbah area, near Iblin in Idlib province, after the Syrian army launched several rocket attacks in the area.

On 16 July, the SOHR reported that SDF operatives killed an ISIS militant and his son whilst trying to arrest them in Theban town in the eastern countryside of Deir Ezzor.

On 17 July, 6 civilians were killed after Syrian artillery targeted village of Sarja in Jabal al-Zawiya, in Idlib, according to the SOHR.

On 18 July, 4 Syrian soldiers were killed, including a 2nd Lieutenant, after clashing with ISIS cells during combing operations in the Palmyra desert.

On 19 July, 5 Syrian soldiers, including 4 members of the Republican Guard, were killed during clashes on the Idlib frontline. 2 members of the Syrian Opposition were also killed in during the clashes.

On 20 July, Israeli warplanes carried out airstrikes in Jabl al-Waha area in al-Sferah neighborhood in southeast Aleppo, killing at least five Iranian-backed militiamen, two of which were members of Hezbollah. The SOHR also reported that an SDF member was assassinated by an ISIS cell in Abu Hamam town in the eastern countryside of Deir Ezzor. On the same day, four members of the Turkistan Islamic Party launched a suicidal raid on Syrian army positions in the village of Mizanaz, in the Aleppo countryside. The attack left all 4 of the Turkistan fighters and 5 Syrian soldiers dead.

On 21 July, coalition jets launched airstrikes in Kherbat Jamous village in east al-Hasakah countryside near Jabal Kawkab. They targeted a house, killing 3 suspected ISIS militants who refused to surrender to SDF forces.

On 22 July, a Syrian army lieutenant was assassinated by an ISIS cell in the al-Mosareb desert in the Deir Ezzor countryside. Also, seven members of the same family were killed in an artillery shelling by the Syrian government forces in the village of Ibleen in southern Idlib province. Four children were among those who were killed, according to rescue workers and a war monitor.

On 23 July, the SOHR reported that a member of the Al-Bab Military Council was killed and 3 others were wounded after Turkish forces bombarded areas on the Al-Bab frontline.

On 24 July, three Turkish soldiers were killed and two more were wounded after SDF operatives fired an ATGM at a Turkish armoured vehicle in the town of Hazwan, in the eastern countryside of Aleppo. In response, the Turkish army launched numerous artillery attacks targeting SDF positions on the Manbij and Al-Bab fronts, killing one Kurdish fighter and wounding another.

On 27 July, ISIS attacked multiple Syrian army positions south of Raqqa leaving 7 Syrian soldiers and 5 ISIS militants dead.

29 July: 2021 Daraa clashes

On 30 July, the SOHR reported that 2 members of the Al-Bab Military Council were killed after Turkish forces launched a rocket attack on the al-A’rimah frontline in the Aleppo countryside.

== August ==
On August 4, one Syrian soldier was killed and three more were injured after their bus drove over a landmine in the Syrian capital of Damascus. On the same day, the SOHR reported that Al-Safawiyah village in Ain Essa countryside in north al-Raqqa, was targeted by Turkish proxy rocket fire, killing 4 civilians.

On August 5, the SOHR reported that two members of HTS were killed by Syrian army snipers on the al-Futirah frontlines in Jabal al-Zawiyah in southern Idlib. Also on August 5, the SOHR reported that 2 civilians were killed and 2 others were wounded after SDF forces fired rockets at Hazawan village in the eastern countryside of Aleppo.

On August 6, the SOHR reported that a group of Uzbek Jihadists launched an infiltration operation at dawn on the Hantoutin axis in Idlib countryside, killing at least 6 Syrian soldiers and wounding several others. 4 Uzbek Jihadists were also killed in the operation. Later in the day, a rebel sniper shot dead a Syrian soldier on the Kafr Mous village's frontline in Shashabo mountain area, south of Idlib.

On August 7, the SOHR reported that a Syrian army-backed militiaman was killed in an ambush by ISIL cells on the Deir ez-zour-Palmyra road.

Separately, four children from the same family were reportedly killed after regime shelling hit a village in northwest Syria. According to the SOHR, five other members of the same family were also wounded. In Zayadiya village, the regime forces also carried out an attack, which left two people wounded, according to the Syrian Civil Defense known as The White Helmets.

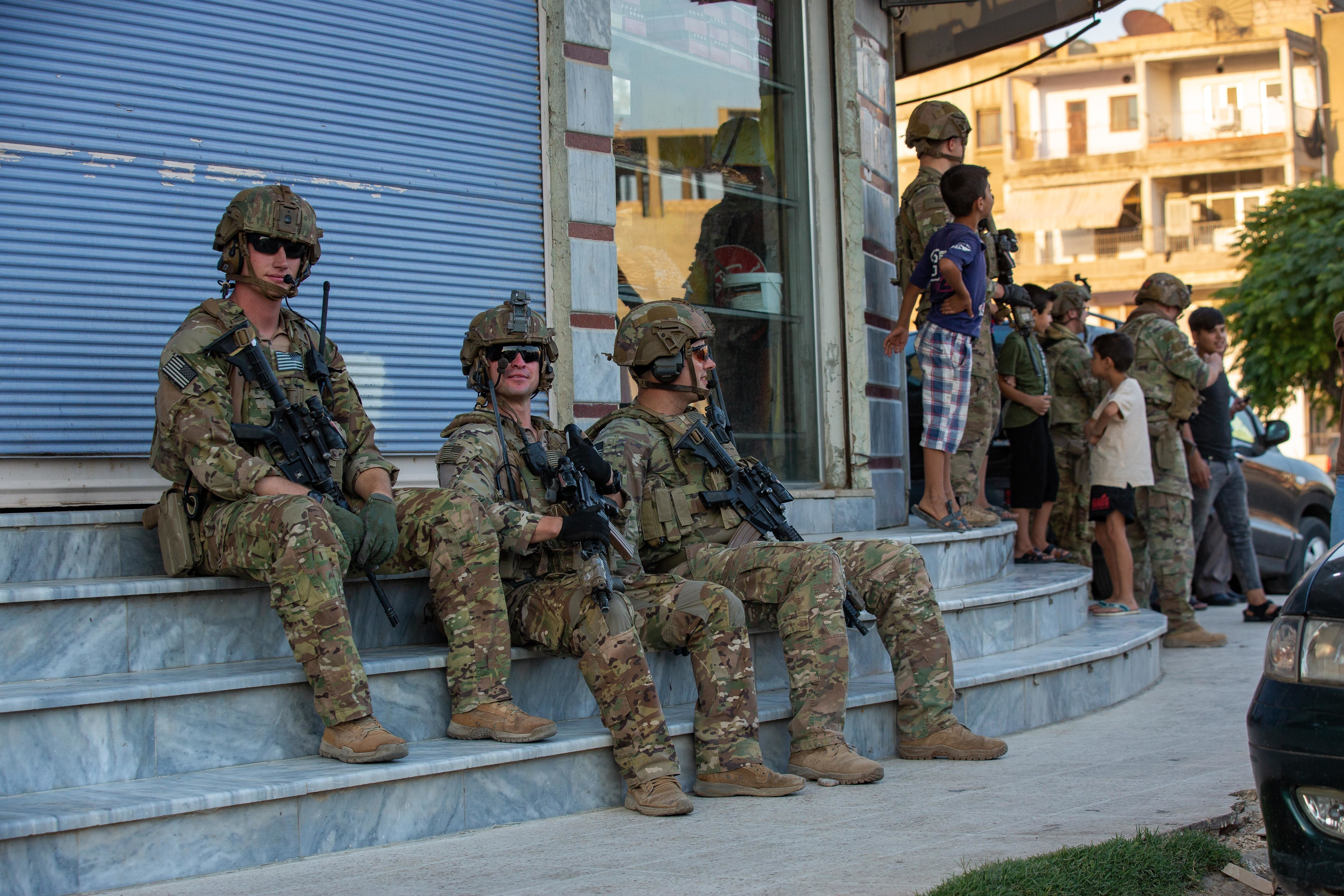
U.S. soldiers of 173rd Infantry Battalion, Task Force Warclub, 256th Infantry Brigade Combat Team in a Syrian town, 9 August 2021

On August 11, one of Hayat Tahrir al-Sham's (HTS) most experienced snipers, Hassan Khalid Rahal, was killed by Syrian Army snipers in the Zawiya mountain area. On the same day, the SOHR reported that a member of the Syrian security services and politician was found dead in a field after being kidnapped by unknown militants near Telbiseh city.

On August 12, the SOHR reported that two Iranian-backed militiamen were killed by an ISIL landmine near Jabal al-Beshri in east al-Raqqah desert. ISIL forces also attacked positions of the NDF militia, leaving casualties.

On 15 August, the SOHR reported that a member of the Turkish-backed SNA was shot dead by SDF snipers in the 'peace spring' operation area.

On 16 August, the SOHR reported that an ex-ISIS fighter who joined the SDF was shot dead by unknown gunmen in al-Jazara, in the western countryside of Deir ez-zor.

On 18 August, the SOHR reported that an officer of the Syrian Army's 11th division was killed and 5 other soldiers were wounded after ISIL operatives attacked their positions in the al-Shoula desert in south Deir Ezzor countryside. Suspected ISIL militants also launched a mortar attack on Iraqi Hezbollah forces in Jabal al-Boshra, killing one Hezbollah member and wounding another. At least 20 Russian airstrikes were carried out in the Syrian desert in response to these attacks.

On 19 August, 5 people were killed in a shelling by the Syrian government forces in northwest Syria. Most of those who were killed are believed to be children, according to opposition activists. On the same day, a Turkish drone targeted SDF personnel in Tell Tamer, killing 9 people including a high ranking SDF officer. The Tal Tamir military council announced they wouldn't sit idly in response to the attack. The SOHR also reported that 2 Kurdish members of the SDF were killed by Turkish-backed forces during a clash in al-Kuridiya village east of al-Bab. In response to these attacks, the SDF conducted 3 separate operations in the Ras al-Ayn area, killing a Turkish soldier and 6 Turkish-backed militiamen.

Separately, the Syrian air defenses managed to intercept Israeli missiles that targeted Damascus on Thursday, the state news agency SANA revealed. Prior to the attack, the Lebanese media outlets had reported low-flying Israeli jets above the capital Beirut. No immediate casualties were recorded during the attack, The Times of Israel added.

On 20 August, Syrian government forces carried out an attack on the rebel stronghold in Kansfara village, south of Idlib, killing four children. Within just two days, the number of children killed in Idlib during the regime shelling had reached 8, alongside a woman, according to a war monitor. The woman was believed to be a mother of three, whereas four children were from the same family.

On August 21, the SOHR reported that a member of Asayish was assassinated in his house in Jazarat al-Bo Shams in the western countryside of Deir Ez zor by unknown gunmen. On the same day an Iranian commander of the YPG died of wounds he sustained on August 19 in a Turkish drone attack on his military vehicle near al-Qamishli.

On August 22, the SOHR reported that a member of Turkish-backed Maghawir al-Shamal branch of the SNA was killed in Kafr Khasher to the south of Azaz city after SDF forces targeted the area with an air guided missile.

On August 23, the SOHR reported that a Syrian soldier was killed and at least 20 others were injured after a Turkish artillery attack on Syrian Army posts in the Tel Tamr countryside.

On August 24, two Syrian soldiers were killed after opposition forces launched a sniping operation on the al-Malaja frontline in Idlib. On the same day, the SOHR reported that 8 members of HTS were killed after an explosion took place in one of their training camps in Idlib. Reports say the cause of the explosion was either a drone attack or an unknown explosion within the camp. Residents and opposition sources maintained that a dozen other recruits were also wounded in the explosion, Reuters added. However, two opposition military sources claimed that the explosion took place as HTS fighters were training close to the Syrian town of Hizano.

On August 28, 3 NDF militiamen were killed by an ISIS landmine in al-Duwayr village in the eastern countryside of Deir Ezzor.

On August 29, the SOHR reported that 3 SDF fighters were killed and one ISIL militant was injured after an IS cell attacked their vehicle near Jadeed Okidat town in east Deir Ezzor countryside.

On the same day, the Syrian military reportedly launched an attack on Daraa, killing at least six people.

On August 30, the SOHR reported that the Russian air force launched several airstrikes targeting ISIS positions in the eastern Syrian desert. A Syrian soldier was also killed in clashes with ISIL cells in South Deir ez-Zor. Meanwhile, at least one person was killed during the Syrian government shelling in the southern city of Deraa.

On 31 August, testimonies from military sources and witnesses suggested that several improvised missiles targeted the southwestern city of Deraa. On the same day, the SOHR reported that 3 rebels were killed in a landmine explosion in south-east Kasanfara in the Idlib countryside.

== September ==
On September 1, following days of intense shelling by the Syrian regime forces in the last rebel enclave in the southern city of Deraa, a ceasefire deal was said to have been reached between the two parties. As the agreement was reached, the Russian military police were also deployed in the city, according to the Arab News. According to the ceasefire deal, none of the residents would be ejected from the area, while the pro-government forces, including its military security branch, would be based at four places in the region.

On September 3, the SANA state news stated that early on Friday, Syrian air defenses managed to shoot down Israeli missiles that were fired over the Syrian capital Damascus. The missiles were reportedly launched from the southeast area of Lebanon. The SOHR also confirmed the attack, maintaining that it was aimed at sites used by pro-Iranian militias to build weapons in Jamraya and Barzeh areas close to Damascus.

On September 4, the SOHR reported that at least nine ISIS members were killed by at least 100 Russian airstrikes conducted in the Syrian desert in the past 48 hours. On the same day, a member of the Republican Guard was killed by an ISIS landmine near al-Fahdah oil field in the south-western al-Raqqah.

On September 5, at least thre3 civilians were killed after a car bomb was detonated in the city of Afrin, northwestern Syria. On the same day, the SOHR reported that two members of the Syrian Army's intelligence service had been assassinated in Da’el city, Daraa province.

On September 7, the SOHR reported that 6 Syrian soldiers were killed and 8 more were wounded in clashes with ISIS in the al-Soukhna desert in east Homs countryside. On the same day, the SOHR reported that a Turkish soldier was killed and 4 others were wounded during a Kurdish rocket attack on their base in al-Yashily villages in al-Bab countryside. The SOHR also reported that at least 3 civilians after the Syrian army shelled areas of Idlib city. Opposition forces responded by targeting the city of Saraqib with heavy artillery.

On September 8, the SOHR reported that 3 Turkish-backed militiamen were killed in clashes with Kurdish forces on Maryameen frontline of Afrin.

On September 9, the SOHR reported that a commander of the pro-Assad NDF militia was killed and another was injured by an IED blast near the town of Maskanah. On the same day, a further 3 Turkish-backed militants were killed during clashes with SDF forces east of al-Bab city. Turkish and allied forces responded with artillery bombardment. Also, a Russian soldier was killed by an IED blast whilst on patrol in Homs province. He was taken to hospital after the blast, however he later died of his wounds.

On September 11, three Turkish non-commissioned officers were killed and four other soldiers were wounded after a roadside bomb exploded between Idlib city and Binnish. The SOHR said that the militant group responsible of the attack was led by Abu Bakr al-Siddiq.

Meanwhile, Turkey's Defense Minister Hulusi Akar during a meeting at the Turkish-Syrian border said that since the beginning of 2021, the Turkish security forces have neutralized 1,926 terrorists in northern Iraq and Syria. The terrorists were killed during domestic and cross-border operations in the regions, the minister added.

On September 13, the SOHR reported that 3 members of the Al-Hamza Division, including a commander, were killed after an IED exploded in the Raju district, in the Afrin countryside.

Also on September 13, Syrian President Bashar al-Assad met with his Russian ally Vladimir Putin in Russia. During the meeting, Putin criticized the foreign forces present in Syria without permission or approval by the UN. Meanwhile, Assad commended Russia for its efforts in protecting Syria's sovereignty, and also discussed the Syrian peace talks in Kazakhstan.

On September 14, 3 members of the YPG were killed and 4 more were wounded after a Turkish drone targeted Kurdish positions with airstrikes near Ayn Issa, northern Raqqa province.

On September 15, Russian Aerospace Forces attacked Idlib region.15 air strikes were launched. According to the opposition, three warplanes were used.

On September 17, the SOHR confirmed that six ISIS militants were killed in several Russian airstrikes in the Syrian desert.

On September 18, the SOHR reported that two Syrian soldiers were killed and seven more were injured, some seriously, after ISIS militants attacked elements of the Syrian Army in the al-Sukhnah desert, Homs province.

On September 19, five Liwa al-Quds militiamen were killed after ISIS operatives launched an attack on their positions in Jabal al-Ammour in Palmyra. Turkish forces killed one Syrian soldier in Afrin.

On September 20, at least two senior commanders of Al-Qaeda linked Hurras al-Din were killed in an American airstrike in near the town of Binnish, Idlib province.

On September 21, the SOHR reported that a Liwa al-Quds militiaman was killed after he stepped on an ISIL landmine during combing operations in the al-Sukhnah desert. At the same day Turkish Airstrikes on the Kurds starts to escalate.

On September 22, the SOHR reported that a former member of the Deir ez-Zor military council died of wounds he sustained after he was shot by ISIS assassins in al-Busayra city.

On September 23, three NDF militiamen, including a commander, were killed and 6 others were wounded during combing operations, after a landmine planted by ISIS cells exploded in the al-Sukhnah desert. On the same day, the SOHR reported that ISIS cells assassinated a former member of the SDF in al-Busayra city in Deir ez-Zor province.

On September 24, the SOHR reported that a soldier of the Syrian 25th Division was killed on the Idlib frontline, amid several Russian airstrikes on targets within the Idlib and Aleppo countryside. Another soldier with the rank of lieutenant later died of his wounds.

On September 25, an Albanian fighter of the Turkistan Islamic Party and a member of HTS were killed during a series of Russian airstrikes near Kabana, Latakia province.

On September 26, 11 members of the Turkish-backed al-Hamza Division were killed and 13 more were wounded after several Russian airstrikes targeted their positions in the village of Barad, in the Afrin countryside. On the same day, 3 ISIS operatives were killed during a firefight with forces of the International Coalition, in al-Shaheel, in east Deir Ezzor countryside.

Also, the SOHR reported that two Syrian soldiers were killed after ISIL operatives detonated an IED, targeting their convoy on the Deir ez-Zoir-Raqqa highway in the Syrian desert. In response, Russian warplanes launched at least 10 airstrikes on IS positions in the Syrian desert. Later, it was reported that 6 members of the Pro-Assad Liwa al-Quds militia were killed in a string of recent ISIS attacks in the Homs desert.

Furthermore, in response to the recent Russian attacks on their positions, Turkish-backed forces began to target SDF and Syrian army positions in the Aleppo countryside, killing two Syrian soldiers and injuring another. The SOHR also reported that the Syrian army had begun to shell TFSA positions in the 'Operation Peace Spring' area in the Tel Tamr countryside, after TFSA forces opened fire on a Russian helicopter.

On September 28, Turkish forces killed Engin Karaaslan, a central committee member of the PKK, after they conducted an operation in the vicinity of Qamishli.

On September 29, the SOHR reported that a Syrian soldier with the rank of lieutenant was killed in clashes with opposition forces in the western countryside of Aleppo. On the same day, a local leader of the 4th Division was shot dead by gunmen in Taseel town, west of Daraa.

On September 30, the SOHR reported that Syrian forces killed an Opposition fighter on the frontline of Tel’ada in the western countryside of Aleppo. On the same day, a local leader of the Syrian 4th Division was shot dead by gunmen in Taseel town, west of Daraa.

== October ==
On October 2, the SOHR reported that 6 members of the Syrian 4th Division were killed, including a Brigadier General, and 11 others were injured after Islamic State forces ambushed them in the al-Bal’aas area in Hama desert.

On October 3, a member of the Turkistan Islamic Party was killed and 4 others were wounded after an explosion occurred in the city of Idlib. On the same day, at least 4 members of HTS were killed after a suicide drone attack on their positions on the al-Ruwayha frontline of Idlib.

On October 6, five members of the Iranian-backed Liwa Fatemiyoun were killed and 10 more were wounded in a suspected ISIS attack whilst combing for ISIS cells in the Al-Biyarat area of the Homs governorate. An armoured vehicle was also blown up after militants launched a guided missile attack. On the same day, two Syrian Army lieutenants were killed by unknown gunmen in Daraa province. Furthermore, the SOHR reported that a member of the Turkish-backed opposition was killed after SDF forces opened fire on their positions on the frontlines of al-Sharkirak village in north al-Raqqah. Opposition factions responded by shelling SDF positions in the villages of al-Dardara and Tel Shinan in Tel Tamr countryside.

On October 7, a Turkish soldier was killed by SDF forces after they targeted the Turkish al-Twees base in the northern Aleppo countryside. Turkish and Turkish backed opposition fighters returned fire with artillery targeting SDF positions in the villages of Sadd al-Shahbaa and al-Souqiyyah. The Turkish ministry of defence claimed to have killed 5 SDF fighters in response. On the same day, the SOHR reported that a member of Hayat Tahrir al-Sham (HTS) was killed and 7 others injured in a Russian airstrike on one of the group's headquarters in Basenqoul village in the western countryside of Idlib.

On October 8, the SOHR reported that in the past week, at least 17 ISIS members had been killed in Russian airstrikes in the Syrian desert, mostly in areas in the Aleppo-Hama-al-Raqqah triangle and Palmyra desert.

On October 9, the SOHR reported that 2 foreign fighters fighting for the Assad regime, were killed after Israeli airstrikes hit the 'T4 airbase' in the eastern countryside of Homs. The Syrian-state ran SANA News reported that the attack injured 6 Syrian soldiers.

On October 10, 2 Turkish soldiers were killed and 2 Turkish-backed militiamen were injured after SDF/YPG forces targeted a Turkish armoured vehicle in Azaz. On the same day, the SOHR reported that two ISIS militants were killed after SDF forces foiled an attempt by IS forces to launch an ambush against them in al-Tokiyhay town in east Deir Ezzor.

On October 11, at least 6 people were killed including a member of a Turkish-backed militia after a car bomb exploded in the city of Afrin

On October 13, the SOHR reported that 2 members of Suqour al-Sham were killed after a landmine explosion in Binin village in south Idlib countryside. On the same day, Israeli airstrikes killed at least one Syrian soldier and wounded 3 others after they targeted the T-4 airbase near the city of Palmyra.

On October 14, an unidentified drone attacked positions of the SDF, while Syrian Armed Forces shelled a Turkish military post in Idlib.

On October 15, at least 8 Syrian soldiers were killed after ISIS attacked Syrian army posts in the al-Rasafah area of the Syrian desert. On the same day, two Turkish soldiers were killed by an IED explosion targeted their armoured vehicle on road between Kefraya-Maarat Misrin, north of Idlib. The 'Abu Bakar al-Siddiq Brigade' claimed responsibility for the attack.

On October 16, per SOHR, a member of the Syrian Army's 5th Corps was killed and another was injured after unknown gunmen opened fire on their positions in Sayda town in the eastern countryside of Daraa.

On October 17, the SOHR reported that an ISIS militant was killed by SDF forces during a security operation in al-Zarr village in the eastern countryside of Deir Ezzor. The SOHR also reported that at least 14 ISIS operatives were killed by around 55 Russian airstrikes in the al-Rasafah desert, conducted in the previous 48 hours.

On October 20, 14 Syrian military personnel were killed and 3 others were wounded after two roadside bombs exploded as a Syrian military bus was passing president bridge, Damascus. On the same day, 13 people were killed Syrian artillery bombardment on Ariha in Idlib province. A Syrian army ammo depot also exploded near Hama, killing 6 Syrian military personnel and wounding 3 other. 2 people were also killed in a Turkish drone attack in the city of Kobani.

Also on October 20, 24 people were executed by the Syrian state for starting wildfires in the Latakia Governorate.

On October 22, a U.S drone strike killed Abdul Hamid al-Matar, a senior Al-Qaeda leader in northern Syria.

On October 23, two Syrian militiamen were killed in the Syrian desert, allegedly due to a friendly fire incident whilst fighting ISIS cells in Jabal al-Bishri in Deir Ezzor countryside. Meanwhile, Russian warplanes targeted ISIS positions in the al-Rasafa desert. On the same day, 3 civilians were killed in a Turkish drone strike on a car in Kobani, northern Syria.

On October 24, Russian jets executed three airstrikes on the western countryside of Idlib, targeting the vicinity of the sugar factory in Jisr al-Shughour and the outskirts of al-Kafeer village in the southern countryside of Idlib.

On October 25, a drone strike near Ras al-Ayn killed Sabahi Al Ibrahim Al Muslehin, a man wanted by Coalition forces for his links to ISIL. On the same day, Syrian forces and it proxies on one side and the rebel military factions on the other at the frontlines of Fulifil, al-Futirah and Banein in south Idlib countryside clashed with heavy and medium machine guns

Later that day, clashes between Hayat Tahrir al-Sham and 'Jund al-Islam' in Jisr al-Shughur left 7 members of 'Jund al-Islam' and 4 members of HTS dead.

On 26 October, the Turkish Parliament voted in favour of extending Turkey's military mandate to conduct military operations in Syria and Iraq by a further two years. This vote comes during a period of high tensions between Turkey and the Kurdish Rojava.

On 28 October, the SOHR reported that an Imam who was a former member of the Muslim Brotherhood was shot dead by suspected ISIS militants in al-Zarr village, after he spoke out against ISIS.

On 29 October, Mustafa al-Sicri of the Syrian Liberation Front announced that their forces were ready to "continue operations against terrorist organisations" and "we are waiting for the start of the operation". It is worth noting that Turkey and its proxy forces view the SDF and their affiliates as 'terrorists'. On the same day, the SOHR reported that a member of Hayat Tahrir al-Sham was killed by a landmine explosion in al-Bara, southern Idlib, bringing the total opposition forces killed by landmines since the start of October to 7.

On 30 October, the SOHR reported that over the course of the month of October, 31 ISIS militants had been killed in Russian airstrikes in the Syrian desert and over 50 others were wounded. On the same day, a Syrian soldier was killed and a child was injured by opposition rocket fire on the Jurin area, in the Hama countryside. Furthermore, a Syrian soldier, who worked at a military radar station near al-Na’imah town, was killed after being shot dead by unknown gunmen. A 'collaborator' of Syrian security forces was also shot dead by unknown gunmen on the outskirts of al-Shajarah.

On 31 October, a source from the Syrian government claimed that there is a chance Turkey and their proxy forces could launch a military operation within the 'next few hours' as of late 31 October. Later that day, a Turkish soldier died of wounds he sustained on from an IED in Idlib on October 15. Bringing the total number of Turkish soldiers killed since early 2021 to 27.

== November ==
On 1 November, two Syrian soldiers were killed by opposition snipers in Ma’arah Mokhis in Idlib countryside and Basratoon in Aleppo countryside, following a series of clashes and bombardments. On the same day, 3 members of the HTS backed 'Othman Ibn Affan' brigade were killed after trying to dismantle a unexploded bomb near the frontline Kabana in the northern countryside of Latakia.

On 2 November, the SOHR reported that a member of the Syrian army's 4th division was shot dead by unknown gunmen in the western countryside of Daraa.

On 3 November, the SOHR reported that three government soldiers were shot dead by opposition forces on frontlines of Heir Dirkel village and al-Shaikh Akeel countryside western of Aleppo. On the same day, a prominent recruiter of HTS was killed after he was shot dead in his house in Idlib city.

On 5 November, according to SOHR, the body of an SDF fighter was found dead in the city of Raqqa, showing signs of torture.

On 7 November, five government soldiers were killed in a series of separate attacks by insurgent gunmen in the province of Daraa, according to SOHR. On the same day, an ISIS member was blown up in the city of Jarabulus by a suspected Coalition airstrike.

On 8 November, 5 Hezbollah members were killed in an ISIS attack in the Mahin area in the Homs Governorate. On the same day, the SOHR reported that a man was killed during a Coalition operation in al-Sobha village in east Deir Ezzor village and the relatives of the deceased man were arrested and charged with dealing with ISIS. A man was also killed by IS militants in Fanigol village in the Abu Khashab desert in west Deir Ezzor. On the same day, an IED was activated targeting a Syrian army vehicle near the town of Izra, Daraa. The explosion killed 4 Syrian soldiers. ISIS later claimed responsibility.

On 9 November, a reconciled rebel who had been working with Syrian Military Intelligence was shot dead by unknown gunmen in Al-Sanamayn city, Daraa.

On 10 November, at least 7 Iranian-backed militiamen were killed in a drone strike on a weapons warehouse in al-Bokamal City in east Deir Ezzor countryside. On the same day, a Syrian soldier was shot dead by opposition forces in Saraqib, following several instances of shelling between the two combatants.

Furthermore, two Asayish members were killed in an ISIS IED attack in the former IS-held town of Hajin.

On 11 November, 5 civilians were killed in a Russian airstrike on the village of Broma in the north Idlib countryside. On the same day, Russian forces conducted over 40 airstrikes on Islamic State positions in the Palmyra desert.

On 12 November, an Iranian jihadist was reportedly gunned down by unknown assailants in the centre of Idlib city following Friday prayers.

On 13 November, Turkish border guards killed two civilians as they were attempting to cross to Iskenderun region near Harem city in the northern countryside of Idlib on the Syria-Turkey border. On the same day, a member of the Ba'ath Party, two members of military security and a child were killed in an attack by unknown gunmen in Al-Sanamayn city, Daraa.

On 14 November, 13 pro-government militiamen were killed and several others were wounded after forces of the Islamic State ambushed their combing patrol near a salt mine in the al-Masrab desert in the western countryside of Deir Ezzor. Heavy gunfire could be heard from Raqqa city just after the arrival of the bodies of 7 of the 13 fatalities.

On 15 November, SAA Brigadier Liwaa Sharaf and four other government soldiers were killed by Islamic State cells after an IED targeted their vehicle in the western Deir Ezzor desert. On the same day, 3 opposition fighters were killed by unknown gunmen Darat Izza in the western countryside of Aleppo.

On 17 November, a first lieutenant of the Syrian army was shot dead by unknown gunmen on the road between Da’el city and Abtaa town in the countryside of Daraa.

On 18 November, an opposition fighter was shot dead by a Syrian army sniper on the western Aleppo countryside frontline, following several instances of bombardments on both sides along the Idlib frontline. On the same day, two Syrian soldiers were killed after forces of Al-Fatah al-Mubin destroyed a Syrian army observation post in the village of Urum al-Kubra, on the Aleppo frontline.

On 19 November, three civilians were killed in a rocket attack on the city of Afrin. On the same day, a man working with Syrian military security and a civilian were shot dead by unknown gunmen in 2 separate attacks in the eastern countryside of Daraa.

On 20 November, a Syrian soldier was killed by a Al-Fatah al-Mubin sniper in the village of Milaja in Idlib province. Another Syrian soldier was also killed on the Miznaz frontline in the western countryside of Aleppo.

On 21 November, an SDF fighter was shot dead by ISIS militants after they opened fire on an SDF military post in the centre of Suwaidan village. The militants then fled into the desert on a motorcycle.

On 22 November, Russian airstrikes killed 2 civilians and injured 7 more whilst targeting militant positions in the village of Taltita, northwest of Idlib. On the same day, Russian warplanes also launched over 40 airstrikes on ISIS positions in the al-Rassafa and Ithiria deserts.

On 23 November, a Syrian soldier was killed and another was wounded after an IED exploded, targeting his car in al-Sakhr village in the countryside near the city of Quneitra.

On 24 November, Israeli warplanes launched airstrikes near the city of Homs resulting in the deaths of 2 Syrian civilians and the injury of 7 other people. On the same day, four reconciled rebels were killed during a clash with government forces as they were besieged in their farm houses near the town of Nahta Sharqiya for not complying with the government-rebel agreements in Daraa. Two 'Turkistan' people were also killed by Syrian army bombardment on the village of Ain Laroze near Jabal Zawiya, in the Idlib countryside.

On 25 November, SOHR reported that a civilian was killed and three fighters were wounded after Russian airstrikes targeted Turkish and Turkish-backed forces' positions in Shan village near Jabal Zawiya.

On 26 November, SOHR reported that at least eight Islamic State fighters were killed and another 15 were injured by Russian airstrikes on desert areas between Deir ez zor and Raqqa city. On the same day it was reported that a Turkish soldier was killed by an unknown gunman in a shooting attack on the Syrian-Turkish border north of Aleppo city.

On 27 November, after mediation with several tribal elders, SDF forces announced that they are going to release 850 detainees that were arrested on charges of 'belonging to ISIS', most of the from Deir Ezzor and al-Hasakah. On the same day, 2 civilians were killed and 5 others were injured after a car bomb exploded in the city of Manbij.

On 28 November, a commander of the Syrian National Army was shot dead by a member of the Al-Hamza Division in the village of al-Mukhtalah in the countryside of Ras Al-Ain after an internal dispute between to the two individuals. On the same day, a civilian was killed and another was injured after Syrian army rockets struck the village of Kafrtaal in the western countryside of Aleppo. Another civilian was also beaten to death by Turkish gendarmerie forces after he was caught trying to enter Turkey illegally near al-Arada village, in al-Hasakah province.

On 29 November, three military intelligence members were blown up and killed by an IED blast that targeted their vehicle on the road between Nawa and Al-Shaykh Saad in the western countryside of Daraa. Two civilians were also killed by Syrian army mortar fire on Nawa, shortly after the attack.

On 30 November, 4 Syrian soldiers, including a lieutenant, were killed in a landmine explosion near the town of Tell Abyad. On the same day, a commander of the rebel Sultan Murad Division was killed by unknown gunmen in al-Raie, north of Aleppo.

Furthermore, clashes between Syrian and opposition forces in the Al-Ghab Plain left 3 militants of Ansar al-Turkistan and 2 Syrian soldiers dead.

== December ==
On 2 December, 10 oil workers were blown up and killed by an ISIS IED blast that targeted their bus at the Al-Kharata oil field, in the Deir ez-Zor Governorate. On the same day, ISIS militants also launched a large scale attack on Syiran army positions near Al-Masrab, killing 2 NDF militiamen. In response to these attacks, the Syrian army launched a combing campaign in the western Deir ez-Zor desert to destroy remaining IS cells.

On 3 December, the United States launched a drone attack targeting and killing a former jihadist of the Hurras al-Din faction in Al-Mastumah, Idlib. On the same day, 2 militiamen of Harakat Hezbollah al-Nujaba were killed in an ISIS ambush near Qabajeb village on the road between Palmyra and Deir Ezzor.

On 4 December, 3 militiamen of Harakat Hezbollah al-Nujaba were killed in different areas of the Deir Ezzor desert, following several clashes with ISIS cells during combing operations.

On 6 December, 21 Iranian-backed militias operating in the Deir Ez-Zour desert joined the Syrian NDF in order to prevent being attacked by Coalition forces, following repeated drone and missile attacks on such militias in recent years. On the same day, a Syrian soldier was shot dead by unknown gunmen in the centre of Nawa city.

On 7 December, Israeli warplanes launched an airstrike attack on the port of Latakia, damaging the port's facilities and setting several containers on fire. Later that day, a senior member of Syrian Military Intelligence, who was in charge of the 'studies department' was shot dead by unknown gunmen on the Sahm – Nafaah road, in the western countryside of Daraa. On the same day, a civilian was also shot dead by Turkish Border Guards after he was seen trying to illegally enter Turkey near Kafr Dariyan, northern Idlib.

On 8 December, the SOHR released footage showing the deportation of at least 490 presumed Iraqi ex-ISIS members to Iraq from the Al-Hawl detention camp in northern Syria. On the same day, a soldier of the Syrian 4th Division was shot dead by unknown gunmen in the town of Tafas, in the western countryside of Daraa.

On 9 December, during a series of shootings in the Daraa Governorate, the Mayor of Inkhil was shot dead by unknown gunmen, whilst a member Daraa Central Committee was also shot dead by gunmen in the village of Tell Shihab. A soldier of the Syrian Army's 5th Corps was also shot dead near Maaraba. On the same day, a Turkish soldier died from wounds he sustained in an attack on Turkish forces by the 'Abu Bakr al-Siddiq battalion' on 15 October near Maarrat Misrin, Idlib.

On 10 December, two SDF fighters were killed near Tell Tamer after Turkish forces targeted their checkpoint with artillery shells.

On 11 December, ISIS militants attacked a joint force of the Syrian Army's 17th Division and the Pro-Assad Liwa al-Quds militia in the Al-Massrab desert, western Deir Ezzor, killing 7 fighters of the combined force. On the same day, 3 civilians were killed and several others were injured after a Russian airstrike targeted rebel positions in Yakubiyah, Idlib.

On 12 December, a civilian was killed in a rocket attack on the town of Atarib in the western Aleppo countryside.

On 14 December, 5 fighters of Hay'at Tahrir al-Sham were killed after the Syrian forces targeted their positions in Ma’rblet in the Idlib countryside with a laser guided missile.

On 16 December, an RAF Typhoon fighter jet shot down a suspected ISIS drone above the U.S. occupied Al-Tanf zone in the Syria desert.

On 18 December, 2 Syrian soldiers were killed and 3 others were wounded after ISIS operatives ambushed a Syrian military vehicle that was travelling on the road between Maskanah and Dibsi Aafnan, southwest of Al-Raqqa. On the same day, 3 SDF fighters were shot dead by ISIS gunmen on the road to Al-Omar oil field in Deir Ezzor countryside.

On 20 December, a Syrian soldier was killed and another was injured after mortars were fired at a police station in the city of As-Suwayda, Daraa.

On 21 December, 4 civilians were killed and 3 Syrian soldiers were injured after Turkish forces bombarded SDF positions near the town of Tell Tamer. SDF forces also returned fire and began bombarding positions of Turkish-backed militants, killing 3 fighters of the Syrian National Army. A man was also shot dead by Turkish border guards after trying to illegally enter Turkey in the northern countryside of Al-Hasakah, near the Syria-Turkey border.

On 23 December, the Mayor of Al-Naimah village, Daraa Governorate, was blown up and killed by a car bomb explosion in the city of Daraa. On the same day, a civilian was killed after Opposition forces launched a ground attack on al-Mafareed farm, north-west of the city of Manbij.

On 24 December, two Syrian soldiers were killed by Opposition forces whilst attempting to plant mines on the Idlib/Aleppo frontlines near the settlements of Bala and Meznaz, western Aleppo.

On 25 December, 6 members, including 2 commanders, of 'Al-Shabibah Al-Thawriyah' (an armed group affiliated with the Kurdish PYD party) were killed after a Turkish drone bombed a house in the town of Kobanî, northern Syria.

On 26 December, an officer of the Syrian Military Security was shot dead by unknown gunmen in the city of Al-Sanamayn, Daraa.

On 27 December, an IED blast in the village of Muzayrib killed a member of the Daraa central committee. On the same day, an SDF commander was shot dead by suspected ISIS operatives in the town of Zeban, western Deir Ez Zour.

On December 28, Israeli forces launched several Precision missiles at the port of Latakia. The attack killed 2 Pro-Assad militiamen and destroyed several containers, setting the port on fire for several hours.

On December 29, a commander of the Al-Hamza Division was killed and 8 others were injured during an internal conflict in the village of Tafrea, near al-Bab. On the same day, 2 civilians were killed after Turkish forces shelled a farm near the town of Al-Farat, near Manbij.

On December 31, 2 civilians were killed after Russian warplanes targeted a farm on the outskirts of the town of Kfardaryan, near the Syrian-Turkish border, north of Idlib.

During the month of December, 21 ISIS militants were killed by the Syrian army and the Russian airforce during combing operations in the Syrian desert.

== See also ==
- List of ongoing armed conflicts
