= Kafr Halab =

Kafr Halab كفر حلب
- Village
- Location of Kafr Halab in Syria
- Coordinates: 36°03′52″N 36°52′15″E
- Country: Syria
- Governorate: Aleppo
- District: Atarib
- Subdistrict: Urum al-Kubrah

Population (2004)
  - Total: 4,136
- Time zone: UTC+3 (AST)

Kafr Halab (Arabic: كفر حلب, also spelled Kafar Halab) or Kafr Aleppo is a town in northern Syria, administratively part of the Atarib District of the Aleppo Governorate, located southwest of Aleppo. Nearby localities include Zardana to the west, Kafr Nuran, al-Jinah and Ibbin Samaan to the northwest, Urum al-Sughra to the north, al-Bawabiya to the south and Maarrat al-Ikhwan and Taftanaz to the southwest. According to the Syria Central Bureau of Statistics (CBS), Kafr Halab had a population of 4,136 in the 2004 census.

Kafr Halab was visited by Syrian geographer Yaqut al-Hamawi in the early 13th century during Ayyubid rule. He described it as "a village belonging to Aleppo [Halab]."

On 28 November 2024, the settlement was captured by HTS affiliated rebels during their offensive against the Syrian Army.
