= Siege of Base 46 =

Siege of the Syrian Army base

Siege of Base 46 حصار الفوج 46
- Part of the Syrian civil war
Date	22 September – 19 November 2012 (1 month and 4 weeks)
Location	Urum al-Sughra, Syria 36°07′33″N 36°53′17″E
Result	Rebel victory: FSA capture Base 46 in mid-November 2012 following a two-month siege

Belligerents
Free Syrian Army; Mujahideen: Dawn of Islam Battalions	(Syria) Syrian Arab Republic: Syrian Arab Armed Forces

Commanders and leaders
Brig. Gen. Ahmad al-Fajj (Mutasim Billah Brigades commander) Col. Abdul Jabbar al-Oqaidi (Aleppo Military Council commander)	Unknown

Units involved
Mutasim Billah Brigades: Ansar Brigade	46th Army Regiment: 812th Battalion; 625th Battalion; 53rd Battalion; 325th Armoured Battalion; 613th Artillery Battalion

Strength
1,500 fighters	350 soldiers (in base); 6 tanks captured

Casualties and losses
Unknown	Rebel/SOHR claim: 150–300 killed 60 captured

The siege of Base 46 (Arabic: حصار الفوج 46) was a siege of the Syrian Arab Army base at Urum al-Sughra by opposition forces waged from late September 2012 until 19 November 2012 as part of the Syrian Civil War. It ended on 19 November 2012 after opposition forces stormed and captured Base 46, in what is considered a key strategic victory for Free Syrian Army (FSA) forces operating in northern Syria.

== Background ==
Located southeast of rebel-held Atarib near the crossroads village of Urum al-Sughra on the main highway between Turkey and Aleppo, Base 46 covers an area of 12 square kilometres (4.6 mi^{2}) on a hilltop. A major supply and command centre for government forces operating in northwest Syria, it is considered possibly the largest base of its kind in northern Syria. The base takes its name from the resident 46th Regiment of the 15th Special Forces Division, one of the main government units fighting in the Battle of Aleppo.

Base 46 has been described as "a strategic prize in the battle for Aleppo", as it occupies a chokepoint on the main army supply route from Idlib to Aleppo. It has been used to shell towns and villages throughout Idlib and Aleppo provinces.

== Siege ==
The siege began in late September as a force of 1,500 fighters, mainly from Aleppo and Idlib provinces, was assembled under the command of Brigadier General Ahmad al-Fajj to capture the base. Al-Fajj, a defector from the Syrian Armed Forces, notably banned politicians, including Islamists, from joining his force. On 22 September, rebels seized the adjacent village of Urum al-Kubrah from "pro-government militias", opening the way to lay siege to the base. Rebels originally thought that Base 46 would fall quickly, but government forces put up a stiff resistance.

By 9 October, the rebel offensive against the base had bogged down. Government troops and snipers had occupied a former school building in the adjacent village of Kafr Ama, halting any attempted rebel advance through a nearly 2 kilometres (1.2 mi) no man's land, while the rebels were battered by government airstrikes and plagued by ammunition shortages and command disputes. Nevertheless, the rebels had succeeded in cutting the base off from land resupply; only helicopters were able to airlift supplies to the besieged troops within the base. General al-Fajj stated that 20 soldiers had defected from the base, who reported that low morale and hunger were causing problems amongst the units trapped in the base.

On 14 October 2012, the base's garrison of several hundred soldiers was reported to have been surrounded by rebel forces. Rebels claimed to have shot down a fighter jet nearby on the previous day as they halted a column of government armoured vehicles heading from Aleppo city to relieve the base, one of two failed attempts by the army to relieve the siege in such a manner.

On 18 November, rebel forces stormed and entered Base 46, clearing all resistance by the following day. Though banned from serving in General al-Fajj's FSA units, Islamist fighters from the Fajr al-Islam group were one of several rebel groups that participated in the final assault. The base soon came under government air assault after opposition forces forced the government troops out, but rebels managed to hold their gains. Foreign journalists soon were able to visit the base following the end of the battle, confirming the rebel victory.

== Aftermath ==
The base's facilities sustained heavy damage during the siege. All of its buildings were gutted and scarred from small-arms fire and shelling, and at least one major building was destroyed in the final assault. Rebel fighters looted the base of weapons and defaced portraits of President Bashar al-Assad found in the buildings. Those government soldiers who did not escape were reportedly taken prisoner, though an unknown number were apparently released after agreeing to defect. According to General al-Fajj, "nearly 300" government soldiers were killed during the siege, while around 60 more were taken prisoner. Government dead were buried in mass graves on the base, while al-Fajj stated that the prisoners would be tried for war crimes. Large quantities of materiel from the base fell into rebel hands. Around 15 tanks and armoured vehicles as well as numerous artillery pieces and rocket launchers were taken by rebels from Base 46 to more secure locations closer to the Turkish border. The equipment haul included a number of DShK heavy machine guns and around 18 complete Strela 2 MANPADs, both highly useful in anti-aircraft capacities.

The capture of Base 46 has been characterised as a significant strategic victory for opposition forces in northern Syria, showing a higher level of strategic planning and organisation taking form within the FSA. In addition to partially encircling government forces fighting in Aleppo, the base's capture eliminates another potential supply route for them, while further opening up rebel supply routes coming from Turkey. The fall of Base 46 additionally has been characterised as important for rebel forces seeking to gain more ground in the ongoing battle for Idlib Province. Soon after the capture, an army attack helicopter and a MiG fighter jet were shot down by rebels in Aleppo Province using domestically captured weapons, possibly from Base 46.

On 21 November, the Syrian Observatory for Human Rights reported that rebels had on the previous day stormed the besieged base of the 111th Regiment at Sheikh Suleiman, located north of Base 46. The success of the assault on Base 46 was not repeated, and opposition fighters were repelled from the area by an army counterattack, in which 25 rebels were killed. However, other opposition activists reported that the rebels managed to temporarily capture half of the base in the attack, allegedly taking a handful of artillery pieces and significant stores of ammunition in the process and declaring the base as functionally "neutralised". Fighting was still ongoing. On 27 November, rebels allegedly used surface-to-air missiles seized from Base 46 to shoot down a government helicopter returning to Aleppo from a resupply mission to Sheikh Suleiman. Sheikh Suleiman finally fell to rebels led by the jihadist group Jabhat al-Nusra on 10 December.

Base 46 was recaptured by the Syrian Arab Army on 13 February 2020, as part of a larger offensive conducted by government forces in the region.
