= June 2021 United States airstrike in Syria =

Bombing by the United States against militia groups in Syria

- Part of the aftermath of the 2019–2021 Persian Gulf crisis and American-led intervention in the Syrian civil war
- Location of Deir ez-Zor Governorate in Syria
- Type: Air interdiction
- Location: Imam Ali military base, Abu Kamal border crossing, Abu Kamal, Deir ez-Zor Governorate, Syria
- Planned by: United States
- Commanded by: Joe Biden
- Target: Kata'ib Hezbollah; Kata'ib Sayyid al-Shuhada
- Date: 28 June 2021 (local time, UTC+3)
- Executed by: United States Air Force
- Casualties: 4–9 militiamen killed

The airstrikes on Al Hury, Syria, 27 June 2021

On 28 June 2021, President Biden directed airstrikes against Iran-backed militia groups close to the Syria-Iraq border. F-15E and F-16 aircraft were used to launch the attack in what the U.S. described as a retaliatory attack against U.S. facilities and personnel in Iraq by militia groups. Two operational and weapons storage facilities were targeted in Syria, the U.S. military revealed in a statement. Despite the U.S. not disclosing the information regarding the casualties in the attack, the SOHR stated that at least nine Iran-backed Iraqi militia fighters died, leaving many others injured. Iraqi militia groups aligned with Iran in a statement named four members of the Kataib Sayyed al-Shuhada faction they said were killed in the attack on the Syria-Iraq border.

== Reaction ==
Iraqi Prime Minister Mustafa Al-Kadhimi condemned the air attack as a "blatant and unacceptable violation of Iraqi sovereignty and Iraqi national security". Meanwhile, Syrian state media (SANA) reported that an air missile attack after midnight on residential houses in the countryside of Abu Kamal, presumably by American warplanes, killed a child and injured three civilians.

== Aftermath ==
Hours later, U.S. forces in Syria came under fire, following the U.S. strikes on the Syria-Iraqi border. Pro-Iranian militias fired rockets at the American base at Al-Omar Oilfield in Syria in response to U.S. airstrikes. The U.S. coalition responded by firing heavy artillery on Iranian-backed militias' positions around Al-Mayadin. There were no injuries sustained during the attack, according to a spokesman for Operation Inherent Resolve, Col. Wayne Marotto.

== See also ==
- List of United States attacks on Syria during the Syrian civil war
- February 2021 United States airstrike in Syria
