= Imam Ali military base =

Iranian military base

Imam Ali Military Base
- Near Abu Kamal, Deir ez-Zor Governorate in Syria

Site information
- Type: Armed Forces of the Islamic Republic of Iran base
- Owner: Ba'athist Syria
- Controlled by: Islamic Republic of Iran Armed Forces
- Condition: Inoperative

Location
- Location in Syria
- Coordinates: 34°27′13″N 40°56′12″E

Site history
- Built: 2019
- In use: 2019–2024

The Imam Ali military base was an Iranian military base located near the eastern Syrian town of Abu Kamal, near the border with Iraq.

== History ==
The base has reportedly been under construction since early 2018. Fox News reported on 4 September 2019 that a "classified Iranian project", the Imam Ali military base, was being constructed near Abu Kamal, which was confirmed by satellite images. The project was approved by the top leadership in Tehran and is being completed by the Iranian Quds Force.

On 9 September 2019, reports emerged that "Iranian" or "Iranian-backed militias" had been targeted in airstrikes, which appeared to be similar to a June 2018 airstrike that targeted a Kata'ib Hezbollah base at a similar location. Satellite imagery taken by ImageSat International in late 2019 suggests a tunnel system is being built, which Western intelligence sources believe will hold missiles.

The site has been struck multiple times by the Israeli Air Force after which the construction of tunnels was noticed to have accelerated, and would soon be operational, as of November 2019.

The site was struck again on 25 February 2021 by the United States military in retaliation for multiple rocket attacks against U.S. forces in Iraq ten days earlier, and became the first known offensive military operation carried out under U.S. president Joe Biden. On 28 June 2021, another airstrike targeted the base, which left at least nine Iran-backed Iraqi militia fighters dead and many others injured, according to SOHR.

All Iranian military bases in Syria have been abandoned as IRGC withdrew its fighters from Syria in December 2024 amid the fall of the Assad regime.

== See also ==
- Iranian involvement in the Syrian civil war
