= Atarib Subdistrict =

Atarib Subdistrict ناحية تل رفعت
- Subdistrict
- Location of Atarib Subdistrict within Aleppo Governorate

- Location in Syria
- Coordinates (Atarib): 36°07′10″N 36°51′41″E
- Country: Syria
- Governorate: Aleppo
- District: Atarib District
- Seat: Atarib

Population (2004)
  - Total: 32,186
- Geocode: SY021000

Atarib Subdistrict (Arabic: ناحية تل رفعت, romanized: Nāḥiyah Atarib) is a subdistrict of Atarib District in western Aleppo Governorate, northwestern Syria. Administrative centre is the town of Atarib.

The administrative center of Atarib Subdistrict and Atarib District is the city of Atarib.

At the 2004 census, the villages forming this subdistrict had a total population of 32,186.

== Cities, towns and villages ==
Cities, towns and villages of Atarib Subdistrict
PCode	Name	Population
C1022	Atarib	10,657
C1038	Maarat Atarib	5,796
C1030	al-Abzamo	4,545
C1035	Kafr Karmin	3,769
C1023	al-Sahharah	2,636
C1020	Tuwama	1,829
C1033	Kafr Amma	1,781
C1028	Taydil	1,173
