= Urum al-Kubrah Subdistrict =

Urum al-Kubrah Subdistrict ناحية أورم الكبرى
- Subdistrict
- Country: Syria
- Governorate: Aleppo
- District: Atarib District
- Seat: Urum al-Kubra

Population (2004)
  - Total: 22,851
- Geocode: SY021002

Urum al-Kubrah Subdistrict (Arabic: ناحية أورم الكبرى, romanized: Nāḥiyah Urum al-Kubrah) is a subdistrict of Atarib District in western Aleppo Governorate, northwestern Syria. Administrative centre is the town of Urum al-Kubrah.

The administrative center of Urum al-Kubrah Subdistrict in Atarib District is the city of Urum al-Kubrah.

At the 2004 census, the villages forming this subdistrict had a total population of 22,851.

== Cities, towns and villages ==
Cities, towns and villages of Urum al-Kubrah Subdistrict
PCode	Name	Population
C1029	Urum al-Kubra	5,391
C1039	Kafr Halab	4,136
C1034	Kafr Naha	3,438
C1031	al-Shaykh Ali	3,139
C1024	Awayjil	2,407
C1037	Kafr Taal	1,880
C1019	Qanater	1,045
C1040	Kafr Jum al-Gharbiyah	778
C1027	Urum al-Sughra	637
