= Ibbin Samaan Subdistrict =

Ibbin Samaan Subdistrict ناحية أبين سمعان
- Subdistrict
- Country: Syria
- Governorate: Aleppo
- District: Atarib District
- Seat: Ibbin Samaan

Population (2004)
  - Total: 21,925
- Geocode: SY021001

Ibbin Samaan Subdistrict (Arabic: ناحية أبين سمعان, romanized: Nāḥiyah Ibbin Samaan) is a subdistrict of Atarib District in western Aleppo Governorate, northwestern Syria. Administrative centre is the town of Ibbin Samaan.

At the 2004 census, the villages forming this subdistrict had a total population of 21,925.

== Cities, towns and villages ==
Cities, towns and villages of Ibbin Samaan Subdistrict
| PCode | Name | Population |
|---|---|---|
| C1026 | Ibbin Samaan | 6,220 |
| C1032 | Jeineh | 4,188 |
| C1025 | Batibo | 3,943 |
| C1041 | Kafr Thoran | 3,729 |
| C1036 | Kafr Nasih al-Atarib | 2,509 |
| C1021 | Babka | 1,336 |
