= Urum al-Kubra =

Orem al-Kubrah أورم الكبرى
- Town
- Location of Orem al-Kubrah in Syria
- Coordinates: 36°08′55″N 36°57′00″E
- Country: Syria
- Governorate: Aleppo
- District: Atarib
- Subdistrict: Urum al-Kubrah

Population (2004)
  - Total: 5,391
- Time zone: UTC+3 (AST)

Urum al-Kubrah (Arabic: أورم الكبرى, also spelled Urem al-Kubra) is a town in western Aleppo Governorate, northwestern Syria. With a population of 5,391 as per the 2004 census, it is the administrative center of Nahiya Urum al-Kubrah in Atarib District. Located southwest of Aleppo, nearby localities include Atarib to the west, Awayjil to the north, Kafr Naha to the east, al-Radwan to the south and Urum al-Sughra to the southwest.

Urum al-Kubra is the administrative center of Nahiya Urum al-Kubra in Atarib District.

== Syrian civil war ==
As of 2020, the town formed part of the frontline between forces of the Syrian Arab Army and the militant group Hayat Tahrir al-Sham (HTS).

On 18 January 2023, as part of increasing attacks on the frontline, HTS militants attacked Syrian Army positions near the town, resulting in violent clashes. At least 5 Syrian soldiers and 3 HTS militants were killed in the clashes.

On 27 November 2024, as part of the 2024 Syrian opposition offensives, Syrian opposition militants recaptured Urum al-Kubra.
