= Ibbin Samaan =

Ibbin Samaan أبين سمعان
- Town
- Location of Ibbin Samaan in Syria
- Coordinates: 36°05′18″N 36°45′36″E
- Country: Syria
- Governorate: Aleppo
- District: Atarib
- Subdistrict: Ibbin Samaan

Population (2004)
  - Total: 5,393
- Time zone: UTC+3 (AST)
- Geocode: C1026

Ibbin Samaan (Arabic: أبين سمعان) is a small town in western Aleppo Governorate, northwestern Syria. With a population of 6,220 as per the 2004 census, the town is the administrative center of Nahiya Ibbin Samaan.

Ibbin Samaan is the administrative center of Nahiya Ibbin Samaan in Atarib District.
