= Urum al-Sughra =

Urum al-Sughra أورم الصغرى
- Village
- Location of Urum al-Sughra in Syria
- Coordinates: 36°03′52″N 36°52′15″E
- Country: (Syrian opposition) Syria
- Governorate: Aleppo
- District: Atarib
- Subdistrict: Urum al-Kubrah

Population (2004)
  - Total: 637
- Time zone: UTC+3 (AST)

Urum al-Sughra (Arabic: أورم الصغرى) is a village in western Aleppo Governorate, northwestern Syria. With a population of 637 as per the 2004 census, the village administratively belongs to Nahiya Urum al-Kubrah in Atarib District.

Siege of Base 46 took place here in 2012.

== Notable people ==
- Khaled Khalifa, novelist, screenwriter, and poet (1964-2023)
