= February 2021 United States airstrike in Syria =

Bombing by the United States against militia groups in Syria

- Part of the aftermath of the 2019–2021 Persian Gulf crisis and the American-led intervention in the Syrian civil war
- Location of Deir ez-Zor Governorate in Syria
- Type: Air Interdiction
- Location: Imam Ali military base, Abu Kamal, Deir ez-Zor Governorate, Syria; 34.454°N 40.936°E
- Planned by: United States
- Commanded by: Joe Biden
- Target: Kata'ib Hezbollah; Kata'ib Sayyid ul-Shuhada
- Date: 25 February 2021 (local time, UTC+3)
- Executed by: United States Air Force
- Casualties: 1–22 militiamen killed (Note: Kata'ib Hezbollah claimed that only one of their militiamen were killed. Reuters, citing a "medical source at a hospital in the area and several local sources", reported that 17 people had been killed, while Syrian Observatory for Human Rights reported that 22 militiamen killed in the airstrike.); Several wounded

On February 25, 2021, the United States military carried out an airstrike on a site which it believed to have been occupied by Iranian-backed Iraqi militias operating from across the border in eastern Syria. The unilateral operation was in retaliation for multiple rocket attacks against U.S. forces in Iraq ten days prior and was the first known offensive military operation carried out under U.S. president Joe Biden.

== Background ==
The United States intervened in Iraq in 2014 as part of Operation Inherent Resolve, a U.S.-led coalition tasked with combating the Islamic State of Iraq and the Levant. Iran intervened in the country as well, supporting Shia militias, several of which are hostile to the U.S.-led coalition. Rocket attacks against U.S. forces in the country increased during the 2019–2021 Persian Gulf crisis. Iran has been involved in Syria's civil war since the onset of the conflict in 2011, initially advising pro-government elements there, while the U.S. has played an active role in the conflict reportedly since 2012 but only formally intervening as part of Inherent Resolve in 2014.

On February 15, 2021, ten days before the airstrike, a rocket attack in the Iraqi city of Erbil killed an Operation Inherent Resolve coalition civilian contractor from the Philippines and injured six others, including one U.S. soldier.

On February 20, 2021, another rocket attack targeted Balad Air Base in Iraq's Saladin Governorate, wounding one South African civilian contractor working for the U.S.-led coalition.

== Airstrike ==
The airstrike targeted a small cluster of buildings in al-Hurri village near Abu Kamal, believed by the United States Department of Defense to be occupied by members of the Iraqi Kata'ib Hezbollah and Kata'ib Sayyid ul-Shuhada militias. Seven 500 lb (230 kg) bombs equipped with JDAM guidance kits were dropped from two U.S. F-15E fighter jets, destroying nine facilities and rendering two others uninhabitable. U.S. defense and Biden administration officials publicly emphasized the "limited" nature of the operation, saying the strike was aimed at impeding the militias' abilities to conduct future attacks. The Wall Street Journal later reported that a second strike was called off by Biden after "a woman and a couple of children" were spotted in the area.

The death toll of the strike is unclear due to inconsistent reports from different sources. Reuters cited local reports that at least 17 had been killed, while the Syrian Observatory for Human Rights reported 22 deaths. Kata'ib Hezbollah claimed that just one person was killed and four others were injured.

It was the first publicly acknowledged offensive military operation carried out by the Biden administration.

== Aftermath ==
Following the strikes, U.S. president Joe Biden warned Iran, saying, "You can't act with impunity, be careful." Pentagon spokesman John Kirby called the airstrikes a "proportionate military response" to the prior rocket attacks. At the same time, Secretary of Defense Lloyd Austin said he recommended the operation to Biden. Iran condemned the strike as "a violation of Syria's sovereignty" and denied responsibility for rocket attacks on U.S. forces in Iraq.

U.S. Representative Michael McCaul regarded the airstrike as a "necessary deterrent" and said that attacks on U.S. interests "will not be tolerated." However, the operation was criticized by some in the U.S. Congress for potential unconstitutionality. Senators Tim Kaine and Chris Murphy called for a congressional briefing on the legality of the strikes and Representative Ro Khanna argued there was "no justification for a president to authorize a military strike that is not in self-defense against an imminent threat without congressional authorization," adding that the airstrike made Biden "the seventh consecutive US president to order strikes in the Middle East". The National Security Council said it notified Congress beforehand and Biden defended the operation in a letter to Congress on February 27, arguing for its constitutionality, citing Article 51 of the United Nations Charter, and saying he ordered the airstrikes "to protect and defend our personnel and our partners" against future rocket attacks.

Former U.S. Deputy Assistant Secretary of Defense for the Middle East, "Mick" Mulroy, commented that the strikes were likely conducted in Syria rather than Iraq in order to avoid issues for the Iraqi government.

== See also ==
- Eastern Syria insurgency
- Timeline of United States military operations
- December 2019 United States airstrikes in Iraq and Syria
- List of United States attacks on Syria during the Syrian civil war
