= Time in Syria =

Time in the Middle East: Offset / Zone(s); UTC+2 / Eastern European Time; Israel Standard Time; Palestine Standard Time; UTC+3 / Eastern European Summer Time; Israel Summer Time; Palestine Summer Time; UTC+3 / Arabia Standard Time; Turkey Time; UTC+3:30 / Iran Standard Time; UTC+4 / Gulf Standard Time; Standard time observed all year Daylight saving time observed

Time in Syria is given by Arabia Standard Time (AST) (UTC+03:00).

On 4 October 2022, Syria abolished daylight saving time (DST). Prior to that date, Syria used EET (UTC+02:00) and observed DST, as EEST (UTC+03:00). Transition dates had in general been last Friday of March (sometimes first Friday of April) to last Friday of October, or before 2006 1 April to 1 October with variations. This was similar, but not same as the European Union, where transition dates are on Sundays.

== IANA time zone database ==
The IANA time zone database contains one zone for Syria in the file zone.tab, named Asia/Damascus.
