= Atarib District =

Atarib District منطقة الأتارب
- District
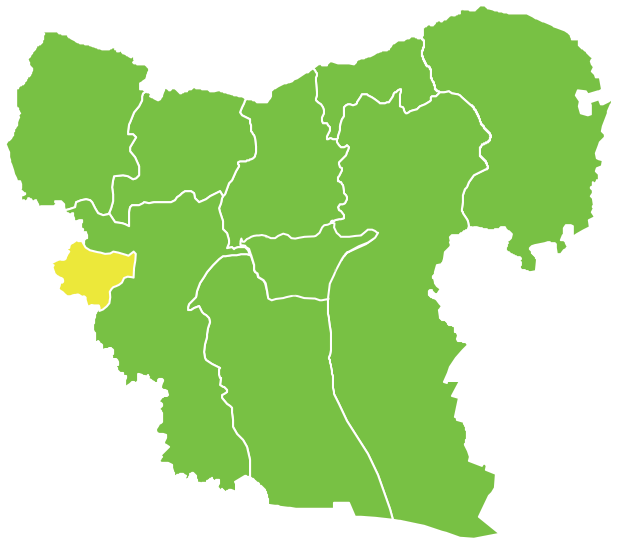
- Location of Atarib District within Aleppo Governorate

- Location in Syria
- Coordinates (Atarib): 36.13°N 36.82°E
- Country: Syria
- Governorate: Aleppo
- Seat: Atarib
- Subdistricts: 3 nawāḥī

Area
  - Total: 308.22 km^{2} (119.00 sq mi)

Population (2004)
  - Total: 76,873
  - Density: 249.41/km^{2} (645.97/sq mi)
- Geocode: SY0210

Atarib District (Arabic: منطقة الأتارب, romanized: manṭiqat al-Atārib) is a district of Aleppo Governorate in northern Syria. Administrative centre is the city of Atarib.

The district is located in the central western region of the Aleppo Governorate, sharing its west border with the Idlib Governorate. Until December 2008, it was a subdistrict of the neighboring Mount Simeon District. At the 2004 census, the subdistrict had a population of 76,873.

== Subdistricts ==
The district of Atarib is divided into three subdistricts or nawāḥī:

Subdistricts of Atarib District
Code	Name	Area	Population	Seat
SY021000	Atarib Subdistrict	km^{2}	32,186	Atarib
SY021001	Ibbin Samaan Subdistrict	km^{2}	21,925	Ibbin Samaan
SY021002	Urum al-Kubrah Subdistrict	km^{2}	22,851	Urum al-Kubrah
