= Atarib =

Town in Syria

Atarib أتارب
- Town
- Location of Atarib in Syria
- Coordinates: 36°08′20″N 36°49′48″E
- Country: Syria
- Governorate: Aleppo
- District: Atarib
- Subdistrict: Atarib
- Elevation: 310 m (1,020 ft)

Population (2004)
  - Total: 10,657
- Time zone: UTC+3 (AST)
- Geocode: C1022

Atarib (Arabic: أتارب, romanized: ʾAtārib), also known as Atharib or Athareb, is a town in western Aleppo countryside, Aleppo Governorate, Syria. Located 25 kilometres (16 miles) west of the city of Aleppo and 25 km (16 mi) southeast of Reyhanlı in Turkish-administered Hatay Province, it is the regional center of Atarib District. In the 2004 census, the town of Atarib had a population of 10,657.

== History ==
=== Crusader era ===
In December 1110, Tancred, Prince of Galilee pounded the walls of Atarib, which forced Seljuq ruler of Aleppo, Fakhr al-Mulk Radwan, to purchase peace by handing Atarib and Zardana to Tancred, in addition to twenty thousand dinars and ten of best Arab horses.

In August 1119, Ilghazi, joined by Toghtekin and two other Muslim chieftains, captured Atarib following the Battle of Ager Sanguinis. However, Atarib was ceded back to the Crusaders a year later during an internal conflict between Ilghazi and his son Suleiman. Later on, the Zengid leader Imad ad-Din Zengi conquered Kafartab and other fortress cities along the eastern frontier of the Principality of Antioch's territories, such as Atarib, Maarrat al-Numan and Zardana in the spring of 1135. Afterwards, Atarib was briefly captured by Byzantine Emperor John II Komnenos during his campaigns in Syria in 1138.

The city was later devastated by the 1138 Aleppo earthquake, then occupied by Muslims.

=== Modern era ===
During the Syrian Revolution, Atarib has been a rebel-held town. Anti-Assad regime demonstrations took place in Atarib early in the Syrian revolution, in April 2011. It became a centre for defected officers from the Syrian Arab Army, who would go on to form the nucleus of the Free Syrian Army and specifically its al-Mutasem Bi’ allah brigade. Government forces were forced out in July 2012. In August 2012, it was reported that every building downtown was damaged, with windows blown out, doors peppered with shrapnel and awnings shredded to ribbons. At the center sat the charred shells of the police station and city hall, which troops occupied in February. For months, local rebels attacked their positions and tried to cut their supply lines. By the time the army left in June, the city was destroyed and deserted. Town leaders have formed military and civil councils and opened a prison that holds some 15 people. The army shelled the town daily, keeping residents away. Only about 4,000 residents remained as of August 2012.

It "is known for its history of civil and armed resistance against both the Syrian government and hard-line Islamist groups" and its residents have driven out both ISIL in 2014 and al-Nusra troops in 2015. By November 2013, the town was controlled by ISIL. By early January 2014, clashes were reported between the Islamic Front and ISIS forces in the town. By April 2014, the town was back under rebel control. By June 2014, clashes were reported between the FSA and al-Nusra; about five days later, most of al-Nusra Front withdrew from the towns of Atarib and Sarmada. Al-Nusra attempted to take control of the city in February 2015. During al-Nusra's campaign to eliminate the FSA-affiliated Hazzm Movement, al-Nusra reportedly threatened to besiege Atarib and demanded the surrender of locals who were members of the Hazzm Movement. However, with support from other rebel groups, Atarib resisted al-Nusra control.

In 2017, it came within one of the "de-escalation zones" brokered between Russia, Iran and Turkey, but has been bombed since by government forces, including strikes on the marketplace in November 2017, described by the U.N. Commission of Inquiry on Syria as a possible war crime, the first time it has explicitly implicated Russia in possible war crimes.

The town was severely damaged by the earthquake of 6 February 2023, with hundreds of residents killed or injured.

On 28 November 2024, during the Northwestern Syria offensive, fifteen civilians were killed in a Russian airstrike in the town.

== Climate ==
Atarib has a hot-summer Mediterranean climate (Köppen climate classification: Csa).

Climate data for Atarib
Month	Jan	Feb	Mar	Apr	May	Jun	Jul	Aug	Sep	Oct	Nov	Dec	Year
Mean daily maximum °C (°F)	10.6 (51.1)	12.9 (55.2)	16.8 (62.2)	22.2 (72.0)	28.1 (82.6)	32.7 (90.9)	35.0 (95.0)	35.3 (95.5)	33.2 (91.8)	27.1 (80.8)	18.6 (65.5)	12.5 (54.5)	23.8 (74.8)
Daily mean °C (°F)	6.6 (43.9)	7.9 (46.2)	11.1 (52.0)	15.7 (60.3)	20.6 (69.1)	25.2 (77.4)	27.8 (82.0)	28.2 (82.8)	25.5 (77.9)	19.8 (67.6)	12.7 (54.9)	8.1 (46.6)	17.4 (63.4)
Mean daily minimum °C (°F)	2.6 (36.7)	2.9 (37.2)	5.4 (41.7)	9.1 (48.4)	13.1 (55.6)	17.7 (63.9)	20.5 (68.9)	21.0 (69.8)	17.7 (63.9)	12.5 (54.5)	6.8 (44.2)	3.7 (38.7)	11.1 (52.0)
Average precipitation mm (inches)	82 (3.2)	71 (2.8)	55 (2.2)	40 (1.6)	18 (0.7)	4 (0.2)	0 (0)	0 (0)	3 (0.1)	26 (1.0)	43 (1.7)	74 (2.9)	416 (16.4)
Source: Climate-Data.org

== Bibliography ==
- Runciman, Steven (1987). A History of the Crusades, Volume 2. Cambridge University Press. ISBN 9780521347716.
- Venning, Timothy (2015). A Chronology of the Crusades. Routledge. ISBN 9781317496434.
